= Worldwide Atrocities Dataset =

The Worldwide Atrocities Dataset is a dataset collected by the Computational Event Data System at Pennsylvania State University and sponsored by the Political Instability Task Force (PITF) that is, in turn, funded by the Central Intelligence Agency in the United States.

== Data ==
Unlike other datasets such as the Global Database of Events, Language, and Tone (GDELT), Integrated Conflict Early Warning System (ICEWS), data for the Worldwide Atrocities Dataset is entered and coded manually. Data is available for download in two files:

- Data from January 1995 to December 2012, covering 7775 events. This is 3.5 MB compressed, and 12 MB uncompressed.
- Data from January 1, 2013 to the present, with a four-month embargo period (so the four most recent months are unavailable). Data is updated monthly.

In addition to the datasets, a coding manual is available for download.

== Reception ==
=== Academic reception ===
The Worldwide Atrocities Dataset has been referenced in academic research on the impact of climate change on violence in Africa. It has also been referenced alongside the ACLED dataset and the Peacekeeping Operations Locations and Event Dataset in a paper on the geography of conflict by Wiedmann and Kuse (2009). A 2011 paper by Gold and Haar used the Worldwide Atrocities Dataset to understand the spatial dimension of refugee flows.

=== Reception in blogs ===
Political scientist and forecasting expert Jay Ulfelder called the Worldwide Atrocities Dataset a "useful data set on political violence that almost no one is using." It was also referenced by Patrick Meier while reviewing a paper that used the dataset.
