= Philip Schrodt =

Philip Andrew "Phil" Schrodt (born July 24, 1951) is a political scientist known for his work in automated data and event coding for political news. On August 1, 2013, he announced that he was leaving his job as professor at Pennsylvania State University to become a full-time consultant. Schrodt is currently a senior research scientist at the statistical consulting firm Parus Analytical Systems.

== Biography ==
Schrodt received an M.A. in mathematics and a Ph.D. in political science from Indiana University in 1976. He worked at Northwestern University for 12 years, then at the University of Kansas for 21 years, and at Pennsylvania State University for 4 years, before leaving academia for a private sector job with Parus Analytical Systems.

== Academic work ==
Schrodt's work has largely been focused on automated coding of event data for political news. In 1994, he created the Kansas Event Data System (KEDS) that won the “Outstanding Computer Software Award” from the American Political Science Association in 1995. In 2000, he created the Textual Analysis by Augmented Replacement Instructions (TABARI) software in 2000 that improved on the KEDS. He developed the Conflict and Mediation Event Observations (CAMEO) data coding framework along with Deborah J. Gerner and others. The TABARI software could automatically code event data according to the CAMEO framework.

A modification of TABARI, called JABARI-NLP, was used for the Integrated Conflict Early Warning System (ICEWS) database by Lockheed Martin Advanced Technology Laboratories. TABARI and CAMEO are also used for event coding for the Global Database of Events, Language, and Tone (GDELT Project), that Schrodt co-created with Kalev Leetaru and others.

Logistic regression models created by Schrodt were also successfully incorporated into the predictive algorithms used by Lockheed Martin for ICEWS.

== Reception ==
Schrodt's academic work as well as his views (including those expressed in his academic work and in his blog posts) are frequently referenced by other blogs about data science and predictive analytics in political science, such as Jay Ulfelder's blog, the Predictive Heuristics blog, and Bad Hessian. He has also been referenced in Foreign Policy articles.
