= Samuel Gbaydee Doe =

Liberian activist

- Born: Samuel Gbaydee Doe; 11 November 1966 (age 59); Sierra Leone
- Education: BSc Economics, University of Liberia; M.A. Conflict Transformation, Eastern Mennonite University, VA, USA; Ph.D. Social and International Affairs, Bradford University, UK
- Occupations: Peacebuilding, conflict analyst
- Known for: West African Network for Peacebuilding
- Awards: 2002 Distinguished Alumni Award, Eastern Mennonite University, Harrisonburg, VA

Samuel Gbaydee Doe (born 11 November 1966) is a conflict, peace, and development professional from Liberia. Doe was a cofounder, with Emmanuel Bombande, of the West Africa Network for Peacebuilding (WANEP), based in Accra, Ghana. This organization focuses on collaborative approaches to conflict prevention and was founded in 1998 in response to the civil wars taking place in West Africa. The organization is known for their work with several regional partners such as the Economic Community of West African States (ECOWAS) and the African Union’s Economic, Social, and Cultural Council (ECOSOCC).

== Early life and education ==
Samuel Gbaydee Doe (no relation to former Liberian President Sam Doe) was born in Sierra Leone in November 1966, and lived there for 6 years prior to moving to Liberia. He attended the University of Liberia in Monrovia intending to pursue a career in banking. While he was pursuing his Bachelor of Science degree in Economics in 1989 the First Liberian Civil War broke out. Following months of starvation and first hand experiences of the horrors of war on children, Doe decided to put his energies toward ending the conflict. In October 1990, in the midst of the Liberian civil war, Doe worked with the Catholic Church to establish the Archdiocesan Counseling Program a psychological trauma counseling program under Archbishop Michael Kpakala Francis to help reintegrate former child soldiers. He also worked with the Christian Health Association of Liberia (CHAL), and Centre for the Study of War Trauma and Children at AME Zion University in Monrovia. He followed that to work with CHAL to establish a peer mediation program known in Liberia as the Student Palava Management Programme. In 1995, Doe was a Caux Scholar at a center run by Initiatives of Change in Caux, Switzerland. He then served as an intern there and was appointed to a faculty position in 1997 until 2006 when he resigned to focus on his work at the United Nations. In May 1996 he traveled to the United States with sponsorship from the Mennonite Board of Missions and entered what was then called the Conflict Transformation Program at Eastern Mennonite University (now the Center for Justice and Peacebuilding) in the fall of the year. Following the completion of his degree in 1998, he returned to West Africa where he cofounded and was the first executive director of the West Africa Network for Peacebuilding (WANEP).

“I dreamed of a regional movement of civil society that would collaborate with regional intergovernmental bodies to restore not just stability in Africa but democratic freedom and prosperity. I dreamed of establishing an early-warning system throughout civil society that would head off violent conflicts before they ravage our societies. Those dreams became reality in just five years. The profound thing was the speed at which ordinary people mobilized for peace through the West Africa Network for Peacebuilding.”

== Work ==
During his time with WANEP, he worked with several regional groups such as ECOWAS, the African Union, Club de Sahel and the United Nations (including ECOSOCC). It was during his time at WANEP that he was introduced to Leymah Gbowee whom he mentored to lead WANEP’s Women in Peacebuilding Network (WIPNET) branch in Liberia. WIPNET was the brainchild of Thelma Ekiyor of Nigeria and it became a special program of WANEP. Through WIPNET Leymah established the Women of Liberia Mass Action for Peace which went on to be a critical voice in the Liberia peace process and led to Leymah co-sharing the Nobel Peace Prize of 2011 with Ellen Johnson Sirleaf (President of Liberia) and Tawakkul Karman (Yemen). He also helped to implement and served as chair of the Forum on Early Warning and Early Response (FEWER), a London-based global network of scholars and practitioners who pioneered the concept of heading off conflict through early warnings collected at the grassroots. He cofounded the International Conflict and Security (INCAS) Consulting in London in 2003 with David Nyheim, Anton Ivanov, and Tom Porteous, where he also served as chair.

Shortly thereafter, Doe began working with the United Nations Development Program as Senior Conflict Prevention and Civil Society Development Expert with the Pacific Regional Center of UNDP in Fiji. From there he was hired as International Consultant for Evaluation and Strategic Coordination with the UN Mission in Liberia.

In 2007, he was named Development and Reconciliation Advisor for the UN in Sri Lanka. From 2007 to 2010, he worked to resolve the conflict in Sri Lanka between Tamil and Sinhalese communities and documented human rights atrocities committed on all sides of the conflict. In 2011, he was reassigned to New York to assist in the preparation of the Secretary-General report on the Sri Lanka conflict as Senior Political Officer. This report detailed atrocities committed by all sides, but was particularly critical of the government’s actions during the conflict. From 2004 until 2010, Samuel Gbaydee Doe was also a Ph.D. student in social and international affairs at the University of Bradford, UK. His dissertation was titled “Indigenising post-war state reconstruction: the case of Liberia and Sierra Leone.”

Doe is currently working as Senior Policy Advisor and Team Leader, Policy and Planning Division, Bureau for Crisis Prevention and Recovery, at the UNDP in New York. He regularly teaches courses on conflict sensitive development and trauma healing at Eastern Mennonite University’s Center for Justice and Peacebuilding, almost always during its Summer Peacebuilding Institute, and at the Caux Center, in Caux Switzerland.

== Publications ==
A list of Sam Gbaydee Doe's publications:

- Hart B, Doe J, Gbaydee Doe S. (1993). Trauma healing and reconciliation training manual: a handbook for trainers and trainees. Liberia: Reconciliation and Healing Program, Christian Health Association of Liberia
- Doe, S. G. (1998). Former child soldiers in Liberia. Relief and Rehabilitation Network, 1-3.
- Doe, S. G. (1998). Call Me By My Real Name: A Cry for Lost Identity. Relief and Rehabilitation Network Newsletter, 12, 1-1.
- Ayindo, B., Doe, S. G., Jenner, J. M., & Abdi, N. A. (2001). When You are the Peacebuilder: Stories and Reflections on Peacebuilding from Africa. Conflict Transformation Program, Eastern Mennonite University.
- Doe, S. G., & Bombande, E. H. (2002). A View from West Africa. Into the Eye of the Storm, 159-172, A Handbook of International Peacebuilding. Lederach, J. P., & Jenner, J. M. (Eds.). Jossey-Bass Incorporated Pub.
- M'boge, F., & Doe, S. G. (2004). African Commitments to Civil Society Engagement: A Review of Eight NEPAD Countries. African Human Security Initiative (AHSI).
- Bugnion, C., Lafrenière, L., Doe, S. G., Tefferi, H., & Garlo, C. (2006). External Mid-Term Evaluation Report of the Disarmament. Demobilisation, Rehabilitation and Reintegration Programme in Liberia: UNDP. Chicago
- Doe, S. G. (2009). Indigenising post-war state reconstruction: the case of Liberia and Sierra Leone (Doctoral dissertation, University of Bradford). Chicago
- Doe, S. G. (2010). Poverty reduction strategy in collapsed states: The case of Sierra Leone. Journal of Peacebuilding & Development, 5(2), 47-61.

== Honors ==
2002 Eastern Mennonite University’s Distinguished Service Award
