= Conflict and Mediation Event Observations =

Conflict and Mediation Event Observations (CAMEO) is a framework for coding event data (typically used for events that merit news coverage, and generally applied to the study of political news and violence). It is a more recent alternative to the WEIS coding system developed by Charles A. McClelland and the Conflict and Peace Data Bank (COPDAB) coding system developed by Edward Azar.

== History ==
Work on CAMEO began in 2000 at the University of Kansas with financial support from the National Science Foundation. The first paper on the subject, by Deborah J. Gerner was written for the March 2002 Annual Meeting of the International Studies Association in New Orleans. In the paper, the authors noted that they worked on creating the new CAMEO system rather than continue using the existing WEIS coding system for a combination of reasons, including previously known weaknesses of WEIS and some difficulties that emerge when trying to automate the WEIS coding process. The coding software used for CAMEO, as well as for the automated WEIS implementation that CAMEO was compared with, was the Textual Analysis by Augmeted Replacement Instructions (TABARI) software developed by co-author Philip A. Schrodt in 2000, and was in turn based on the Kansas Event Data System (KEDS) developed in 1994.

The CAMEO manual describes the following key stages of the history of work on the project:

- Initial development of verb and actor ontology: (2000-2003): Deborah J. Gerner, Omur Yilmaz, Philip A. Schrodt
- Refinements of actor ontology (2004-2007): Dennis Hermrick, Baris Kesgin, Peter Picucci, Joseph Pull, Almas Sayeed, Sarah Stacey
- Organized Religion (2009-2011): Matthias Heilke
- Ethnic Groups (2011): Jay Yonamine, Benjamin Bagozzi

== Alternatives ==
One of the alternatives to CAMEO is Integrated Data for Events Analysis (IDEA), an outgrowth of work by the PANDA project. Predecessors to CAMEO include the World Interaction/Event Survey (WEIS) coding system by Charles A. McClelland and the Conflict and Peace Data Bank (COPDAB) by Edward Azar.

Some key differences between CAMEO and IDEA are:

- IDEA maintains backward compatibility with WEIS whereas CAMEO does not.
- CAMEO is focused on inter-state behavior, whereas IDEA encompasses a substantially broader range of behavior.
- The tertiary categories for IDEA are generally oriented towards the study of citizen direct action (for example strikes and protests), whereas the categories in CAMEO are oriented towards the study of third-party mediation in international and inter-ethnic conflict.

== Reception ==
=== Academic reception ===
CAMEO has been the subject of a number of academic papers comparing it with other coding frameworks.

== Datasets that use CAMEO coding ==
- Integrated Conflict Early Warning System (ICEWS)
- Global Database of Events, Language, and Tone (GDELT)
