= Forum on Early Warning and Early Response =

Non-profit organization devoted to conflict early warning

The Forum on Early Warning and Early Response (FEWER) was established in 1997 as a non-profit organization in response to the Rwandan genocide in 1994. Focusing on conflict early warning, the brainchild of Kumar Rupesinghe, Howard Adelman, and Sharon Rusu, became a network of 35 organisations worldwide and catalysed the creation of early warning and response networks in the Caucasus (led by EAWARN/Russian Academy of Sciences), the Great Lakes region of Africa (led by the Africa Peace Forum), and west Africa (led by West Africa Network for Peacebuilding (WANEP).

FEWER and its network members publish regular early warning reports from these regions, host strategic roundtables for integrated responses to conflict, and implemented a conflict-sensitive development research programme with Saferworld, International Alert, Africa Peace Forum, Consortium of Humanitarian Agencies, and Center for Conflict Resolution.

The FEWER Secretariat was first hosted by International Alert in London with funding from the Winston Foundation for World Peace and the Swedish Foreign Ministry. It then moved to independent premises on Brick Lane and was headed until May 2003 by David Nyheim, followed by Georg Frerks and Marcel Smits. In June 2004, the FEWER Board oversaw the closure of the London Secretariat and the decentralisation of early warning activities to FEWER's Moscow and Nairobi offices.
