= Manali Jagtap =

Indian designer and artist (born 1978)

- Born: 24 January 1978 (age 48); Kolhapur, Maharashtra, India
- Occupations: Designer and political artist

Manali Jagtap (born 24 January 1978) is an Indian designer and a political artist. She lives and works in Malta, India and the UK.

Manali was recognised as one of the Top 10 Indian Women Leaders in Europe by Women Entrepreneur India magazine in 2022.

Her works include human rights in story-telling (Gagado's Ancient Tales) in collaboration with Burmese artist, Htein Lin), and the politics of food (Mahatma Thali).

In 2013, she co-founded the Artraker Foundation along with International Conflict and Security (INCAS) Consulting and International Alert. The Artraker Foundation awards art that helps raise awareness, communicate, stimulate debate and transform our understanding of war, violent conflict and social upheaval. Marie-Louise Coleiro Preca, inaugurated the International Peace Exhibition held at Saint James Cavalier in 2017–18. The Artraker Biennial Awards were covered by The Guardian, Trebuchet Magazine, The Independent, BBC – Myanmar.

== Personal life ==
Manali Jagtap is divorced from her husband David Nyheim, and they have two sons.
