= Atrocity crime =

International crimes of genocide, war crimes, and crimes against humanity

An atrocity crime is a violation of international criminal law that falls under the historically three legally defined international crimes of genocide, war crimes, and crimes against humanity. Ethnic cleansing is widely regarded as a fourth mass atrocity crime by legal scholars and international non-governmental organizations (NGOs) working in the field, despite not yet being recognized as an independent crime under international law.

Crimes of aggression are considered by some to be mass atrocity crimes and they are included in the jurisdiction of the International Criminal Court. However, most legal scholars do not consider them to be mass atrocity crimes. While it is certainly a grave violation of international law and frequently the context in which mass atrocity crimes are committed, the crime of aggression is distinguishable because it is an attack on the territory, sovereignty, or political independence of a state rather than on individuals.

The primary international laws defining mass atrocity crimes are the 1948 Convention on the Prevention and Punishment of the Crime of Genocide, the 1949 Geneva Conventions and their 1977 Additional Protocols, and the 1998 Rome Statute of the International Criminal Court. The jurisprudence of the International Criminal Court, ad hoc international criminal tribunals, and the International Court of Justice further define and enforce these laws.

== Crimes against humanity ==
The term "crimes against humanity" has been applied to a wide range of acts and is often seen as broader than the other three mass atrocity crimes. While crimes against humanity can include many acts that also constitute war crimes, genocide, or ethnic cleansing, it bears distinguishing characteristics. Unlike war crimes, crimes against humanity may be committed in times of war or peace and can only be committed against civilian populations. Unlike genocide, the acts need not be targeted against a specific group.

Crimes against humanity have not been codified under a dedicated international treaty. The International Law Commission recently submitted a draft convention to the United Nations General Assembly that would include provisions prohibiting, punishing, and defining crimes against humanity. Despite not being the subject of a dedicated treaty, the prohibition against crimes against humanity is considered customary international law and an established norm, meaning it is binding on all states without exception.

The term has a long history of use both in political and legal contexts. Crimes against humanity, and similar terms, were used in the 18th century and early 19th century to describe slavery and atrocities committed as part of colonialism. Its first formal use in international law was a 1915 declaration condemning the Armenian genocide. Since then the term has been used and defined in similar, but variant ways by the Nuremberg Tribunal, Tokyo Tribunal, International Criminal Tribunal for the former Yugoslavia, International Criminal Tribunal for Rwanda, and International Criminal Court.

The Rome Statute reflects the latest consensus of the international community on the definition of crimes against humanity. The statute did not limit the definition to acts occurring in times of armed conflict, included a wider range of sexual violence as prohibited acts, and expanded the grounds on which persecution can be committed. The statute defines crimes against humanity as any of the following acts when committed as part of a widespread or systematic attack directed against any civilian population, with knowledge of the attack:

(a) Murder.
(b) Extermination;
(c) Enslavement;
(d) Deportation or forcible transfer of population;
(e) Imprisonment or other severe deprivation of physical liberty in violation of fundamental rules of international law;
(f) Torture;
(g) Rape, sexual slavery, enforced prostitution, forced pregnancy, enforced sterilization, or any other form of sexual violence of comparable gravity;
(h) Persecution against any identifiable group or collectivity on political, racial, national, ethnic, cultural, religious, gender...or other grounds that are universally recognized as impermissible under international law, in connection with any act referred to in this paragraph or any crime within the jurisdiction of the Court;
(i) Enforced disappearance of persons;
(j) The crime of apartheid;
(k) Other inhumane acts of a similar character intentionally causing great suffering, or serious injury to body or to mental or physical health.

== Genocide ==
At its most essential, "genocide" is acts committed with the intent to destroy a particular group. This destruction may be achieved by both fatal and non-fatal acts, ranging from slavery to rape and from mass killings to forced sterilizations. Like crimes against humanity, genocide can occur in times of peace or war. Genocide is characterized, in large part, by its specific intent requirement. While many of the constitutive acts of genocide are captured by the other atrocity crimes, and in fact were tried under crimes against humanity in the Nuremberg trials, modern conceptions note that the targeting of a protected group for destruction is unique to genocide.

Like crimes against humanity, the prohibition of genocide is customary international law and an established norm, meaning it is binding on all states without exception. In addition, it has been codified and included in the jurisdiction of several international adjudicatory bodies, including the International Criminal Tribunal for the former Yugoslavia, International Criminal Tribunal for Rwanda, and the International Criminal Court. In 1948, the United Nations General Assembly adopted the Convention on the Prevention and Punishment of Genocide (also known as the Genocide Convention), a dedicated treaty establishing multilateral obligations to act in the face of genocide.

Article II of the Genocide Convention defines genocide as "...any of the following acts committed with intent to destroy, in whole or in part, a national, ethnical, racial or religious group":

(a) Killing members of the group;
(b) Causing serious bodily or mental harm to members of the group;
(c) Deliberately inflicting on the group conditions of life calculated to bring about its physical destruction in whole or in part;
(d) Imposing measures intended to prevent births within the group;
(e) Forcibly transferring children of the group to another group.

== War crimes ==
War crimes are serious violations of the laws and customs governing armed conflict. The definition has evolved over time to include actions that occur not just in war between states, but also internal armed conflicts. War crimes run parallel to international humanitarian law — both contained primarily in the Geneva Conventions. International humanitarian law encompasses a wide range of treatment that different categories of only protected persons are entitled to, such as the humane treatment of enemy civilians under belligerent military occupations and non-discriminatory medical care for the wounded and sick or minimum conditions of detention for prisoners of war. Conversely, acts that rise to the level of war crimes are those with a particularly grave effect on persons, objects, and important values that give rise to criminal responsibility.

Customs governing armed conflict date back centuries, but the development and codification of the modern concept of war crimes began in the late 19th century with the drafting of The Hague Conventions defining restrictions on methods of warfare. The Geneva Conventions that emerged after World War II, as well as the Additional Protocols, provide the most robust framing of the laws of armed conflict. In addition, the definition and interpretation of war crimes were developed by the Nuremberg and Tokyo tribunals, the International Criminal Tribunal for the former Yugoslavia, the International Criminal Tribunal for Rwanda, and the International Criminal Court. Like crimes against humanity and genocide, it is also customary international law.

While no one document codifies all war crimes, the Rome Statute is the most recent consensus. It defines war crimes as "grave breaches of the Geneva Conventions" and lists "any of the following acts against persons or property protected under the provisions of the relevant Geneva Convention"

1. Willful killing, or causing great suffering or serious injury to body or health
2. Torture or inhumane treatment
3. Unlawful wanton destruction or appropriation of property
4. Forcing a prisoner of war to serve in the forces of a hostile power
5. Depriving a prisoner of war of a fair trial
6. Unlawful deportation, confinement or transfer
7. Taking hostages

The United Nations Framework of Analysis for Atrocity Crimes recognizes that the 1949 Geneva Conference protects four groups of people in armed conflict:

1. The wounded and sick in armed forces in the field
2. The wounded, sick, and shipwrecked members of armed forces at sea
3. Prisoners of war
4. Civilian persons

The 1977 Additional Protocols of the Geneva Conventions added more protected groups, including women, children, civilian medical personnel, and journalists.

== Ethnic cleansing ==
The term "ethnic cleansing" encompasses a broad range of unlawful actions with the intent of removing a group from a specific area. This may be done through non-violent acts, such as administrative regulations on movement and preventing access to medical care, education, or humanitarian aid. It can also be carried out through harassment and threats. Finally, ethnic cleansing can be carried out through violent measures including rape, torture, forced deportation, mass incarceration, killings, and attacks on political and cultural figures and sites. Much like other mass atrocity crimes, there is significant overlap between ethnic cleansing and the previously mentioned acts. It can be tried as a crime against humanity or, specifically during armed conflict, a war crime. Its relationship with genocide is particularly complicated due to the overlap in the intent to target a particular "national, ethnical, racial or religious group."

Ethnic cleansing is often discussed in tandem with genocide. For example, the International Court of Justice determined that most of the acts committed in Bosnia by Serb forces were "ethnic cleansing," but fell short of genocide. What distinguishes ethnic cleansing from genocide is intent. The purpose that drives ethnic cleansing is to render a specific region homogeneous through the often violent expulsion of a minority group as opposed to its destruction. So while the specific acts taken against a protected group may be identical, perpetrators of genocide would not be satisfied with the removal of the group if it did not render it destroyed, whereas perpetrators of an ethnic cleansing campaign would theoretically be satisfied.

Although ethnic cleansing has not been formally codified in an international treaty, the term has appeared in UN Security Council and General Assembly resolutions, the jurisprudence of the International Criminal Tribunal for the Former Yugoslavia, and reports by UN experts.

== Legal jurisdiction ==
=== International Criminal Court ===
The International Criminal Court (ICC) only has jurisdiction over those who have committed crimes against humanity, war crimes, genocide, or crimes of aggression. Its jurisdiction is further limited to crimes that occurred within the territory of a state that has accepted the jurisdiction of the ICC (through ratification of the Rome Statute or otherwise) and to situations referred to it by the UN Security Council. Despite the referral power of the Security Council, the Court itself is not officially affiliated with the United Nations. In order for the International Criminal Court to take a case, the state must be a signed member of the Rome Statute, as this puts a country within the jurisdiction of the Court. The ICC's jurisdiction is complementary to domestic courts. So if a perpetrator is tried at a national level court, the ICC does not intervene in the case.

=== Nuremberg trials ===
Prior to the publication of the Rome Statute and the formation of the International Criminal Court, violators of mass atrocity crimes would be brought to justice through international tribunals. Nuremberg was the first such example of these tribunals. Held as an International Military Tribunal (IMT) for the Nazis, Nuremberg became the first ever trial in which crimes against humanity had been held as a charge (they could not be charged with the crime of genocide, as it did not exist at the time). Of the 24 Nazi officials charged, 16 of them were found guilty of crimes against humanity.

=== International Criminal Tribunal for the former Yugoslavia ===
The International Criminal Tribunal for the former Yugoslavia (ICTY) is the United Nations court established in 1993 to prosecute mass atrocity crimes committed in the Balkans in the 1990s. It addresses crimes committed from 1991 to 2001 against members of various ethnic groups in the former Yugoslavia — Croatia, Bosnia and Herzegovina, Serbia, Kosovo and Macedonia. This was the first war crimes court established by the UN as well as the first international war crimes tribunal since the Nuremberg and Tokyo tribunals. The tribunal was established by the UN Security Council, acting under Chapter VII of the UN Charter. Since its inception, the ICTY has made precedent-setting decisions on mass atrocity crimes, including the precept that an individual's position does not protect them from prosecution. It has also set the precedent for individualized guilt in order to protect entire communities from being labelled "collectively responsible." It has held that the mass murder at Srebrenica was genocide as defined by international law. The ICTY has indicted over 160 individuals.

=== International Criminal Tribunal for Rwanda ===
The International Criminal Tribunal for Rwanda (ICTR) is an international court established by the UN Security Council to prosecute individuals of genocide and other mass atrocity crimes committed in Rwanda and neighboring states between January 1, 1994 and December 31, 1994. The ICTR is the first international tribunal to deliver verdicts of genocide and the first to interpret 1948 Genocide Convention's definition of genocide. It is also the first tribunal to define rape as a means of committing genocide as well as to hold members of media responsible for broadcasts as a tool of genocide. The ICTR's last trial judgement was on December 20, 2012 and is now working on appeals only. Since it opened in 1995, of the 93 individuals have been indicted by the ICTR, 62 have been found guilty of international humanitarian crimes and sentenced, 10 have been referred to national jurisdictions, 2 have died prior to verdicts, 3 fugitives have been referred to the International Residual Mechanism for Criminal Tribunals, and 2 indictments were withdrawn before their trials started.

=== International Court of Justice ===
The International Court of Justice (ICJ) is the principal judicial organ of the United Nations. It can hear two types of cases: contentious and advisory. Contentious cases are legal disputes between states which can only be brought by states. The only mass atrocity crime that the ICJ has jurisdiction over is genocide. Its jurisdiction was established explicitly in the Genocide Convention. Unlike the tribunals discussed above, the ICJ cannot determine individual criminal responsibility. It can clarify and interpret the Genocide Convention as well as hold states accountable for the commission or the failure to prevent or punish genocide.

== Diplomatic agreements ==
=== Responsibility to protect ===
At the 2005 World Summit, the United Nations member states made a commitment to protect against genocide, war crimes, ethnic cleansing, and crimes against humanity. This document is not binding legal agreement, but rather reaffirms all states' responsibility to protect their own populations from atrocity crimes. It additionally holds the international community responsible for holding other states' accountable for their populations. In accordance with Chapters VI, VII, and VIII of the United Nations charter, the United Nations acknowledged at the summit its responsibility to help protect all populations through peaceful means, as well as through collective action when necessary.

== See also ==
- Atrocity crimes during the Russo-Ukrainian War
- Atrocity propaganda
- Humanitarian intervention
- State crime
- Worldwide Atrocities Dataset
