= Emmanuel Bombande =

Ghanaian diplomat

- Born: Lamusa Bombande; 6 December 1960 (age 64); Accra, Ghana
- Education: B.A. Social Science, Kwame Nkrumah University of Science and Technology, Kumasi, Ghana; D.E.F Cheikh Anta Diop University, Dakar, Senegal; M.A. Conflict Transformation, Center for Justice and Peacebuilding, Eastern Mennonite University, Harrisonburg, Virginia, United States
- Known for: Acting Chairperson on The Truth, Justice and Reconciliation Commission of Kenya
- Awards: Millennium Excellence Award for Peace in Ghana: 2005; Laureate CIVIPAX: Burkina Faso 2007

Emmanuel Bombande (born 1960) in Accra, Ghana is a conflict resolution, peacebuilding, development professional and former deputy foreign minister from 2015 to 2017 under the NDC government of His excellency president John Mahama. Bombande is the Chair of the Board of the Global Partnership for the Prevention of Armed Conflict.

== Early life and education ==
Upon moving to Bawku to live with his grandmother, Bombande began attending Bawku Daduri R/C Primary School followed by Daduri R/C Middle School in Bawku. He then attended Notre Dame Seminary Secondary School, in Navrongo, and Nandom Secondary School, in Nandom for his A levels. While at Nandom he became involved with the Young Catholic Students Movement, later named the Young Christian Students (YCS), an organization he later served as Pan-African Co-ordinator for during his national service. In 1984, Bomande continued his education by pursuing a B.A. in Social Science at Kwame Nkrumah University of Science and Technology, Kumasi, Ghana. He also completed his D.E.F. at Cheikh Anta Diop University, Dakar, Senegal. In 2002 he completed his M.A. in Conflict Transformation, from the Center for Justice and Peacebuilding at Eastern Mennonite University, Harrisonburg, Virginia, USA.

== Career ==
Emmanuel Bombande's began his career in 1990 working with the group International Young Catholic Students (IYCS), becoming the Africa Regional Coordinator. The organization focuses on faith-based development work globally and also have special consultative status with the United Nations Economic and Social Council. This position was based in Nairobi, Kenya and continued for four years. In August 1994, he became a program officer at Nairobi Peace Initiative. The Nairobi Peace Initiative was founded in 1984 and engages in peacebuilding and conflict transformation work including mediation, dialogue facilitation, and capacity building throughout the Horn, East, Central, and West Africa. During this time he was crucial in resolving the Kokomba-Nanumba conflict in northern Ghana. Under the leadership of Hizkias Assefa, Bombande organized a number of meetings and dialogues between the warring factions. His interactions with tribal kings during negotiations was referenced by John Paul Lederach in giving examples of how power differentials can negatively impact mediations and negotiations. While at NPI he also worked with interethnic conflicts in the Rift Valley of Kenya, and facilitating dialogue in the eastern part of the Democratic Republic of the Congo.

=== West Africa Network for Peacebuilding (WANEP) ===
In 1998, Bombande cofounded, with Sam Doe, the West Africa Network for Peacebuilding (WANEP). Focusing on collaborative approaches to conflict prevention during the civil wars taking place in West Africa. The organization works with several regional partners such as the Economic Community of West African States (ECOWAS) and the African Union's Economic, Social, and Cultural Council (ECOSOCC). From 1999 through September 2004, Bombande worked as Director of Programmes for WANEP. In this position he worked directly with the Bawku Inter-Ethnic Conflict. Upper East Region-Ghana, and the Intra-Dagbon Akosombo Dialogue Process.

In 2004, Bombande began his tenure as executive director at WANEP. Shortly thereafter, in 2005 he was awarded the Millennium Excellence Peace Award citing his dedication “to using peace methods to ensure the co-existence of all in our society.” The other recipient of that award in 2005 was former U.N. Secretary General Kofi Annan. From 2005-2007, Bombande was involved in resolving the Nkonya-Alavanyo Conflict in the Volta Region-Ghana as well as the helping to facilitate the national dialogue between the government and civil society organizations in Togo. During this time Bombande also became the Chair of the Board of the Global Partnership for the Prevention of Armed Conflict (GPPAC).

Bombande's long tenure at WANEP has not been without some controversy. In 2006 a disagreement with future Nobel Peace Prize winner Leymah Gbowee over the ownership of the Women in Peacebuilding Network (WIPNET), a program of WANEP, led her to separate from the organization and form another organization Women in Peace and Security Network with Thelma Ekiyor and Ecoma Alaga. His own organization has not escaped his critical eye as he has upbraided the organization in the media regarding reports released too soon, or with too inflammatory language leading to social and civil unrest.

=== Teaching engagements ===
In addition to his work with WANEP and GPPAC, Mr. Bombande is an Advisor to the Geneva-based Centre for Humanitarian Dialogue on Dialogue and Mediation Efforts in Africa and a Fellow of the Society for Peace Studies and Practice (spsp) of the University of Ibadan, Nigeria. He also teaches at the Kofi Annan International Peacekeeping Training Centre (KAIPTC), Legon Center for International Affairs (LECIA), the West Africa Peacebuilding Institute (WAPI), and conducts training with Caritas International. Bombande is often cited in the Ghanaian news media commenting on local and regional conflicts.

== Personal life ==
He was born in Accra, Ghana. Originally named Lamusa, his grandmother changed his name to Habuka, which in Bisa means “Where is he from?”. He took the name Emmanuel after his baptism. He and his wife Alice have three children. He is an outspoken critic of several local politicians citing their divisive tactics and hate speech. Despite this he has frequently stated that Ghana is in a more stable and peaceful place than many of its neighbors given the tradition of strong civil society organizations.

== Works ==
Publications:

- “Conflicts, Civil Society Organizations and Community Peacebuilding Practices in Northern Ghana” in Ethnicity, Conflicts and Consensus in Ghana. Woeli Publishing Services, Accra, 2007.
- "A View from West Africa", in A Handbook of International Peacebuilding: INTO THE EYE OF A STORM. Ed. John Paul Lederach, Janice Moomaw Jenner, Jossey-Bass Publications. 2002
- Consultant and Trainer. Youth Peace Training Manual. AACC Publications 1999
- “Ghana. Difficult Journey towards National Reconciliation”, The Northern Advocate, 2002.
- Peacebuilding Efforts in Northern Ghana: Lessons for Local Authorities. 2007
- “Developing an Institutional Framework for Sustainable Peace: UN, Government and Civil Society Collaboration for Conflict Prevention in Ghana” in Joint Action for Prevention: Civil Society and Government Cooperation on Conflict Prevention and Peacebuilding, European Centre for Conflict Prevention / Global Partnership for the Prevention of Armed Conflict, 2007
