= UNGP =

UNGP may refer to:

- UN General Protocol for SDGs
- UNGP for SDGs
- United Nations Guiding Principles on Business and Human Rights
- United Nations Global Pulse
- United Nations Global Platform
