= Michael D. Ward =

Michael Don Ward (August 24, 1948–July 9, 2021) was an American political scientist and academic. He was professor emeritus of political science at Duke University, an affiliate of the Duke Network Analysis Center, and the principal investigator at Ward Lab, a website that creates conflict predictions using Bayesian modeling and network analysis. He is the founder of Predictive Heuristics, a consultancy that does risk analysis for a variety of clients.

== Biography ==
Ward was born in Japan to an American military family.

Ward received a B. A. (Hons) from Indiana University in 1970 where he studied with Dina A. Zinnes and John Gillespie. He served in the United States Army with the 287th Military Police Company (Separate) in the Berlin Brigade from 1970 to 1972. Subsequently, he earned a Ph.D. in political science from Northwestern University in 1977. He wrote his dissertation on the political economy of inequality which was later published as The Political Economy of Distribution: Equality Versus Inequality.

He was the Gordon Scott Fulcher Research Fellow where he worked with Harold Guetzkow from 1977 to 1979. He then joined the Science Center Berlin, working with Karl Wolfgang Deutsch and others for two years building a global political model. After leaving the Science Center, he was appointed Associate Professor of political science at the University of Colorado in 1981, where he was Director of the Center for International Relations. He later moved to the University of Washington in 1997 where he was a founding member of the Center for Statistics and the Social Sciences, serving on its executive board for a decade. In 2009, he joined the faculty of Duke University, and established wardlab which was focused on conflict predictions. At the time of his death he was an emeritus professor at Duke University, an elected fellow of the Society for Political Methodology, and an affiliate professor at the University of Washington.

== Academic work and reception ==
Ward is the author of two books on statistical methods and one book on world geography, as well as editor or co-editor of three books on political science and political geography.

Ward was the principal investigator at Ward Lab, a research lab of graduate and undergraduate students at Duke. It is also a website that creates conflict predictions using Bayesian modeling and network analysis. The lab also runs Predictive Heuristics, one of the foremost blogs on global political forecasting and conflict forecasting.

Ward's article "The perils of policy by p-value", along with Brian D. Greenhill and Kristin M. Bakke, was included by political scientist Jay Ulfelder in his list of suggested readings for political forecasters. Phil Schrodt commented that this work is "in terms of political prediction using formal models, easily the most important work in the past quarter century."

Ward is also known for having a relatively optimistic outlook about the ability to forecast potential conflicts and crises, putting him at odds with Jay Ulfelder, as expressed in an article by Ulfelder for Foreign Policy and a response by Ward and Metternich in the same magazine. Ulfelder later clarified his position and indicated that the disagreement was less deep than it seemed. A paper co-authored by Ward and others at Ward Lab received a mixed review from Ulfelder, who agreed with the author's goals and their assessment of the importance of the scientific value and policy relevance of forecasting, but considered the author's attempt in the paper to be overly ambitious.
