= Conflict early warning =

The field of conflict early warning seeks to forecast the outbreak of armed conflict, or, at minimum, to detect the early escalation of violence, with the objective of preventing the outbreak or the further escalation of violence in order to save lives.

Initial conceptions of conflict early warning materialized in the 1970s and 1980s but the field really emerged on the international policy agenda after the end of the Cold War. Both qualitative and quantitative approaches have been developed for conflict forecasting and conflict monitoring. Qualitative methodologies typically draw on local area experts with extensive knowledge on one country or region. This is the approach taken by the International Crisis Group, for example. In contrast, quantitative methodologies quantify conflict trends and use mathematical techniques to forecast future trends or "events of interest" (EOIs) such as the onset of conflicts. For example, the Integrated Conflict Early Warning System (ICEWS) project at the Defense Advanced Research Projects Agency (DARPA) takes this approach. Some approaches to conflict early warning combine both qualitative and quantitative methodologies, such as Swisspeace's formerly operational project called FAST.

== Origins ==
The unanticipated events of the Yom Kippur War in 1973 and that of the Falklands War in 1982 provoked a series of debates over the lack of early warning. The incident over the Falklands had taken the United Nations completely by surprise and it is said "no map of the islands was available in the Secretariat when the invasion began". The initial drivers, however, were humanitarian agencies "driven by the need for accurate and timely predictions of refugee flows to enable effective contingency planning". After the end of the Cold War, political scientists at leading academic institutions began modifying old Cold War models of conflict to understand the onset of new wars. The horrors of the 1994 Rwandan genocide also spurred increased interest in operational conflict early warning systems. The FAST project of Swisspeace and the Forum on Early Warning and Early Response (FEWER) were responses to the genocide.

== See also ==
- Conflict resolution
- Continental Early Warning System
- International Alert
- Preventive diplomacy
