= Exploitation of natural resources =

Use of natural resources for economic growth

The exploitation of natural resources describes using natural resources, often non-renewable or limited, for economic growth or development. Environmental degradation, human insecurity, and social conflict frequently accompany natural resource exploitation. The impacts of the depletion of natural resources include the decline of economic growth in local areas; however, the abundance of natural resources does not always correlate with a country's material prosperity. Many resource-rich countries, especially in the Global South, face distributional conflicts, where local bureaucracies mismanage or disagree on how resources should be used. Foreign industries also contribute to resource exploitation, where raw materials are outsourced from developing countries, with the local communities receiving little profit from the exchange. This is often accompanied by negative effects of economic growth around the affected areas such as inequality and pollution.

The exploitation of natural resources started to emerge on an industrial scale in the 19th century as the extraction and processing of raw materials (such as in mining, steam power, and machinery) expanded much further than it had in pre-industrial areas. During the 20th century, energy consumption rapidly increased. As of 2012, about 78.3% of the world's energy consumption is sustained by the extraction of fossil fuels, which consists of oil, coal and natural gas.

Another non-renewable resource humans exploit is subsoil minerals, such as precious metals, mainly used to produce industrial commodities. Intensive agriculture is an example of a mode of production that hinders many aspects of the natural environment, for example the degradation of forests in a terrestrial ecosystem and water pollution in an aquatic ecosystem. As the world population rises and economic growth occurs, the depletion of natural resources influenced by the unsustainable extraction of raw materials becomes an increasing concern. The continuous alteration of the environment through water, mineral, and forest exploitation poses increased risks of climate-based displacement and conflict stemming from scarcity, which threaten to perpetuate social inequities.

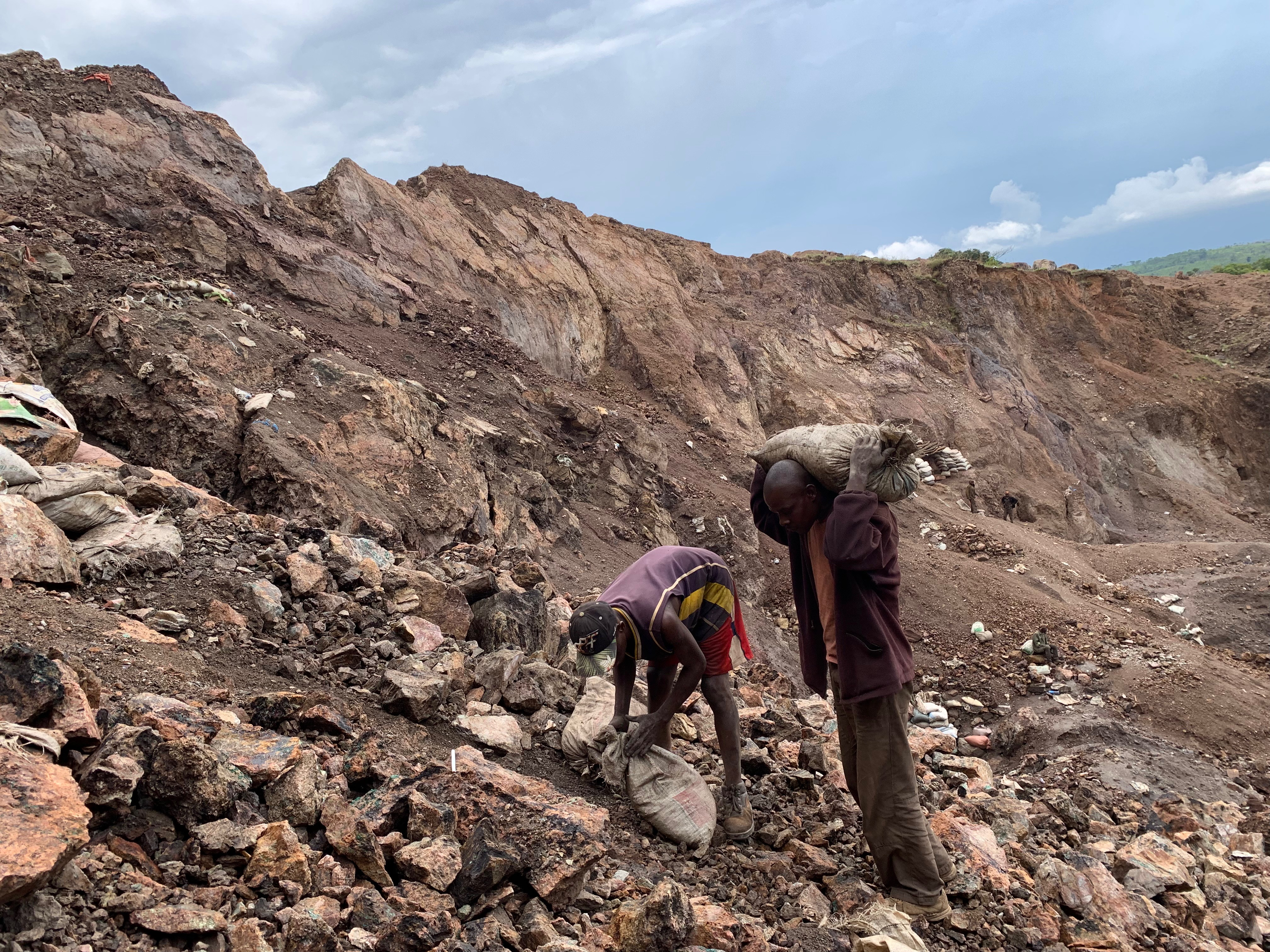
Revenue from mineral exports makes up a large portion of the Democratic Republic of Congo's economy. While Congo is rich in mineral resources, these deposits require extensive manual labor to extract, often under life-threatening conditions. Mining of cobalt is leading to human rights being abused in ways such as unsafe worksites, child labor, and forced Congolese labor, in addition to environmental degradation.

== Causes ==
- Advancing technology: Increasing technological sophistication enables faster rates of natural resource extraction. For example, in the past, it could take a long time to log a small amount of trees using only saws. Due to better technology, the rates of deforestation have greatly increased.
- Overconsumption has created a high demand for natural resources, further exacerbating natural resource exploitation
- Development of new technologies, such as electric vehicles and portable technologies, e.g., smartphones, also heavily rely on cobalt mining, often leading to loss of green cover and detrimental health impacts for surrounding communities, often in developing countries like the D.R. of Congo where mining occurs.
- Consumerism: Unsustainable consumption, driven by both population growth and materialistic ideologies, increases the demand for production and, thereby, the extraction of the natural resources needed to supply this demand. For instance, the consumption of fine jewelry leads to increased mining of gold and diamonds. The extraction of precious metals like gold has degradation effects on the environment, such as loss of forestry during construction of the mining facilities, increased exposure to toxic materials, and disturbance of the nearby ecosystem.
- Management thinking: In relation to the previous point, companies have adopted the idea according to which the rarer the resource, the more it contributes to the company's competitive advantage. When it comes to natural resources, such an idea leads to natural resource exhaustion.
- A general lack of respect for native land rights leads to increased exploitation of natural resources on and around native land.

== Consequences of exploitation of resources ==
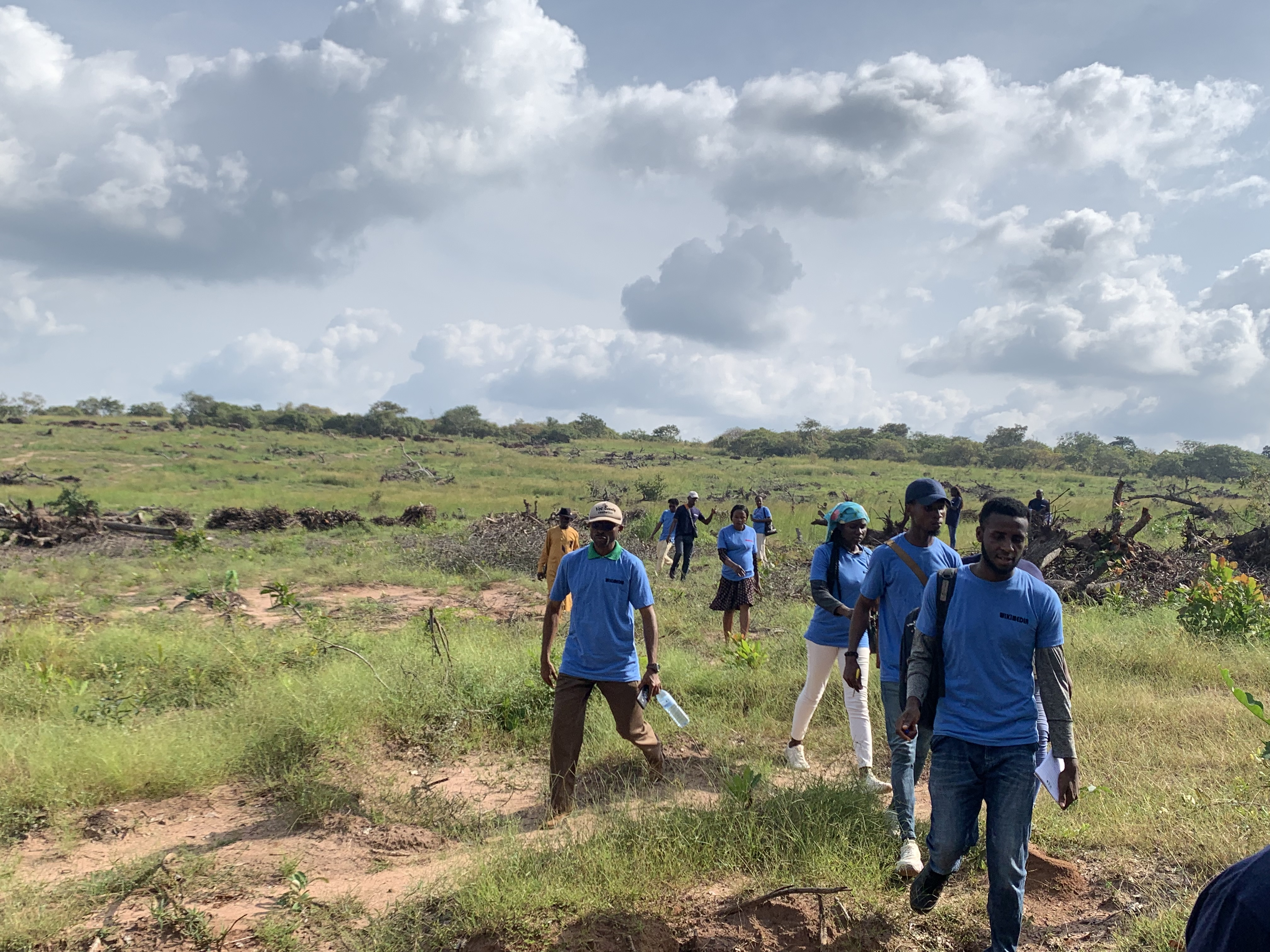
A deforestation in Nigeria team patrolling the deforestation site. Nigeria has experienced an increase in deforestation in part due to expansion of agriculture, lumbering, and urban growth. These land-use changes are driven by population increase and poverty.

Natural resources are not limitless, and the following consequences can arise from the careless and excessive consumption of these resources:

- Deforestation: Removal of trees for use as resources, such as in agriculture or industry, can lead to large-scale destruction of forests. Around 40% of the Earth's original forest cover has been lost in the last 8000 years.
- Desertification: Human-led changes in land management practices lead to changes in the ecological characteristics of a region. Land mismanagement and climate change can lead to a loss of ecosystem services, such as through degradation of soil. Together, these losses can result in desertification seen in arid and dry areas.
- Decrease in natural resources: When resources are exploited faster than they can be replenished, it results in an overall decrease in natural resources in an area.
- Extinction of species: Processes involved in resource exploitation can directly or indirectly lead to the extinction of species. Animals used for resources can be directly hunted, while destruction of environments, such as through harvesting timber, can also cause extinctions.
- Forced migration
- Soil erosion
- Oil depletion
- Ozone depletion
- Greenhouse gas increase
- Water gasification
- Natural hazard/Natural disaster
- Metals and minerals depletion.
- Indigenous groups have limited ways to relate to the environment and survive on traditional food and water sources

== Economic consequences ==
Natural resources are vital for human survival, however, if their consumption surpasses their natural replenishment rate, the resources can become depleted. According to the United Nations Food and Agriculture Organization, around 33% of the Earth's soils are presently classified as moderately to highly degraded, with projections indicating that more than 90% could face degradation by the year 2050 and thus cause significant economic consequences. With such rate of erosion of fertile soil, agricultural commodity prices tend to increase significantly. The connection between the consumption rate and the supply rate of resources holds significant implications for long-term economic growth, as sustained high consumption rates of certain resources ultimately jeopardize economic sustainability. For instance, in the case of extracting soil minerals, supply rate is exceedingly slow over geological time spans, inevitably leading to a consumption rate surpassing the supply rate. Such a scenario is evidently unsustainable in the long run. To ensure sustainability, the consumption rate must remain equal to or less than the supply rate.

There has been an ongoing debate among scholars and researchers on the economic implications of dependence on natural resources. Natural resources yield economic rents that can be allocated towards public welfare initiatives and other projects beneficial to local communities. However, in the long term, uncertainties linked to potentially unstable terms of trade for commodities might lead to decline in public finances and deter investment. For instance, if oil prices decline, it may lead to fiscal unease in significant petroleum-producing countries such as Russia, Qatar, and Saudi Arabia. Resource abundance challenges the progress of political and governance institutions by nurturing a culture of rentierism. For instance, revenues obtained from resources can be used for political manipulation. Additionally, extra capital from resources can dilute government accountability to both citizens and businesses by abandoning taxation completely, which leads to lack of government incentive to support economic growth through innovation. At the same time, citizens may lack the motives to advocate for better governance and transparency.

Because of environmental pollution, cities whose economies rely on natural resources face difficulties in attracting technology-driven businesses and skilled labor, posing significant challenges to their economic transformation and advancement. These resource-centric cities face disadvantages in the competition among local governments striving for environmental quality. Analyzing panel data spanning from 2005 to 2017 for 30 coal-mining cities, it's been discovered that environmental regulations offer a new approach to potentially reversing the adverse effects of resource dependence, and thus fueling greener sustainable development in coal-mining regions.

Despite the inevitability of environmental contamination associated with resource extraction because of current mining technologies, this pollution delays residents' engagement in agricultural and aqua cultural activities, which are negatively influenced by environmental conditions. As a result, these cities tend to rely heavily on a singular economic development model centered around resource exploitation, making them ill-equipped to address environmental crises effectively. Economic gains from natural resources are mostly beneficial when directed towards initiatives such as job creation, skill enhancement, capacity building, and pursuit of long-term developmental objectives. Thus, reliance on one or more natural resources holds financial risk when aiming for a stable economic growth.

== Impacts of settler colonialism ==
Multiple scholars have explained how Settler colonialism has had profound influence on the dynamics of resource exploitation throughout history, especially in regions where settler populations have previously asserted dominance over indigenous peoples and their territories. Among these scholars Dina Gilio-Whitaker, an expert in Native American Studies from California State University explains that, “Indigenous peoples fighting for political autonomy from the hegemony of the State are fighting the forces of colonialism while simultaneously fighting capitalism—all aimed at control of land and resources" This encompasses the establishment of permanent settler communities, typically accompanied by the displacement, marginalization, or even extermination of indigenous populations. Settler Colonial exploration is most often driven by the pursuit of land and resources which has historically created the exploitation of natural wealth to fuel economic growth, infrastructure development, and territorial expansion.

One of the key way which settler colonialism drives resource exploitation is through the appropriation of indigenous lands and natural resources. Kyle Powys Whyte, an expert in natural resources and the environment highlights how the continued legacy of settler colonialism continues to harm indigenous communities. In his piece “The Dakota Access Pipeline, Environmental Injustice, and US Settler Colonialism” he writes, “as climate change becomes more apparent in its homelands, the shifting plant and animal habitats tied to agriculture, wildlife, and ceremonial species, as well as the loss of territory and resources as a result of US settler colonialism, will make it harder to adjust.”

Settler societies often view the land as a commodity to be exploited for economic gain, leading to the establishment of extractive industries such as mining, logging, and agriculture on indigenous territories. This exploitation is facilitated by legal frameworks that prioritize settler property rights over indigenous land tenure systems, resulting in the dispossession and displacement of indigenous communities from their ancestral lands. Moreover, settler colonialism often entails the imposition of Western concepts of land ownership and resource management that marginalize indigenous knowledge and practices, further exacerbating environmental degradation and social injustice.

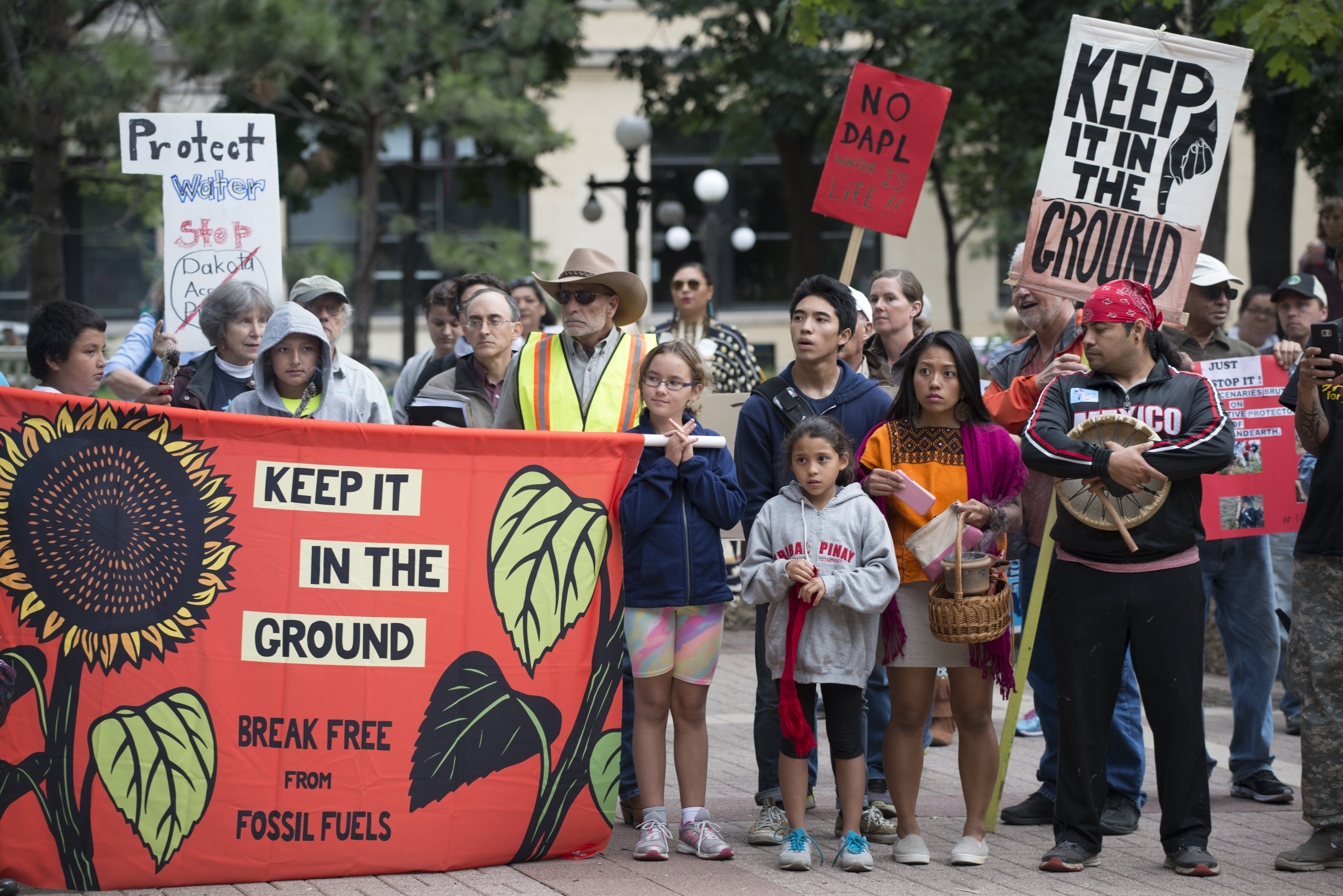
Dakota Access Pipeline protest

== Impacts of industrialization and globalization ==
Industrialization, the large scale growth of industry, has had profound impacts on natural resource exploitation. As societies undergo industrialization, there is an increased demand for raw materials to fuel manufacturing, construction, and energy production. As outlined by Farhan Ahmed, professor of economics and finance, industrialization can bring a myriad of challenges for natural resources. In his piece “The environmental impact of industrialization and foreign direct investment: empirical evidence from Asia-Pacific region” Ahmed writes “In addition to the many benefits of foreign direct investment and industrialization that have affected economic growth, both have significant potential for environmental degradation because most of their activities are related to the production and exploitation of natural resources."

This demand often leads to intensified extraction activities, such as mining, logging, and drilling, which can result in extensive habitat destruction, deforestation, and ecosystem degradation. Additionally, industrial processes often generate pollution and waste, further exacerbating environmental impacts and threatening ecosystems and biodiversity. industrialization has been associated with the commodification of natural resources, where resources are valued primarily for their economic potential rather than their intrinsic ecological or cultural value. This commodification mindset often leads to unsustainable exploitation practices, as resources are overexploited for short-term economic gain without consideration for long-term environmental sustainability.

Globalization has significantly impacted resource exploitation by reshaping patterns of production, consumption, and trade on a global scale. The interconnectedness of economies and the proliferation of multinational corporations have led to increased competition for access to natural resources, such as minerals, fossil fuels, timber, and agricultural products, in diverse regions around the world. This heightened demand for resources has driven intensified extraction activities, often in environmentally sensitive areas, and has contributed to the overexploitation and depletion of finite resources. Haiying Liu, professor of economics, explains how globalization results in more environmental stress in her piece “Impact of governance and globalization on natural resources volatility”. In this piece she writes, “In addition to natural resources exported from the region, the technical capability required to explore natural resources is also dependent on economic globalization. Environmental pressure increases as a result of globalization.”

Globalization has spurred the development of complex supply chains and trade networks that connect resource-rich regions with centers of production and consumption across the globe. While this interconnectedness has fueled economic growth and development in some regions, it has also led to the commodification and commercialization of natural resources, where resources are valued primarily for their economic potential rather than their intrinsic ecological or cultural value. Globalization has contributed to the unequal distribution of benefits and burdens associated with resource exploitation, with marginalized communities often bearing the environmental and social costs of resource extraction while multinational corporations and rich nations reap the profits

== Effects on local communities ==
=== Papua New Guinea ===
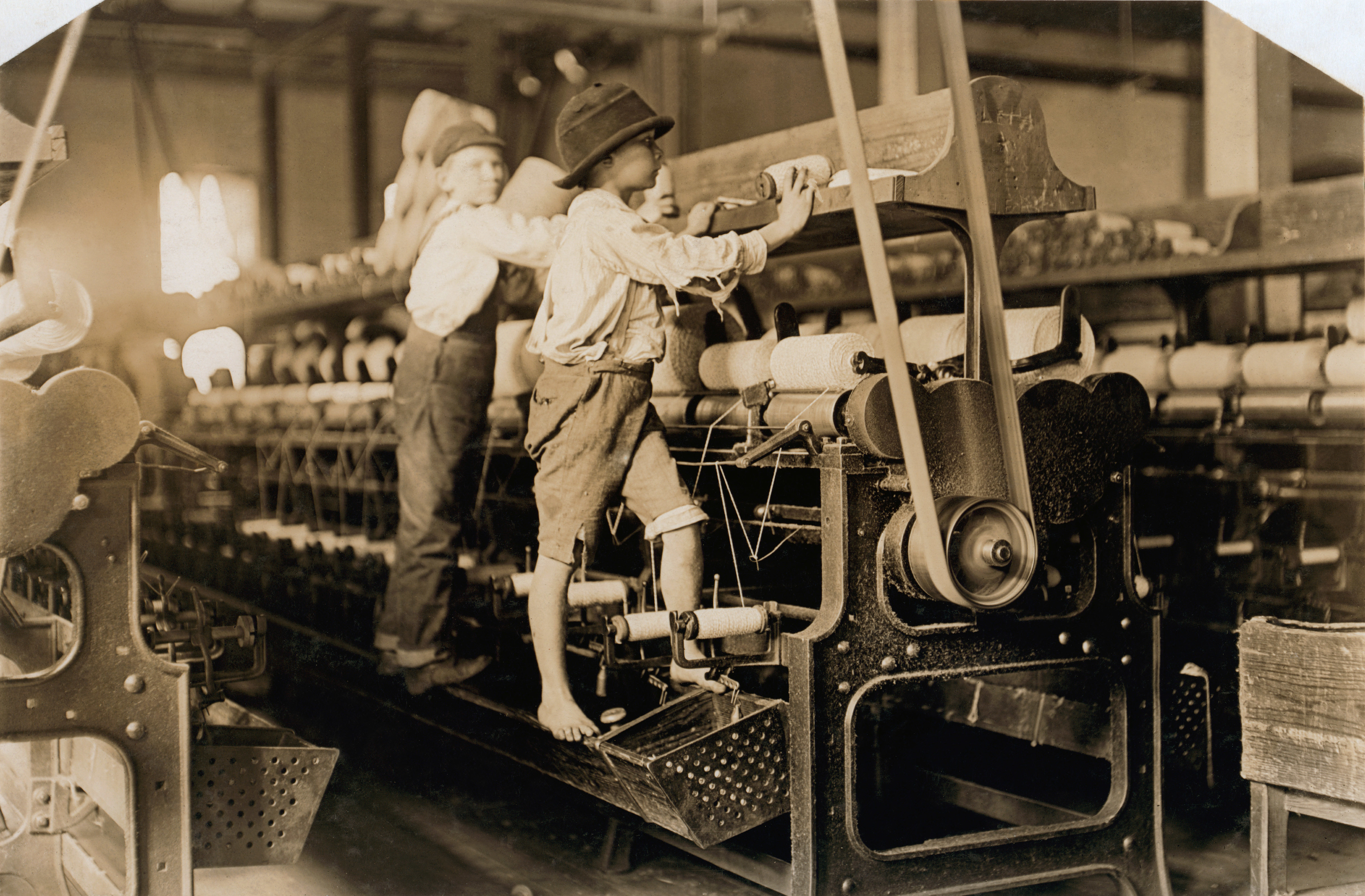
Human Resources Macon, Georgia, 1909

When a mining company enters a developing country in the global south to extract raw materials, advocating the advantages of the industry's presence and minimizing the potential negative effects gain the cooperation of the local people. Advantageous factors are primarily in economic development establishments, such as health centers, police departments, and schools, that the government may not provide. However, these advantages are not always distributed evenly among local populations, and the income generated from extracting natural resources can result in internal conflict within the developing country. In addition to unequal distribution, the adaption of consumerist values also results in conflict over resources within local communities.

Despite being rich in natural resources, the Democratic Republic of Congo is one country in the global south suffering from the effects of the resource curse. Its valuable copper and cobalt mineral deposits make Congo vulnerable to local and international conflict over the distribution of resources. These conflicts, along with the environmental degradation effects of mining, exacerbate high poverty rates, which approximately 64% of the Congolese population live under. Natural resource extraction and climate change are intertwined in Congo, as mining for copper and cobalt creates a biodiversity loss as green covers are cleared for constructing artisanal mines and roadways. Conflict over resources, poverty, and environmental degradation leaves a large number of the Congolese population vulnerable to internal displacement, lacking resources to adapt to climate change. Beyond climate impacts, mineral mining has also been linked with adverse health impacts, such as high levels of cobalt in urine and blood samples in populations located on or near industrial mines. Mining ores pose health risks long after mining has ceased, as wastelands generate toxic metal-rich dust. The injustice perpetrated by unsafe mining ores is not exclusive to the adult and child laborers. Instead, it impacts the whole country as low wages for high-risk mining worsen poverty rates, exacerbating negative social impacts such as conflict, higher crime rates, and child mortality.

The effects of the exploitation of natural resources in the local community of a developing country are also exhibited in the impacts from the Ok Tedi Mine. After BHP entered into Papua New Guinea to exploit copper and gold, the economy of the indigenous peoples boomed. Although their quality of life has improved, initially disputes were common among the locals in terms of land rights and who should be getting the benefits from the mining project. The consequences of the Ok Tedi environmental disaster illustrate the potential negative effects from the exploitation of natural resources. The resulting mining pollution includes toxic contamination of the natural water supply for communities along the Ok Tedi River, causing widespread killing of aquatic life. When a mining company ends a project after extracting the raw materials from an area of a developing country, the local people are left to manage with the environmental damage done to their community and the long run sustainability of the economic benefits stimulated by the mining company's presence becomes a concern.

=== Puerto Rico ===

Puerto Rico is another case of natural resource exploitation, specifically, oil exploitation. Massive multinational oil companies have been exploiting Puerto Rico for decades, and it has had an extremely negative impact on their environment, economy, and politics. As a result, Puerto Rico's communities are suing Exxon and about a dozen other oil companies for damages connected to Hurricanes Maria and Irma. This is because, according to the lawsuit, studies have shown that the intensity of those hurricanes was caused by climate-warming pollution, and those oil companies are responsible for up to 40% of industrial greenhouse gas emissions.

Politically, Puerto Rico and the United States' connection is complicated. While it is considered US territory and the civilians are given US citizenship, they are still not given the same rights as citizens in the states because it is not officially recognized as a US state. They are unable to vote in federal elections or have full representation in Congress. They must follow federal laws but aren't given the rights of states. The only power that can grant them statehood is Congress. This position of power is called being identified as the commonwealth. This severely limits their ability to advocate for what they need, for aid, or for the rights of their people.

Puerto Rico's economy is heavily reliant on fossil fuel energy both economically and for their communities. As the lawsuit states, the environmental impacts that are a result of these oil multinational companies exploiting Puerto Rico for their natural resources vary, but it focuses on its contribution to the impact and power of these natural disasters. Specifically, after the devastating impacts of Hurricanes Maria and Irma, the energy infrastructure was completely destroyed. As a result, there was an 11-month blackout period.

Due to their energy problems, PREPA, which was an energy company owned by the state, was privatized in an effort to minimize the energy prices. It, however, had the opposite effect as a result. It instead raised the energy prices. Puerto Rico now must pay almost twice as much for their energy and is experiencing frequent outages. Even though the 11-month power outage highlighted the overdependency on fossil fuels for energy, 94% of their electricity is powered by fossil fuels. This weakens the economic power of Puerto Rico, and, therefore, its overall influence.

Overall, these oil corporations have so heavily exploited Puerto Rico and its environment that they are to this day heavily reliant on those fossil fuels. This dependency has an extreme negative impact on their economy, relating to energy prices. The oppression on their environment, economy, and energy, along with their lack of political power in the US, has left Puerto Rico in a very bad situation where they don't have much power or influence to get out of it.

== Responses and solutions ==
Responses and solutions to natural resource exploitation have emerged across the globe as communities and stakeholders grapple with the environmental, social, and economic impacts of unsustainable practices. These movements often employ a variety of tactics, including protests, legal challenges, boycotts, and direct actions, to challenge destructive practices and promote alternatives that prioritize environmental sustainability, social justice, and community well-being. Additionally, there has been growing recognition of the importance of indigenous knowledge, traditional ecological practices, and community-based approaches in addressing the root causes of resource exploitation and advancing sustainable development goals.

=== Resistance to mining in Peru ===
Resistance to natural resource exploitation in the developing countries is often intertwined with broader social and economic struggles. Many communities facing exploitation are marginalized and economically disadvantaged which exacerbates the unequal power dynamics at play. Resistance movements often demand not only environmental justice but also fair compensation, employment opportunities, and community development initiatives. Solidarity networks, both within countries and internationally, have been crucial in amplifying the voices of affected communities and exerting pressure on governments and corporations to adopt more sustainable and equitable practices. Despite facing significant challenges, these movements continue to inspire hope for a more just and sustainable future in the Global South and beyond.

Anti-mining protests in Peru have emerged as a significant expression of resistance against large-scale mining projects that pose environmental and social threats to local communities. One notable instance is the resistance against the Conga mining project in the Cajamarca region. José Manuyama Ahuit, a native Peruvian activist working against local mining, was quoted saying, “The river forms part of our spirit and culture. If the river dies, so does our human dignity, now this river is doomed. The colour of the water is changing, and the same devastation in other mining areas is beginning to be reproduced here in the Nanay. Local communities, including farmers and indigenous groups, have vehemently opposed the project due to concerns of water contamination and depletion. The proposed mining operation, led by multinational corporations, has been met with widespread demonstrations, blockades, and legal challenges. These protests underscore broader issues of environmental protection and indigenous rights, as communities seek to safeguard their lands and livelihoods from the detrimental impacts of resource extraction.

In response to the anti-mining protests, Peruvian authorities have often deployed security forces to quell dissent, leading to clashes and instances of violence. These clashes have resulted in injuries and fatalities on both sides, escalating tensions between mining companies, local communities, and the government. Efforts to find a peaceful resolution to the conflict have been disrupted by deep-seated mistrust and differing interests among the stakeholders involved.

== Resistance in Native American communities ==
Resistance to natural resource exploitation in native communities has been a recurring theme throughout history, as indigenous people have sought to protect their lands, cultures, and ways of life from the adverse impacts of extractive industries. In many cases, indigenous resistance movements have emerged as powerful forces advocating for environmental justice, indigenous rights, and sovereignty over ancestral territories. These movements often mobilize around issues such as land rights, resource extraction, and environmental protection, employing a variety of tactics, including protests, legal challenges, direct actions, and advocacy campaigns to assert indigenous control over natural resources and resist exploitative practices.

The Dakota Access Pipeline resistance, also known as the Standing Rock movement, emerged as a significant indigenous-led protest against the construction of the Dakota Access Pipeline in the United States. The pipeline, proposed by Energy Transfer Partners, was intended to transport crude oil from North Dakota to Illinois, traversing ancestral lands and sacred sites of the Standing Rock Sioux Tribe, as well as posing potential threats to water sources, including the Missouri River, which serves as a vital water supply for the tribe and millions of others downstream. The resistance movement, which began in 2016, brought together indigenous activists, environmentalists, and allies from across the country and around the world in a unified effort to oppose the pipeline's construction.

Nick Estes, a scholar of American Indian studies who has followed the Dakota Access Pipeline protests closely, points out that the tactics being used in protest of the Dakota Access Pipeline have been used for generations. In his piece “Our History is The Future” he writes, “Our history and long traditions of Indigenous resistance provide possibilities for futures premised on justice. After all, Indigenous resistance is animated by our ancestors' refusal to be forgotten, and it is our resolute refusal to forget our ancestors and our history that animates our visions for liberation.

The Dakota Access Pipeline resistance garnered widespread attention and support, drawing thousands of people to the Standing Rock Sioux Reservation in North Dakota to stand in solidarity with the Standing Rock Sioux Tribe and protect their lands and water. Among the supporters was activist and performing artist Dallas Goldtooth of the Dakota tribe. Goldtooth highlighted the importance of social media in modern protests, saying, “social media allowed immediate direct one-on-one access and kind of this perception of unfiltered access – unfiltered access to what was happening on the ground."

The movement was characterized by nonviolent protests, prayer ceremonies, and acts of civil disobedience, as well as legal challenges aimed at halting the pipeline's construction and holding the government and energy companies accountable for violating indigenous rights and environmental regulations. The resistance movement also sparked a broader conversation about indigenous sovereignty, environmental justice, and the impacts of fossil fuel infrastructure on indigenous communities and the environment.

== Exploitation of Tibetan resources ==
China’s accelerated development of clean energy depends significantly on extracting critical minerals like lithium and copper and constructing large hydropower projects in Tibet. These efforts brought environmental challenges such as disruption to fragile ecosystems, increased seismic risks from dam construction, and the exacerbation of climate change effects in this sensitive area. Local Tibetan communities have raised concerns about the environmental impact and limited involvement in decision-making processes, alongside reports of restrictions on public expression related to these developments.

A 2023 report by Gabriel Lafitte titled as " Tibet: A New Frontline of the 'White Gold Rush' in the Global Race for Renewable Energy," highlighted Tibet’s growing role as a key source of lithium and copper for China’s clean energy industry, with major manufacturers like Tesla relying on these minerals. Significant lithium deposits are found in Nyagchu County, Sichuan, and two large lithium plants began operation in Nagormo, Qinghai, producing 40,000 and 20,000 tonnes annually. Copper mining is also expanding, with the Julong Mine aiming to become China’s largest standalone copper mine and the Yulong Mine increasing capacity to 30 million tonnes, both operating at high altitudes with environmental challenges.

== Criticism ==
Economist Julian Simon thinks that natural resources are not constrained by a fixed limit of availability, and instead argues that the notion of "finite" is a flawed framework for understanding the characteristics of natural resources. Notably, the provision of services from copper cannot be regarded as quantifiably finite, due to the lack of empirical methods for accurately measuring its utilization. Furthermore, it is essential to consider the potential for optimizing copper utilization, exploring the possibility of substituting copper with economically equivalent materials, implementing copper recycling strategies, and potentially even sourcing copper from extraterrestrial sources. Similarly, the field of ceramics engineering has undergone a significant paradigm shift, thereby rendering concerns about the scarcity of metallic resources previously voiced by earlier generations increasingly obsolete. Additionally, researchers have made groundbreaking discoveries, including the transformation of agricultural products, such as potatoes and corn, into a type of plastic. In light of these developments, he concludes that the notion of scarcity and potential exhaustion of commodity resources appears increasingly tenuous.

== See also ==
- International Day for Preventing the Exploitation of the Environment in War and Armed Conflict
- List of environmental issues
- Agents of deterioration
- Biodiversity loss
- Deforestation
- Ecocide
- Environmental protection
- Habitat destruction
- Human impact on the environment
- Land degradation
- Nature-based solutions
- Over-consumption
- Overexploitation
- Resource curse
- Resource depletion
- Spaceship Earth
- Sustainability
