= Atrocity crimes during the Russo-Ukrainian war =

Atrocity crimes have been committed during the Russo-Ukrainian war, chiefly by the Russian Federation and its proxy forces in Ukraine's Donbas region.

Atrocity crimes is a legally defined group of offences against international law, that includes war crimes, crimes against humanity, and genocide, and is often considered to include the non-legally defined ethnic cleansing. Since the 2014 Russian invasion and annexation of Crimea, the war in Donbas, and the 2022 Russian invasion of Ukraine, numerous atrocity crimes have been identified, and some are being or have been tried in courts.

== Examples of atrocity crimes ==
=== War crimes and crimes against humanity ===
- Bucha massacre
- Humanitarian situation during the war in Donbas
- Russian war crimes § Ukraine
- Sexual violence in the Russian invasion of Ukraine
- Prisoners of war in the Russian invasion of Ukraine
- Torture and castration of a Ukrainian POW in Pryvillia
- Human rights in Ukraine § Torture and conditions in detention
- Ukrainian culture during the Russian invasion of Ukraine
- War crimes in the Russian invasion of Ukraine

=== Genocide ===
- Allegations of genocide of Ukrainians in the Russo-Ukrainian war
- Child abductions in the Russo-Ukrainian War

=== Other ===
- Allegations of genocide in Donbas
