= Preventive diplomacy =

Action to prevent disputes and escalations between parties

Preventive diplomacy is action to prevent disputes from arising between parties, to prevent existing disputes from escalating into conflicts and to limit the spread of the latter when they occur.

Since the end of the Cold War the international community through international institutions has been focusing on preventive diplomacy. As the United Nations and regional organizations as well as global and regional powers discovered the high costs of managing conflict, there is a strong common perception of benevolence of preventive diplomacy. Preventive diplomacy actions can be implemented by the UN, regional organizations, NGO networks and individual states. One of the examples of preventive diplomacy is the UN peacekeeping mission in Macedonia (UNPREDEP) in 1995–1999. It was the first UN preventive action.

Preventive measures include: conflict early warning, fact-finding by UN missions or other bodies, confidence-building measures, early deployment, humanitarian assistance, and demilitarized zones.

== See also ==
- De-escalation
- Diplomacy
- International Day for Preventing the Exploitation of the Environment in War and Armed Conflict
- Preventive action
- United Nations Office for West Africa and the Sahel

== Sources ==
- UN Secretary General Report "Agenda for Peace", 1992
- UN Secretary General Report "Prevention of Armed Conflict", 2001
- "Preventive Diplomacy/Conflict Prevention", Conflict Research Consortium, University of Colorado, US
- Strengthening Preventive Diplomacy and Mediation: Istanbul Retreat of the UN Security Council, 2012
