= International Alert =

International non-governmental organization

Coordinates: 51.46893°N 0.12686°W

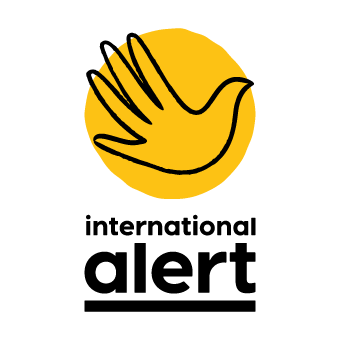
- Formation: 1986
- Type: International NGO
- Purpose: Humanitarian, activism, peacekeeping
- Headquarters: Oval, London
- Location: Worldwide
- Executive Director: Nic Hailey
- Chairman: David Nussbaum
- Key people: Martin Ennals First Secretary General
- Main organ: Board of Trustees
- Revenue: £17.6 Million
- Staff: Approx 300
- Volunteers: 23,000
- Website: www.international-alert.org

International Alert is a global peacebuilding charity established in 1986. It aims to promote dialogue, training, research, policy analysis, advocacy, and outreach activities. The organization addresses the root causes of conflict by working with over 800 partner organizations on projects that advance conflict resolution and support human rights. International Alert operates in Europe, Africa, Asia, the Middle East, Colombia, the Caucasus, and Ukraine.

International Alert GB is headquartered in Oval, in the London Borough of Lambeth, with another office in The Hague, Europe. In the 2019/20 financial year, International Alert GB had a total income of £17.6 million. During this period, the organization employed 300 people across nineteen countries and utilized the services of 23,000 volunteers.

Michael Young served as the chief executive officer from September 2019 until February 2021, when Nic Hailey succeeded him as executive director.

The chairperson of Alert's board of trustees is David Nussbaum, former CEO of The Elders, WWF-UK, and Transparency International.

== History ==
International Alert is said to be the daughter of Amnesty International, one of the first non-governmental organizations created with a specific focus on conflicts and their resolution. It involves the same combination of elites as founding members, drawn from the political, legal, and academic fields, and similar areas of expertise (fact-finding missions and reporting). It combines operational engagement with policy research. Alert's distinctive identity reflected its desire to provide a link between research and practice in dealing with armed conflicts on the one hand and human rights, humanitarianism, and development on the other.

In 1985, the Standing International Forum on Ethnic Conflict, Development, and Human Rights (SIFEC) was founded with the purpose of addressing the issue of conflict and alerts to governments across the world about developing crises. The following year, SIFEC merged with the US organization International Alert on Genocide and Massacres to become International Alert (IA). The organization was founded in 1986 by Leo Kuper, Michael Young, Martin Ennals, and Luis Kutner in response to growing concerns in the international development and human rights community that internal conflicts were impeding the ability to protect and provide for civilian populations, and that there was no effective international mechanism to address this situation. International Alert undertook to advance research on the causes of such conflict and to promote all means of conciliation and resolution, becoming an early advocate of multi-track diplomacy. From its first days, the conflict in Sri Lanka was a particular focus. Dutch jurist Theo Van Boven was its first chairman; Nobel Peace Prize Laureate Archbishop Desmond Tutu, the former Archbishop of Cape Town served as vice chairman of its board of trustees, along with Mexican sociologist Rodolfo Stavenhagen.

== Leadership ==
Martin Ennals, the former secretary general of Amnesty International and founder of Article 19, served as secretary general of the new organization. From 1986 to 1989, Ennals was International Alert's only full-time staff member. He was joined by Andy Carl (later the founder of Conciliation Resources, who managed IA from 1992 to 1993 following Ennals' death. Alert expanded rapidly in 1994–1998 under the leadership of Sri Lankan Kumar Rupesinghe, growing to over 50 staff members with major programs in Sri Lanka, Burundi, and Sierra Leone. Australian Kevin P. Clements served as general secretary from 1998 to 2002. By 1998 Alert had a budget of approximately £5 million and 80 staff, managing programs in over 15 countries in conflict.

Dan Smith, now secretary general of the Stockholm International Peace Research Institute served as secretary general from 2002 to 2015. From 2015 to 2019, Harriet Lamb, CEO of the United Kingdom Fairtrade Foundation for over a decade. became International Alert's CEO. Michael Young, formerly with the International Rescue Committee and Mercy Corps led the organization for the year following Lamb's departure.

In September 2021, former British diplomat Nic Hailey became the executive director of International Alert. In addition to serving in London as Africa director and in the Foreign Secretary's Office, Hailey had diplomatic postings to Washington, D.C., Paris, Berlin, and Kabul, and served as British high commissioner to Kenya. His final government position was director general - transformation, leading the merger of the Foreign and Commonwealth Office and the Department for International Development.

== Board members ==
International Alert's board of trustees is composed of the following members: David Nussbaum (chair), Lisa L. Rose (vice-chair), Richard Langstaff (honorary treasurer), Emine Bozkurt, Nina Fallentin Caspersen, Abir Haj Ibrahim, Njeri Kabeberi and Erin Segilia-Chase. David Nussbaum became board chair in 2023.

== Notable initiatives ==
=== Data mining for conflict prevention ===
International Alert was an early advocate for the development of conflict early warning systems. Its work on gender and peacebuilding was important in establishing the necessity of incorporating gender relations and female stakeholders in conflict early warning systems.

By the early 1990s, International Alert was using the HURIDOCS database in conjunction with early Internet conferencing systems, to enable it to keep abreast of and interact with "local and international nongovernmental organizations and international experts." Through the mid-1990s, by applying a combination of manual and automated analysis in conjunction with such systems, researchers collaborating with International Alert performed early data mining research, demonstrating the viability of this approach for predicting conflict outcomes and encouraging the development of a website for the African Union's Continental Early Warning System (CEWS).

=== Millennium Peace Prize for Women ===
In 2001, as part of International Alert's Women Building Peace campaign, the organization collaborated with the United Nations Development Fund for Women and awarded a Millennium Peace Prize for Women.
