= International Day for Preventing the Exploitation of the Environment in War and Armed Conflict =

United Nations commemorative day

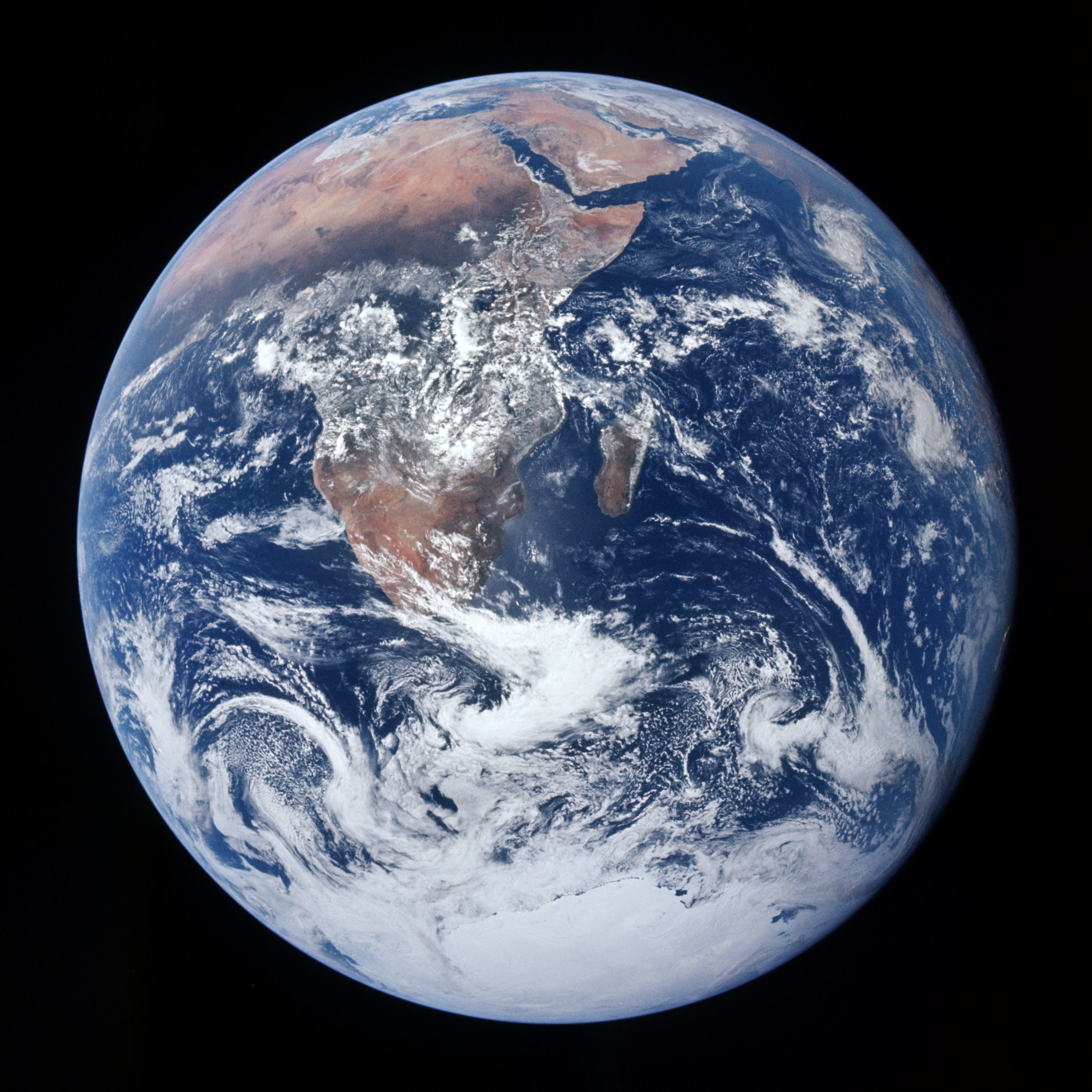
- Observed by: UN Members
- Begins: 2001
- Date: 6 November
- Next time: 6 November 2025
- Frequency: annual

The International Day for Preventing the Exploitation of the Environment in War and Armed Conflict is an international day observed annually on November 6. The International Day for Preventing the Exploitation of the Environment in War and Armed Conflict was established on November 5, 2001, by the United Nations General Assembly, during Kofi Atta Annan's tenure as secretary-general.

Of this observance Secretary-General Ban Ki-moon has since written, "We must use all of the tools at our disposal, from dialogue and mediation to preventive diplomacy, to keep the unsustainable exploitation of natural resources from fueling and financing armed conflict and destabilizing the fragile foundations of peace."
