= Harriet Lamb =

British activist (born 1961)

Harriet Lamb CBE
- Born: 3 June 1961 (age 65); England
- Occupation: Activist
- Known for: CEO of the Green Party of England and Wales

Harriet Lamb CBE (born 3 June 1961) is the CEO of the Green Party of England and Wales, a role she has held since May 2025. Lamb was previously the CEO of WRAP – a Climate Action NGO from March 2023. She was formerly the CEO of Ashden and of the peacebuilding organisation International Alert. From 2001 to 2012 she was executive director of the United Kingdom Fairtrade Foundation. Prior to this, she was a leading campaigner for fair trade. In September 2012, she became chief executive officer of the global standards, certification and producer development organisation, Fairtrade International.

== Background ==
Lamb was born in England, lived in India as a child and then grew up and was educated in the UK, taking a first degree in political science at Cambridge University and an MPhil at the Sussex Institute of Development Studies.

She has lived for more than six years in India, including time working with poor landless labourers and with a cooperative of low-caste "untouchable" farmers selling grapes.

== Fairtrade global agenda ==
She joined the Fairtrade Foundation after two years with Fairtrade Labelling Organizations International (FLO), the Fairtrade umbrella body with responsibility for Fairtrade standards globally, in Bonn, Germany. Under her leadership, Fairtrade has become one of Britain's most active grassroots social movements. In 2008, sales of Fairtrade topped £700 million, with over 4,500 Fairtrade products available from cotton to coffee, face-cream to ice-cream. Lamb first heard about climate change from Fairtrade farmers who were having to deal with the devastating effects of climate change patterns.

She had become convinced of the importance of Fairtrade while Head of Campaigns at the World Development Movement (WDM). While visiting Costa Rica with WDM in 1997 to investigate local banana plantations' use of the pesticide dibromochloropropane (DBCP), already banned in the US for making farm-workers sterile, she met a woman called Maria whose husband had been exposed to DBCP while working on the plantations. The couple had had a baby boy born with severe developmental abnormalities who died after a short and distressful life.

In her book Fighting The Banana Wars, Lamb describes how "As we sat there and she showed me pictures of her baby, rage bubbled up inside me because the companies knew of the dangers of this chemical but they ignored them. I have never, ever forgotten Maria."

Previous campaigning activities include the UK Minimum Wage Campaign at the Low Pay Unit and for refugee rights. She has lived and travelled widely in the developing world. She was appointed a CBE in the 2006 UK New Year's Honours List for her contribution to Fairtrade. Other accolades include Cosmopolitan Eco-Queen 2008 and Orange Businesswoman of the Year 2008.

== Personal life ==
A keen cyclist, she lives in South London.

On Friday 14 January 2011, Lamb appeared for the first time on the BBC Radio 4 programme Any Questions?, alongside Tim Montgomerie, Emily Thornberry MP and Sarah Teather MP.

== Books ==
- From Anger to Action: Inside the Global Movements for Social Justice, Peace and a Sustainable Planet Harriet Lamb & Ben Jackson, Rowman and Littlefield, June 2021
- Fighting The Banana Wars and other Fairtrade Battles. Rider Books, 2008. ISBN 978-1-84604-083-2
