= Armed Conflict Location and Event Data =

American non-governmental organization

Armed Conflict Location & Event Data (abbreviated ACLED) is a non-profit organization registered in the United States that specializes in the real-time collection, analysis, and mapping of data on political violence and protest events around the world. It was founded in 2005 as a research initiative by political scientist Clionadh Raleigh. The organization codes information on events such as armed clashes, demonstrations, riots, and strategic developments, including the date, location, actors, fatalities, and event type. As of 2022, the dataset includes more than 1.3 million recorded events and offers updates through a global team of researchers and local partners.

The organization maintains partnerships with academic institutions, governments, international organizations, and humanitarian agencies. Its data and analysis are used by journalists, policymakers, researchers, and civil society to monitor conflict trends, support early warning systems, and inform decision-making in conflict-affected contexts. In 2022, the project expanded its coverage from a regional focus in Africa to a global scope.

== Team and history ==
Since 2014, ACLED has operated as a 501(c)(3) non-profit organization registered in the United States. Data are collected and analyzed by teams of researchers based around the world. ACLED is led by founder and CEO Clionadh Raleigh, a Professor of political violence and geography at the University of Sussex.

In 2005, ACLED began as a component of Raleigh's PhD work, with a focus on African states. She developed the idea while on a fellowship at the Peace Research Institute Oslo (PRIO). Initial data collection covered six Central African states and three West African states. In 2008, while Raleigh was employed at Trinity College Dublin, ACLED expanded to cover the 50 least developed countries. This led to a pilot version of the data in 2009, which was tested with ground-truthing methods in 2010. The dataset was introduced by Raleigh and co-authors in a 2010 paper in the Journal of Peace Research. Subsequently, Version 2 was released in 2011, Version 3 in 2012, and Version 4 in 2013.

New additions – including remote violence and revised terminology – were added in Versions 5, 6, and 7. Version 8 expanded to include 14 states in South and Southeast Asia as well as 15 in the Middle East. This release brought the total number of countries covered to 79. Following the release of Version 8, and encouraged by a partnership with the University of Texas at Austin, ACLED transitioned to a dynamic project that collects data in real time and releases updates on a weekly basis.

In 2019, ACLED introduced new event and sub-event types to improve the project's core methodology. By 2020, the project expanded geographic coverage to Europe, Central Asia and the Caucasus, East Asia, Latin America and the Caribbean, and the United States. At least by February 2022, ACLED had data covering the entire world including Antarctica for events since January 2021 with coverage of continental African since January 1997 and with coverage of other places starting between 1997 and 2021.

== Data ==
ACLED codes report information on the type, agents, location, date, and other characteristics of political violence events, demonstrations, and select politically relevant non-violent events. ACLED focuses on tracking a range of violent and non-violent actions by political agents, including governments, rebels, militias, identity groups, political parties, external actors, rioters, protesters, and civilians.

ACLED data are derived from a wide range of local, regional, and national sources and the information is collected by trained data experts worldwide. In addition to traditional media, government reports, and select new media sources, ACLED has a wide-ranging network of local data collection partners on the ground. ACLED currently has over 50 local partners all over the world and integrates data from more than 1,200 non-English sources publishing in more than 100 languages.

The dataset has different coverage periods for different regions and countries, as back-coding remains ongoing: all African countries are covered starting from 1997 to the present; Middle Eastern countries are covered from 2016 to the present, with the exception of Yemen (2015–present), Saudi Arabia (2015–present), and Syria (2017–present); South and Southeast Asian countries are covered from 2010 to the present, with the exception of India (2016–present), Indonesia (2015–present), the Philippines (2016–present), and Malaysia (2018–present); all Eastern European countries are covered from 2018 to the present; all Western European countries are covered from 2020 to the present; all countries in Central Asia & the Caucasus are covered from 2018 to the present, with the exception of Afghanistan (2017–present); all countries in Latin America & the Caribbean are covered from 2018 to the present; all countries in East Asia are covered from 2018 to the present; the United States of America is covered from 2020 to the present; Canada is covered from 2021 to the present; and all countries and territories in Oceania are covered from 2021 to the present. In 2022, ACLED expanded to the entire world with all regions being covered in real time.

A full account of definitions, practices, source, and coding procedures is available in the Knowledge Base section of the ACLED website. Data are updated in real time and can be downloaded from the website's Data Export Tool, the website's Curated Data Files, or directly from the ACLED API. ACLED provides a codebook intended for all users of the dataset as well as additional FAQs and guides.

== Analysis ==
Data-driven analysis of political violence and demonstration trends can be found on the ACLED website, including monthly regional overviews, briefings, reports, and infographics. ACLED has also launched a range of special initiatives to broaden the scope and depth of coverage by spotlighting key conflicts and providing the public with new tools to better analyze the data.

=== Special projects ===
ACLED regularly establishes new special projects to improve and deepen existing coverage of political violence and disorder around the world.

In 2021, ACLED launched the Ethiopia Peace Observatory (EPO), a conflict observatory to enhance local data collection and analysis on political violence and protest trends across Ethiopia. The EPO produced a regular bulletin of conflict news in Amharic and English, weekly updates on all active conflicts, monthly analysis of major developments, special reports on emerging trends and thematic issues, as well as actor profiles, conflict profiles, and summaries of political violence dynamics across Ethiopia's different regions.

The Early Warning Research Hub provides a suite of interactive resources aimed at supporting data-driven initiatives to anticipate and respond to emerging crises. These tools include the Subnational Threat & Surge Trackers to track and map subnational conflict spikes; the Volatility & Risk Predictability Index to track the frequency and intensity of conflict surges; the Conflict Change Map to identify countries at risk of rising political violence; and the Emerging Actor Tracker to monitor the proliferation of new non-state actors.

When Russia launched a full-scale invasion of Ukraine in early 2022, ACLED created a dedicated research hub on the Ukraine Crisis to provide near real-time information on the conflict, including a curated data file, interactive data visualization tools, and weekly analysis of violence patterns in Ukraine, Russia, and the broader region.

Additionally, in 2022, ACLED launched the Yemen Truce Monitor tool to support analysis of conflict trends during the UN-sponsored truce and allow users to track violations as they are reported. The interactive tool is updated weekly with the latest data on reported violations.

Research produced by past special projects are also still available on ACLED's website, including ACLED-Religion and the COVID-19 Disorder Tracker. ACLED-Religion was a pilot project collecting real-time data on religious repression and disorder. Building off ACLED's core methodology, ACLED-Religion introduced new event types to capture religion-related violence and harassment while adding further information about religious dynamics and actors to existing ACLED data. The pilot project covered seven countries in the Middle East and North Africa: Bahrain, Egypt, Iran, Iraq, Israel, Palestine, and Yemen.

The COVID-19 Disorder Tracker (CDT) provided special coverage of the pandemic's impact on political violence and protest trends around the world, monitoring changes in demonstration activity, state repression, mob attacks, overall rates of armed conflict, and more.

== Uses and users of ACLED ==
=== Policy makers ===
ACLED data are routinely used and referenced by development practitioners, humanitarian agencies, and policy makers, including several United Nations offices and affiliates.

ACLED data on political violence targeting women (PVTW) fueled a global conversation on violence against women in politics and ultimately contributed to the adoption of UN Security Council Resolution 2493. In June 2019, UN Secretary-General Antonio Guterres personally commented that he was "shocked" by the prevalence of PVTW, indicating that the new ACLED data had expanded his understanding of the situation and reinforced his policy position to "protect and promote women's participation in political life." In October 2019, the Secretary-General's official report to the Security Council on Women, Peace, and Security laid out the UN's priorities concerning the implementation of UNSC resolutions 1325 (2000) and 2122 (2013) on Women, Peace, and Security, explicitly citing ACLED's new data to underscore the goal of "protecting and promoting the human rights of women and girls, in conflict settings and humanitarian emergencies."

The UN Office for the Coordination of Humanitarian Affairs (OCHA) has employed ACLED data and analysis in its Calls for Action urging better-coordinated response from humanitarian actors and increased support from funders to close resource gaps. ACLED data are also regularly used in OCHA monitoring of humanitarian and security developments in places like in the Sahel, Mozambique, Burkina Faso, the Lake Chad Basin, and Nigeria.

Other UN entities utilizing ACLED data include: UN Peacekeeping, UN Women, the Food and Agriculture Organization of the United Nations (FAO), the United Nations High Commissioner for Refugees (UNHCR), and the UN Special Rapporteur on the Situation of Human Rights in Myanmar, among others.

ACLED provides the fields of peacebuilding, development, and humanitarian aid with data that reflects local conflict and insecurity trends. This has enabled organizations like the World Bank, NATO, the International Monetary Fund, and the World Health Organization, among others to respond to crises with objective, unbiased data on political violence and disorder in near real time.

Many governments and government entities use ACLED data extensively for domestic and foreign policy decisions, including in the United States, the United Kingdom, Canada, nearly every European country, Australia, and New Zealand.

The European Union (EU) uses ACLED data to track trends in global disorder and to better understand the impact of emerging crises around the world. The European Commission's Joint Research Centre (JRC) and Service for Foreign Policy Instruments (FPI), as well as the European External Action Service (EEAS), rely on the Global Conflict Risk Index (GCRI) and their monthly reports, which draws on ACLED data to contribute to situational awareness across the EU.

Also in Europe, the Belgian Government, the Federal Foreign Office for Migration in Germany, the German Parliament, the French Government, the Italian Ministry of Foreign Affairs, the Ministry of Foreign Affairs of the Netherlands, the Central Bank of Ireland, and the United Kingdom Home Office all frequently engage with ACLED data to inform domestic and foreign policymaking. For example, the Belgian and French governments use ACLED data to support the production of country of origin reports for asylum seekers and refugees.

In North America, the Government of Canada, the Canadian Ministry of Foreign Affairs, the Immigration and Refugee Board of Canada, and the Peace and Stabilization Operations Program in Canada make use of ACLED data. The US Government extensively uses ACLED's data for a wide range of policy initiatives and decision-making at both federal and state levels. For example, the US Mission to Ethiopia recently reported that ACLED data are important for making decisions about intra-country travel, while the US Congress frequently uses the dataset to support policy initiatives related to the war in Yemen. The Department of Homeland Security's Fusion Center and the Federal Bureau of Investigation (FBI) have utilized ACLED data on far-right violence in the United States. ACLED research has also been shared by former President Barack Obama.

Additional government entities and policymakers that make use of ACLED data include the African Union, the Ministry of Finance of Japan, the Australian Department of Defense, the Ghanaian Armed Forces, and country embassies in Mozambique, Somalia, Indonesia, Senegal, and Kenya, among others.

=== NGOs ===
International and local NGOs such as Action on Armed Violence, Amnesty International, Center for Social Change, Center for Civilians in Conflict, Darfur Women Action, Deep South Watch, European Asylum Support Office, Genocide Watch, Global Centre for the Responsibility to Protect, Mercy Corps, International Committee of the Red Cross (ICRC), International Justice Mission, International Rescue Committee, International Women's Peace Group, Sahel Watch, Save the Children, UNICEF, United Against Inhumanity, World Food Programme and many others use ACLED data and analysis to design data-driven programming that better responds to the needs of their beneficiaries and make more granular assessments based on specific local contexts. The ICRC uses ACLED data for humanitarian analysis and data mapping in their areas of operation. Mercy Corps has drawn on ACLED data to identify "aid deserts" where the high level of conflict prevents aid workers from reaching certain areas, as well as to track potential security threats to their humanitarian operations. Peacebuilding organizations such as Search for Common Ground employ the data as an indicator for their Global Impact Framework.

=== Academics and think tanks ===
Scholars, students, and academic researchers frequently make use of ACLED data and analysis in their work on protest and political violence.

The Council on Foreign Relations draws on ACLED data for their Sub-Saharan Africa Security Tracker. The Sub-Saharan Security Tracker (SST) uses over three million data points to map the state of political violence, and deaths caused by such violence, in the region, including geographic distribution, trends over time, and actors involved.

=== News media ===
ACLED data and analysis are regularly cited in media reports on conflict and protest trends. The data are used by a wide range of major international, national, and local outlets all around the world. (Note: Attributed to multiple sources:) In 2019, The Mail & Guardian listed ACLED as "the most comprehensive database of conflict incidents around the world."

=== Blogs ===
Political scientist, data analyst, and forecaster Jay Ulfelder blogged about his experience trying to use the ACLED to see if it added predictive power in estimating the probability of coups, and explained both how he approached the problem and why he eventually concluded that the ACLED data did not add predictive power for coup forecasting. However, 23 successful and unsuccessful changes in power through coups have occurred across Africa since 1997. Recent research suggests that coup risk is related to the size and stability of a leader's cabinet, and not episodes of political violence preceding coups. A post by Thomas Zeitzoff at the Political Violence at a Glance blog listed the ACLED as one of several "high-profile datasets." Patrick Meier blogged about it at irevolution.net.

== See also ==
- Casualty recording
- Uppsala Conflict Data Program (UCDP), a program closely cooperating with the Peace Research Institute Oslo (PRIO)
- EM-DAT
- Global Database of Events, Language, and Tone
- Global Terrorism Database
- Heidelberg Institute for International Conflict Research
