= Integrated Crisis Early Warning System =

The Integrated Crisis Early Warning System (ICEWS) combines a database of political events and a system using these to provide conflict early warnings. It is supported by the Defense Advanced Research Projects Agency in the United States. The database as well as the model used by Lockheed Martin Advanced Technology Laboratories are currently undergoing operational test and evaluation by the United States Southern Command and United States Pacific Command.

== History ==
ICEWS was a DARPA program conceived and led by Dr. Sean P. O'Brien that launched in 2008. In March 2010, O'Brien authored an article that compared ICEWS with past efforts in the realm, including systems designed by Bruce Bueno de Mesquita. According to the paper, the first of three phases of the ICEWS involved a competition between different groups to successfully predict events of interest based on historical data. The winning team, Lockheed Martin Advanced Technology Laboratories, combined six different conflict modeling systems, including agent-based models such as Barry Silverman's Factionalism and Ian Lustick's Political Science-Identity (PSI) computational modeling platforms, logistic regression models such as those developed by Philip A. Schrodt and the Bayesian statistics model used by Steve Shellman, and geo-spatial network models built by Michael D. Ward.

The ICEWS data and model are currently maintained by Lockheed Martin and undergoing operational test and evaluation by the United States Southern Command and United States Pacific Command.

== Reception ==
=== Academic reception ===
ICEWS has been discussed in papers on conflict prediction as well as papers on the coding of political events. There has also been some research comparing ICEWS with the Global Database of Events, Language, and Tone.

=== Reception in blogs ===
ICEWS has been discussed extensively in blogs related to geopolitical forecasting as well as crisis prediction. Among the topics discussed have been the utility of access to ICEWS data in improving the quality of predictions made in The Good Judgment Project and its similarities and differences with the Global Database of Events, Language, and Tone (GDELT).
