= GDELT Project =

Global database of events

The GDELT Project, or Global Database of Events, Language, and Tone, created by Kalev Leetaru of Yahoo! and Georgetown University, along with Philip Schrodt and others, describes itself as "an initiative to construct a catalog of human societal-scale behavior and beliefs across all countries of the world, connecting every person, organization, location, count, theme, news source, and event across the planet into a single massive network that captures what's happening around the world, what its context is and who's involved, and how the world is feeling about it, every single day." Early explorations leading up to the creation of GDELT were described by co-creator Philip Schrodt in a conference paper in January 2011. The dataset is available on Google Cloud Platform.

== Data ==
GDELT includes data from 1979 to the present. The data is available as zip files in tab-separated value format using a CSV extension for easy import into Microsoft Excel or similar spreadsheet software. Data from 1979 to 2005 is available in the form of one zip file per year, with the file size gradually increased from 14.3 MB in 1979 to 125.9 MB in 2005, reflecting the increase in the number of news media and the frequency and comprehensiveness of event recording. Data files from January 2006 to March 2013 are available at monthly granularity, with the zipped file size rising from 11 MB in January 2006 to 103.2 MB in March 2013. Data files from April 1, 2013 onward are available at a daily granularity. The data file for each date is made available by 6 AM Eastern Standard Time the next day. As of June 2014, the size of the daily zipped file is about 5-12 MB. The data files use Conflict and Mediation Event Observations (CAMEO) coding for recording events.

In a blog post for Foreign Policy, co-creator Kalev Leetaru attempted to use GDELT data to answer the question of whether the Arab Spring sparked protests worldwide, using the quotient of the number of protest-related events to the total number of events recorded as a measure of protest intensity for which the time trend was then studied. Political scientist and data science/forecasting expert Jay Ulfelder critiqued the post on his personal blog, saying that Leetaru's normalization method may not have adequately accounted for the change in the nature and composition of media coverage.

The dataset is also available on Google Cloud Platform and can be accessed using Google BigQuery.

== Reception ==
=== Academic reception ===
Researchers have adopted GDELT for scholarly inquiries such as:

1. Media Analytics & Financial Prediction: A study on Visual and Predictive Analytics of Singapore News used GDELT alongside Wikipedia and Singapore’s Straits Times Index to assess data completeness, extract event terms, and predict stock market movements via decision-tree models.
2. Global Conflict & Disaster Coverage: Scholars have used GDELT’s dataset to explore determinants of media attention to disasters through hierarchical regression, uncovering patterns like regional bias in news coverage.
3. Image Content Analysis: Researchers have applied deep-learning vision APIs to analyze millions of news images, examining object frequency, sentiment alignment with text, and visual representation of political figures.
4. Behavioral Modeling Challenges: Participants of Social Computing, Behavioral‑Cultural Modeling and Prediction (SBP) 2014 used GDELT as the core dataset for a Grand Data Challenge, using spatial, temporal, and network analysis to model human behavior, identify social influencers, and forecast societal events.

=== Reception in blogs and media ===
GDELT has been covered on the website of the Center for Data Innovation as well as the GIS Lounge. It has also been discussed and critiqued on blogs about political violence and crisis prediction. The dataset has been cited and critiqued repeatedly in Foreign Policy, including in discussions of political events in Syria, the Arab Spring, and Nigeria. It has also been cited in New Scientist, on the FiveThirtyEight website and Andrew Sullivan's blog.

The Predictive Heuristics blog and other blogs have compared GDELT with the Integrated Conflict Early Warning System (ICEWS). Alex Hanna blogged about her experiment assessing GDELT with hand-coded data by comparing it with the Dynamics of Collective Action dataset.

In May 2014, the Google Cloud Platform blog announced that the entire GDELT dataset would be available as a public dataset in Google BigQuery.

== See also ==
- United Nations Global Pulse
- Integrated Crisis Early Warning System
- Armed Conflict Location and Event Data
