= West Africa Network for Peacebuilding =

West Africa Network for Peacebuilding (WANEP) is the largest regional peacebuilding group in West Africa. The network aims to support conflict resolution, mediation, and human rights. Founded in 1998 by Samuel Gbaydee Doe and Emmanuel Bombande, the organization rose as a response to civil wars and inter-ethnic conflicts in Liberia, Ghana, and other West African countries. As of 2014, WANEP had over 500 member organizations spread across the 15 countries represented by ECOWAS.

== History and founders ==
WANEP was founded by Samuel Gbaydee Doe and Emmanuel Habuka Bombande. Based on Sam Doe's background in working with trauma during the Second Liberian Civil War, and in establishing youth dialogue organizations and Bombande's efforts with Hizkias Assefa at the Nairobi Peace Initiative in resolving the Kokomba-Nanumba conflict in northern Ghana, WANEP focused on both lessening existing conflicts and preventing future outbreaks. By directing efforts toward grassroots efforts the organization helped local leaders and citizens resolve conflicts without outside intervention.

== Leadership ==
Samuel Gbaydee Doe served as the executive director of WANEP from its formation in 1998 until 2004. In 2004, then director of programs, Emmanuel Bombande was appointed executive director. In 2015, Chukwuemeka Eze, formerly the program director, took over from Bombande as the executive director while Levinia Addae-Mensah is the deputy executive director and program director.

Leymah Roberta Gbowee was Liberian Programme Coordinator for Women in Peacebuilding at WANEP from December 2001 to December 2005. Under a leadership dispute with the all-male leadership of WANEP, Gbowee left WIPNET in 2006. She co-founded a separate organization, Women in Peacebuilding and Security Network (WIPSEN), with Thelma Ekiyor and Ecoma Alaga.

== Programs and organizations ==
One of the more prominent programs of WANEP was the Women in Peacebuilding Network (WIPNET). An early predecessor to WIPNET was independently formed in the early 1990s to protest the 1st Liberian Civil War leading public marches and attending the peace talks. It was reformed under WANEP in 2002 under the leadership of future Nobel Peace Prize Laureate Leymah Gbowee to help organize the women of Liberia in mass, non-violent protests and other actions against the civil war. It is credited with urging Charles Taylor's government and the Liberians for Reconciliation and Democracy (LURD) into a ceasefire and leading to the end of the conflict.

== Activities ==
President Ellen Johnson Sirleaf cited WIPNET as one of the key factors supporting women's prominent role in peace building in Liberia. In 2015, WANEP signed an MOU with the African Union Commission to provide support to the Commission's Peace and Security Department in the implementation of the AU Peace and Security Architecture (APSA) including the gender mainstreaming of the architecture.

The work of WANEP in establishing an early warning system was seen as instrumental in helping to resolve multiple conflicts in early stages. In 2014 this effort was officially recognized by Cote d'Ivoire's permanent representative to the United Nations Youssoufou Bamba in his official remarks at the Informal interactive Dialogue on the Responsibility to Protect: "Fulfilling our collective responsibility: International assistance and the responsibility to protect", September 8, 2014.

WANEP's experience in peacebuilding has been sought for replication in East and Central Africa. The structure of WANEP contributed to WANEP's choice as the civil society implementing partner for the operationalization of ECOWAS Early Warning Mechanism (ECOWARN).

The Ivorian section of the West Africa Network for Peacebuilding, WANEP-CI set up an independent early warning system, in particular through the dissemination of monthly reports of the collection of information, relating to human security and aims to support actions to prevent conflicts and promote peace in Côte d'Ivoire.

In September 2013 WANEP was recognized for its work with ECOWAS to promote peace education in selected secondary schools across the region. These educational programs aimed to impart new ways of thinking and new ways of viewing conflict, thereby leading to building new structures and cultural practices in the society to enable peaceful coexistence.

== Affiliations ==
The organization works with several regional partners including the Economic Community of West African States, the African Union’s Economic, Social, and Cultural Council ECOSOCC, and the United Nations Economic and Social Council (ECOSOC). WANEP is also a member of the Peace and Security cluster of ECOSOCC representing West Africa, and is the West Africa Regional Representative of the Global Partnership for the Prevention of Armed Conflict (GPPAC) and the Focal Point for Africa CSOs on the AU-EU Joint Strategy (JAES).

== Partnerships ==
In 2002, WANEP entered into a historic partnership with the Economic Community of West African States (ECOWAS) in the implementation of a regional early warning and response system referred to as ECOWARN. In 2004, WANEP and ECOWAS signed a Memorandum of Understanding (MOU) which has consistently been renewed. This inter-governmental structure acts as a regional early warning and response system. WANEP and ECOWAS partnership enables typically non-governmental organizations a path to Track 1 diplomacy efforts early on in conflicts.

WANEP worked in collaboration with the United States Agency for International Development (USAID) to implement a five-year project (2015 to 2019) called "Mitigating Election Violence in West Africa through National Early Warning Systems (NEWS)" in target countries in West Africa, namely, Burkina Faso, Cote d'Ivoire, Niger, Ghana, and Sierra Leone. Through this project, WANEP set up and operationalized an election situation room during elections in those countries. WANEP also partnered with other key stakeholders to run similar rooms in countries such as Benin, The Gambia and Nigeria.

WANEP works partnership with the Kofi Annan International Peacekeeping Training Centre (KAIPTC) in Accra, Ghana to run the West Africa Peacebuilding Institute (WAPI).
