= Charles A. McClelland =

American political scientist and systems analyst

Charles Armor McClelland (April 25, 1917 – March 31, 2006) was an American political scientist, systems analyst and Professor International Relations at the San Francisco State University, who was among the first to introduce General Systems Theory in the field of International Relations.

== Biography ==
Born and raised in Oakley, Idaho, McClelland received his BA from San Jose State College, and his MA and PhD in history from the University of California.

In 1940s McClelland joined the faculty of the San Francisco State College, where he became professor of history and international relations at the department of International Relations, and chairman of the division of social science. He was also visiting professor at the University of Michigan, department of Political Science, and joined the faculty as Professor, department of International Relations at the University of Southern California. One of his students at San Francisco State College was James N. Rosenau.

He was president of Society for General Systems Research from 1959 to 1961. In 1967 he received an USC Associates Awards for Letters, Arts and Sciences. In the 1970s McClelland received research grants from the Advanced Research Projects Agency, a research arm of the Pentagon. In 1978–79 he was a Scholar in Residence at the Annenberg School of Communications at the University of Southern California.

== Work ==
With Walter F. Buckley, Morton A. Kaplan, Karl W. Deutsch, Robert A. Dahl and David Easton McClelland was among the first to introduce General Systems Theory in the social sciences. In his 1966 book "Theory and the International System" McClelland introduced the idea to apply general systems ideas in the study of international relations from different perspectives, which led to the definition of different approaches.

In 1969 McClelland postulated the "wisdom approach", an approach that "invites scholars to prudently examine history and appreciate the precarious nature of human conduct, rather than being overwhelmed by masses of data, which more often than not lead to blind spots of partisanship".

== Publications ==
- 1955, Applications of General Systems Theory in International Relations
- 1960, The United Nations: the Continuing Debate. Chandler publishing. 1960
- 1960, Nuclear weapons, missiles, and future war: problem for the sixties.
- 1962, College teaching of international relations; problems of organization and collaboration. A report on applied and experimental studies of undergraduate college education in international relations.
- 1966, Theory and the International System. New York : The Macmillan Company.
- 1970, An Interaction Survey of the Middle East, with Anne Ancoli.
- 1972, International Events Interaction Analysis: Some Research Considerations. With, Edward E. Azar and Richard A. Brody (eds.) Beverly Hills: Sage Publications.

Articles

- 1958, "Systems and History in International Relations". In: General Systems Yearbook 3 (1958), p. 237.
- 1959, "A Classification of International Relations Theory" in: American Behavioral Scientist, Vol. 2, No. 4, 32–34 (1959)
- 1960, "The function of theory in international relations" in: Journal of Conflict Resolution 4 (1960), pp. 303–336.
- 1961, "The Acute International Crisis," in: World Politics, Vol. 14 (October 1961), p. 199.
- 1962, "General Systems and the Social Sciences," in: A Review of General Semantics, 18 (1962), 456.
- 1972, "The Beginning, Duration, and Abatement of International Crises: Comparisons in Two Conflict Arenas", in C. F. Hermann (ed.), International Crises: Insights from Behavioral Research (New York: Free Press, 1972).

Publications about McClelland

- Charles P. Schleicher (1967), "Reviewed work(s): Theory of the International System by Charles A. McClelland", in: The Western Political Quarterly, Vol. 20, No. 1 (Mar., 1967), pp. 232–233
