= Kalev Leetaru =

American internet entrepreneur

Kalev Leetaru

Kalev Hannes Leetaru is an American internet entrepreneur, academic, and senior fellow at the George Washington University School of Engineering and Applied Science Center for Cyber & Homeland Security in Washington, D.C. He was a former Yahoo! Fellow in Residence of International Values, Communications Technology & the Global Internet at the Institute for the Study of Diplomacy in the Edmund A. Walsh School of Foreign Service at Georgetown University, before moving to George Washington University.

== Biography ==
Born to Hannes and Marilyn Leetaru, Leetaru co-founded a web company in 1995 while in middle school. His first product was a web authoring suite. (During this time, websites were still built directly into HTML and content management systems; Javascript, and CSS were not used widely.) In 2000, while an undergraduate at the University of Illinois at Urbana-Champaign, Leetaru joined the National Center for Supercomputing Applications there. Leetaru's undergraduate thesis was a history of the University of Illinois and formed the basis for the University of Illinois Histories Project.

After finishing his undergraduate studies, Leetaru continued working at the National Center for Supercomputing Applications, and held positions at the Institute for Computing in the Humanities, Arts, and Social Sciences and the Graduate School of Library and Information Science at the university. In 2013, he started as a Yahoo! Fellow in Residence at the Institute for the Study of Diplomacy in the Edmund A. Walsh School of Foreign Service at Georgetown University, and in 2014, he was appointed adjunct assistant professor at the university.

Leetaru's research has focused on the use of big data and networks and their utility in prediction, including analyses of Wikipedia, Twitter, and geopolitical events.

Leetaru is best known for his role as the co-creator of the Global Database of Events, Language, and Tone (GDELT) with Philip Schrodt. He currently maintains the database and the underlying code.

== Media coverage ==
Leetaru is a contributor to Foreign Policy, where he discusses current political events worldwide, often drawing from GDELT data for his analyses.

Leetaru's analysis of the relationships between articles on Wikipedia, sponsored by Silicon Graphics International, was covered in The New York Times. He has also been cited in The Wall Street Journal in an article about Twitter usage. He has been cited in The Washington Post in connection with GDELT and as an expert on foreign affairs.
