= Kumar Rupesinghe =

Sri Lankan academic and activist (1943–2022)

Kumar Rupesinghe (1943 – 20 February 2022) was a Sri Lankan academic and activist involved in social issues, particularly human rights, development issues, processes of globalisation, conflict prevention/resolution, and conflict transformation in the light of peacekeeping and peacebuilding for a harmonious coexistence among all peoples in the world.

He was a secretary general of International Alert and an advisor to the Reconciliation programme of the Triple R. Rupesinghe had experience in mediation and conflict resolution work.

== Biography ==
Rupesinghe was born in the British Raj in 1943. He obtained his first degree from the London School of Economics and his Ph.D. from the City University London. He contributed towards building new organizations and networks on human rights and peace.

At sixteen he went to London to study philosophy for eight years. His guide and mentor in those formative years was the Hungarian philosopher Alfred Reynolds (Reinhold Alfré), whose insightful and enlightening discussions on philosophy ensured that the young Rupesinghe earned a solid grounding in Western and Indian Philosophy. This exposure to Western culture at an early age armed him with subjectivity for his own Sri Lankan culture.

In the meantime, he continued his academic growth by obtaining a degree at London School of Economics and a doctorate from City University London. Over time, he became a research fellow at the Agrarian Research and Training Institute in Colombo (1971–1973) and was appointed director of the National Youth Service Council.

One of Rupesinghe's core concerns was the brutality he witnessed during the ethnic riots of 1958 in Sri Lanka, where a close Tamil friend and his family were killed.

== Revolutionary years ==
During 1973–1977, under the patronage of the Sri Lanka Freedom Party, Rupesinghe formed two major weekly newspapers, Janavegaya and Janavegam (both meaning 'people's power'), which embodied a social movement for change. The Janavegaya social movement had wide popularity and a presence throughout the island. One of his unique achievements was to visit the 20,000 political prisoners held as a result of the abortive 1971 JVP Insurrection. Eventually, through the efforts of Janavegaya, the prime minister was persuaded to release all prisoners held in connection to the insurrection except for the key figures of the insurgency.

Through the newspaper Janavegam, a Tamil weekly, he learned of the deep-rooted grievances of Tamil youth. Janavegam agitated for their rights and called for a power sharing arrangement for the Northern and East provinces. One positive outcome of this agitation was the establishment of the University of Jaffna. The weekly newspaper predicted that unless there was a clear policy to alleviate suffering and address the grievances of the youth, civil war would be inevitable.

== University of Peradeniya ==
After the 1977 defeat of the SLFP-led United Front government, Rupesinghe served as a lecturer at the Department of Sociology of the University of Peradeniya (1977-1981). He was also a member of the Social Scientists Association, a Sri Lankan research body.

== International Peace Research Institute ==
Rupesinghe was invited to join the International Peace Research Institute Oslo (PRIO) in Norway, as a research fellow in 1982. At this time ethnic polarisation in Sri Lanka had increased and after 1977, relations between the Tamils and the government had deteriorated. Against this backdrop, he dedicated himself to finding solutions to the ethnic conflict, leading to his advocacy for an early warning system. He was later appointed research director and led PRIO's programme on ethnic conflict and conflict resolution.

During his tenure, Rupesinghe was appointed a coordinator to the Programme on Governance and Conflict Resolution at the United Nations University, Tokyo, where he edited two volumes and commissioned several monographs on identity conflict. He was also chair of the Commission on Internal Conflicts of the International Peace Research Association (IPRA), where he published four volumes on early warning and conflict resolution.

== International Alert ==
From 1992 to 1998 Rupesinghe was secretary general of International Alert (IA), an international non-governmental organisation (NGO) dedicated to the prevention and mitigation of internal conflict. The organisation continued the work of the human rights advocate and first secretary general of Amnesty International, Martin Ennals, who received the Nobel Prize. During his tenure, Rupesinghe was in the august company of IA Board members like Archbishop Desmond Tutu, Nobel Laureates and other distinguished citizens of the global human rights community.

Under his leadership, International Alert became one of the largest NGOs in the world with a budget of approximately UK£5 million a year, a staff of 80, and field programmes in over 15 countries. Many organisations adopted International Alert's mandate of conflict prevention. Rupesinghe collaborated with over 50 organisations mainly in the regions of conflict.

International Alert has been involved in mediation and conflict resolution in Sri Lanka, the Philippines, Fiji, Sierra Leone, Burundi, Rwanda, the Caucasus region, and the Russian Federation. It made a decisive intervention in the conflict in Sierra Leone and facilitated the mediation process with the foreign minister of Côte d'Ivoire, the UN, the OAU, and the Commonwealth secretariat. Their efforts eventually led to the Abidjan Accords. In Liberia, at the request of President Carter, early efforts were made to encourage dialogue between Charles Taylor of Liberia and President Abacha of Nigeria.

In Sri Lanka, International Alert worked towards the resolution of its conflict with many problem-solving workshops inclusive of all parties involved. Of special interest was a programme to take 20 MPs representing each political party to learn from the experience from Northern Ireland, South Africa, and the Philippines.

In the Caucasus, in collaboration with the then Minister of Nationalities, Professor Valery Tishkov, Rupesinghe initiated a programme to expand an early warning and early response network in the Russian Federation and inaugurated a citizen-based network for peace building and conflict resolution. International Alert was asked to intervene in several conflicts in the former Soviet Union, including Chechnya and Dagestan.

In Fiji, International Alert was involved in several workshops with decision makers from both sides to work towards constitutional reform.

== Academic pursuits ==
As chairman of the FCE, Rupesinghe provided policy support for the Sri Lankan peace process by writing articles and issue papers and participating in seminars and TV opinion programmes. This role supported continued public engagement and exchange with key decision-makers, stakeholders, and fellow civil society organisations.

Since his return to Sri Lanka after the signing of the ceasefire agreement between the government and the LTTE in 2002, he initiated the National Anti-War Front (NAWF) with a presence throughout Sri Lanka. It has been engaged in public demonstrations, sit-ins, and vigils to call for peace and a negotiated solution to the country's civil war.

While his nation building efforts were invaluable, Rupesinghe remained open to criticism. He encouraged open discussions with such individuals and groups and believed that transparency and dialogue is the only way of reaching a national consensus on the issue.

Among his contributions were advancing early warning and conflict resolution, understanding the role of third parties in the mediation of protracted internal conflicts, and developing a concept of multitrack solutions to civil wars.

He contributed to early warning systems for the EU and the OAU, and sought to influence policy debate in the UK, Canada, Norway, Sweden, the Netherlands, Finland, Denmark, Germany, and Japan, where his efforts led to the formation of the Centre for Preventive Diplomacy.

== International achievements ==
Rupesinghe also served as a member of the board on the United Nations Research Institute for Social Development (UNRISD)'s Project on War Torn Societies.

== Professional achievements ==
Rupesinghe was chair of HURIDOCS (Human Rights Documentation Systems Exchange International) and was appointed chair of the Programme on Culture and Ethnicity of Japan's Sasakawa Peace Foundation. This programme will publish over five volumes on culture and identity.

He was chair of the Forum for Early Warning and Early Action (FEWER), an ongoing initiative to establish an international early warning network.

He was appointed a member of the Atlanta-based Council of the International Negotiation Network, led by former President Carter, and acted as an advisor for his initiatives on peace.

He was a council member of the Commission in Globalisation of former Russian President Gorbachev's State of the World Forum.

== Personal life and death ==
Rupesinghe died on 22 February 2022, at the age of 79.

== Publications ==
Rupesinghe edited or wrote over 40 books and published over 200 articles in academic journals. Some of his writings include Civil War Civil Peace, Conflict Transformation, and Early Warning, Early Response. He recently released his collected works under the titles Waging Peace 2002-2008, Preventive Diplomacy, Early Warning, Conflict Resolution and Transformation Vols. I and II, Development and Conflict in Sri Lanka, Expressions of an Unequivocal Mind, and The Voice Vols. I and II.
