= Continental Early Warning System =

The Continental Early Warning System (CEWS) is a conflict early warning operation within the African Peace and Security architecture (APSA) of the African Union. Its continued development was supported by United Nations Security Council Resolution 1809. The CEWS is tasked with gathering and analyzing data and is required to work in partnership with “the United Nations (UN), its agencies, other relevant international organizations, research centers, academic institutions, and Nongovernmental Organizations (NGOs).” The information it collects is intended to assist the Chairperson of the Commission in advising the Peace and Security Council (PSC) on potential conflicts and threats to peace and security in Africa, as well as recommending the most effective courses of action. The major objectives of the Continental Early Warning System are to anticipate and prevent conflicts on the African continent and to provide up-to-date information on evolving violent conflicts which are based upon specific indicators.

The Continental Early Warning System is designed to gather, analyze, disseminate, and provide timely alerts about emerging threats to prevent violence and promote peace. CEWS enables collaboration between African states to address mutual security challenges. (3) The systems’ goals also include addressing the root causes of violence on the continent including poverty and inequality to foster sustainable solutions to conflict and aid peacekeeping missions.

CEWS works in collaboration with the Peace and Security Council of the African Union to provide data and analysis that inform decision-making processes regarding conflict resolution. The Peace and Security Council uses alerts from the early warning system to prioritize interventions and effectively allocate resources. Overall, the partnership and establishment of the CEWS has enhanced the AU’s ability to respond to emerging threats and has strengthened regional security.

== Background ==
The Framework for the Operationalization of the CEWS was adopted during the Governmental Experts meeting on early warning and conflict prevention in South Africa in 2006. This framework was later approved by the 10th Ordinary Session of the Executive Council in Addis Ababa in January 2007. The Council directed the Commission to take all necessary measures to ensure the timely and complete implementation of the Framework. This included securing financial and technical resources from both AU Member States and partners, quickly recruiting the required human resources, and taking other relevant actions to make the CEWS fully operational within three years, by 2009.

Article 12 of the PSC Protocol relating to the Establishment of the Peace and Security Council (PSC) creates a specific structure consisting of two units – an observation and monitoring unit and unit for conflict prevention. The observation and monitoring is known as “the Situation Room.” The Situation Room is located at the Conflict Prevention and Early Warning Division of the African Union and responsible for data collection and analysis. The observation and monitoring units of the Regional Mechanisms for Conflict Prevention, Management and Resolution are directly linked to the Situation Room.

== Technical Components of the Continental Early Warning System ==
The CEWS uses satellite imagery, media reports, and intelligence from on-the-ground sources to determine potential threats and vulnerabilities. (3) The CEWS is an open-source system that includes information from a variety of sources. Most of the information gathered is generated by the African Union Commission (AUC) itself. The CEWS operates 24/7 to monitor information and collect data on ongoing and potential conflict situations in Africa.

== Successes, Limitations, and Challenges of the Continental Early Warning System ==
According to experts, CEWS has made progress in its capacity to monitor and analyze ongoing conflicts and provide warnings prior to conflict, however many challenges remain for the system. CEWS has played a major role in enhancing regional collaboration and improving response times to potential conflicts.

The Continental Early Warning System has also faced challenges since its inception. The CEWS is constrained by limited human resources, rudimentary cooperation in regard to information sharing, and unsystematic coordination among subgroups within the African Union. Due to a myriad of political disagreements, disputes in contested regions, and issues of sovereignty, the CEWS is often prevented from being effective in providing preventative action.

A comprehensive evaluation revealed that while significant progress has been made in preventing violence with the CEWS, more effort and resources are needed to strengthen institutional capacities of the system and ensure stakeholder commitment.

The 2006 meeting on the Continental Early Warning system concludes with a recommendation for the AU Commission on Governmental Experts to meet within two years, to review the progress made and chart the best way forward as they work toward an effective and proactive response system.
