= United Nations Global Pulse =

The United Nations Global Pulse is an initiative of the United Nations that attempts to "bring real-time monitoring and prediction to development and aid programs."

== History and activities ==
The United Nations Global Pulse was launched in 2009 as an information initiative by the Executive Office of the United Nations Secretary-General. In August 2013, The New York Times reported that Global Pulse had its main "Pulse Lab" in New York City, with a staff of 14 there, plus a staff of 10 in their lab in Jakarta, Indonesia and 8 in their lab in Kampala, Uganda. The website lists the following three objectives of the initiative:

1. Increasing the number of Big Data for Development (BD4D) innovation success cases
2. Lowering systemic barriers to big data for development adoption and scaling
3. Strengthening cooperation within the big data for development ecosystem

The data sources that Global Pulse has investigated include:

1. Online content: Public news stories, blogs, Twitter, Facebook, obituaries, birth announcements, job postings, e- commerce, etc.
2. Data exhaust: Anonymized data generated through the use of services such as telecommunications, mobile banking, online search, hotline usage, transit, etc.
3. Physical sensors - Satellite imagery, video, traffic sensors, etc.
4. Crowdsourced reports - Information actively produced or submitted by citizens through mobile phone-based surveys, user generated maps, etc.

Global Pulse runs innovation programmes in which it partners with organizations that have access to relevant sources of big data, data analytics technologies, and data science expertise, as well as with UN agency and government ministry "problem owners" grappling with challenges that could benefit from new insights and real-time measurement tools, to discover, build and test high-potential applications of big data. Its innovation programmes focus on sectors such as food security, agriculture, employment, infectious disease, urbanization, and disaster response, as well as cross-cutting issues such as M&E and privacy protection.

The director of the initiative is Robert Kirkpatrick and the deputy director is Makena Walker.

== Media coverage ==
The United Nations Global Pulse has been discussed repeatedly in The Guardian and Foreign Policy.

It has also received in-depth coverage in The New York Times, O'Reilly Media, and United Nations Radio. It has also been mentioned in a Wall Street Journal article about Teradata

== See also ==
- Global Database of Events, Language, and Tone
