= David Nyheim =

David Nyheim (born 1970) is a Norwegian peace-maker and early warning expert. His work has focused on dialogue process design and implementation, conflict resolution, conflict early warning, stabilisation, as well as forecasting and strategy.

== Career history ==
After several years in the humanitarian and public health fields, he was recruited in 1997 to establish the Forum on Early Warning and Early Response (FEWER).

After leaving FEWER in 2003, Nyheim established International Conflict and Security (INCAS) Consulting Ltd. (United Kingdom) together with Anton Ivanov, Samuel Gbaydee Doe, and Tom Porteous. He served as its chief executive till 2014, after which he became the chairman of the INCAS Consulting Ltd. and its affiliated consulting companies. Lessons learnt from his work on preventing petroleum-related violent conflicts were published in "Balancing Petroleum Policy: Toward Value, Sustainability, and Security" by the World Bank in 2019.

In 2003, he co-authored the Peace and Security Strategy (PASS) for Shell Nigeria that predicted serious instability in the Niger Delta. Nyheim returned to the North Caucasus in 2005, where worked with Anton Ivanov and others on a Strategic Reconstruction and Development Assessment for the Foreign and Commonwealth Office (United Kingdom).

Nyheim's has undertaken studies, "Preventing Violence, War, and State Collapse. The Future of Conflict Early Warning and Response" for the Organisation for Economic Co-operation and Development and "Early warning and response to violent conflict: Time for a rethink?" for Saferworld.

== Publications ==
- Nyheim, D (2019) "Petroleum Development and Conflict Prevention Strategies" in Balancing Petroleum Policy: Toward Value, Sustainability, and Security. World Bank. Washington, DC.
- Nyheim, D (2015) Early warning and response to violent conflict: Time for a rethink? Saferworld. London.
- Nyheim, D and Ivanov, A. (2014) Stabilising Areas Affected by Criminalised Violent Conflict: A Guide for Analysis and Strategy. INCAS in Practice Series, 01/14. Urban Guru Publishers. London.
- Nyheim, D and Chalabi, M. (2012) Corporate Implementation of the Guiding Principles: A Guide on How to Review Performance and Implement the Guiding Principles on Business and Human Rights. INCAS in Practice Series, 01/12. London, October 2012.
- Nyheim, D. (2009) Preventing Violence, War, and State Collapse. The Future of Conflict Early Warning and Response. Organisation for Economic Cooperation and Development (OECD)/DAC. Paris.
  - PDF
- Ivanov, A., Mukomolov, A., Nyheim, D., Porteous, T., and Tartarinova, K. (alphabetical order) (2006) Strategic Reconstruction and Development Assessment: North Caucasus. Study commissioned by the Global Conflict Prevention Pool, United Kingdom. Published by FEWER Eurasia, Moscow.
- Piza-Lopez, E., Nyheim, D., and Trijono, L. (2005) Peace and Development Analysis: A Resource Pack. United Nations Development Programme (UNDP)/Indonesia, Jakarta.
