= Lockheed Martin Advanced Technology Laboratories =

- Founded: 1929
- Founder: Dr. Edward Kellogg
- Headquarters: Cherry Hill, NJ, United States
- Number of employees: 250
- Parent: Lockheed Martin Corporation
- Website: www.lockheedmartin.com/en-us/capabilities/research-labs/advanced-technology-labs.html

Lockheed Martin Advanced Technology Laboratories (ATL) is a department of Lockheed Martin headquartered in Cherry Hill, New Jersey, that specializes in applied research and development. Additional facilities are located in Eagan, Minnesota, Kennesaw, Georgia, and Arlington, Virginia, employing approximately 250 people in total.

As of 2018, the department is pursuing research in human systems optimization, electronic warfare, robotic autonomy, and data analytics. ATL's primary research partners include DARPA, U.S. government laboratories, universities, and Lockheed Martin's Skunk Works and Advanced Technology Center.

On June 21, 2024, the department was sanctioned by the Chinese government due to arm sales to Taiwan.
