= Thelma Ekiyor =

Nigerian peace activist

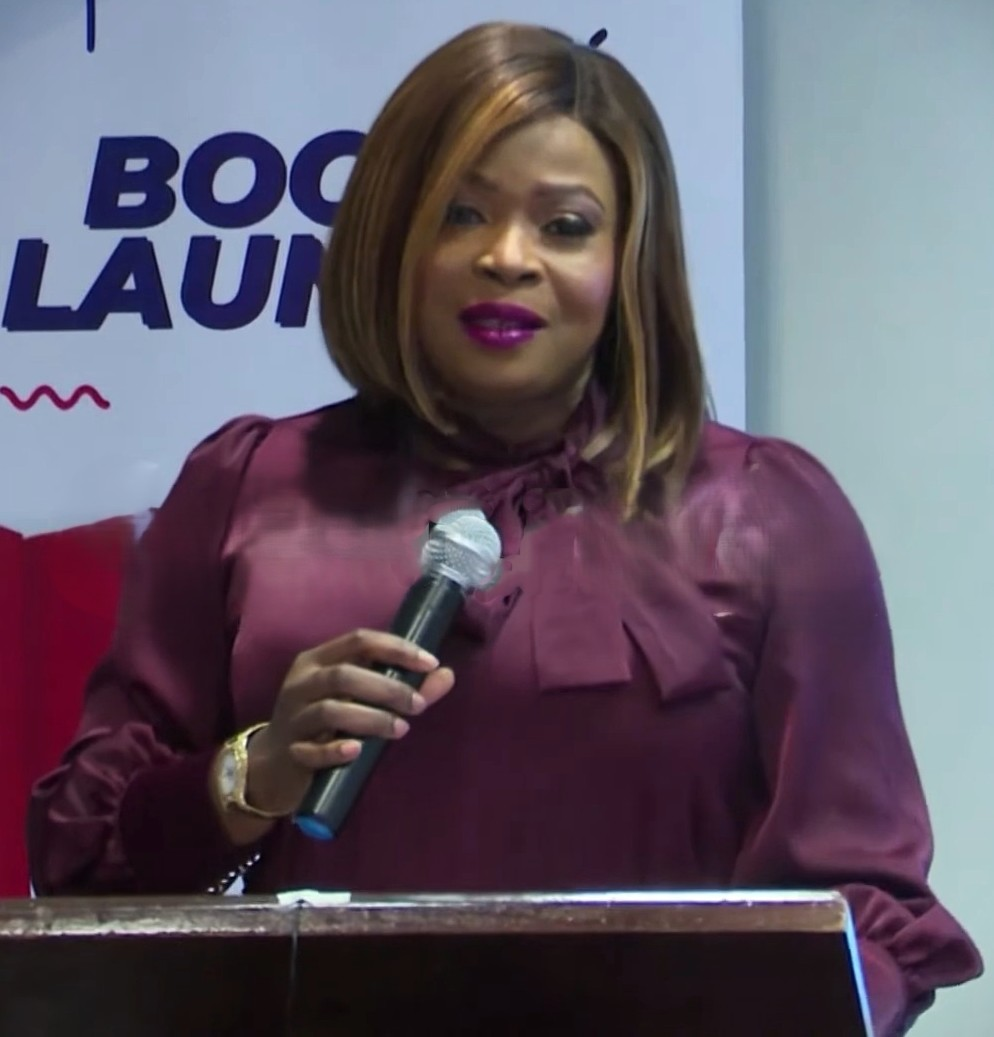
- Ekiyor in 2020
- Born: Thelma Arimiebi Ekiyor
- Other name: Solanke
- Education: Imperial College; University of Buckingham
- Occupations: lawyer; social entrepreneur; investor; philanthropist

Thelma Arimiebi Ekiyor is a Nigerian lawyer, social entrepreneur and impact investor who has served in authoritative positions within many organizations. Ekiyor has focused primarily on investing in women entrepreneurs. She started her career supporting women in peacebuilding and empowering women and youth through financial independence and educational access. She has experience with projects in more than 22 African countries. Ekiyor worked in post-conflict countries such as Liberia with the peace activist Leymah Gbowee.

== Education ==
Thelma Ekiyor received her MBA in Entrepreneurship and Innovation from Imperial College London, UK, and holds a law degree with LLB Honours from the University of Buckingham. She is an alumna of the African Women's Leadership Institute, and of the 2002 Summer Peacebuilding Institute at the Eastern Mennonite University in the United States, which is deeply connected with WANEP and WISPEN-Africa. Ekiyor is also a Fellow of Stanford University.

== Peacebuilding ==
From 2005 to 2007, Ekiyor was Senior Manager of the Conflict Intervention and Peacebuilding Support Project (CIPS) at the Center for Conflict Resolution (CCR) at the University of Cape Town, South Africa. In this position, she helped to expand the post-conflict capacity of African nations undergoing reconstruction. In 2005, Ekiyor and Razaan Bailey wrote a report on the Prisons Transformation Project (PTP), called "Promoting Restorative Justice in South Africa's Correctional Services", which dealt with international perspectives on themes of restorative justice. In 2006, Ekiyor and Noria Mashumba wrote a policy seminar report called "The Peace-building role of Civil Society in Central Africa". At the seminar, Ekiyor delivered a speech at the Women and Peace Processes session, titled "The Role of Civil Society in Implementing International and Regional Frameworks on Women, Peace and Security".

After serving at the CCR, Ekiyor became the Executive Director of the West Africa Civil Society Institute (WASCI), based in Ghana. She helped establish connections between donors and international organizations, and created WASCI's civil society capacity building strategy and Policy Influencing platform.

Outside Africa, Ekiyor sits on the advisory boards of the US-based Women Empowerment Centre (WEC) and the Rising Leadership Foundation. She is also currently a board member on ALL ON, which was established by Shell and is a renewable energy impact fund in West Africa.

=== African women in peacebuilding ===
From 2001 to 2005, Ekiyor was the Director of Programs for the West Africa Network for Peacebuilding (WANEP). After multiple civil in West African nations in the 1990s, WANEP was founded in 1998. The organization focuses on collaborative conflict prevention and peacebuilding, provides courses on these issues, and partners with other actors in the hope of establishing "a platform for dialogue", and sustainable peace and development in the region.

Through her connections with WANEP, Ekiyor received support and funding for her idea of creating a women-focused and women-led pan-African organization that would focus on including women in peace and negotiation processes. Following the passage of UNSC Resolution 1325, Ekiyor hoped that this organization would help create real change and allow women's voices to be heard. In 2001, Ekiyor's idea became the Women in Peacebuilding Network (WIPNET), which celebrated its launch in Accra, Ghana. WIPNET works to improve women's peacebuilding and post conflict reconstruction capacity in West Africa. At the time of the launch of WIPNET, Ekiyor herself wrote an organizer's training manual that included exercises designed to empower, engage, and educate women.

In her 2011 memoir, Mighty Be Our Powers, Leymah Gbowee explains that "from the start, WIPNET had been Thelma's baby. She brought the idea to WANEP and assembled the first training group, and the peace-building manual she relied on when she taught us--the book full of exercises now being used throughout the conflict resolution movement--was something she'd worked on for years."

In 2006, Ekiyor co-founded the Women Peace and Security Network Africa (WIPSEN-A). Along with Leymah Gbowee and Ecoma Alaga, she hoped to transform WIPNET into an organization that operated independently from WANEP, so that the initiative would not be "a women's network controlled financially by men". They also hoped to diversify and increase the sustainability of the initiative by expanding the network across all of Africa and involving the generation of young women below them.

== African women's financial empowerment ==
Ekiyor is the co-founder and CEO of Afrigrants Resources Ltd, an organization that focuses on finding business solutions that address social problems, with an emphasis on under-development and women's financial inclusion. At Afrigrants, Ekiyor designed Market Women's Quick Cash, a program which provides micro-loans to women. In 2017, Ekiyor founded the Funding Space, which is meant to help social entrepreneurs in West Africa gain training and access to financial platforms. At the Funding Space, Ekiyor co-founded the Ebi Fund, which is specifically for women entrepreneurs. Ekiyor is also a Managing Director at SME.NG, Nigeria's Impact Investment Platform, which also provides funds to women entrepreneurs.

Ekiyor has also been a Strategic Policy Advisor to UN Women Nigeria, as well as a senior consultant to the African Union, ECA, IGAD, and ECOWAS. In 2010, UN Women called for collaboration between civil society, the private sector, and governments in pursuit of Sustainable Development Goal (SDG) 5, which pushes for gender equality and female empowerment. Ekiyor spoke to the importance of long term and sustainable goals, as expressed her belief that investing in women helps broader societal development, saying that "investing in SDG-5 would facilitate the implementation of all the SDGs in Nigeria, which would also advance business and economic goals". At a meeting between representatives from the UN and African Union in 2017, Ekiyor stated that "[they] have created silos in peace and security, but economic independence is a hallmark of peace and security," drawing attention to her belief in the importance of including women in the private sector and in conversations surrounding peace and security.

== Nigeria ==
In 2010, Ekiyor was appointed the first Executive Director of the TY Danjuma Foundation (TYDF), which focuses on improving access to health care and education to those who live in the Taraba State, a region in North East Nigeria. In 2011, TYDF commissioned a community school project that would establish the first formal school in Fulatara, a community in Bauchi State, Nigeria. At the commissioning, Ekiyor stated that "educational development could only be achieved through community participation with enabling leadership role of the government," and emphasized the importance of enrolling girls.

In 2020, Ekiyor was appointed chairperson of the Micro, Small and Medium-sized businesses' division of the Nigerian Association of Chambers of Commerce, Industry, Mines and Agriculture (NACCIMA). In this role, Ekiyor will work with small businesses with the goal of improving their capabilities and benefiting the overall Nigerian economy.

== Liberia ==
At a WANEP conference in Ghana in 2000, Ekiyor met Leymah Gbowee, the 2011 Nobel Peace Prize laureate who was central to the movement to include women in the peaceful resolution of the Second Liberian Civil War. Ekiyor encouraged, mentored, and worked alongside Leymah Gbowee during this process, and the two women became very close. In her 2011 memoir, Gbowee writes: "Thelma isn't just my friend; she's my sister, my twin, my shadow self, and someone who understands the political side of me in a way no one else does."

After WIPNET's founding, Ekiyor appointed Gbowee as the coordinator of the Liberian WIPNET chapter. The two women continued to work together later when they founded WIPSEN-Africa in 2006.

== Awards ==
In 2015, Ekiyor was nominated for the Pan African Leaders Award as a Preserver of Peace and Security. The annual award, granted by the African Democratic Institute (ADI), followed the United Nations (UN) theme for World Humanitarian Day to nominate those who inspire humanity.
