= Jay Ulfelder =

American Political Scientist

Jay Ulfelder is an American political scientist who is best known for his work on political forecasting, specifically on anticipating various forms of political instability around the world. From 2001 to 2010, he served as research director of the Political Instability Task Force (PITF), which is funded by the Central Intelligence Agency. He is also the author of a book and several journal articles on democratization, democratic backsliding, and contentious politics.

In the 2010s, Ulfelder maintained a blog called Dart-Throwing Chimp that offered commentary on geopolitical forecasting and other topics. Around the same time, he worked as a consultant to the Simon-Skjodt Center for the Prevention of Genocide at the United States Holocaust Memorial Museum on the design of a public early warning system for mass atrocities in countries worldwide. From 2017 to 2019, Ulfelder worked for Koto, the national security and risk division of Kensho Technologies, on the development of software to support the work geopolitical analysts.

In 2020, Ulfelder became a Carr Center Fellow at the Harvard Kennedy School to work with Erica Chenoweth as program director for the Nonviolent Action Lab. In early 2025, Ulfelder resigned from his position in protest of Harvard's incorporation of the International Holocaust Remembrance Alliance (IHRA)'s controversial Working Definition of Antisemitism into its guidelines after the university reached a settlement with plaintiff students who had sued the university for not taking appropriate action to protect Jewish students from antisemitism. The adoption of the IHRA's amounts to equating many criticisms of Israel with antisemitism.

== Reception ==
Ulfelder has been cited and quoted as an expert on political forecasting and political instability in the New York Times and the Washington Post.

Ulfelder is an occasional contributor to Foreign Policy and FiveThirtyEight. One of his pieces in Foreign Policy, on why forecasting political violence and unusual situations around the world was considerably harder than forecasting the results of elections in the United States, received a lengthy response from Michael Ward and Nils Mitternich.

In 2014, Ulfelder was interviewed on The Agenda with Steve Paikin about his work forecasting mass atrocities. He has also been interviewed by Strife blog and by the Center for Data Innovation and gave a talk at TEDx Tbilisi in 2013.
