= Ali Gohar =

Pakistani scholar

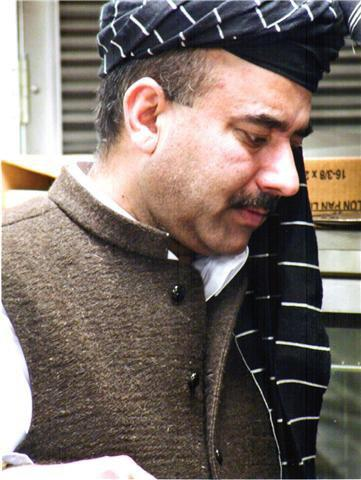
- Born: Syed Ali Gohar; 1956; Pakistan
- Died: 2024 (aged 67–68)
- Education: Quaid-i-Azam University (MSc); Eastern Mennonite University (MA)
- Known for: Just Peace Initiatives

Syed Ali Gohar (1956–2024) was a Pakistani restorative justice scholar. He was the founder and executive director of Just Peace Initiatives (formerly Just Peace International).

== Biography ==
Ali Gohar was born in Kaala, a village in Swabi District, Khyber Pakhtunkhwa, Pakistan. Gohar holds an MSc in international relations from Quaid-i-Azam University, Islamabad, and an MA in conflict transformation from Eastern Mennonite University, in Harrisonburg, Virginia.

For thirteen years until early 2001, Gohar served as the Additional Commissioner of the Social Welfare Cell for Afghan refugees, a UNHCR project operating across 258 refugee camps in northern Pakistan, with programmes covering HIV/AIDS awareness, peacebuilding, and community development.

In 2001, he was awarded a Fulbright scholarship pursue his master's degree at Eastern Mennonite University's Center for Justice and Peacebuilding, where he worked closely with restorative justice scholar Howard Zehr. The two later collaborate on a revision edition of 'The Little Book of Restorative Justice' at the Pakistan-Afghanistan context.

Shortly after returning to Pakistan in 2003 Gohar founded Just Peace International (now Just Peace Initiatives), a non-profit aimed at working for peace and justice through conflict transformation practices. As part of this work, he received a United States Institute of Peace (USIP) grant to explore the principles of Jirga as peacebuilding.

In 2006, Gohar joined Oxfam Great Britain as a campaign officer to end honour killings and address violence against women in Khyber Pakhtunkhwa (formerly known as the North-West Frontier Province), before returning Just Peace Initiatives as executive director.

== Notable work ==
Gohar published a number of works on restorative justice and jirga practices. In June 2002, he led a workshop in Peshawar, Pakistan titled, "Conflict transformation and peace building in Pakistan and Afghanistan", addressing community peacebuilding and restorative justice. In 2007 he produced at a thirteen-episode television program for a Pakistani television channel titled, "Why it's happened", examine the root causes of ethnic, tribal, and political conflict through interviews with police, religious scholars, jirga practitioners, and psychologists.

He also wrote scripts for nationally broadcast television programmes addressing drug use, HIV/AIDS prevention, domestic violence, and honour killings.
