= Hizkias Assefa =

Ethiopian consultant

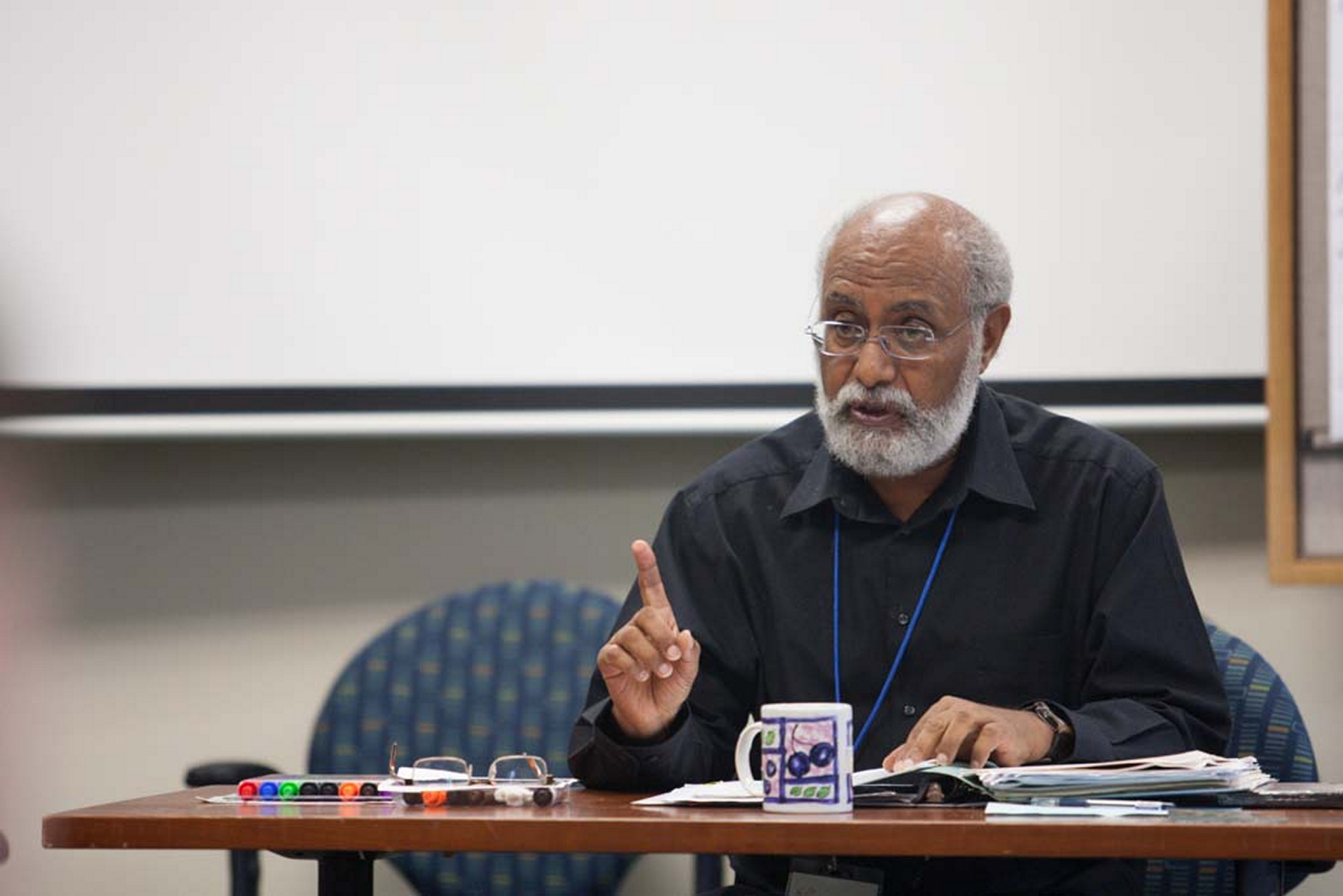
- Hizkias Assefa teaches a class at Eastern Mennonite University's Summer Peacebuilding Institute
- Born: 1948 (age 77–78); Addis Ababa, Shewa, Ethiopia
- Education: LLB, Haile Selassie I University, Addis Ababa, Ethiopia; LLM, Northwestern University, Chicago, Illinois; M.A. Economics, University of Pittsburgh, Pittsburgh, Pennsylvania; M.P.A., Ph.D., Public and International Affairs, University of Pittsburgh, Pittsburgh, Pennsylvania
- Occupations: peacebuilding, conflict analyst
- Known for: Reconciliation and Peacebuilding Work

Hizkias Assefa (born 1948) is a conflict mediator known widely in Africa for his non-aligned work as a consultant who has mediated in most major conflict situations in sub-Saharan Africa in the past 20 years, as well as in a dozen countries elsewhere. He is also a professor of conflict studies. Of Ethiopian origin, he is based in Nairobi, Kenya. He was one of the founding faculty members in 1994 of the Conflict Transformation Program (now the Center for Justice and Peacebuilding) at Eastern Mennonite University.

== Early life ==
Hizkias Assefa was born in Addis Ababa, Ethiopia in 1948. He remained there into his early adulthood and studied law at Haile Selassie I University in Addis Ababa. After graduating he worked as a lawyer in Addis Ababa until 1973. At this point he obtained a student visa for the United States and left Ethiopia to continue his education and to avoid the violence brought about by the military dictatorship known as the Derg. He received his LLM from Northwestern University in Chicago, his M.A. in economics and his Master's in public management and Ph.D. in public and international affairs from the University of Pittsburgh. He is married and has two daughters.

== Work ==
Most of Assefa's work has centered around mediating between warring parties and resolving conflict. In 2013–14, he was the mediator in the conflict between the Government of the Republic of South Sudan and an insurgency movement called the South Sudan Democratic Movement/Army that led to a two-part peace agreement: a cease fire and cessation of hostilities agreement in January 2014, followed by a comprehensive peace accord in May 2014 which aimed to address the political, economic, social, military and security issues and interests of the warring parties underlying the conflict.

Assefa has worked in over 50 countries. He is a Senior Special Fellow at the United Nations Institute of Training and Research in Geneva. He has also been involved as a facilitator in grassroots peacebuilding and reconciliation initiatives in Ghana, Nigeria, Sierra Leone, Liberia, Kenya, South Africa, Sri Lanka, Afghanistan, Colombia, and Guatemala. He has served as a consultant to the United Nations, European Union, and many international and national NGOs and conducted conflict resolution and peacebuilding training seminars and workshops in many parts of the world. He also serves on the global advisory board for Human Dignity and Humiliation Studies. In 2008 Assefa was invited to join the mediation team working to stop the post-election violence in Kenya and create a power-sharing government by former secretary general of the United Nations, Kofi Annan. Other team members included former president of Tanzania, Benjamin Mkapa, and the former first lady of Mozambique and of South Africa, Graça Machel.

Assefa was formerly a Senior Distinguished Fellow at the Institute of Conflict Analysis and Resolution at George Mason University in Fairfax, VA, and he has served as a resident scholar in a number of universities including Brandeis University in Waltham, MA. He is currently a professor at Eastern Mennonite University's Summer Peacebuilding Institute at the Center for Justice and Peacebuilding. He is also the Consulting Director at Peacemakers Trust.

… if one is allowed to work with the parties step by step and layer by layer, it is possible to get them to meet at a deep level when they recognize the humanity of each other and recognize that their commonalities are much greater than their differences. And based on that they can have the vision, fortitude and mutual tolerance to work towards peace and reconciliation.

== Publications ==
A list of Hizkias Assefa's publications:

- Preconditions for the Success of Mediation of Internal Wars, in Towards a World of Peace, edited by J. Maas and R. Stewart, Suva, Fiji: University of South Pacific Press, 1986
- WCC Mediation in the Sudan Civil Wars, in New Approaches to International Mediation, edited by Chris Mitchell and K. Webb, New York: Greenwood Press, 1988
- Crisis Management: Case Study of the MOVE Bombing in Philadelphia, in Coping with Crisis, edited by U. Rosenthal and M. Charles, Chicago: Charles C. Thomas Publishers, 1989
- Sudan 1972: An Approach to Peacemaking, Life and Peace Review, Vol. 2, No. 3, 1988
- Conflict Resolution Perspectives on Civil Wars in the Horn of Africa, Negotiation Journal, April, 1990
- Religion in the Sudan: Exacerbating Conflict or Facilitating Reconciliation? Bulletin of Peace Proposals, no. 3, 1990
- Looking Beyond the Termination of Civil Wars in Ethiopia: Demobilization and Employment of Combatants, in Beyond the Wars: Prospects for Peace, Recovery and Development in the Horn of Africa, edited by Martin Dornboos, The Hague: Institute of Social Studies, 1991
- Ethnic Conflict in Africa: A New Perspective—Thoughts for Eastern Europe, Conflict Resolution Notes, Vol. 9, No. 2, Sept. 1991
- An Interest Approach to the Resolution of the Ethiopian - Eritrean Conflict, in Internal Conflicts and Governance, edited by Kumar Rupesinghe, Oslo: Peace Research Institute, 1992
- The Role of Mediation in National Conflicts - The Sudan Experience, in Conflicts and Negotiations, Bonn: Herbert Quandt Foundation, 1992
- The Challenges of Mediating Internal Wars: Reflections on the INN initiative in the Eritrean Conflict, Security Dialogue, Vol. 23, No. 3, September 1992
- Being in the Middle: Reflections from Experiences in Africa, in Proceedings of the Conference on "75 Years of Quaker International Affairs Work", Philadelphia: American Friends Service Committee, 1992
- Confessions of a Peacemaker, in Citizens as Peacemakers, edited by Ed Garcia, Manila: University of the Philippines Press, 1994
- Frieden und Aussohnung in Athiopien - Perspektiven und Ansatze, in Entwicklungspolitik: Materialien 1/93, February 1993
- Crucible of Civilization and Conflicts: Ethiopia, in Arms and Daggers in the Heart of Africa: Studies in Internal Conflicts, edited by Peter Anyang Nyongo, Nairobi: Academy of Sciences Publishers, 1993
- The Politics of Reconciliation, in Constructive Approaches to Community and Political Conflict, Track Two, published by the Center for Conflict Resolution, Vol. 3, No. 4, Rondebosh, South Africa, December 1994
- Mediating a Conflict Within a Conflict, in Citizens as Peacemakers, edited by Ed Garcia, Manila: University of the Philippines Press, 1994
- Ethnic Conflicts in the Horn of Africa, Myths and Reality, in Ethnicity and Power in the Contemporary World, edited by Kumar Rupsenghe and Andrei Tishkov, Tokyo: United Nations University, 1995
- Healing and Reconciliation in Internal Conflicts, in Transformation Towards a Culture of Peace, 2nd International Forum on the Culture of Peace, Paris: UNESCO, 1995
- Humanitarian Work and Peacebuilding in UNHCR, PTSS Discussion Paper No. 14, Geneva, April, 1997
- The Meaning of Reconciliation, in People Building Peace, European Center for Conflict Prevention: Utrecht, 1999 (Published in French and English)
- Regional Analysis of the State of Conflict and Peace in the Horn of Africa, in Searching for Peace in Africa, edited by European Platform for Conflict Prevention and Transformation, Utrecht, 1999 (Published in English and French)
- La Reconciliation, in Construire La Paix Sur Le Terrain, Mode D'Emploi, ed. Luc Reichler and Thania Paffenholz, Lynne Reinner: Boulder, Colorado, 2001 (Published in French, English, and Dutch).
- Coexistence and Reconciliation in the Northern Region of Ghana, in Reconciliation, Justice and Coexistence: Theory and Practice, ed. Mohammed Abunimer, Lanham: Lexington Press, 2001
- "Embodying Peace", in Into the Eyes of the Storm: Handbook of International Peacebuilding, ed. John Paul Lederach, Westview Press: Boulder, Colorado, 2002.
- "Interfaith Cooperation: Religious Actors in New Roles", in New Routes, A Journal of Peace Research and Action, Vol. 7, No.4, 2002
- "Tread Carefully: Challenges Influencing Policy in Conflict Situations", in NGOs at the Table: Strategies for Influencing Policy in Areas of Conflict ed., Marie Fitzduff, University of Ulster Press: Derry, Northern Ireland, 2004
- "Challenges to Faith Institutions in a Troubled Global Order" in To Seek Peace, Justice and Sustainable Lifestyle, An Interfaith Cooperation in Asia, ed. Tony Waworuntu and Max Ediger, Christian Council of Asia: Hong Kong, 2004
- "Tools for Peace: Critical Perspective on Peace Theory and Practice", in New Routes, A Journal of Peace Research and Action, Vol. 8, No. 3-4, 2004
- "Reconciliation: Challenges, Responses and Roles for Civil Society", in People Building Peace II, European Center for Conflict Prevention: Utrecht, 2005
- "A Mediator Talks, An Interview with Prof. Hizkias Assefa", Wajibu, A Journal of Social and Ethical Concern, Vol. 22, No. 1 (April – May 2007)
- Mediation of Civil Wars, Approaches and Strategies ‑ The Sudan Conflict, Boulder, Colo.: Westview Press, 1987.
- Extremist Groups and Conflict Resolution: The MOVE Crisis in Philadelphia, New York: Praeger Publishers, 1988; republished by the University of Pittsburgh Press, 1990.
- Peace and Reconciliation as a Paradigm: A Philosophy of Peace and its Implications on Conflicts, Governance, and Economic Development in Africa, Nairobi: ACIS Press, 1993. (Translated in French, Spanish, Portuguese, Arabic, Kirundi and Korean)
- Peacemaking and Democratization in Africa: Theoretical Perspectives and Church Initiatives, Nairobi: East African Educational Publishers, 1996 (editor)
