= Tecla Namachanja Wanjala =

Kenyan peace activist

- Born: Tecla Namachanja Wanjala; 11 January 1962 (age 64); Bungoma, Kenya
- Education: M.A. in Conflict Transformation Center for Justice and Peacebuilding, Eastern Mennonite University, Harrisonburg, VA, Ph.D. Peace and Conflict Studies Masinde Muliro University of Science and Technology, Kakamega, Kenya
- Known for: Acting Chairperson on The Truth, Justice and Reconciliation Commission of Kenya
- Awards: Nominee for the 2005 Nobel Peace Prize

Tecla Namachanja Wanjala (born 1962) is a conflict resolution, post-conflict rehabilitation, and development worker from Kenya. She was the Acting Chair of The Truth, Justice and Reconciliation Commission of Kenya. She has five children

== Early life and education ==
Tecla Namachanja Wanjala was born in 1962 in the Bungoma District of Western Province in Kenya. After finishing her secondary education Wanjala pursued further training in social work, concluding in 1991. She received her master's degree in Conflict Transformation from the Center for Justice and Peacebuilding at Eastern Mennonite University in Harrisonburg, Virginia, in 2003. After returning to Kenya she continued her education, completing her Ph.D. in Peace and Conflict Studies at Masinde Muliro University of Science and Technology in Kakamega, Kenya, in 2014.

== Career ==
In war everybody is a victim. For one to reconcile communities, one needs to rise from being a wounded victim to a wounded healer. I am a wounded healer. - Tecla Wanjala

After completing her social work degree she began working in a refugee camp in Bungoma, Kenya teaching Kiswahili to children there. While working as a teacher she organized refugees into farming projects in order to help relieve the hunger and deprivation of the camp. In 1992 she took as position as Relief and Reconciliation Coordinator for the Bungoma Diocese of the Catholic Church where she continued her work in caring for refugee families. During her time in the refugee camps she was able to resettle and reintegrate nearly all internally displaced victims into their original, or new communities. In 1996 Wanjala began work with the Peace and Development Network of the NGO Council, known as PeaceNet. In this position she coordinated member activities, fundraising, and ran trainings for hundreds of workers in conflict transformation. She left this position to pursue a master's degree in the United States. Upon returning to Kenya after her studies at the Center for Justice and Peacebuilding she began working for the Japan International Cooperation Agency (JICA). It was during her work at JICA that she was nominated for the Nobel Peace Prize as one of the 1000 women of peace. In 2010 Wanjala began serving as Vice Chair, then Acting Chair on The Truth, Justice and Reconciliation Commission of Kenya. She was the first woman to lead a truth commission. The commission’s work focused on addressing issues of justice and reconciliation from 12 December 1963 and 28 February 2008. Their report was presented to President Uhuru Kenyatta in 2013. During her career Wanjala has also participated in negotiations and trainings in Sudan, Rwanda, and Ethiopia. She has also been a speaker at a variety of conferences including the International Conference on Peace and International Relations.

== Works ==
Report of the Truth, Justice and Reconciliation Commission (four volumes in six parts)
