= Bethwell =

Bethwell is a masculine given name of Kenyan origin. It is a variant of the biblical name Bethuel. Notable people with the name include:

- Bethwell Allan Ogot (1929–2025), Kenyan historian
- Bethwell Birgen (born 1988), Kenyan middle-distance runner
- Bethwell Kiplagat, Kenyan jurist, ambassador and chair of The Truth, Justice and Reconciliation Commission of Kenya
