= Center for Justice and Peacebuilding =

Center for Justice and Peacebuilding at Eastern Mennonite University
- Type: Graduate education, accredited through master’s level; also offers courses for non-credit training purposes.
- Established: 1994-95
- Parent institution: Eastern Mennonite University
- Affiliations: Mennonite Church USA
- Director: Founding director, John Paul Lederach; executive director since 2013, J. Daryl Byler
- Academic staff: 6 dedicated faculty; 7 adjunct; 16 additional instructors at annual Summer Peacebuilding Institute
- Location: Harrisonburg, Virginia, USA; 38.470966°N 78.879519°W
- Campus: 97 acres in semi-urban location of the Shenandoah Valley
- Website: www.emu.edu/cjp

Center for Justice and Peacebuilding (CJP) is an accredited graduate-level program founded in 1994. It also offers non-credit training. The program specializes in conflict transformation, restorative justice, trauma healing, equitable development, and addressing organizational conflict. CJP is housed at Eastern Mennonite University (EMU) in Harrisonburg, Virginia, which describes itself as "a leader among faith-based universities" in emphasizing "peacebuilding, creation care, experiential learning, and cross-cultural engagement." One of the three 2011 Nobel Peace Laureates, Leymah Gbowee of Liberia, earned a master's degree in conflict transformation from CJP in 2007.

== History ==
The Center for Justice and Peacebuilding (CJP) is anchored in two currents within the Mennonite stream of Christianity:

1. Its tradition of helping people suffering from violent conflict or natural calamities, regardless of their religion or ethnicity
2. Its renunciation of all forms of violence

=== Relieving Suffering ===
The founding of the Center for Justice and Peacebuilding grew in part out of the work of the Mennonite Central Committee (MCC). Founded in 1920 to aid fellow Mennonites and others in Russia and Ukraine, the organization developed a global reputation for providing assistance after natural and man-made disasters by the mid-1970s usually operating under MCC's Mennonite Disaster Service, founded in 1950.

=== Nonviolence, Peace, and Justice ===
By the late 1970s and early 1980s, MCC started work on establishing a better training program focusing on the peace and justice fields at a systematic level. This was addressed first by founding the Office on Crime and Justice, with renowned restorative justice expert Howard Zehr as its first director. This office had the goal of moving the justice system away from retributive punishments toward processes that would help heal those harmed and restore communities. Zehr began the first victim/offender conferencing program in the United States during this period. Two years later, MCC founded Mennonite Conciliation Service (MCS) with Ron Kraybill as its first director. The mission of this organization was to encourage Mennonites and others to pursue peaceful resolution of conflicts. These two offices later were integrated into MCC's Office of Justice and Peacebuilding. Kraybill left MCS in 1989 to pursue a Ph.D. and was replaced by John Paul Lederach. The tenure of Kraybill and Lederach overlapped a bit, allowing them opportunity to develop a shared vision for a new kind of peace studies program in the world of higher education. Kraybill later recalled those early conversations:

We wanted a good mix of academics via theory conceptualization, but with practice in the real world. I don’t think we were necessarily thinking of a master’s program, just some kind of situation where teaching and practice went together. Another strong desire was to work in a team with others for an institution where a faith-based perspective was valued. We were wary of desire for individual prestige and wanted to work in a setting where individuals were more committed to an institutional mission than to going to the highest ladder of individual success.

The work of MCS in the late 1980s also coincided with the development of Christian Peacemaker Teams a joint effort by the two largest North American Mennonite denominations and the Church of the Brethren. Founded after a Mennonite World Conference keynote address by Ronald J. Sider author of the bestselling Rich Christians in an Age of Hunger (published and republished in 1977, 1997, 2005) in which he said,

We must be prepared to die by the thousands. Those who believed in peace through the sword have not hesitated to die. Proudly, courageously, they gave their lives. Again and again, they sacrificed bright futures to the tragic illusion that one more righteous crusade would bring peace in their time, and they laid down their lives by the millions. Unless we . . . are ready to start to die by the thousands in dramatic vigorous new exploits for peace and justice, we should sadly confess that we never really meant what we said, and we dare never whisper another word about pacifism to our sisters and brothers in those desperate lands filled with injustice. Unless we are ready to die developing new nonviolent attempts to reduce conflict, we should confess that we never really meant that the cross was an alternative to the sword.

=== Founding ===
In 1990, Eastern Mennonite College (EMC) hired John Paul Lederach to teach sociology and international conciliation. He continued to head MCC's conciliation work, including training MCC workers prior to their international assignments. During this time he was consulting in a number of conflicts, in the Basque region of Spain, Colombia, the Philippines, and Northern Ireland among others. After an exhausting trip Lederach began talking to Mennonite opinion-leaders and conflict workers including Hizkias Assefa, Kraybill, and others about systematically educating people to do the kind of work he was doing. A pair of retired educators, James and Marian Payne (both EMU alumni), stepped forward when they learned of the hope of a center devoted to peace education at EMU. They guaranteed the funds necessary to support CJP for its first year of existence, plus made CJP the beneficiary of their estate. The Paynes made an initial donation of $25,000 (by 2007, their donations totaled more than $500,000.) CJP began in the fall of the 1994-95 academic year with two masters-level students: Jonathan Bartsch, an American who had studied and worked in the Middle East for almost three years and who spoke Arabic, and Jim Hershberger, an American who had spent eight years with Mennonite Central Committee in war-torn Nicaragua and was fluent in Spanish. They started their studies a year before accreditation of the program was granted. They were joined in the spring semester of 1995 by Moe Kyaw Tun, who had been involved with the resistance movement in Myanmar (Burma) before fleeing to Thailand. In establishing CJP, its founders said they sought to build on the lessons learned by MCC and other Mennonites in the peace arena. Five recurring characteristics of these lessons referenced by scholars are:

1. Humility: Instead of playing the role of "educated professional telling social subordinates how to do things," anthropologist Sally Engle Merry wrote that Mennonites tend toward "listening, being creative and innovative, remaining vulnerable, making space for others to take control over their lives."
2. Openness to personal change: Rabbi and scholar Marc Gopin wrote: "The Mennonite intervener is prepared to go through a spiritual transformation... [I]t seems quite clear that ethical traits, such as gratitude, an eagerness to learn from others, an openness to positive change, and generosity are all critical to Mennonite conflict transformation."
3. Long-term commitment: Dr. Sally Engle Merry wrote that a distinctive feature of Mennonite-style peace work is "commitment to long-term involvement in the conflict situation. This is related to the emphasis on learning the languages and culture, on developing workshops and trainings out of local languages and practices, on building relationships and serving as bridges, all of which require an investment of time."
4. Community: The reliance on community "is a vital component of who they are and also something the field of conflict resolution in general may be able to learn from them." Mennonites tend to focus most of their efforts at engaging with ordinary people at the grassroots, compared with those at the top of a social or political hierarchy.
5. Non-violent stance: As one might expect, CJP-trained people cite Jesus and Martin Luther King Jr. as role models, but they also reference such figures as Mahatma Gandhi (Hindu), Khan Abdul Ghaffar Khan (Muslim), and Thich Nhat Hanh (Buddhist).

Both Sally Engle Merry, who is a Quaker, and Marc Gopin, who is Jewish, say that the Mennonites’ "brand" of Christianity appears to play a crucial role in enabling them and those they train to persist at working at deep, intractable conflicts over many years.

=== CJP’s niche ===
The directory of the Consortium on Peace Education, Research and Development lists over 40 colleges and universities in the United States offering both undergraduate and graduate programs in peace studies, but these programs varied widely. Many focused on "dispute resolution," often viewed through a legal or business-management lens. Others centered on research into war, peace and security issues, often staffed and backed by people who viewed the military as an acceptable vehicle for arriving at peace, or at least for suppressing open hostilities. Since its inception, CJP has been aimed at persons with cross-cultural or extensive domestic experience who were already working in conflict resolution, humanitarian assistance, development, or social justice. As urged by founding director John Paul Lederach, CJP has sought to avoid imposing North American models on conflict resolution on the rest of the world; instead it advocates strategies suggested by "cues and patterns elicited by the culture in question," preferably by people intimately connected to that culture. As part of their graduation requirements, students are expected to test their new understandings through doing "reflective practice" (also called an "internship" or "practicum").

== CJP Programs ==
CPJ's academic and training concentrations are:

- strategic peacebuilding
- restorative justice and peacebuilding
- psychosocial trauma and peacebuilding
- development and peacebuilding
- organizational leadership and peacebuilding

=== Master's of Arts in Education ===
The Master's program offers a graduate degree in conflict transformation and restorative justice.

CJP requires a final comprehensive exam for master's degree candidates. The exam is intended to assess these "core competencies": presentation skills; case analysis; self-management; self-care; teambuilding/role-playing; interpersonal relational skills; understanding peacebuilding theories, including conflict transformation, restorative justice and trauma healing; research and interview skills; reflective practice; cultural competency; ethical issues; social change theories; and other specific practice skills and concepts, such as principled negotiation.

=== Summer Peacebuilding Institute ===
Each Summer Peacebuilding Institute has four successive sessions; the first starts in early May and the last finishes in late June. Courses vary but can include faith-based peacebuilding, monitoring and evaluation, organizational leadership, playback theater, conflict analysis, program and project management, and reconciliation and restorative justice.

Five CJP-published booklets, issued in 2007, 2008, 2009, 2010 and 2011, contain portrait-photos and reflections of some of the participants in that year's SPI. Predictably, many students comment on having learned much from their courses and fellow students. However, the SPI participants also refer to having fun. Babu Ayindo, a 1998 master's degree graduate from Kenya who returned to teach in SPI 2011, said: "Through song, dance, poetry, and music, people are finding another language to transcend the conflicts that they are experiencing."

Several notable alumni of the program have earned their degrees primarily, or exclusively through the SPI program. Nobel Peace Laureate Leymah Gbowee started formal training in peacebuilding by attending a session of SPI, as did three of her close colleagues in West Africa: Liberian Sam Gbaydee Doe, who attended in the late 1990s while earning his master's degree (’98); Nigerian Thelma Ekiyor, who attended in 2002; and Liberian Lutheran pastor Reverend "BB" Colley, who attended in 2000 and 2001. Farida Aziz, the Afghan peace and women's rights activist, took three courses in SPI in 1999 and returned in 2003 for a fourth course. The eight EMU alumni from six countries of the 1,000 nominated by the Switzerland-based committee for the 2005 Nobel Peace Prize received training at EMU, predominantly through SPI. Future President of Somalia Hassan Sheikh Mohamud also attended the SPI in 2001 and has emphasized the importance of the program's philosophy in his work.

The SPI has 3,191 alumni from 119 countries, as of December 2008.

=== STAR (Strategies for Trauma Awareness and Resilience) ===
Strategies for Trauma Awareness and Resilience — usually called STAR — is a program that was launched at EMU in response to the events of 9/11. "STAR’s mission is to strengthen the capacity of leaders and organizations to address trauma, break cycles of violence and build resilience at the individual, community and societal levels." STAR consists of a foundational five-day training seminar and STAR specialty trainings. STAR was made possible by nearly $1 million in grant money in 2002 (renewed in 2003 with another $1 million) from Church World Service to give a series of "seminars in trauma awareness and recovery" to hundreds of people from New York City following the 9/11 attacks.

These seminars have gone far beyond their original NYC clientele. More than 7,000 people have taken STAR over the last decade, though not always in the same format. STAR has been adapted to particular audiences. There is, for instance, a STAR for "adults who want practical skills to work with youth in addressing trauma, resolving conflict and preventing violence. It has been piloted in Palestine, Kenya, New Orleans and Northern Ireland. It is part of the curriculum in 57 high schools in Nairobi, Kenya" Other variations are used for war veterans and for dealing with the continuing effects of historical harms, such as slavery.

== Work of alumni ==
As of September 2015, 539 people have earned a master's degree (42 to 45 semester hours) or graduate certificate (15 semester hours) in conflict transformation from CJP. 78 Fulbright Scholars have participated in trainings. CJP alumni represent 51 countries as of December 2010.

=== Notable alumni ===
- Jonathan Bartsch, MA '97, CEO of CDR (Collaborative Decision Resources), the oldest mediation and facilitation organization in the United States
- Sandra Dunsmore, Graduate Certificate, - Director, Grant Making Support Group for the Open Society
- Babu Ayindo, MA '98, consultant on peacebuilding in Africa since the late 1990s, employed by multiple foundations and agencies for work in 11 countries and teaching at eight peacebuilding institutes in six countries.
- Sam Gbaydee Doe, MA '98, PhD (University of Bradford), co-founder and first executive director of West African Network for Peacebulding (www.wanep.org/wanep/), advisor to the United Nations on development and reconciliation.
- Jan Jenner, MA ’99, director of the Practice & Training Institute at EMU and author of two books on peacebuilding.
- Tammy Krause, MA ’99, founding director of JustBridges, a U.S. group representing the needs of victims, working across barriers between prosecuting and defense lawyers, winner of Soros Justice Fellowship and Ashoka Fellowship.
- Alfiado Zunguza, MA '99, founder and executive director of JustaPaz, the principal peace organization of the Portuguese-speaking world.
- Akum Longchari, MA '00, co-founder and director of The Morung Express newspaper in Nagaland (India) who is a main player in peace efforts between minority population in Nagaland and the central government of India.
- Krista Rigalo, MA '00, U.S. Peace Corps chief of programming and training for Africa.
- Hassan Sheikh Mohamud, President of Somalia
- Emmanuel Bombande, MA '02, co-founder and executive director of West African Network for Peace (www.wanep.org/wanep/), awarded the Millennium Excellence Peace Award in Ghana in 2005.
- Joseph G. Campbell, MA '02, received Order of the British Empire from Queen Elizabeth II in 1997 for his peace efforts in Northern Ireland.
- Ameet Sharma Dhakal, MA’02, former founder and editor-in-chief of República, an English language daily published in Kathmandu, current founder and editor of setopati.com.
- Ali Gohar, MA '02, co-founder and director of JustPeace International (http://www.justpeaceint.org), working extensively in Pakistan, merging restorative justice principles with traditional jirga processes.
- Claudia Henning, Graduate Certificate '02, recipient of 2006 award from International Association of Chiefs of Police for restorative justice work with juveniles.
- Dev Anand Ramiah, MA ’02, Portfolio Adviser and Team Leader for Asia and the Pacific Bureau for Crisis Prevention and Recovery, United Nations Development Programme
- Manjrika Sewak, MA’02, senior program officer at WISCOMP (Women in Security, Conflict Management and Peace) in New Delhi, a peace-building initiative of the Foundation for Universal Responsibility of His Holiness the Dalai Lama.
- Anjana Shakya, MA '02, founder and chairperson of Himalayan Human Rights Monitors (www.himrights.org) and executive coordinator of Beyond Beijing Committee (www.beyondbeijing.org/).
- Ruth Zimmerman, MA ’02, World Vision country program manager for India, former co-director of CJP.
- Farida Aziz, MA ’03, Afghani peace activist
- Jae Young Lee, MA '03, founding director of the Northeast Asia Regional Peacebuilding Institute, networking and educating peace workers on the Korean Peninsula, Japan, and China.
- Tecla Namachanja Wanjala, MA '03, Acting Chair of the Truth, Justice and Reconciliation Commission of Kenya
- Husam Naji Jubran, MA ’04, trainer of thousands of non-violent activists concerned with the future of Palestinians and leader of non-violent actions to protest the situation in the West Bank and the treatment of Palestinians generally.
- Jebiwot Sumbeiywo, MA ’04, chief of party, Peace Initiative Kenya.
- Iris de León-Hartshorn, MA ’05, director for Transformative Peacemaking, a cabinet-level position with the Mennonite Church (USA).
- John Katunga, MA '05, Regional Technical Advisor for Peacebuilding and Justice in the East Africa Region for Catholic Relief Services in East Africa.
- Arieta Koila Olsson, MA '05, co-founder and director of the Pacific Center for Peacebuilding, based in Fiji.
- Fred Yiga, MA ’06, Police Commissioner for the United Nations Mission in South Sudan.
- Nuria Abdullah Abd - Women's leader at Interpeace based in the regional office in Nairobi, Kenya.
- Leymah Gbowee, MA ’07, 2011 Nobel Peace Prize Laureate, founder of Women in Peacebuilding Network
- Nilofar Sakhi, MA '07, chief executive at International Center for Afghan Women's Economic Development at the American University of Afghanistan.
- Carol Grosman, MA '08, director of Jerusalem Stories (www.jerusalemstories.org).
- Saeed Murad Rahi, MA '07, rule of law expert, USAID program in Afghanistan.
- Dr. Michelle Tooley, SPI '03-'08, The Eli Lilly Professor of Religion at Berea College, Kentucky and 1 of 3 finalists for the 2014 Thomas Ehrlich Civically Engaged Faculty Award.

In 2001, incumbent President of Somalia Hassan Sheikh Mohamud completed three of the SPI's intensive courses, studying mediation, trauma healing, and designing learner-centered trainings. Mohamud would go on to found the Peace and Development Party (PDP) and co-establish the Somali Institute of Management and Administration (SIMAD).

=== Organizations Founded by Alumni ===
People who were affiliated with CJP (or SPI), as students or teachers, in earlier years have gone on to found peacebuilding organizations or programs in a dozen countries.

- West African Network for Peacebuilding (Ghana)
- Bridgebuilder (U.K)
- Henry Martyn Institute (India)
- Just Peace (Afghanistan)
- Korea Peacebuilding Institute
- African Peacebuilding Institute at the Mindolo Ecumenical Peace Foundation (Zambia)
- JustaPaz (Mozambique)
- Pacific Centre for Peacebuilding (Fiji)
- Mindanao Peacebuilding Institute (Philippines)
- Northeast Asia Regional Peacebuilding Institute (South Korea)
- Canadian School of Peacebuilding (Winnipeg, Canada)
- Peace Academy in Sarajevo (Bosnia-Herzegovina)
- Summer Peacebuilding & Development Institute at American University (Washington D.C.)
