= Pushpi Weerakoon =

- Born: Ratnapura, Sri Lanka
- Occupations: Peacebuilder; conflict resolution specialist; community development practitioner

Pushpi Weerakoon is a Sri Lankan social activist, who works in the fields of peacebuilding, conflict resolution, transitional justice, social cohesion, restorative justice, and gender empowerment. She received Rotary International's Rotary Alumni Global Service Award in 2025.

== Early life and education ==
Weerakoon was educated at St. Bridget's Convent, Colombo. She later studied law at the University of Buckingham in the United Kingdom. She attended Chulalongkorn University in Thailand as a Rotary Peace Fellow in 2007.

She completed an M.A. in Conflict Transformation (2010) at the Center for Justice and Peacebuilding (CJP), Eastern Mennonite University (EMU), United States, through a Rotary Ambassadorial Scholarship. She participated in a symposium on restorative justice at Harvard Law School in 2015.

Weerakoon later completed a Master of Public Administration at the Harvard Kennedy School and an MBA from the University of Wales. As of 2025, she is a doctoral candidate in Peace and Conflict Studies at the University for Peace in Costa Rica.

== Career ==
Early in her career, Weerakoon was involved with Sri Lanka's reconciliation initiatives following the civil conflict, and coordinated programs promoting mediation, dialogue and social cohesion.

She later worked at the International Organization for Migration (IOM), where she was involved in establishing the social cohesion and reconciliation unit for the Sri Lanka mission, and had postings in Iraq, Bangladesh, Geneva, The Bahamas, El Salvador, Central America, Haiti, the Marshall Islands, Micronesia, Palau, Pacific islands and Pakistan.

On 24 June 2025, she received Rotary International's Rotary Alumni Global Service Award 2025 at the Rotary International Convention in Calgary, Canada, and delivered a speech. She was reported to be the first Sri Lankan recipient of this award.

== Awards and recognition ==
- Rotary Alumni Global Service Award (2025) — presented during the Rotary International Convention in Calgary; Rotary and Sri Lankan media report her as the first Sri Lankan to receive the award.
- National peace recognition (2011/2012, Sri Lanka) — local coverage notes a Rotary-related national peace award for humanitarian service.
