= Kate Baer =

American poet

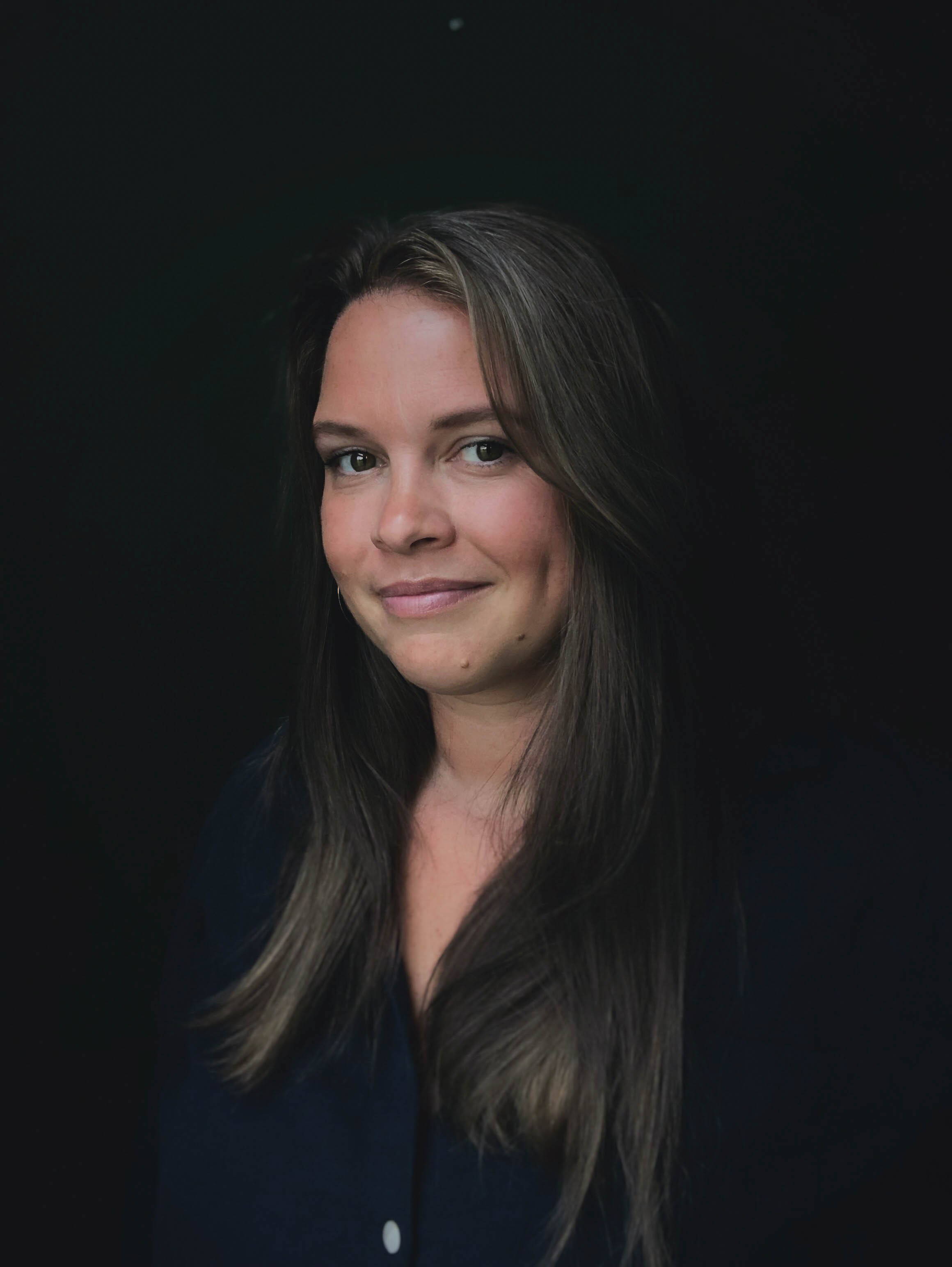
- Baer in 2021
- Education: Eastern Mennonite University
- Occupation: Poet
- Spouse: Austin
- Children: 4
- Writing career
- Language: English
- Years active: 2020-Present
- Notable works: What Kind of Woman; I Hope This Finds You Well ""How About Now"
- Website: www.katebaer.com

Kate Baer is an American writer and poet who currently lives in Lancaster, Pennsylvania. Her writing describes a range of topics, including motherhood, love, and loss.

== Early life and education ==
Baer grew up outside of Philadelphia, the daughter of an elementary school teacher and a meatpacking plant worker-turned-Christian radio host. She learned about poetry as she majored in English at Eastern Mennonite University. She dropped out of an MFA graduate program when she was pregnant. Her favorite writer is Margaret Atwood.

== Publications ==
Her first piece of paid writing was a book of poetry entitled What Kind of Woman. The book was published in 2020, and topped the New York Times Best Seller list.

In 2020 she started to write poetry for her second book. Leveraging the style of erasure poetry, Baer turned messages and hate mail she received via social media into poems. The poems that resulted were published as a second collection titled I Hope This Finds You Well in 2021.

Baer's third poetry collection, And Yet: Poems, was published on 8 November 2022. Like the previous collections, And Yet: Poems, was a New York Times Best Seller. Her fourth book, How About Now, was published in November 2025.
