= Shannon W. Dycus =

American academic administrator

President of Eastern Mennonite University
- Incumbent
- Assumed office July 1, 2026

Personal details
- Education: Butler University; Christian Theological Seminary; United Theological Seminary of the Twin Cities

Shannon W. Dycus is a U.S. reverend and academic administrator serving as president of Eastern Mennonite University since 2025.

== Life ==
Dycus earned a B.S. in middle and secondary education from Butler University. She completed a M.Div. at Christian Theological Seminary and a D.Min. in public theology at United Theological Seminary of the Twin Cities.

Dycus was an academic advisor and adjunct faculty member at Franklin College and was a co-pastor at First Mennonite Church of Indianapolis. She joined Eastern Mennonite University where she served as dean of students from 2019 to 2023 and as vice president of student affairs and dean of students from 2023 to 2024. In 2024, Dycus was promoted to vice president for student affairs, equity and belonging. In July 2025, she became its interim president and was formally named to the role on July 1, 2026. She is the first Black woman to serve in the role.
