= Truth, Justice and Reconciliation Commission of Kenya =

Organisation in Kenya

Kenya's Truth, Justice and Reconciliation Commission (TJRC) was established in 2008. Kenya's modern history has been marked not only by liberation struggles but also by ethnic conflicts, semi-despotic regimes, marginalization and political violence, including the 1982 attempted coup d'état, the Shifta War, and the 2007 post-election violence.

The toll of the 2007 post-election violence was approximately 1,500 deaths, 3,000 rapes, and 300,000 people left internally displaced. The most severe episode of this conflict unfolded over 59 days between Election Day, 27 December 2007 and 28 February 2008. A political compromise was reached that saw the two conflicting parties sign a National Accord, following the mediation efforts by the African Union Panel of Eminent African Personalities chaired by former United Nations Secretary-General Kofi Annan.

== Background ==
Despite the reputation of the Rift valley as the cradle of humanity and positive co-existence, the peoples living there suffered through mass human rights violations in the later part of the 20th century. The mass violence in Kenya occurred throughout a period of over 40 years making it difficult to define concretely as post-election violence. To understand the events following the 1992 and 2007 elections in Kenya, one must first understand the complicated ethnic makeup of the Kenyan state. The two tribes primarily involved in the political violence are the Kikuyu people (22 percent of the 2008 Kenyan population) and the Kalenjin people (12 percent of the 2008 Kenyan population), however many other smaller tribes also inhabit Kenya. These ethnic tensions originate in events occurring before independence when British colonists forced the Kalenjin pastoral tribe off their land to develop the Rift Valley agriculturally. With the colonists came Kikuyu farmers to work as sharecroppers in the British fields. Continued competition for economic wealth and power also drove the two tribes apart.

Later when selecting government officials after independence in 1963, the tension between these two tribes increased as Jomo Kenyatta, a Kikuyu, became president and Daniel Moi, a Kalenjin, became vice-president. After Kenyatta's death, Moi took power and tightened his hold on Kenya through censoring and human rights violations. In 1991 a constitutional reform passed allowing for multipartyism in Kenya. Shortly after in 1992 the first multi-party election since independence took place. Moi won the elections but many doubted the legitimacy of his victory. Violence ensued as Kalenjin supporters of Moi raped, killed, and displaced Kikuyu opposition supporters. Despite Kalenjin attacks on Kikuyu making up the majority of the ethnic violence in Kenya, ethnic conflicts between tribes remained much more complicated. This violence persisted long after the 1992 election with postelection violence reports in 1998, 2002, and 2007. Similar to the 1992 election, in December 2007 incumbent president Mwai Kibaki won an election called “deeply flawed” by observers. The Kalenjin, who supported the opposition leader Raila Odinga, burned down the houses and hacked to death Kikuyus who supported Kibaki. Weeks after the election, Kikuyus violently took revenge forcing other ethnic groups out of Kikuyu dominated areas. This post election violence took the lives of over 800 people and displaced at least 300,000.

=== 1992 Post-election violence ===
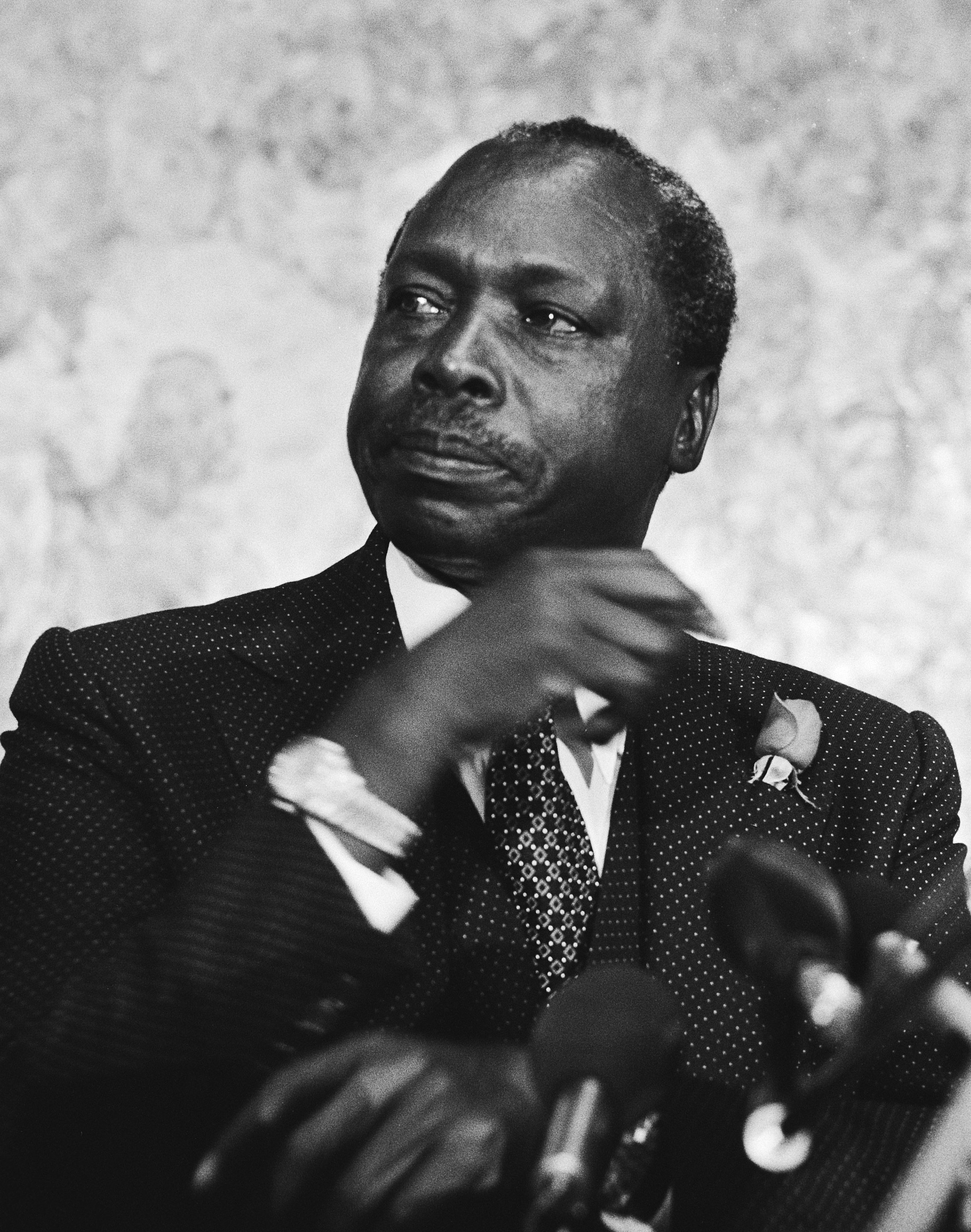
President Daniel Arap Moi in 1979

The 1992 multiparty general elections were riddled with irregularities with some opposition candidates even being physically prevented from presenting their nomination papers. The incumbent, President Daniel Arap Moi, campaigned freely all over the country while other party leaders could not. Where the opposition could not campaign freely, President Moi traversed the country using government resources. Moreover, he enjoyed a monopoly of media coverage from the official broadcaster, the Kenya Broadcasting Corporation (KBC). In addition, the Electoral Commission was made up of presidential appointees whose loyalty to the incumbent was never in doubt. The most notorious instance of interference with the electoral process was the 1988 General Elections where many losing candidates were declared winners. The then sole ruling party, KANU, had already secured the monopoly for political power through a constitutional amendment in 1982 that made it the sole political party. In the 1991 clashes, non-Kalenjin and non-Maasai ethnic groups were "attacked, their houses set on fire, their properties looted and in certain instances, some of them were killed or severely injured with traditional weapons like bows and arrows, spears, pangas, swords and clubs". In its investigations, witnesses told the Kenya National Commission on Human Rights (KNCHR) that violent clashes between the Kalenjin, on the one hand, and the Kikuyu and Kisii on the other, began in 1992. These clashes pitted these groups along ethnic lines as well as on political lines. In 1992, the Kalenjin were overwhelmingly members of the then ruling party, the Kenya African National Union, (KANU). President Daniel Arap Moi, a member of the Kalenjin community, was the President of KANU and the country. He was opposed to the introduction of multi-party politics in the country and the existence of opposition political parties particularly in the Rift Valley. Many non-Kalenjin and non-Maasai communities in the Rift Valley supported the then budding opposition parties. The Akiwumi report on the 1992 clashes reported that the provincial administration was partisan in its support of the then KANU government and against those considered to be opposed to KANU in the Rift Valley. In 1992 the provincial administration also showed open partisanship in favour of KANU.

=== 1997 Post-election violence ===
Kenyan Coat of Arms

In December 1997, Kenyans went to the polls to elect members of parliament and the country's president. The elections were conducted in the glare of international publicity, not least because the international community was seriously concerned about whether the elections would be free and fair. Despite evidence of electoral irregularities, political violence and a legal framework which favoured the incumbent government, observers of the elections endorsed the resulting victory of President Moi and the Kenya African National Union (KANU) as being an expression of the will of the people.

In the wake of the elections, there rapidly followed a waning of international interest in political developments in Kenya. This was despite the fact that within a month of the elections, politically motivated ethnic "clashes" erupted in Rift Valley Province. The violence left hundreds of people dead or injured, and thousands of others displaced from their homes and living in makeshift shelters. It was clear that this violence was following a pattern similar to that encountered during previous outbreaks of conflict in Kenya between 1991 and 1994 – prior to and after the country's first multi-party elections in 1992— in which predominantly Kalenjin supporters of KANU attacked members of ostensibly ‘pro-opposition’ ethnic groups. The important difference between then and now was that for the first time, members of a ‘pro-opposition’ ethnic group, the Kikuyus, were organising and actively fighting back.

Although the 1997 elections passed off with less violence than had been the case in 1992, events in January 1998 put paid to any hopes that political violence might be a thing of the past in Kenya. On the night of 11 January 1998, some members of the Pokot and Samburu ethnic groups raided the home of a Kikuyu widow at a place called Mirgwit in the Laikipia District of the Rift Valley Province. The raiders raped the woman and stole some livestock from the household. A group of Kikuyu men followed the raiders but, having failed to catch up with them, entered a Samburu compound where, in retaliation, they mutilated livestock that they found there. Mutilation of livestock is highly taboo for pastoralists such as the Samburu and Pokot. Accordingly, it was almost inevitable that there would be some kind of response by the owners of the livestock.

On the night of 13 January 1998, some Pokot and Samburu men attacked Kikuyu communities in the Magande, Survey, Motala, Milimani and Mirgwit areas of Ol Moran in Laikipia. It appears that the attackers were armed not only with spears, bows and arrows, but also with guns. It was claimed that some of the attackers were dressed in military-type clothing. It has been estimated that over 50 Kikuyus were killed during these attacks and over 1000 others fled the area and sought refuge at the Roman Catholic Church at Kinamba, from where they were later relocated to temporary shelters at Sipili and Ol Moran. On 21 January, about 70 unidentified people invaded three farms in Njoro including one belonging to the newly elected DP Member of Parliament for Molo Constituency, Kihika Kimani. Three days later, groups of what local residents described as Kalenjins attacked Kikuyus in parts of Njoro in the same constituency. There were varying explanations given for these attacks. One version of events blamed them on the refusal of local Kikuyu traders to supply goods and services to Kalenjins in response to the events in Laikipia. Another suggested that this was simply an unprovoked attack on Kikuyus by local Kalenjin youths. The attack on Kikuyus on 24 January provoked a counter-attack by a group of apparently wellorganised Kikuyus, who on 25 January attacked Kalenjin residents of Naishi/Lare in Njoro.

According to police reports, 34 Kikuyus and 48 Kalenjins were killed during these initial attacks and over 200 houses were burnt down. Hundreds of people from both communities were displaced by the fighting, and many of them fled to temporary 'camps' at Kigonor, Sururu, Larmudiac mission and Mauche. During its visit to Kenya the joint mission witnessed the very poor conditions in which displaced people in these camps were living. Sporadic fighting continued during February and March 1998. By 11 March, police reports were estimating that at least 127 people had been killed since the 'clashes' had begun in January.

=== 2007 Post-election violence ===
Whereas between 1992 and 2002 most election related violence occurred during the pre-election phase at the time of voter registration, party campaigns and nominations, the 2007 elections were characterised by excessive violence, and crimes against humanity, especially after the declaration of Mwai Kibaki of the Party of National Unity (PNU) as president in the contested results. The 2007–08 post-election violence shook the nation because of its spread, speed and ruthlessness. The closely contested presidential election was characterised by unrealistic promises, fragmentation, balkanisation, media hype and strong expressions of ethnic nationalism. Inspired and propelled by the rejection of the 2005 Referendum on a government sponsored constitution, the main opposition party went full throttle to wrest power form the incumbent in the general elections.

The 2007–2008 Kenyan crisis refers to a political, economic, and humanitarian crisis that erupted in Kenya after incumbent President Mwai Kibaki was declared the winner of the presidential election held on 27 December 2007. Supporters of Kibaki's opponent, Raila Odinga of the Orange Democratic Movement, alleged electoral manipulation. This was widely confirmed by international observers, perpetrated by both parties in the election.

In part due to the ethnic and geographic diversity of the ODM coalition, no one narrative can explain the reaction of opposition supporters to the announcement of Kibaki's swearing-in. In addition to staging several nonviolent protests, opposition supporters went on a violent rampage in several parts of the country, most noticeably in Odinga's homeland of Nyanza Province and the slums of Nairobi, part of his Langata constituency. Police shot a number of demonstrators, including a few in front of TV news cameras, causing more violence directed toward the police.

Targeted ethnic violence (as opposed to violent protests) escalated and at first was directed mainly against Kikuyu people – the community of which Kibaki is a member – living outside their traditional settlement areas, especially in the Rift Valley Province. This violence peaked with the killing of over 30 unarmed civilians in a church near Eldoret on New Years Day. Tensions in the Rift Valley have caused violence in several previous Kenyan elections, most notably in the 1992 Kenyan Elections. Some of the Kikuyu also engaged in retaliatory violence against groups supportive of Odinga, primarily Luos and Kalenjin, especially in the areas surrounding Nakuru and Naivasha.

In Mombasa, Muslim Kenyans took to the streets to protest the electoral manipulations and air their own grievances, though ethnic tensions played much less of a role in these protests. Looters also struck a number of stores in Mombasa. The slums of Nairobi saw some of the worst violence, some of this ethnically motivated attacks, some simple outrage at extreme poverty, and some the actions of criminal gangs. The violence continued sporadically for several months, particularly in the Rift Valley.

Former UN Secretary-General Kofi Annan arrived in the country nearly a month after the election, and successfully brought the two sides to the negotiating table. On 28 February 2008, Kibaki and Odinga signed a power-sharing agreement called the National Accord and Reconciliation Act, which establishes the office of prime minister and creates a coalition government.[1] The power-sharing Cabinet, headed by Odinga as Prime Minister, was eventually named on 13 April, after lengthy negotiations over its composition; it was sworn in on 17 April.

== The National Accord ==
The two parties agreed to tackle four main agenda items to end the political crisis and address its underlying causes.

- Agenda Item 1: Immediate Action to Stop Violence and Restore Fundamental Rights.
- Agenda Item 2: Addressing the Humanitarian Crisis, and Promoting Healing and Reconciliation.
- Agenda Item 3: How to Overcome the Political Crisis (power sharing).
- Agenda Item 4: Tackling Long-term Issues.

== The TJRC ==
The Truth, Justice and Reconciliation Commission (TJRC) is part of the accountability component of Agenda Four of the National Accord signed in 2008. By addressing the cause and effects of historical injustices and gross violations of human rights the TJRC will contribute towards national unity, reconciliation, and healing. The Commission is established by an Act of Parliament (Truth Justice and Reconciliation Commission Act no. 6 of 2008) to investigate the gross human rights violations and other historical injustices in Kenya between 12 December 1963 and 28 February 2008.

Agenda Four of the National Dialogue and Reconciliation process of 2008 that relates to long term issues and reforms provides the framework for transitional justice, with the Truth, Justice and Reconciliation Commission driving the transitional justice agenda.

Kenya's civil society have called for a truth, justice, and reconciliation process since 2002 when the NARC Government came into power after the twenty four-year rule of President Moi. In 2003, a Government appointed Task Force recommended establishment of a Truth Justice and reconciliation Commission. Had this recommendation been acted on then, perhaps the country might have avoided the post December 2007 election violence witnessed.

== Mandate of the TJRC ==
The Truth, Justice, and Reconciliation Commission has the ability to investigate, analyse, and report on what happened between 1963 and 2008 in regards to gross violations of human rights, economic crimes, illegal acquisition of public land, marginalisation of communities, ethnic violence, the context in which the crimes occurred, and educate the public about its work. The TJRC does not, however, have the power to prosecute. They can recommend prosecutions, reparations for victims, institutional changes, and amnesty in exchange for truth for perpetrators who did not commit gross human rights violations.

The TJRC investigates, analyses, and reports on human rights abuses, economic crimes, illegal acquisition of land, marginalisation of communities, and ethnic violence. In terms of justice, lack of retributive justice has been a source of concern for many Kenyans. Though the commission can recommend prosecutions, there has been a long-standing culture of impunity in the country, which threatens to keep political leaders safe from prosecution. However, the commission has focused on justice in terms of recognition and distribution. The commission has sought to give victims and perpetrators equal voice in hearings, and have included hearings where children may share their stories, with guidance from counselors. Recommendations for redistribution of power and resources has been a focus of the mandate, as major conflicts have arisen due to imbalances in power, land, and resources between ethnic groups. Additionally, the commission has focused on educating the country about the history of violence, and emphasises promoting reconciliation through revealing of truth.

The public is invited and encouraged to participate to fulfill the goal of educating the public. Members of the public may attend the public hearings, and can volunteer to assist the TJRC in fulfilling its mandate. They may also make submissions to the commission regarding the TJRC mandate. Victims may apply for reparations if they qualify.

=== Objectives ===
In its work the Commission will pursue the following goals and objectives:

- Truth: by establishing an accurate, complete and historical record of human rights violations and historical injustices, and educating the public
- Justice: Criminal justice, restorative justice, social justice through recommendations for prosecution, amnesty, reparations
- Peace and National Unity
- Healing and Reconciliation (national and individual)
- Restoration of the human dignity of victims and perpetrators.

Specific objectives for investigating human rights abuses:

- To establish an accurate, complete and historical record of violations and abuses of human rights, committed between 12 December 1963 and 28 February 2008, such as:
- Abductions, disappearances, detentions, torture, murder, massacres, extrajudicial killings, crimes of sexual nature against female victims and expropriation of property suffered by any person.
- To investigate the gross violations of international human rights law and determine those responsible for their commission.
- To investigate and provide redress of crimes of sexual nature against female victims.
- To investigate the context, causes and circumstances under which the gross violations of human rights occurred.
- To identify actors who purported to have acted on behalf of any public body responsible for the gross violations of human rights, and persons who should be prosecuted for being responsible.
- To identify and specify the victims of the gross violations of human rights and their whereabouts.
- To facilitate the granting of conditional amnesty to persons who make full disclosure of all the relevant facts, relating to the gross violations of human rights and economic crimes, and who comply with the requirements of the TJRC Act.

Specific Objectives for Investigating Economic/Public Land Crimes

- To investigate economic crimes including grand corruption and the exploitation of natural resources and the action taken, if any.
- To inquire into the irregular and illegal allocation of public land, in terms of repossession or determination of cases.
- To inquire into and establish the reality or otherwise of perceived economic marginalisation of communities.
- To inquire into misuse of public institutions for political objectives.
- To educate and engage the public and give sufficient publicity to the work of the Commission.

Specific objectives for the recommendation process

Make Recommendations in Response to Human Rights Abuses in Terms of:

- Reparation and rehabilitation policy or measures aimed at granting reparations and restoring the civil and human dignity of the victims.
- Prevention of violations and abuses of human rights through institutional, administrative and legislative measures.
- Granting of conditional amnesty to persons who make full disclosure.
- Prosecution of perpetrators or persons involved.
- Promotion of healing, reconciliation and coexistence among ethnic communities.

Make recommendations as to:

- The reforms and other measures needed to achieve the object of the Commission, and address any specific concern and actions to be taken.
- A mechanism or framework and an institutional arrangement in that connection, for the implementation of the recommendations of the Commission.
- The implementation of the reports of the relevant commissions of inquiry.
- Repossession or determination of cases relating to public land acquired through irregular and illegal allocation.
- Addressing the real or perceived economic marginalisation of communities.

For information visit TJRC Kenya website.

=== The Commissioners ===
The commissioners of the TJRC are both local and international, and there has been controversy regarding the legitimacy of the commission due to its commissioners. Some of the commissioners and people involved with the commission were involved with the previous government, and, consequently, people question the impartiality of the commission. Nevertheless, the commissioners offer different types of expertise that they can apply to Kenya's TJRC.

- Bethuel Kiplagat was the chairman of the commission. Originally, President Mwai Kibaki picked him to head the commission. However, Kiplagat later stepped down in November 2010 after being pressured to resign by fellow commissioners, civil society groups, human rights activists and the general public since he was part of a meeting of the Kenyan Intelligence Committee held less than forty eight hours prior to the security operation that resulted in the Wagalla massacre, which according to the UN was the worst massacre in Kenya's history. The TJRC investigated the massacre and made a finding that Kiplagat should be barred from further public offices and investigated for possible complicity in the massacre. It is the first time a truth commission has made a negative finding concerning its own Chairman. In addition to the Wagalla Massacre, the Commission investigated two additional violations to which Kiplagat was linked: the murder of Kenya's Foreign Minister, Robert Ouko (politician); Kiplagat was also accused of land grabbing while he acted as Permanent Secretary during former President Moi's regime. In April 2012, Kiplagat was reinstated as TJRC chairman after the Justice Minister Eugene Wamalwa brokered a truce between him and the other commissioners. Previously, Kiplagat worked with the National Christian Council of Kenya, served as an Ambassador to France, the High Commissioner to UK, and the Permanent Secretary in the Ministry of Foreign Affairs. Kiplagat was also the chair of the board of the African Medical and Research Foundation and worked with Kenya's Special Envoy to the Somalia peace process.
- Tecla Namachanja Wanjala acted as the chairperson in Kiplagat's absence, and she has been involved in peacemaking in Kenya during the 1991–92 and 1997 violence. She has participated in several different countries' conflict resolution processes, including Sudan, Rwanda and Ethiopia, and she headed the Regional Party for Peace in East and Central Africa Program, which seeks to increase African leadership in conflict management in the Horn of Africa. She trained 500 workers for the Nairobi Peace Initiative, consulted for Japan International Cooperation Agency, and journeyed with internally displaced persons in Kenya during the ethnic clashes of 1993–1995. She organised aid for over 40,000 survivors of the violence. She is from Kenya.
- Ahmed Sheikh Farah, a commissioner from Kenya, has worked internationally for the Kenya Armed Forces. He has experience in conflict prevention, management, and resolutions at both the regional and international levels.
- Berhanu Dinka, a commissioner from Ethiopia, has 27 years of experience working in the Ethiopian Foreign Service and in the United Nations. He also acted as an Ethiopian ambassador and headed the Department of Africa and Middle East Affairs in the Ministry of Foreign Affairs. After attaining the rank of Under Secretary-General in the UN, Commissioner Dinka represented the Secretary General during negotiations to resolve the conflict in DR Congo.
- Gertrude Chawatama, a commissioner from Zambia, has over 19 years of professional judicial experience. She is a judge with the High Court of Zambia, a board member of the Commonwealth Judicial Education Institute based in Canada, a council member of the Commonwealth Magistrates and Judges Association for the East, Central and Southern African region, and chairperson of the Juvenile Justice Forum in Zambia.
- Margaret Shava, a commissioner from Kenya, has worked in law, management, and peace-building for over 17 years. She is an advocate of the High Court of Kenya and has practised law with a leading law firm in Nairobi. Commissioner Shava has experience in the economic sectors, modern corporate and human resources management, and the UN. She also worked with national and international NGOs that specialise in human rights, governance, and international refugee law.
- Ronald Slye, a commissioner from the United States, is a professor of law at the Seattle University School of Law. He consults, writes, and teaches on public international law and international human rights law, and is a specialist in international criminal law and transitional justice. Commissioner Slye is the author of articles on international law, human rights, and environmental and poverty law, and he is the co-author of two books on international criminal law. He is writing a book on the South African Truth and Reconciliation Commission and its amnesty process, based on his time as one of the commission's legal consultants. He has published a book about his experience with the Kenyan Truth Commission: "The Kenyan TJRC: An Outsider's View from the Inside," published by Cambridge University Press. A companion website established at his University makes available the Commission's Final Report, the dissent filed by the international Commissioners, and transcripts of many of the public hearings held by the Commission. The website is: https://digitalcommons.law.seattleu.edu/tjrc/.
- Tom Ojienda, a commissioner from Kenya, is a former president of the East African Law Society, former chair of the Law Society of Kenya, and financial secretary and vice-president of the Pan-African Lawyers Union (PALU). He was a consultant for the Njonjo and Ndungu Land Commissions, World Bank, USAID, ACCORD and EAC, and served as a member of the Legal and Technical Working Group in the National Land Policy formulation process. Commissioner Ojienda has written two books on land law and edited two books on democracy and constitutional change.

=== Departments ===
The work of the TJRC is being accomplished through the work of seven different departments.

- The department of Finance & Administration provides support to the commission by organising the logistical and administrative aspects of the commission's budget and finances.
- The department of Communications acts as the link between the commission and the public. It provides information to the media and ensures that the Kenyan population has access to the commission's proceedings. The department of Communications maintains clarity in regard to the commission's mandate and processes, encourages the public, particularly those who have suffered from gross human rights violations, to participate in the commission, and facilitates national discourse.
- The Special Support Services Unit works with the specific experiences of vulnerable groups, such as women, children, and people with disabilities. It considers gender-based violations, ensures that witnesses can communicate in their chosen language, and focuses on the treatment of witness and their families.
- The department of Legal Affairs manages all of the commission's legal issues. It gives legal support and advice, organises the hearings, and provides support to the victims and witnesses in conjunction with the Special Services Unit.
- The department of Investigations collects, analyses, and provides the necessary evidence and information for the commission to run smoothly. It enables the commission to construct a complete historical record by interviewing and collecting evidence from victims and witnesses of the gross human rights violations and mapping out scenes of violence for the commission's site visits.
- The department of Research conducts research relating to the commission's mandate, assists the research of other units within the commission, and coordinates the writing of the commission's final report.
- The Civic Education and Outreach Unit educates and engages the public in the workings of the commission.

=== Activities of the Commission ===
The Commission will undertake the following activities to fulfill its mandate;

==== Statement taking ====
Statements recorded from victims across the country are the main source of information for the TJRC on gross human rights violations suffered by them during the mandate period (12 December 1963 and 28 February 2008). The statement taking process provides victims with the opportunity to tell the truth about their experiences and those of close friends and relatives.

==== Hearings ====
The TJRC will conduct public and private hearings at which victims, perpetrators, experts will give testimony relating to gross violations of human rights.

Individual hearings

Individual hearings will focus on individual cases, and the experience of individuals with respect to violations within the mandate of the Commission.

Thematic and event hearings

Thematic hearings will focus on types of violations and other broad themes within the mandate of the Commission.

Institutional Hearings

Institutional hearings will focus on the role played by an institution or institutions with respect to violations within the mandate of the Commission

==== Community dialogues ====
The TJRC will hold discussion forums bringing together different groups across the country (ethnic; religious; chiefs; women; youth) to chart ways of establishing reconciliation, harmonious co-existence and national unity. This aspect of the TJRC’s work presents avenues for collaboration with the National Cohesion and Integration Commission (NCIC), and other Agenda Four Commissions.

== The final report ==
This is the Truth Justice and Reconciliation Commission’s main product. It will document the Commission’s work relating to the following aspects:

- Consist of historical record of gross human rights violations
- Outline the Commission’s findings and detail recommendations on: how to address past violations and injustices through reparations and prosecutions; How to prevent future violations in various ways including specific legal and institutional reforms and memorialisation.

Timeline: The Commission began in August 2009 with an operational period of two years. This period includes three months prior to beginning operations for set up, and three months following as a "winding down" period. The Commission requested a 6-month extension, thus the current timeline is as follows:

- Start of set up period: 3 August 2009
- Start of operational period: 3 November 2009
- End of operational period and issuing of report: 3 November 2011
- End of winding down period: 3 February 2012

A full copy of the Final Report, including the dissent submitted by the international Commissioners, can be found at https://digitalcommons.law.seattleu.edu/tjrc/.

== The TJRC and the International Criminal Court ==
The International Criminal Court (ICC) became involved in Kenya when Kenya ratified the ICC's Rome Statute on 15 March 2005, which gave the ICC jurisdiction over war crimes, crimes against humanity, and genocide committed in Kenya after the statute came into force, or July 2002. The ICC has jurisdiction only when the country in question fails to act on crimes against humanity that were perpetrated on its land. The Kenyan government created the Commission of Inquiry on Post Election Violence (CIPEV), otherwise known as the Waki Commission, in February 2008, which was an international commission of inquiry with the aim of investigating the post-election violence that occurred in Kenya. One of the many suggestions in the official report that the Waki Commission made was that the Kenyan government establish a tribunal of both international and national judges to investigate and prosecute perpetrators of the gross human rights violations. The commission gave the government a limited amount of time to agree to create a special tribunal, and made it clear that the commission would give its findings to the ICC if the government failed to establish the tribunal within the given timeframe. In February 2009, after the Kenyan Parliament voted against founding the tribunal and no further action was taken by the government, the Waki Commission handed over its information, including a list of those believed to be responsible for the violence, to the ICC. On 26 November 2009, the Prosecutor requested permission from the court to investigate the crimes against humanity during the post-election violence in Kenya, and was granted permission to do so by the majority of the court. After carrying out investigations against six prominent individuals believed to be responsible for the crimes against humanity, the International Criminal Court investigation in Kenya decided to send four of them to trial. The government has protested the findings. It asked the UN to postpone the ICC's Kenya case, and has put up substantial resistance to the ICC. In addition, confidence in Kenya's judiciary has declined, and, as part of the National Accord made after the 2008 violence, the government has responded by launching an investigation into the judiciary. Four senior judges, Justice Samuel Bosire, Justice Joseph Gregory Nyamu, Justice Samuel Cornelius Riaga Omolo, and Justice Emmanuel Okelo O'Kubasu, were declared unfit for office by the investigation in April 2012. The two senior Court of Appeals judges, Justice Bosire and Justice Nyamu, were removed from office because of their involvement with the Goldenberg scandal trials. It is expected that more judges will be removed from office as the investigation continues. This ruling marks the beginning of the second phase of the vetting process, and the investigation may end the corruption in Kenya's own legal system.

== Criticism and media coverage ==
The relative immaturity of Kenya’s TJRC makes it difficult to evaluate the commission’s success. This immaturity however also secures a great wealth of recent discussion on the TJRC and many opinions regarding its success. For example, the vice-president of the International Center for Transitional Justice recently spoke of the International Criminal Court’s involvement in the efforts to reconcile Kenya. He commented that, “This week's decision in The Hague [confirming four Kenyans must answer to charges of crimes against humanity] was welcomed peacefully across the country. It is telling that most Kenyans support the ICC and have little faith in their own judiciary, which is widely perceived as corrupt.” He called the Kenyan government to fulfill their responsibility to pursue justice at home to avoid violence after the anticipated 2012 election. Similar criticism came from the United States before Hillary Clinton’s visit in August 2009. Specifically the US criticised the use of local courts to try suspects accused of perpetrating violence. These courts, the US argued, had a backlog of hundreds of thousands of cases and a reputation for corruption. Critics also question the credibility of the commissioners because of their connection to Moi's regime and its gross human rights violations. Deputy chair of the commission, lawyer Betty Murungi, resigned saying that she found it difficult to fulfill her duties when the commission leader, Bethwell Kiplagat, faced accusations. Additionally, the inability of the commission to meet its 11 November 2011 report deadline only enhanced public scepticism. The task of reconciling the people of Kenya after the series of gross human rights violations that have occurred of the past half-century requires a stable commission and a government that the people of Kenya can believe in.
