= Howard Zehr =

American criminologist

Howard J. Zehr
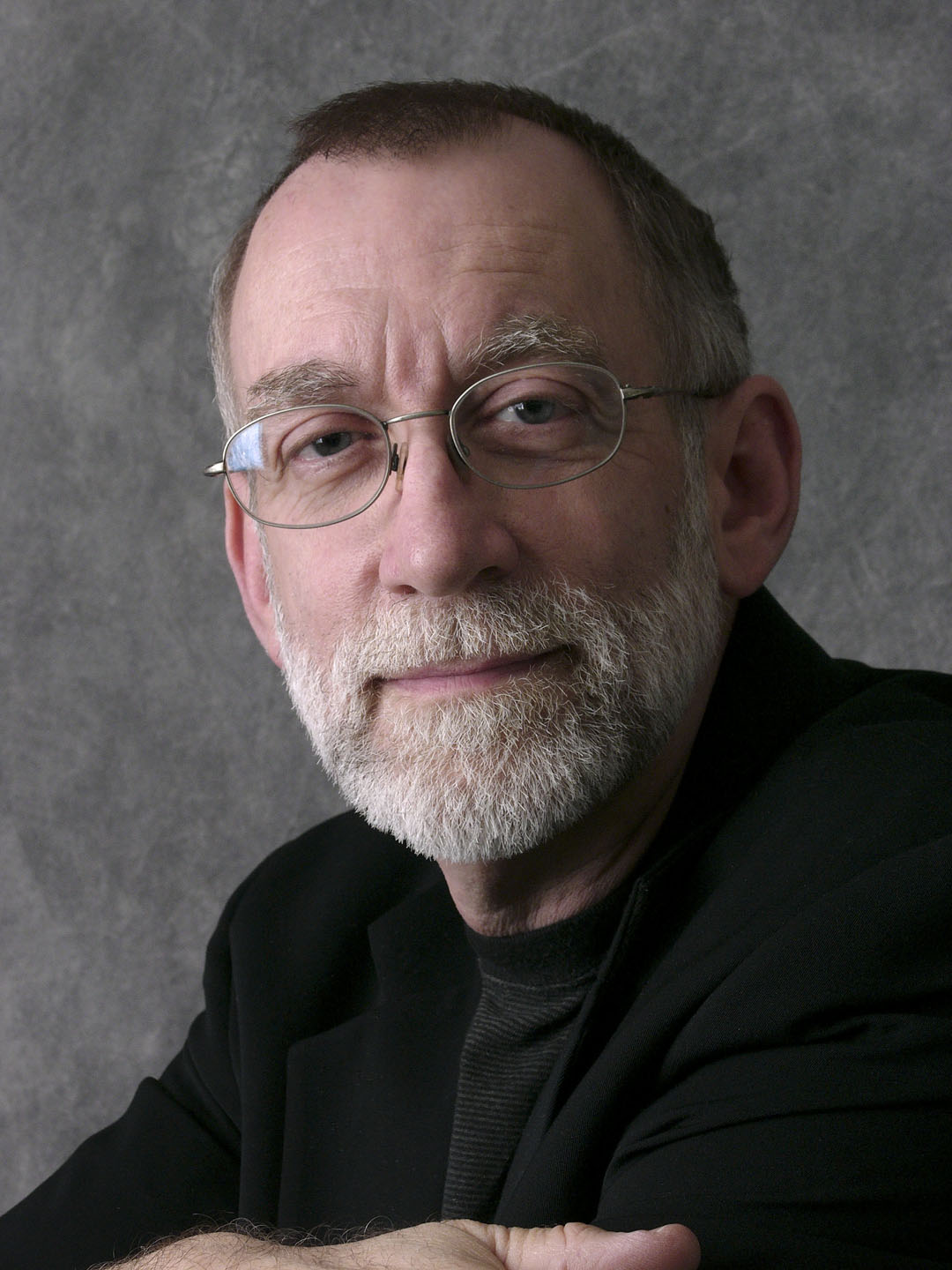
- Zehr in 2005
- Born: July 2, 1944 (age 82); Freeport, Illinois, U.S.

Academic background
- Education: Morehouse College, B.A., University of Chicago, M.A., Rutgers University Ph.D.
- Influences: John Howard Yoder, Nils Christie, Martin Luther King Jr., Peter Stearns, Vincent Harding

Academic work
- Main interests: Penology, restorative justice, restorative processes
- Notable works: Changing Lenses: A New Focus for Crime and Justice (3rd ed, 2005); The Little Book of Restorative Justice (2002)
- Notable ideas: Restorative justice

Howard J. Zehr (born July 2, 1944) is an American criminologist. Zehr is considered to be a pioneer of the modern concept of restorative justice.

He is Distinguished Professor of Restorative Justice at Eastern Mennonite University's Center for Justice and Peacebuilding and Co-director Emeritus of the Zehr Institute for Restorative Justice.

== Life ==
The son of a Mennonite church leader in the midwest, Howard Zehr was born in Freeport, Illinois, and raised through his elementary years in two other Illinois municipalities, Peoria and Fisher. His family moved to Indiana for his middle and high school years. He studied at two Mennonite institutions, for a year each – Goshen College in Indiana and Bethel College in Kansas – before finishing his undergraduate degree in European history at Morehouse College, an all-male liberal arts college that is historically black, in Atlanta, Georgia. Zehr was the first white person to earn a B.A. from Morehouse when he graduated in 1966. Thanks to the school's then-Morehouse College president Dr. Benjamin Mays, Zehr was able to complete his schooling through a minority scholarship that Mays assisted him in securing; Zehr graduated second in his class.

He earned an M.A. in European history at the University of Chicago in 1967 and a Ph.D. in modern European history from Rutgers University in 1974. From 1971 to 1978, he taught at Talladega College in Alabama. He then left academia to do grassroots work, directing a half-way house in 1978 in Elkhart, Indiana, and becoming the founder and director (1978–1982) of an Elkhart County program now called the Center for Community Justice. Through this program, Zehr directed the first victim-offender reconciliation program in the United States. For 17 years, 1979–1996, Zehr directed the Office on Crime and Justice under Mennonite Central Committee (MCC) in Akron, PA. While with MCC, Zehr began doing photojournalism, producing professional-quality photographs that were published in MCC journals and books, such as A Dry Roof and a Cow – Dreams and Portraits of Our Neighbors (Akron, Pa: MCC, 1994).

As of 2023, he was the author of five photography-centered books published by Good Books of Intercourse, Pa.: Doing Life: Reflections of Men and Women Serving Life Without Parole (1996; Japanese edition, 2006); Transcending – Reflections of Crime Victims (2001; Japanese edition, 2006); The Little Book of Contemplative Photography (2005); What Will Happen to Me?, about the children of prisoners (2010); Pickups: A Love Story (2013), a light-hearted look at pickup trucks and their owners. In 2022, Zehr and co-author Barb Toews returned to prisoners featured in the 1996 book and produced Still Doing Life: 22 Lifers 25 Years Later (The New Press, New York & London, 2022).

"Your ability to listen and your respect for human beings, whether they are victims or offenders, is vividly expressed in your two books of photographs and interviews, Transcending – Reflections of Crime Victims, and Doing Life – Reflections of Men and Women Serving Life Sentences," said Thomas J. Porter, JD, executive director of JUSTPEACE Center for Mediation and Conflict Transformation at Hamline University in a ceremony announcing a "lifetime achievement award" for Zehr.

An Ebony magazine reporter wrote: "Howard Zehr, the restorative justice pioneer recognized for building bridges for the voiceless, calls them [the children of prisoners] hidden victims. His latest book, What Will Happen To Me?, places the lens on 30 children whose parents are behind bars. It allows each to be heard as he or she shares thoughts and reflections... The truth of the matter is that approximately 3 million children go to bed with a parent in prison or jail."

Since 1996, Zehr has been a faculty member of Eastern Mennonite University, based at EMU's Center for Justice and Peacebuilding. He served as the center's co-director for five years, 2002–2007. He stepped away from full-time teaching and became co-director of the Zehr Institute for Restorative Justice in 2012.

Zehr is a past member of the Victims Advisory Groups of the United States Sentencing Commission and has taught courses and workshops in restorative justice to more than 1,000 people, many of whom lead their own restorative justice-focused organizations. Representatives of the Council for Restorative Justice at Georgia State University, Youth Justice Initiative in Iowa, and Mediation Northern Ireland are among the leaders Zehr has taught. He has given restorative justice presentations in 35 states and 25 countries. His impact has been especially significant in the United States, Brazil, Japan, Jamaica, Northern Ireland, Britain, Ukraine, and New Zealand, a country that has restructured its juvenile justice system into a family-focused, restorative approach. The impact of New Zealand's restorative approach is outlined in The Little Book of Family Group Conferences, New Zealand Style, co-authored by Zehr.

Dr. Zehr holds a USA amateur radio license, with the call K4LXY.

== Restorative justice ==
No person has done more to inspire the restorative imaginations of citizens of this planet than Howard Zehr. He has been the great teacher who has invited us to sit beside him to see what he can see through his restorative lens.

— John Braithwaite

Zehr's contributions to the field date to the late 1970s, when he was a practitioner in the foundational stage of the restorative justice movement. In that capacity he was one of the original founders of the Center for Community Justice(https://www.centerforcommunityjustice.org), a nonprofit that is still active today. He has led hundreds of events internationally that focus on restorative justice, victim-offender conferencing, judicial reform and other criminal justice issues.

In Restoring Justice–An Introduction to Restorative Justice, Daniel W. Van Ness and Karen Heetderks Strong say that the term "restorative justice" was likely coined by Albert Eglash in 1958 when he distinguished between three approaches to justice: (1) "retributive justice," based on punishment; (2) "distributive justice," involving therapeutic treatment of offenders; and (3) "restorative justice," based on restitution with input from victims and offenders.

Zehr's book Changing Lenses–A New Focus for Crime and Justice, first published in 1990, is credited with being "groundbreaking," one of the first to articulate a theory of restorative justice. It has been translated into seven languages. The title of this book refers to providing an alternative framework for thinking about – or new lens for viewing – crime and justice. Changing Lenses says that in a "retributive justice" framework, crime is an offense against the state, whereas in a restorative justice framework, crime is viewed as a violation of people and relationships. The book made reference to the positive results of efforts in the late 1970s and 1980s at victim-offender mediation, pioneered in the United States by Howard Zehr, Ron Claassen and Mark Umbreit.

A number of scholars believe it is not a coincidence that Mennonites in North America, like Zehr and Claassen, and the social-action arm of their church-community, Mennonite Central Committee, played major roles in popularizing the theory and practices of restorative justice. "[T]he antinomian groups advocating and supporting restorative justice, such as the Mennonites (as well as Amish and Quaker groups), subscribe to principled pacifism and also tend to believe that restorative justice is much more humane than the punitive juvenile and criminal justice systems."

By the second half of the 1990s, the expression "restorative justice" had become popular, evolving to universal usage by 2006. The restorative justice movement has attracted many segments of society, including "police officers, judges, schoolteachers, politicians, juvenile justice agencies, victim support groups, aboriginal elders, and mums and dads."

"Restorative justice is a fast-growing state, national and international social movement that seeks to bring together people to address the harm caused by crime," write Mark Umbreit and Marilyn Peterson Armour. "Restorative justice views violence, community decline, and fear-based responses as indicators of broken relationships. It offers a different response, namely the use of restorative solutions to repair the harm related to conflict, crime, and victimization."

In Changing Lenses, Howard Zehr describes restorative justice as focusing on the harms done, and consequent needs and obligations, of all parties involved (victims, offenders and the communities in which the harm occurred). He sets forth these six guiding questions:

1. Who has been hurt?
2. What are their needs?
3. Whose obligations are these?
4. What are the causes?
5. Who has a stake in the situation?
6. What is the appropriate process to involve stakeholders in an effort to address causes and put things right?

The growth of restorative justice has been facilitated by NGOs dedicated to this approach to justice, such as the Victim Offender Mediation Association, as well as by the establishment of academic centers, such as Zehr's Center for Justice and Peacebuilding at Eastern Mennonite University in Virginia, the University of Minnesota's Center for Restorative Justice and Peacemaking, the Community Justice Institute at Florida Atlantic University, the Center for Peacemaking and Conflict Studies at Fresno Pacific University in California, and the Centre for Restorative Justice at Simon Fraser University in British Columbia, Canada.

In the afterword to the third edition of Changing Lenses, Zehr acknowledges the debt that restorative justice owes to many indigenous traditions. "Two peoples have made very specific and profound contributions to practices in the field – the First Nations people of Canada and the U.S., and the Maori of New Zealand... [I]n many ways, restorative justice represents a validation of values and practices that were characteristic of many indigenous groups," whose traditions were "often discounted and repressed by western colonial powers."

Zehr has raised awareness that judicial punishment is a social choice, rather than being the only possible response to crime, and that a more socially productive, healing choice can emerge through the application of restorative justice. Zehr argues that punishment – or inflicting suffering as repayment for harm done – rarely results in healing for anybody and often makes matters worse.

Congruent with his Mennonite Church USA tradition, Zehr links restorative justice practices to the Judeo-Christian concept of Shalom: "Emphasizing 'right relationships' between individuals, between groups of people, between people and the earth, and between people and the divine, Shalom declares an ultimate allegiance to respecting life in all its forms... [It] encourages us to see the nurturing of this sacred relational web as our ultimate calling."

== Rejoinder: justice that is not ==
Restorative justice is, according to Zehr, a practice defined solely from the perspective of 'what it is not', whereby most of its potentialities are deviated from its intentions and end controversially by reinforcing the established mode of justice. Hence, among the maxims often associated to a 'Zehrist' way of defining restorative justice by the negative there are:

- "RJ's main objective is not to pardon nor to make amends”
- "RJ is not mediation”
- "RJ is not intended to reduce recidivism or serial offending”
- "RJ is not a program or specific project”
- "RJ is not an alternative to criminal justice”
- "RJ is not an alternative to imprisonment”
- "RJ is not antithetical to criminal justice".

Thus, in spite of its allegedly "transformative element, restorative justice is not conceived [as] a real alternative to the ongoing model of justice". It is the reason why, from a 'Zehrist' point of view, restorative justice "does not succeed in reconstructing the traditional legal theory, nor build a new theory of criminal intervention as a whole” - it is rather proposed as an analog of justice as we know it (Juliana Tonche, 'Justiça restaurativa e racionalidade penal moderna', Revista de Estudos Empíricos em Direito, vol. 3, n. 1, jan 2016, p. 129-143).

== Quotes ==
How is restorative justice defined? "Restorative justice is a process to involve, to the extent possible, those who have a stake in a specific offence and to collectively identify and address harms, needs and obligations, in order to heal and put things as right as possible." Howard Zehr in The Little Book of Restorative Justice

What does restorative justice try to do? "Restorative justice requires, at minimum, that we address victims' harms and needs, hold offenders accountable to put right those harms, and involve victims, offenders, and communities in this process." Howard Zehr in The Little Book of Restorative Justice

== Honors ==
Selected awards and honors:

- University of Alabama at Birmingham, Ireland Distinguished Visiting Scholar Award, 2015
- Gandhi Center of James Madison University, co-recipient of its "Community Service Award" (the third award conferred by the Gandhi Center, after "global nonviolence awards" to Desmond Tutu in 2007 and Jimmy and Rosalynn Carter in 2009), 2013
- International Peace Award from the Community of Christ, 2006
- Lifetime Achievement Award, Journal of Law and Religion, Hamline University, St. Paul, Minn., 2006
- The Restorative Justice Association of Virginia (the first annual Howard Zehr Award), 2005
- The New York Dispute Resolution Association's annual Peacebuilder Award, 2003
- Prison Fellowship International's Restorative Justice Prize, 2003
- Michael Sattler Peace Prize (awarded by the German Mennonite Peace Committee), 2010

== Works ==
Howard Zehr is the author, co-author or editor of two dozen books, plus the source of dozens of chapters, op-ed pieces, and other presentations. He is widely interviewed by or quoted in the media. Zehr's list of publications includes:

- Fundamental Concepts of Restorative Justice. Akron, Pennsylvania: Mennonite Central Committee. 1997* Justice: Retribution or Restoration?. Peacework Magazine on the web, April 1999.
- Restorative Justice: When Justice and Healing Go Together. Track Two. 6(3&4) 1997
- "Restorative Justice Signposts: Victim Involvement". OVA Newsletter, Mary Achilles, Victim Advocate, Vol. 4, Issue 1. 2000
- "Family Group Conferences: A Challenge to Victim Offender Mediation?". Victim Offenders Mediation Association Quarterly 7(1):4-8. 1996
- "Justice Paradigm Shift? Values and Visions in the Reform Process." Mediation Quarterly 12(3):207-216. 1995
- Changing Lenses: A New Focus for Crime and Justice. Scottsdale, PA: Herald Press, 271p. 1990
- "Justice: Stumbling Toward a Restorative Ideal.". In: P. Arthur (ed.), Justice: The Restorative Vision. New Perspectives on Crime and Justice (Issue #7). Akron, PA: Mennonite Central Committee Office of Criminal Justice, pp. 1–15. 1989
- "Retributive Justice, Restorative Justice.". New Perspectives on Crime and Justice (Issue #4). Akron, PA: Mennonite Central Committee Office of Criminal Justice, September, 16p. 1985
- "Mediating the Victim-Offender Conflict.". New Perspectives on Crime and Justice (Issue #2). Akron, PA: Mennonite Central Committee Office of Criminal Justice, September, 30p. 1980
- "Victim Offender Reconciliation: An Incarceration Substitute?". Federal Probation 46(4):63-68. 1982
- Doing Life: Reflections of Men and Women Serving Life Sentences. Intercourse, PA: Good Books. 1998
- "Justice that heals: The practice. Paper presented at the Making Crime Pay conference. Wellington, New Zealand, June 1994.". Stimulus 2 (August): 69-74. 1994
- Restorative Family Group Conferences: Differing Models and Guidelines for Practice. Federal Probation. 60(3): 24-29. 1996
- "Restorative justice for crime victims: The promise and the challenge.". In Restorative community justice: Repairing harm and transforming communities, ed. Gordon Bazemore and Mara Schiff, 87-99. With an introduction by Gordon Bazemore and Mara Schiff. Cincinnati, OH: Anderson Publishing Co. 2001
- "Restorative Justice: The Concept.". Corrections Today. 59(7):68-70. 1997
- "Ways of knowing for a restorative worldview.". Photocopied draft. 2000
- Restorative justice sign posts. Conciliation Quarterly 20 (3): 11. 2001
- Journey to Belonging: Flight from shame. Reflections: A Journal of the Conflict Transformation Program 1: 6-9. 2002
- Restoring Justice: Envisioning a Justice Process Focused on Healing – Not Punishment. The Other Side 33(5), Sept – Dec 1997. 1997
- Restorative justice and substance abuse: The path ahead. In Bringing restorative justice to adolescent substance abuse, ed. Kathryn G. Herr. Special issue of Youth & Society 33 (December), 314-328. Thousand Oaks, CA: Sage Publications. 2001
- Fundamental Concepts of Restorative Justice. Contemporary Justice Review. 1: 47-55. Reprinted in Restorative Justice. Declan Roche (2003), ed. pp. 73–81. The International Library of Essays in Law & Legal Theory, Second Series. Aldershot, Hants, England: Dartmouth/Ashgate. 1998
- Victim offender conferencing in Pennsylvania's juvenile justice system. Harrisonburg, PA: Eastern Mennonite University, Conflict Transformation Program. 1998
- Restorative justice. Corrections Today. 59(7): 68-114 1997
- Journey to belonging. Paper presented at the Fourth International Conference on Restorative Justice for Juveniles, October (Tübingen, Germany). 2000
- Journey to Belonging. Paper presented at the Just Peace? Peace Making and Peace Building for the New Millennium conference, held in Auckland, New Zealand, April 24–28. Auckland, New Zealand: Massey University, School of Social and Cultural Studies, Centre for Justice and Peace Development. 2000
- Paradigms of justice- old and new. In Spiritual roots of restorative justice: A collection of faith community perspectives, 37. Ontario, Canada: Ontario Multifaith Council on Spiritual & Religious Care. 2000
- Journey to Belonging. In, Elmar G.M. Weitekamp and Han-Jurgen Kerner, Restorative Justice: Theoretical Foundations. Deon, UK: Willan Publishing. pp. 21–31. 2002
- The Little Book of Restorative Justice. Intercourse, PA: Good Books. 2002
- Re-Thinking Criminal Justice: Restorative Justice. Re-Thinking Criminal Justice. 1(May): 1-13. 1995
- Restoring justice. In God and the victim: Theological reflections on evil, victimization, justice, and forgiveness, ed. Lisa Barnes Lampman and Michelle D. Shattuck, 131-159. Grand Rapids, MI: William B. Eerdmans Publishing Company; and Neighbors Who Care: Washington, D.C. 1999
- Rethinking God, Justice, and Treatment of Offenders. Journal of Offender Rehabilitation. 35(3/4): 259-285. 2002
- Critical Issues in Restorative Justice: An Inadequate and Overlapping Outline. VOMA Connections 12 (Autumn). Downloaded June 22, 2004. 2002
- Taking Victims and Their Advocates Seriously: A Listening Project. Harrisonburg, VA: Institute for Justice and Peacebuilding at Eastern Mennonite University.
- Ways of Knowing for a Restorative Worldview. In, Elmar Weitekamp and Hans-Jurgen Kerner, eds. Restorative Justice in Context: International Practice and Directions. Devon, UK and Portland Oregon: Willan Publishing. pp. 257–271. 2003
- Justice as Restoration, Justice as Respect. Justice Professional. 11: 71-87. 1998
- Mediating the Victim-Offender Conflict. Mennonite Central Committee. Victim Offender Reconciliation Program. 1980
- Critical Issues in Restorative Justice. Monsey, New York and Cullompton, Devon, UK: Criminal Justice Press and Willan Publishing. 2004
- A Restorative Framework for Community Justice Practice. In, Kieran McEvoy and Tim Newburn, eds., Criminology, Conflict Resolution and Restorative Justice. Basingstoke, Hampshire, UK and New York, NY: Palgrave MacMillan. pp. 135–152. 2003
- A call for thoughtful response: Conflict Transformation staff thoughts on trauma and healing. Harrisonburg, VA: Eastern Mennonite University, Conflict Transformation Program. 2001
- Listening to Victims—A Critique of Restorative Justice Policy and Practice in the United States. Federal Probation. 68(1): 32-38. 2004
- Family group conferences: A challenge to victim offender mediation?. Accord, a publication of Canadian Mennonite Central Committee. 1996
- Transcending: Reflections of Crime Victims. Intercourse, PA: Good Books. 2001
- The Meaning of Life: Working at the Healing Edge. Offender Program Report. 11:71-87. 1998
- Justice Alternative: A Restorative Approach. The Corrections Psychologist. 30(1). 1998
- Justice Alternatives: A Restorative Perspective. Imbizo. February. 1996
- Restitution Reduces Recidivism. Crime and Justice Network Newsletter. Oct 1990 – Mar 1991. p7. Downloaded January 20, 2005. 1990
- Evaluation and Restorative Justice Principles. In Elizabeth Elliott and Robert M. Gordon, eds., New Directions in Restorative Justice: Issues, Practice, Evaluation. Cullompton, UK: Willan Publishing. pp. 296–303. 2005
- The Little Book of Family Group Conferences: New Zealand style. Intercourse, PA: Good Books. 2004
- Restaurando relaciones: Una manera distanta de hacer justicia. San Salvador, El Salvador: Asociación Bienestar Yek Ineme 2001
- The ideas of engagement and empowerment. in, Gerry Johnstone and Daniel W. Van Ness, eds., Handbook of Restorative Justice. Cullompton, Devon: Willan Publishing. pp. 41–58 2007
- 'Avaliação e princípios da justiça restaurativa'; in C. Slakmon, M. Rocha Machado and P. Cruz Bottini (eds.), Novas Direções na Governança da Justiça e da Segurança (Brasília- D.F.: Ministry of Justice of Brazil, United Nations Development Programme – Brazil, and the School of Law of the Getulio Vargas Foundation – São Paulo). pp. 411– 417. 2006
- 'Maneiras de conhecer para uma visão restaurativa de mundo'; in C. Slakmon, M. Rocha Machado and P. Cruz Bottini (eds.), Novas Direções na Governança da Justiça e da Segurança (Brasília- D.F.: Ministry of Justice of Brazil, United Nations Development Programme – Brazil, and the School of Law of the Getulio Vargas Foundation – São Paulo). pp. 419–432. 2006
- El pequeño libro de la justicia restaurativa. Intercourse, PA: Good Books. 2007
- Why Can't We Just Apologize?. The Crime Victims Report. 11(3):38. 2007
- Still Doing Life: 22 Lifers 25 Years Later, co-author Barb Toews. New York & London: The New Press. 2022
- Restorative Justice – Insights and Stories from My Journey. Lancaster, PA: Walnut Street Books. 2023
