= Nilofar Sakhi =

Afghan activist

Nilofar Sakhi (Dari: نيلوفر سخی) is an author and a policy analyst with expertise in traditional and non-traditional security, geopolitics & peace. She is a professorial lecturer of International Affairs at George Washington University and serves as the president of Andiana Foundation. She holds the position of senior fellow (NR) at the Atlantic Council.

== Career ==
Nilofar Sakhi is a professorial lecturer of International Affairs at George Washington University and the president of Andiana Foundation. She holds a position of non resident senior fellow at Atlantic Council. Sakhi has extensive experience in management of organizations focused on development, higher education, and human security. Sakhi taught at George Mason University and American University of Afghanistan. She served as a country director of the Open Society Foundation-Afghanistan office and an executive director at the American University of Afghanistan.She is the former chief executive and executive director at the American University of Afghanistan.

A former Fulbright fellow, Nilofar Sakhi has written extensively on various aspects of traditional and nontraditional security, geopolitics of peace, peacemaking and peacebuilding processes and human security. Her recent book is on Human Security and Agency: Reframing productive power in Afghanistan. Currently she is working on regional security with a case study of Afghanistan-South and Central Asia and exploring the domestic and external incongruences that impact regional peace diplomacy. She has been involved in assisting peace, development, and counter insurgency policy formulation. A former visiting fellow at National Endowment for Democracy and Columbia University, and a fellow at Asia Society and International Center for Tolerance Education, Nilofar has researched a wide range of research projects pertaining to politics of peace, security, negotiations and mediation in peacemaking processes.

Sakhi is the founder of a national NGO WASSA, the first women's NGO in Herat, Afghanistan founded in 2002. While there she established the Center for Conflict Analysis and Resolution at WASSA in 2008. She is the former executive director at American University of Afghanistan, and former country director of Open Society Afghanistan. Prior to serving as country director she was the Senior Consultant on Rule of Law, Transitional Justice, Human Rights and Women's Rights at the Open Society Institute in Afghanistan. She has served as a fellow at both the International Center for Tolerance Education and the Asia 21 Young Leaders Initiative in 2010, and as a visiting fellow at the National Endowment for Democracy, Columbia University. She is also on the International Steering Committee at Afghanistan: Pathways to Peace.

The institute also houses the Laura Bush Library and Resource Center and was funded by a $5 million grant from the U.S. Department of Defense Task Force for Business and Stability Operations. The work of the center focuses on providing the tools and resources necessary to promote women's rights and opportunities in business and government in Afghanistan. During her time with ICAWED she has met with several dignitaries, including United States Secretary of State John Kerry Her work has focused largely on advocating at the national and international level for improvements in public policies involving the rights of women and peaceful economic and political transition.

Speaking of the future of women's rights in a Voice of America interview Sakhi noted that the next generation of women have strong role models in current Afghan society,

"Looking at women talking about their political rights in parliament, looking at women entering into business and having trade in Malaysia and Dubai, and looking at women who are successful personalities internationally of raising Afghanistan voices. This gives an image."

== External sources ==
- Center for the Study of Islam & Democracy Retrieved on Jan-14-2007
- Scripps Howard Foundation Wire Retrieved on Jan-14-2007
- Eastern Mennonite University Retrieved on Jan-14-2007
