= Njonjo Land Commission =

Kenyan government commission

The Njonjo Commission of Inquiry into Land Law systems was a Kenya Government Commission established in 1999. It was focused on coming up with principles of a National Land Policy framework, the constitutional position of land and formulation of a new institutional framework for land administration. It was chaired by former Attorney General Charles Njonjo.
