= Eastern Mennonite University =

Private university in Harrisonburg, Virginia, US

- Former names: Eastern Mennonite School (1917–1947); Eastern Mennonite College (1947–1994)
- Motto: "Preparing students to serve and lead globally." Guiding biblical verse: "Do justice, love mercy and walk humbly with God." (Micah 6:8)
- Type: Private university
- Established: 1917; 109 years ago
- Religious affiliation: Mennonite Church USA
- Endowment: $25.587 million (as of 2014)
- President: Shannon W. Dycus
- Provost: Tynisha D. Willingham
- Faculty: Approximately 100 full-time and 100 part-time faculty
- Undergraduates: 730 (fall 2025)
- Postgraduates: 297 (fall 2025)
- Location: Harrisonburg, Virginia, U.S. 38.470966°N 78.879519°W
- Colors: White, black and royal blue
- Nickname: Royals
- Sporting affiliations: NCAA Division III Old Dominion Athletic Conference Continental Volleyball Conference
- Mascot: HeRM (His Royal Majesty) the Lion
- Website: emu.edu
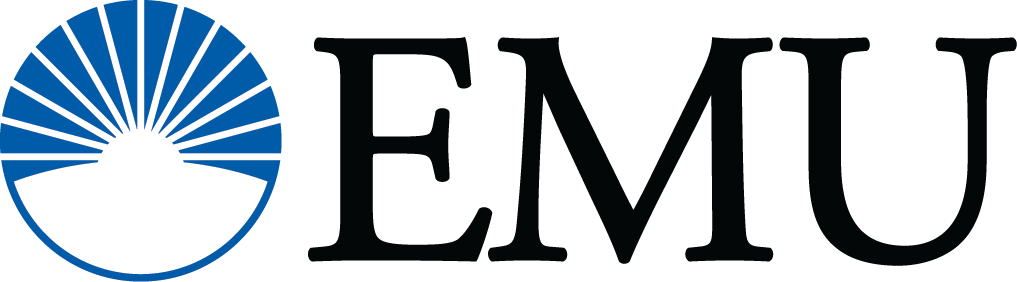

Eastern Mennonite University (EMU) is a private Mennonite university in Harrisonburg, Virginia. The university also operates a satellite campus in Lancaster, Pennsylvania. It hosts the Center for Justice and Peacebuilding.

== History ==
Eastern Mennonite University was launched in 1917 as the "Eastern Mennonite School" by a group of Mennonite church members. They recognized that their church-centered communities needed to offer schooling beyond the basic level for young-adult Mennonites. These church leaders sought to stem the tide toward enrolling in secular educational institutions. One of that founding group, Bishop George R. Brunk Sr., stated that "the world standard of education is self-centered, self-exalting, and materialistic." By contrast, he advocated a form of Christian education that "expands and develops the God-given powers both natural and spiritual, guides them [students] into channels of activity most conducive to God's glory and the blessing of mankind."

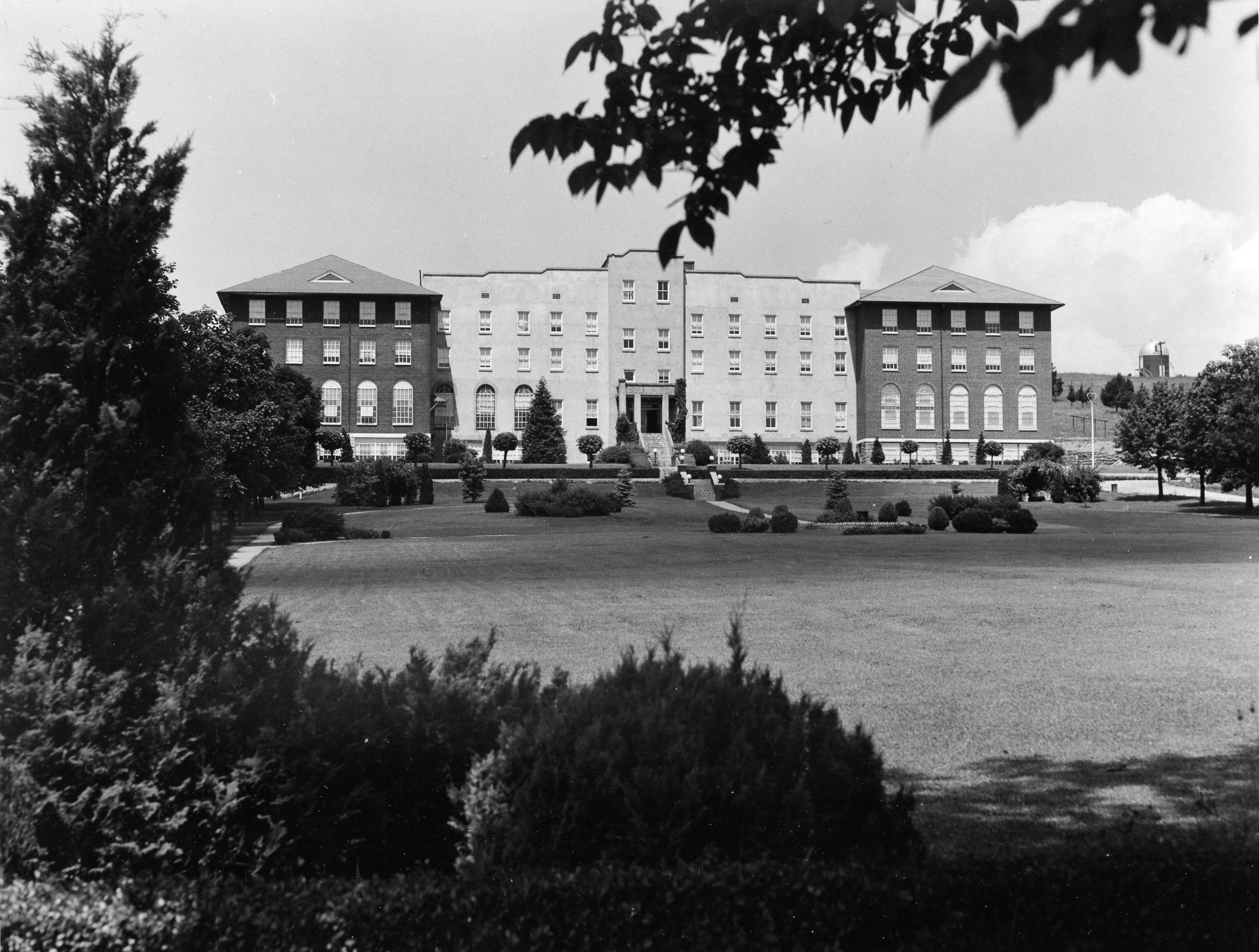
Administration Building in 1943

Eastern Mennonite's first registrar, John Early Suter, believed that the university should offer secular academics in addition to Bible classes, and he was one of the first two such teachers. The Suter Science Center was named in honor of J. Early Suter's son, Daniel Suter, who taught in the Biology department from 1948 to 1985. In 1947, the school began to offer bachelors degrees in subjects other than theology and changed its name for the first time, becoming "Eastern Mennonite College".

In 1948, EMU admitted a local African American student, becoming one of the first historically white colleges in the U.S. South to integrate prior to the Civil Rights Act of 1964. (The University of Arkansas also admitted African American students, beginning in 1948.)

EMU served only members of the Mennonite church in the early and mid 1900s, but since then has educated thousands other than its original constituency of "Anabaptists," a broad term for Mennonites and kindred subscribers to the theology of Anabaptism. EMU and its seminary are affiliated with the Mennonite Education Agency of the Mennonite Church USA, as are five other higher education institutions in Kansas, Indiana and Ohio – Bethel College (Kansas), Goshen College, Bluffton University, Hesston College and Anabaptist Mennonite Biblical Seminary.

In 1994, the college changed its name for a second time, becoming "Eastern Mennonite University".

In the last 20 years in particular, EMU has attracted people from all over the world and various faiths who are interested in the way it combines peace, social justice, simplicity and community. EMU orients its students toward "experiential learning" (i.e. hands-on learning, connected to real-world work), "creation care" (environmental sustainability), and "cross-cultural engagement" (required of all undergraduates).

== Beliefs ==
=== Marriage ===
The school's "Community Lifestyle Commitment" statement had been cited as reason for terminating the employment of faculty and staff members who were sexually active gay men or lesbians. In 2004, then-President Loren Swartzendruber stated that the university's and Mennonite Church USA's policy was that "sexual relationships are reserved for a man and a woman in marriage" and applied equally to faculty members who are heterosexual. He noted that two heterosexual employees had also been let go after having extramarital sexual relationships.

However, in November 2013 EMU's Board of Trustees suspended the enforcement of its same-sex relationships policy and authorized Swartzendruber to lead a six-month study of whether or not to allow tenure-track faculty to pursue same-sex relationships without censure.

On 16 July 2015, EMU's board added "sexual orientation" to their non-discrimination policy, allowing for the hiring of faculty and staff involved in same-sex marriages.

This decision was criticized by member-universities of the Council for Christian Colleges and Universities (CCCU), prompting EMU to leave the organization in September 2015.

== Environmentalism ==
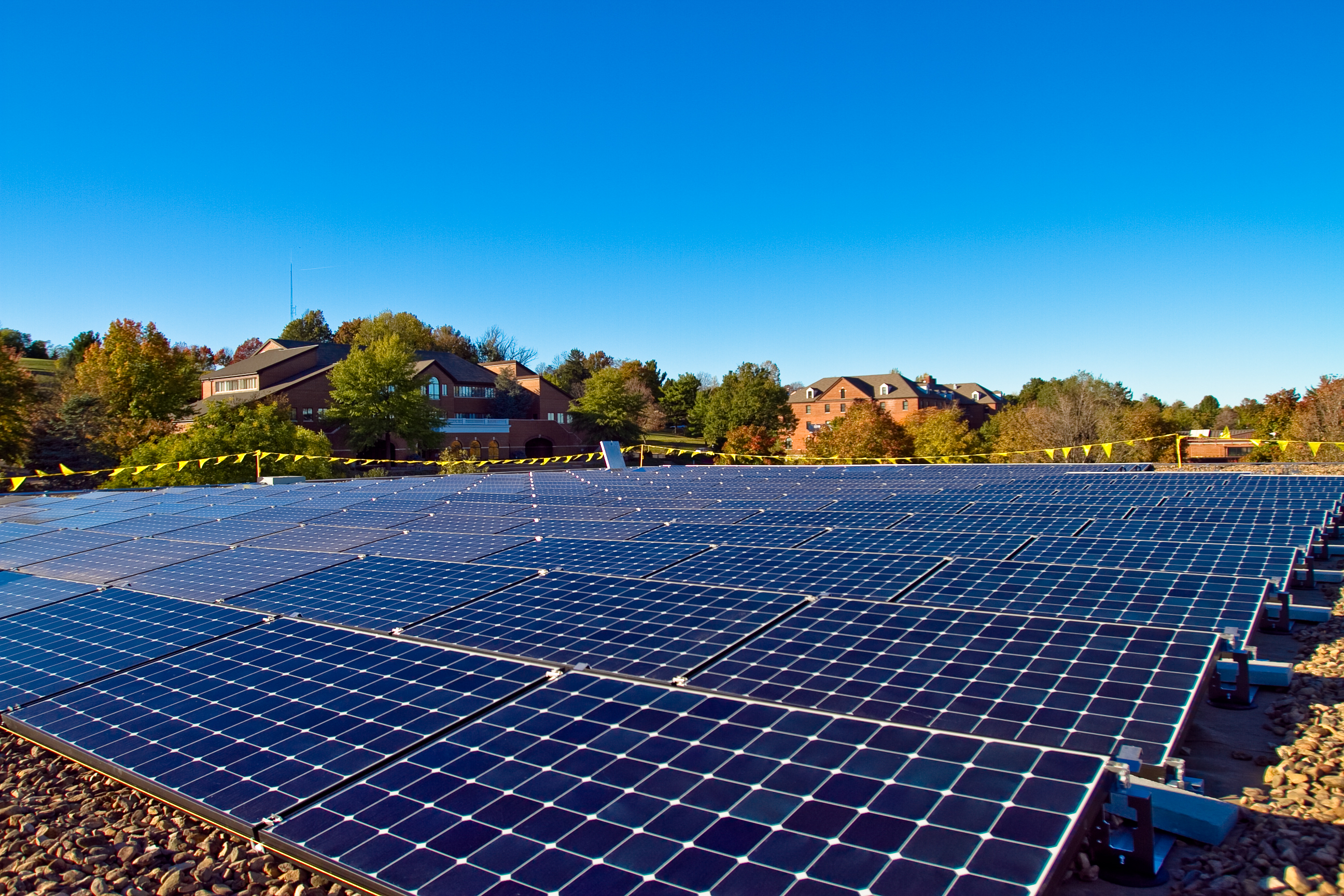
Eastern Mennonite University Solar Array

It has environmental programs, such as low energy consumption, solar energy production, sustainable new construction, recycling, and composting efforts. Three residence halls meet the gold-level requirements of LEED (Leadership in Energy and Environmental Design).

== Academics ==
As of 2010 EMU's undergraduate programs included 35 majors, 16 teacher education certification programs, 9 pre-professional programs such as pre-engineering and health sciences, and 4 associate degrees. Both the Harrisonburg and Lancaster locations offer an Adult Degree Completion Program. 98% of job-seeking graduate from the class of 2021 were employed within 12 months of graduation.

Each year EMU offers high-achieving high school students the opportunity to be part of the university's honors program. Selected students can receive 50% to 100% tuition scholarships, renewable for each year of undergraduate study. They also receive mentoring from assigned faculty members and attend honors seminars and social gatherings together.

=== Peace studies ===
The university hosts the Center for Justice and Peacebuilding (CJP) which includes a graduate program in conflict transformation. CJP has educated and trained more than 3,000 people from 124 countries. CJP's founding director, John Paul Lederach, and its expert in restorative justice, Howard Zehr, are considered to be international leaders in the fields of peace and justice.

=== Undergraduate admissions ===
In 2024, EMU accepted 99.5% of undergraduate applicants, with admission standards considered elite, applicant competition considered very low, and with those enrolled having an average 3.7 high school GPA. The college does not require submission of standardized test scores, the university having a test blind policy. Those enrolled that submitted test scores had an average 1320 SAT score (3% submitting scores) or an average 29 ACT score (4% submitting scores).

=== Rankings ===
Academic rankings

Regional
- U.S. News & World Report: 48 (tie)

For 2025, U.S. News & World Report ranked EMU tied for No.48 out of 135 Regional Universities South.

=== Cross-cultural study requirement ===
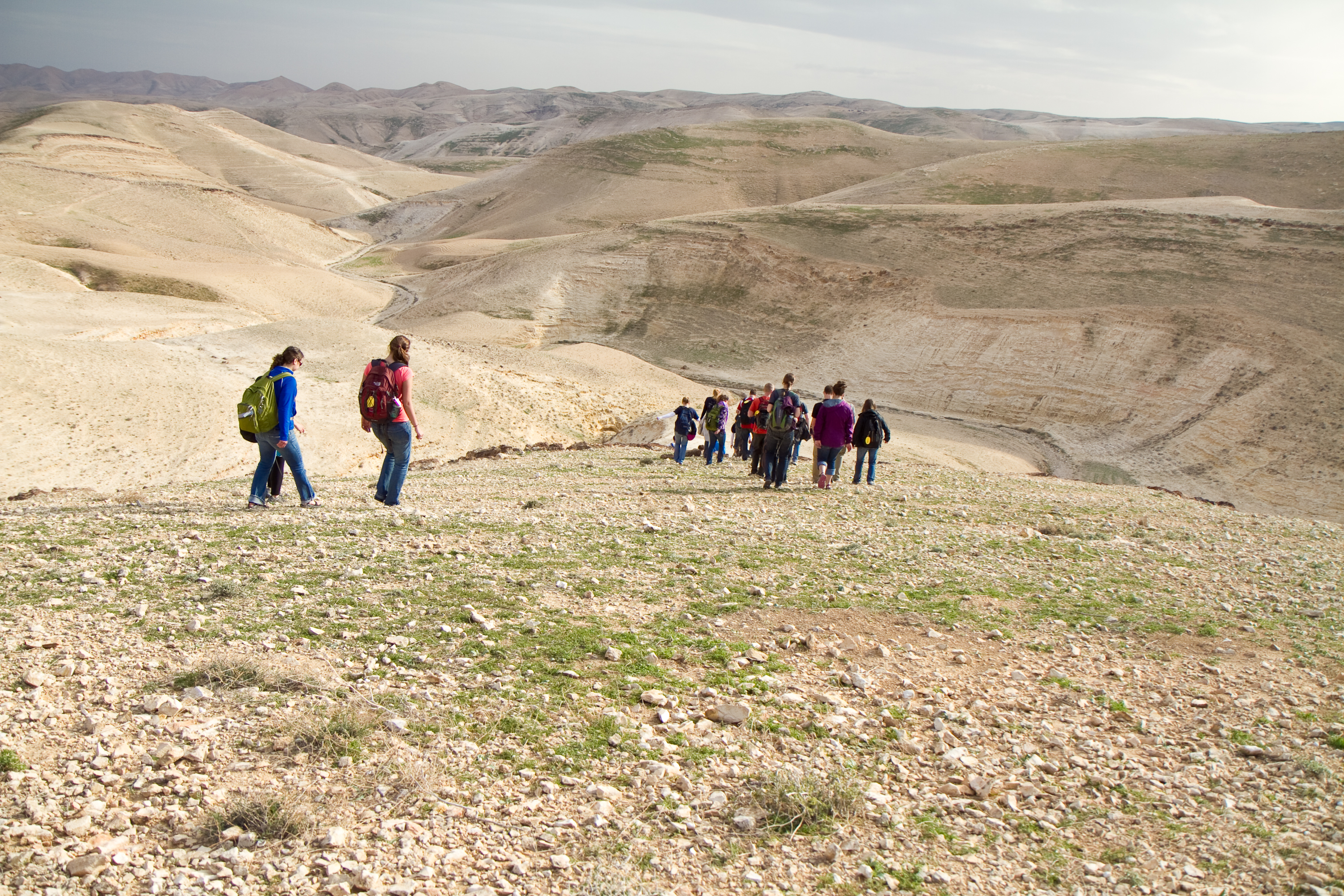
Eastern Mennonite University Campus Students on a Cross-cultural Trip

EMU was one of the earliest colleges to require cross-cultural study of all undergraduates, with a university-sponsored program beginning in the 1970s. EMU recommends that its undergraduate students earn 15 semester hours of credit by living, studying and serving in cross-cultural settings. Nine cross-cultural credits are the minimum number required for graduation; these can be earned through in-class study and a summer stint of three to six weeks in a cross-cultural setting. Most undergraduates embark on semester-long, faculty-led, cross-cultural experiences, usually involving home stays in non-U.S. settings, such as Israel, Guatemala, South Africa, India, Spain and Morocco. But some students opt to satisfy the cross-cultural requirement by studying and interning in Washington, D.C., while living in EMU-owned housing supervised by faculty members. Others choose individualized alternatives, such as a summer of studying business with an international manufacturer or 11 months of service with the SALT program of Mennonite Central Committee.

More than 75% of EMU's faculty members have lived in a cross-cultural context. The leaders of EMU-sponsored trips are drawn from the ranks of faculty and staff members who have had extensive experience in the settings to which they are leading students. Since 2001, three EMU faculty members have been Fulbright Scholars.

=== Seminary, graduate and summer programs ===
EMU's Graduate School offers master's degrees. Extensive summer study programs are available through: EMU's Summer Peacebuilding Institute (four consecutive sessions); Washington Community Scholars' Program; Summer Bridge Scholarship Program, in which EMU collaborates with the National Science Foundation to offer scholarships for incoming science students to spend a summer working with faculty; a Ministry Inquiry Program in which upper-level students are able to spend 11 weeks as an intern in a congregation; nine-day Summer Institute for Spiritual Formation; graduate-level courses for teachers. The Intensive English Program attracts students who need to improve their mastery of spoken and written English before continuing into higher studies at EMU or another American college.

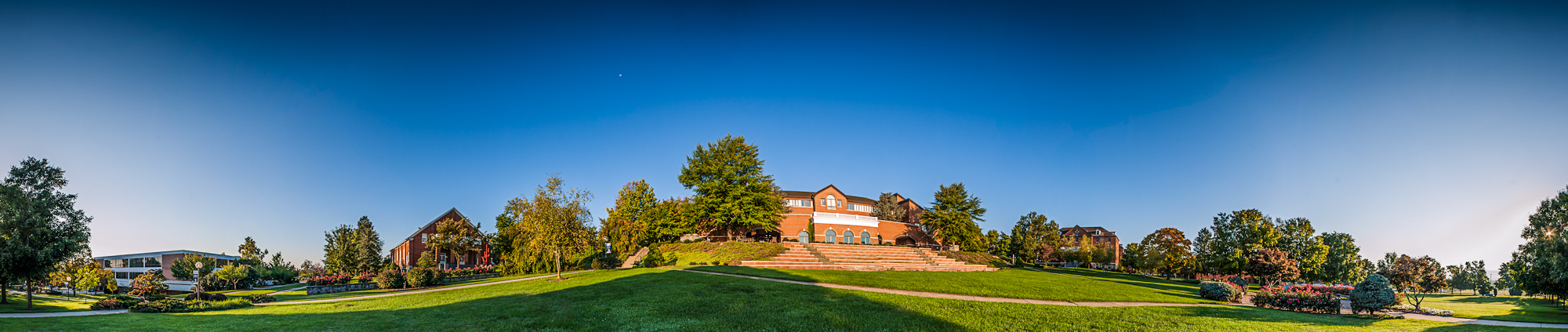
Panorama of EMU's Campus

== Campus life ==
=== Expectations for community members ===
Eastern Mennonite's 361-word "Community Lifestyle Commitment" was adopted by the board of trustees in 2001. With this document as a guide, the institution expects its employees and students to commit themselves to a lifestyle based on "clearly stated expectations [to] promote orderly community life," coupled with "trust in and responsibility to one another". It calls for "stewardship of mind, time, abilities and finances" and takes the unusual step of asking for "social responsibility in my standard of living and use of economic resources". EMU expects community members to "respect and abide by the university policy that prohibits the use of alcohol and tobacco on campus or at university functions and the misuse of alcohol off campus".

The statement also asks community members to refrain from "sexual harassment and abuse, pornography, acts of violence, abusive or demeaning language and the use of illegal drugs" as well as "sexual relationships outside of marriage". However, the school does permit homosexual activity within the confines of marriage.

=== Campus ministries ===
Residential undergraduates, faculty, and staff gather for twice-weekly chapel services planned by the campus pastoral team. Voluntary Bible study and worship also occur in smaller settings during the week and on weekends.

The Campus Ministries program sponsors activities such as campus-wide chapels on Wednesday and Friday mornings, a student-led praise-style service on Sunday evenings, monthly hymn sings and Taize worship services, annual "spiritual life week", and service experiences under the Young People's Christian Association. Campus Ministries is led by the three trained pastors, assisted by students at various stages in their education including seminary students at EMU. Pastoral Assistants live in residence buildings and plan voluntary weekly activities.

=== Outdoor and indoor recreation ===
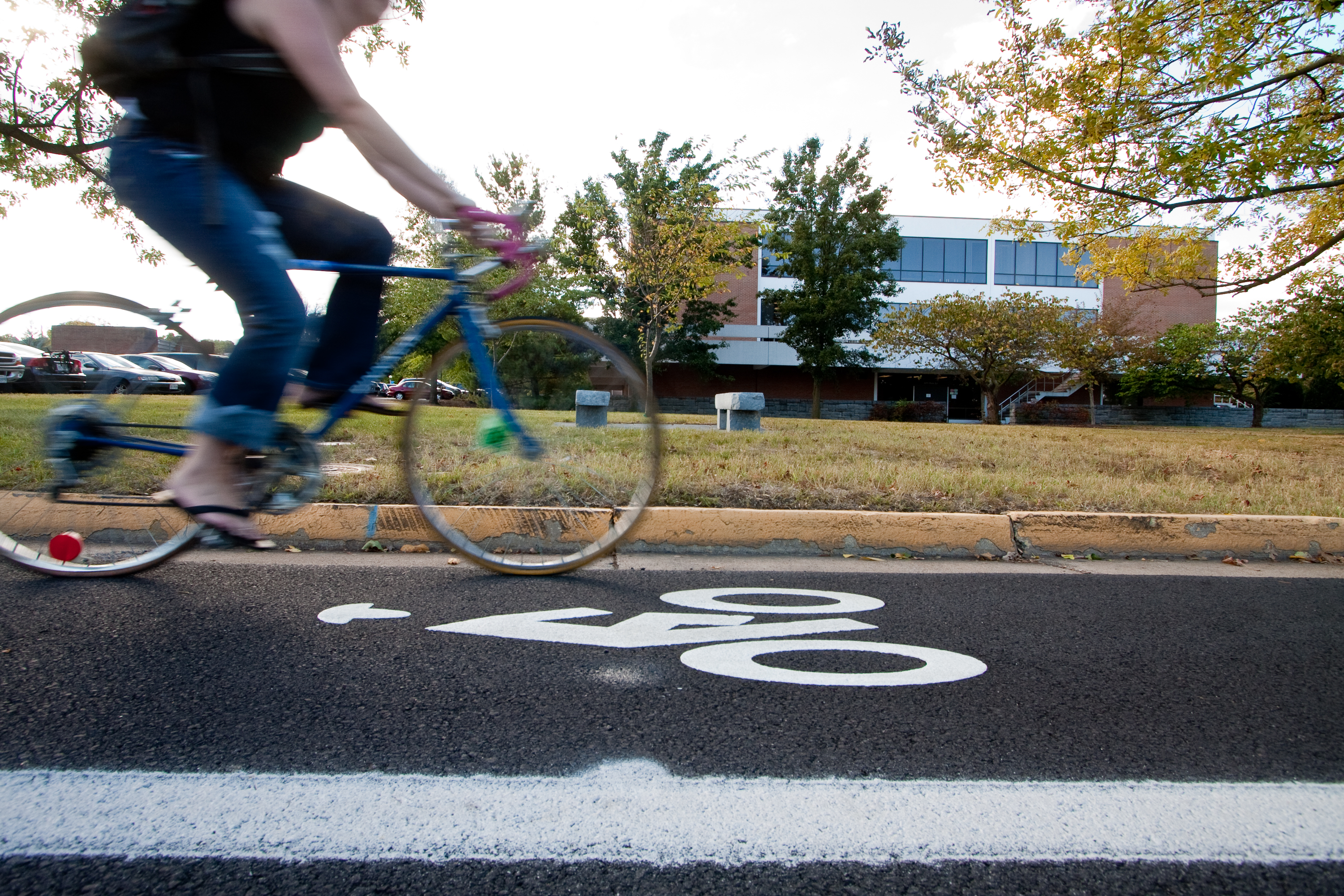
Bicycle Lane on Eastern Mennonite University Campus

As a result of EMU's location, bicycling is popular among the faculty and students as a means to commute, do errands, and for recreational jaunts around the countryside, both on and off roads.

Other popular outdoor activities are kayaking & canoeing, swimming, golfing, hiking, horseback riding, hunting & fishing, spelunking and skiing & other winter sports at nearby private and public parks and centers, such as Shenandoah National Park, George Washington and Jefferson National Forests, and Massanutten Four-Season Resort. On campus, students, staff and faculty maintain a greenhouse, an arboretum, and a large vegetable garden.

Indoor recreational features include gyms (for basketball, volleyball, indoor soccer, etc.), fitness center with exercise equipment, and climbing wall. Swimmers head 2.1 miles to the year-round municipal swimming pool at Westover Park.

=== Athletics ===
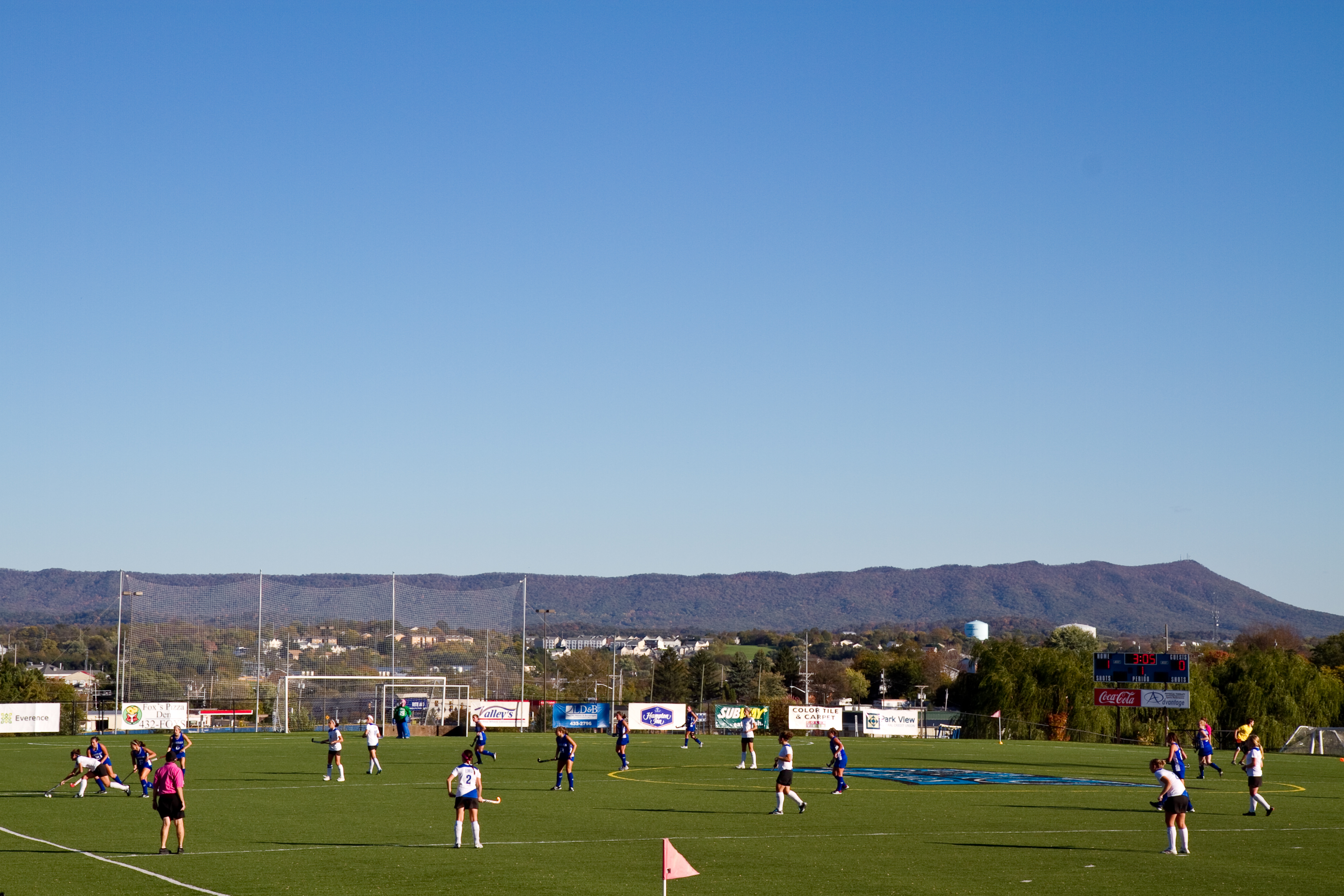
EMU Turf Field

EMU's sports teams are known as the Royals. In most sports, EMU competes as NCAA Division III, a member of the Old Dominion Athletic Conference. The school's intercollegiate sports include field hockey, cross country, basketball, volleyball, soccer, baseball, softball, indoor and outdoor track and field, women's lacrosse, and women's triathlon. The school offers disc golf as a club sport.

=== Extracurriculars ===
Two-thirds of EMU's students participate in intramural sports, playing against peers as well as college employees, in friendly, often coed competitions. In 2009–10, dozens of teams competed at various levels in basketball, billiards, floor hockey, flag football, golf, table tennis, and dodgeball.

Beyond physical activities, students at EMU are involved in clubs and groups typical of college campuses, such as student government, the student newspaper, literary magazine and theater productions.

=== Music ===
Students participate from a variety of choral and instrumental musical groups, including men's, women's, and mixed vocal ensembles, as well as chamber and wind ensembles, a jazz band, and a chamber orchestra. EMU's music department is home to the proficient hymnal editor, faculty member, and chamber singers director Ken J. Nafziger, who also directs and conducts the annual Shenandoah Valley Bach Festival and the Winchester Musica Viva.

== Notable alumni ==
- Kate Baer, '07, poet
- Emmanuel Bombande, MA '02 (in conflict transformation) – Executive director & co-founder of West Africa Network for Peacebuilding.
- Sam Gbaydee Doe, MA '98 – Liberian peace activist
- Leymah Gbowee, MA '07 – Liberian peace activist
- Ali Gohar, MA '02 – Scholar and restorative justice expert
- Merle Good '69 – Author and publisher
- Maven Huffman '98 – Professional wrestler
- Erik Kratz '02 – Former professional baseball player
- Donald Kraybill '67 – Author, lecturer, and researcher of Anabaptist faiths
- Hassan Sheikh Mohamud '01 – President of Somalia.
- Anthony Pratkanis '79 – Researcher, author, and consultant
- Larry Sheets '87 – Former major league baseball player
- Joseph Boyd Martin '59 – American neurobiologist and former dean of Harvard Medical School

== Notable faculty ==
- Hizkias Assefa – African conflict mediator
- Myron Augsburger '55, ThB '58 – Former president of EMU, evangelist, and author
- John Paul Lederach – Author and scholar
- Carol Ann Weaver – Composer, pianist, and writer
- Howard Zehr – Criminologist and expert on restorative justice
