= Thania Paffenholz =

Peace researcher and senior peace-process adviser

Dr. Thania Paffenholz
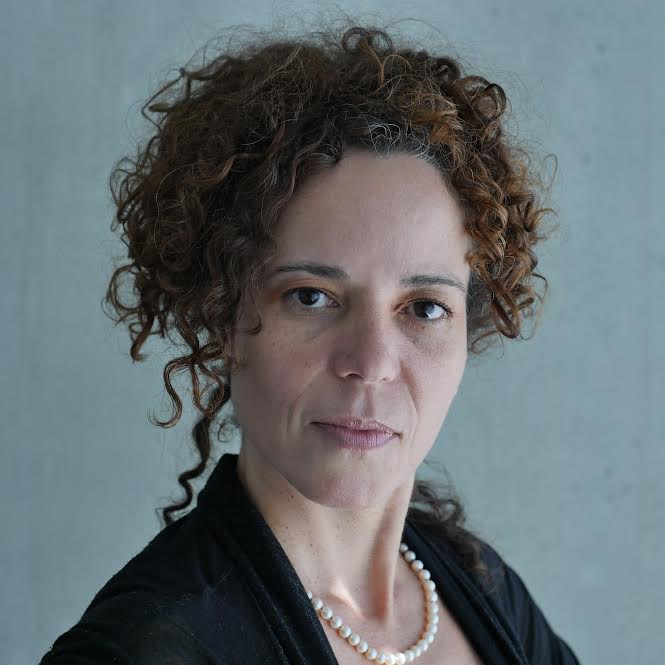
- Born: 1965 (age 60–61); Cologne, Germany
- Title: Founder and Senior Advisor, Inclusive Peace
- Awards: Wihuri International Prize (2015)

Academic background
- Education: Goethe University Frankfurt

Academic work
- Discipline: Political science, peacebuilding, conflict resolution
- Institutions: Inclusive Peace, Graduate Institute of International and Development Studies, swisspeace, Peace Research Institute Frankfurt, United Nations, European Union

Thania Paffenholz (born 1965) is a Swiss, German and Tanzanian peace researcher, mediator and senior peace-process adviser. Her work combines peace-process research, mediation and practical advisory support on inclusive peace processes and political transitions. Her research shifted the understanding of inclusion from the mere presence of civil society and women to their actual influence on negotiations, agreements and implementation.

She is the founder and former Director of Inclusive Peace, a Geneva-based organization providing research and advisory support for peace negotiations. She previously directed the Inclusive Peace and Transition Initiative as a Senior Researcher at the Graduate Institute of International and Development Studies in Geneva.

== Early career and peace-process work ==
Paffenholz received her Ph.D. in international relations from the Goethe University Frankfurt in 1996, focusing on mediation and conflict transformation. From 1992 to 1996, she was a research fellow at the Peace Research Institute Frankfurt in Germany. Between 1996 and 2000, she worked as a peacebuilding officer at the Delegation of the European Commission in Kenya, where she advised on the peace process in Somalia. She subsequently directed the Center for Peacebuilding at swisspeace in Bern until 2003.

== Research on civil society and inclusive peace processes ==
In 2006, Paffenholz co-authored the working paper Civil Society, Civic Engagement, and Peacebuilding for the World Bank, creating an analytical framework connecting civil society functions to peacebuilding outcomes.

From 2005 to 2010, she led a research project at the Graduate Institute of International and Development Studies, resulting in the publication of Civil Society & Peacebuilding: A Critical Assessment (2010). This project established an analytical framework identifying seven functions of civil society in peacebuilding: protection, monitoring, advocacy, socialization, social cohesion, facilitation, and service delivery. The research assessed each function's relevance and effectiveness across four stages of a conflict's trajectory: active war, ongoing armed conflict, periods when a window of opportunity for peace negotiations opens, and the aftermath of large-scale violence.

Between 2011 and 2015, she conducted a comparative analysis of 40 peace processes to evaluate the participation of civil society, political groups, and armed actors. The research demonstrated how the design of inclusion affects negotiations, agreements, and implementation, detailing the specific conditions under which included actors can exercise influence over the outcome of a peace agreement. She hosted a comparative qualitative database on these inclusive peace processes through her initiative at the Graduate Institute.

Drawing on the same comparative analysis of 40 peace and transition processes, Paffenholz also led research applying this distinction to women's participation specifically, identifying seven models through which women and other groups can take part in peace processes. These findings were distilled into the UN Women-commissioned report Making Women Count – Not Just Counting Women, and Paffenholz was among the contributors to the United Nations Global Study on the implementation of Security Council Resolution 1325.

== Perpetual peacebuilding ==
In a 2021 article, Paffenholz introduced the concept of "perpetual peacebuilding", framing peacebuilding as an open-ended, non-linear process rather than one with a fixed end point. Political scientist Maximilian Lakitsch has described the concept as centering on repeated cycles of negotiation and renegotiation of a society's social contract, with peace processes treated as ongoing efforts rather than judged as clear successes or failures.

== Advisory and mediation practice ==
Paffenholz balances direct involvement in mediation processes with wider peace-process support and advisory work. An African Union mediation handbook identifies her direct involvement in mediation processes in Mozambique, Angola, Somalia, Afghanistan, Nepal, and Sri Lanka. The World Bank records her wider support to peace processes in Mozambique, Angola, Somalia, Kenya, Uganda, South Sudan, Mali, Afghanistan, Nepal, Sri Lanka, Myanmar, Yemen, Egypt, El Salvador, Syria, and Colombia.

She advises the United Nations, the European Union, the OSCE, and the OECD/DAC on peace and security policies. In 2007, she contributed to the "Aid for Peace" approach, an evaluation tool for peacebuilding programs in conflict zones.

== Institutional leadership and Inclusive Peace ==
Paffenholz directed Inclusive Peace until December 2024, transitioning to a Senior Advisor role to focus on global networks. She serves as the Chief Field Editor of Frontiers in Political Science.

== Awards and recognition ==
The International Studies Association named Paffenholz the recipient of its 2026 Peace Studies Section Distinguished Scholar Award. In 2015, she received the Wihuri International Prize from the Jenny and Antti Wihuri Foundation for her work supporting peace and political transition processes.

== Public engagement ==
Paffenholz communicates peace-process research to wider audiences and provides media commentary on conflicts. Following the 2016 referendum in Colombia, she published analyses arguing the peace process had become tied to the national political cycle. She writes on the role of social media in conflict, noting its capacity to produce enemy images and deepen political polarization. She contributes to platforms and publications including TED, Scientific American, The Pioneer, Aargauer Zeitung, and Spektrum.de.

== Selected publications ==
- Reychler, Luc; Paffenholz, Thania, eds. (2000). Peacebuilding: A Field Guide. Lynne Rienner Publishers.
- Paffenholz, Thania; Spurk, Christoph (2006). Civil society, civic engagement, and peacebuilding (Report). World Bank.
- Paffenholz, Thania; Reychler, Luc (2007). Aid for Peace: A Guide to Planning and Assessment for Conflict Zones. Nomos Verlagsgesellschaft.
- Paffenholz, Thania, ed. (2010). Civil Society & Peacebuilding: A Critical Assessment. Lynne Rienner Publishers.
- Paffenholz, Thania (2014). "International Peacebuilding Goes Local: Analysing Lederach's Conflict Transformation Theory and its Ambivalent Encounter with 20 years of Practice". Peacebuilding. 2 (1): 11–27. doi:10.1080/21647259.2013.783257.
- Paffenholz, Thania (2014). "Civil Society and Peace Negotiations: Beyond the Inclusion-Exclusion Dichotomy". Negotiation Journal. 30 (1): 69–91. doi:10.1111/nejo.12046.
- Paffenholz, Thania (2015). "Unpacking the Local Turn in Peacebuilding: An Agenda for future research?". Third World Quarterly. 36 (5): 857–874. doi:10.1080/01436597.2015.1029908.
- Paffenholz, Thania (2021). "Perpetual Peacebuilding: A New Paradigm to Move Beyond the Linearity of Liberal Peacebuilding". Journal of Intervention and Statebuilding. 15 (3): 367–385. doi:10.1080/17502977.2021.1925423.
