= Lawrence S. Wittner =

American historian (born 1941)

Lawrence S. Wittner (born May 5, 1941, in Brooklyn, New York) is an American historian who has written extensively on peace movements, foreign policy, and economic inequality.

== Biography ==
He attended Columbia College (B.A., 1962), the University of Wisconsin (M.A. in history, 1963), and Columbia University (Ph.D. in history, 1967). Subsequently, he taught at Hampton Institute, at Vassar College, and—under the Fulbright program—at Japanese universities. In 1974, he began teaching at the State University of New York at Albany, where he rose to the rank of Professor of History before his retirement in 2010.

Wittner is the author of nine books, the editor or co-editor of another four, and the author of approximately 400 published articles and book reviews. From 1984 to 1987, he edited Peace & Change, a journal of peace research. His article "Peace Movements and Foreign Policy" won the Charles DeBenedetti award of the Conference on Peace Research in History in 1989, and his One World or None: A History of the World Nuclear Disarmament Movement Through 1953 received the Warren Kuehl Book Prize of the Society for Historians of American Foreign Relations in 1995. He received the New York State/United University Professions Excellence Award for scholarship, teaching, and service in 1990 and the Peace History Society's Lifetime Achievement Award in 2011.

A former president of the Council on Peace Research in History (now the Peace History Society), an affiliate of the American Historical Association, Wittner also chaired the Peace History Commission of the International Peace Research Association.

He has received major fellowships or grants from the American Council of Learned Societies, the Aspen Institute, the John D. and Catherine T. MacArthur Foundation, the National Endowment for the Humanities, and the United States Institute of Peace.

Wittner has spoken at the United Nations and at the Norwegian Nobel Institute, delivered guest lectures on dozens of college and university campuses (including Princeton University, Columbia University, Cornell University, Yale University, Harvard University, Rutgers University, the University of Colorado, the University of Wisconsin, American University, the University of Maine, the University of Connecticut, the University of Utah, the University of California at Berkeley, the University of New Mexico, Swarthmore College, the College of William and Mary, Colgate University, and the University of Alaska Southeast), and given talks in numerous countries (including Australia, Austria, Belgium, Britain, Canada, China, the Czech Republic, Finland, Germany, Japan, Malta, the Netherlands, Norway, South Africa, Spain, and Switzerland).

== Political activism ==
Starting in 1961, Wittner participated extensively in the racial equality, peace, and labor movements. He was an early civil rights and anti-apartheid activist and served for decades as an elected leader of United University Professions (the SUNY faculty-professional staff union affiliated with the American Federation of Teachers). He also served as a national board member (and eventually co-chair of the national board) of Peace Action and as an elected Bernie Sanders delegate to the 2016 Democratic National Convention. Numerous organizations presented him with awards for his activities. Currently, he is an executive board member of the Albany County Central Federation of Labor (AFL-CIO), as well as a board member of the Citizens for Global Solutions Education Fund and of the Peace Action Fund of New York State.

== Books by Wittner ==
- Rebels Against War: The American Peace Movement, 1941-1960. New York: Columbia University Press, 1969. Paperback edition, 1970. Revised, expanded edition published as: Rebels Against War: The American Peace Movement, 1933-1983. Philadelphia: Temple University Press, 1984. Paperback edition, 1984.
- (Editor) MacArthur. Englewood Cliffs, N.J.: Prentice-Hall, 1971. Paperback edition, 1971.
- Cold War America: From Hiroshima to Watergate. New York: Praeger Publishers, 1974. Paperback edition, 1974. Revised, expanded edition: Holt, Rinehart & Winston, 1978.
- American Intervention in Greece, 1943-1949. New York: Columbia University Press, 1982.
- (Associate Editor) Biographical Dictionary of Modern Peace Leaders. Westport, CN: Greenwood Press, 1985.
- One World or None: A History of the World Nuclear Disarmament Movement Through 1953. (Vol. 1 of The Struggle Against the Bomb.) Stanford, CA: Stanford University Press, 1993. Paperback edition, 1995.
- (Editor, with five others) Peace/Mir: An Anthology of Historic Alternatives to War. Syracuse, NY: Syracuse University Press, 1994. Paperback edition, 1994. Russian language edition: Mir/Peace. Al'ternativy voine ot Antichnosti do knotsa mirovoi voiny. Antologiia. Moscow: Nauka Press, 1993.
- Resisting the Bomb: A History of the World Nuclear Disarmament Movement, 1954-1970. (Vol. 2 of The Struggle Against the Bomb.) Stanford, CA: Stanford University Press, 1997. Paperback edition, 1997.
- Toward Nuclear Abolition: A History of the World Nuclear Disarmament Movement, 1971 to the Present. (Vol. 3 of The Struggle Against the Bomb.) Stanford, CA: Stanford University Press, 2003. Paperback edition, 2003.
- (Co-editor, with Glen H. Stassen) Peace Action: Past, Present, and Future. Boulder, CO: Paradigm Publishers, 2007. Paperback edition, 2007.
- Confronting the Bomb: A Short History of the World Nuclear Disarmament Movement. Stanford, CA: Stanford University Press, 2009. Paperback edition, 2009.
- Working for Peace and Justice: Memoirs of an Activist Intellectual. Knoxville, TN: University of Tennessee Press, 2012. Paperback edition, 2012.
- What's Going On at UAardvark? Albany, NY: Solidarity Press, 2013. Paperback edition, 2013. Second edition, 2014.

== See also ==
- List of peace activists

== General Reference ==
- Lawrence S. Wittner Papers, 1977-2020. M.E. Grenander Department of Special Collections and Archives, University Libraries, University at Albany, State University of New York (hereafter referred to as the Wittner Papers).
