= Fellow traveller =

Non-member supporters of an organization

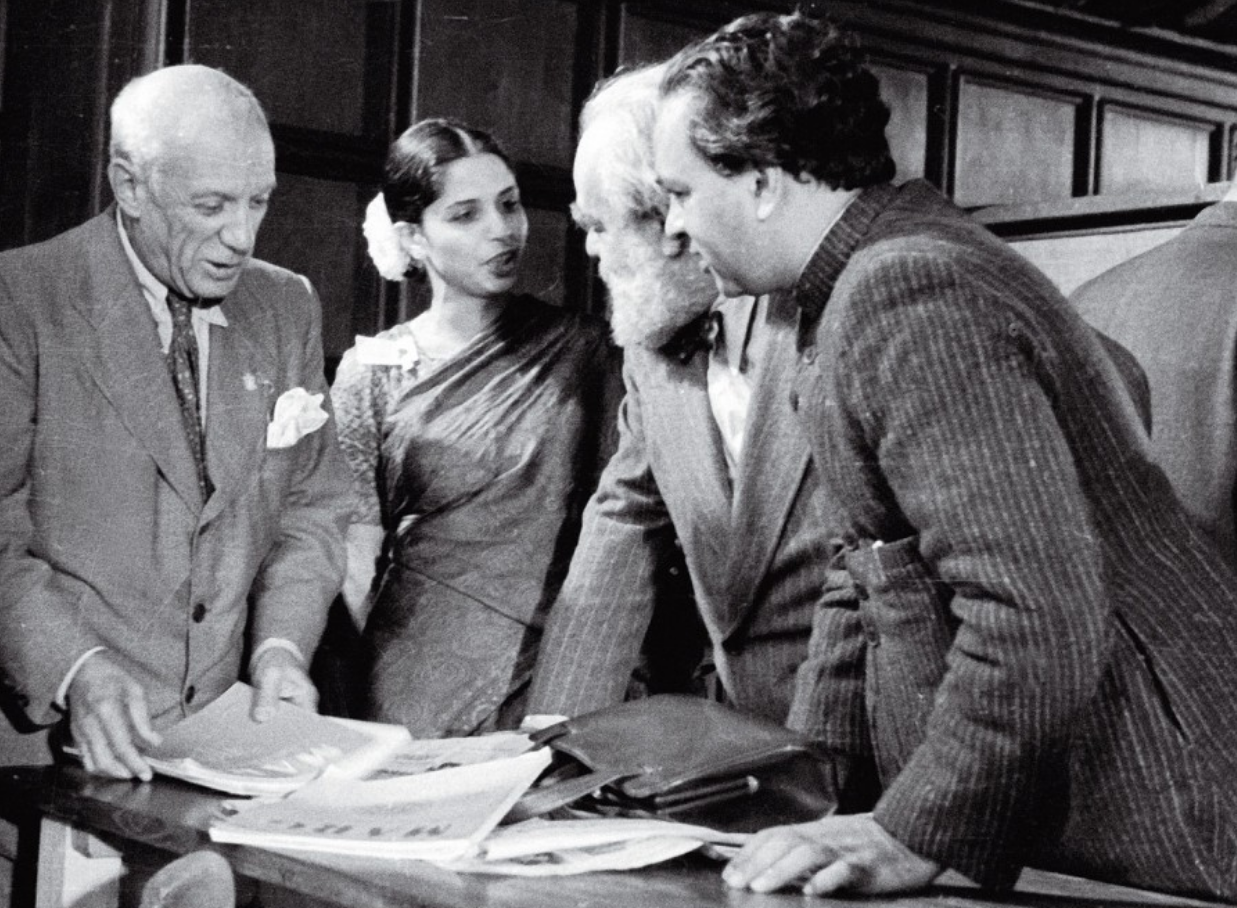
From left to right: Pablo Picasso, Minnette de Silva, Jo Davidson, and Mulk Raj Anand attending the World Congress of Intellectuals in Defense of Peace (Wrocław, Republic of Poland, 1948)

A fellow traveller (also fellow traveler) is a person who is intellectually sympathetic to the ideology of a political organization, and who co-operates in the organization's politics, without being a formal member. In the early history of the Soviet Union, the Bolshevik revolutionary and Soviet statesman Anatoly Lunacharsky coined the term poputchik ("one who travels the same path"); it was later popularized by Leon Trotsky to identify the vacillating intellectual supporters of the Bolshevik government led by Vladimir Lenin (1917–1924).

Historically, it was the political characterization of the Russian intelligentsiya (writers, academics, philosophers, and artists) who were philosophically sympathetic to the political, social, and economic goals of the Russian Revolution (1917) but who did not join the Communist Party of the Soviet Union (CPSU). The usage of the term poputchik disappeared from political discourse in the Soviet Union during the Stalinist era, but the Western world adopted the English term fellow traveller to identify people who sympathised with communism and the Soviets.

In U.S. politics, the term fellow traveller was primarily a pejorative applied to those on the American Left between the 1930s and 1950s, to suggest a person who was intellectually, philosophically, or politically sympathetic to the ideologies of Marxism, socialism, and communism, yet was not a formal "card-carrying member" of the Communist Party of the United States of America (CPUSA) or the Socialist Party of America (SPA). In political discourse, the term fellow traveller was applied to intellectuals, academics, and politicians who lent their names and prestige to communist front organizations during the Cold War. In European politics, the equivalent terms for fellow traveller were: compagnon de route and sympathisant in France; Weggenosse, Sympathisant (neutral), or Mitläufer (negative connotation) in West Germany; and compagno di strada in Italy.

== European usages ==
=== Soviet Union ===
In 1917, after the Russian Revolution, the Bolsheviks applied the term Poputchik ("one who travels the same path") to Russian writers who accepted the revolution, but who were not active revolutionaries. In the book Literature and Revolution (1923), Leon Trotsky popularized the usage of Poputchik as a political descriptor attributed to the pre-Revolutionary Russian Social Democratic Labour Party (the Social Democrats) to identify a vacillating political sympathizer. In Chapter 2, "The Literary 'Fellow-Travellers' of the Revolution", Trotsky said:

Between bourgeois Art, which is wasting away either in repetitions or in silences, and the new art which is as yet unborn, there is being created a transitional art, which is more or less organically connected with the Revolution, but which is not, at the same time, the Art of the Revolution. Boris Pilnyak, Vsevolod Ivanov, Nicolai Tikhonov, the Serapion Fraternity, Yesenin and his group of Imagists and, to some extent, Kliuev – all of them were impossible without the Revolution, either as a group or separately. ... They are not the artists of the proletarian Revolution, but her artist "fellow-travellers", in the sense in which this word was used by the old Socialists... As regards a "fellow-traveller", the question always comes up – How far will he go? This question cannot be answered in advance, not even approximately. The solution of it depends, not so much on the personal qualities of this or that "fellow-traveller", but mainly on the objective trend of things during the coming decade.

Victor Suvorov in his "Soviet military intelligence" (1984) referred to a less respectable term "shit-eaters" (Russian: говноед) used by the GRU handlers when talking about the category of foreign agents of influence who were conscious sympathisers of the Soviet movement:

In examining different kinds of agents, people from the free world who have sold themselves to the GRU, one cannot avoid touching on yet another category, perhaps the least appealing of all. Officially one is not allowed to call them agents, and they are not agents in the full sense of being recruited agents. We are talking about the numerous members of overseas societies of friendship with the Soviet Union. Officially, all Soviet representatives regard these parasites with touching feelings of friendship, but privately they call them 'shit-eaters' ('govnoed'). It is difficult to say where this expression originated, but it is truly the only name they deserve. The use of this word has become so firmly entrenched in Soviet embassies that it is impossible to imagine any other name for these people. A conversation might run as follows: Today we've got a friendship evening with shit-eaters', or Today we're having some shit-eaters to dinner. Prepare a suitable menu'.

— Victor Suvorov, Soviet Military Intelligence

=== Greece ===
For the term fellow traveller, the reactionary Régime of the Colonels (1967–1974) used the Greek word Synodiporia ("The ones walking the street together") as an umbrella term that described domestic Greek leftists and pro-democratic opponents of the military dictatorship; likewise, the military government used term Diethnis ("international Synodiporia") to identify the foreign supporters of the domestic anti-fascist Greeks.

== American usage ==
=== Interwar period ===
As in Europe during the Interwar period (1920s and 1930s), many American intellectuals either sympathized with or joined the Communist Party of the United States of America (CPUSA), who shared the political perspectives of communism in order to oppose the economic excesses of capitalism and fascism. The official manifesto of the CPUSA's founding convention (1919) declared that "communism does not propose to 'capture' the bourgeoisie parliamentary state, but to conquer and destroy it. [...] It is necessary that the proletariat organize its own state for the coercion and suppression of the bourgeoisie." Earl Russell Browder, its General Secretary since 1930, served as the party's unilateral leader and public face throughout his leadership—coinciding with the Great Depression and presidency of Franklin D. Roosevelt. The CPUSA's initial hostility to the New Deal resembled the theory of social fascism, attacking Roosevelt's policies in their 1934 manifesto while claiming Roosevelt's program to be "in political essence and direction [...] the same" as that of Adolf Hitler. Browder clarified in a 1933 pamphlet on social fascism that fascism in general was "the dictatorship of finance capital", and therefore Roosevelt and Hitler were the same in how "both are executives of finance capital". Browder also attacked the Socialist Party of America (SPA) and its 1932 presidential nominee Norman Thomas, accusing him of "cover[ing] up the class character of democracy by contrasting it with fascist dictatorship as if capitalist rule were not the essence of both", as well as "absolv[ing] the capitalist class of its fascist terror and mak[ing] it appear as a measure of self-defense against Communist provocation." Yet in 1935, coinciding with the 7th World Congress of the Comintern endorsing the popular front strategy, Browder in turn endorsed the New Deal, and described the political situation as between democracy and fascism, rather than socialism and capitalism.

In 1936, the newspaper columnist Max Lerner included the term fellow traveller in the article "Mr. Roosevelt and His Fellow Travelers" (The Nation). In the United States, the European term fellow traveller was adapted to describe persons politically sympathetic to, but not members of, the American Communist Party. In the 1920s and 1930s, the political, social, and economic problems in American society and throughout the world, caused partly by the Great Depression in the United States, motivated idealistic young people, students, artists, industrial syndicalists, labor unionists, philosophers, social critics, and intellectuals to become sympathetic to the communist cause, in hope they could overthrow capitalism and stop the exploitation of workers. To that end, black Americans joined the CPUSA (1919) because some of their politically liberal stances (e.g. legal racial equality) corresponded to the political struggles of black people for civil rights and social justice, in the time when Jim Crow laws established and maintained racial segregation throughout the United States. Moreover, the American League for Peace and Democracy (ALPD) was the principal socio-political group who actively worked by anti-fascism rather than by pacifism; as such, the ALPD was the most important organization within the U.S. popular front, a pro-Soviet coalition of anti-fascist political organizations.

Among the American writers and intellectuals known as fellow-travellers were Ernest Hemingway and Theodore Dreiser, novelists whose works of fiction occasionally were critical of capitalism and its excesses, whilst John Dos Passos, a known left-winger, moved to the political right and became a staunch anti-communist. In 1938, Joseph Brown Matthews Sr. featured the term in the title of his political biography Odyssey of a Fellow Traveler (1938); later, Matthews Sr. became the chief investigator for the anti-communist activities of the House Un-American Activities Committee (HUAC). Robert E. Stripling also credited Matthews: "J.B. Matthews, a former Communist fellow traveler (and, incidentally, the originator of that apt tag)..."

Likewise, the editor of The New Republic magazine, Malcolm Cowley, had been a fellow traveller during the 1930s but broke away from the American Communist Party (CPUSA) because of the ideological contradictions inherent to the Molotov–Ribbentrop Pact (Treaty of Non-aggression between Germany and the Union of Soviet Socialist Republics, 23 August 1939) signed by Joseph Stalin and Adolf Hitler. The novelist and critic Waldo Frank was a fellow traveller during the mid-1930s, and became the chairman of the League of American Writers in 1935 but was ousted as such in 1937, when he called for an enquiry to the reasons for Stalin's Great Purges in the Soviet Union (1936–1938).

From 1934 to 1939, American historian and intellectual Richard Hofstadter briefly was a member of the Young Communist League USA. Despite his disillusionment due to the German–Soviet Non-aggression Pact between Nazi Germany and the Soviet Union (August 1939), and the ideological rigidity of the Soviet communist party-line, Hofstadter remained a fellow traveller until the 1940s. In Who Owns History?: Rethinking the Past in a Changing World (2003), American historian Eric Foner said that Hofstatdter continued thinking of himself as a political radical, because his opposition to capitalism was the reason he had joined the CPUSA.

In the elegiac article "The Revolt of the Intellectuals" (Time, 6 January 1941), American journalist and spy Whittaker Chambers, a former member of the Workers Party of America (WPA), satirically used the term fellow traveler:

As the Red Express hooted off into the shades of a closing decade, ex-fellow travelers rubbed their bruises, wondered how they had ever come to get aboard. […] With the exception of Granville Hicks, probably none of these people was a Communist. They were fellow travelers who wanted to help fight fascism.

=== World War II and post-war period ===
In the late 1930s, most fellow-travellers in the West broke with the communist party-line of Moscow when Joseph Stalin and Adolf Hitler signed the German–Soviet Non-aggression Pact (August 1939), which allowed the Occupation of Poland for partitioning the country's territories between the Soviet Union and Nazi Germany (1939–1945). In the United States, the American Communist Party (CPUSA) abided by Stalin's official party-line, and denounced the Allies, rather than Nazi Germany, as warmongers. At its peak in 1942, during the U.S. entry into World War II, the American Communist Party officially had 85,000 registered members.

In the aftermath of World War II, the Cold War emerged between the United States and the Soviet Union during the 1947–1948 period, and American communists found themselves at the political margins of U.S. society—being forced out of the leadership of trade unions, for example—and membership to the CPUSA markedly declined. Nonetheless, in 1948 American communists campaigned for the presidential run of Henry A. Wallace, former Vice President of the United States under Franklin D. Roosevelt and the Progressive Party's candidate in the 1948 U.S. presidential election.

In February 1956, CPSU First Secretary Nikita Khrushchev delivered the "Secret Speech" On the Cult of Personality and Its Consequences to the 20th Congress of the Communist Party of the Soviet Union, officially denouncing Stalinism and Joseph Stalin's cult of personality to his fellow party members; as a consequence, those political revelations ended the ideological relationship between many fellow-travellers in the West and the Soviet version of communism.

==== McCarthy Era ====
In 1945, the anti-communist congressional House Committee on Un-American Activities (HUAC) became a permanent committee of the U.S. Congress. In 1953, after the Republican Senator Joseph McCarthy became chairman of the U.S. Senate Homeland Security Permanent Subcommittee on Investigations (PSI), they attempted to determine the extent of Soviet influence in the U.S. government, and in the social, cultural, and political institutions of American society.

The McCarthy Era (1947–1959) was a period of moral panic and political witch hunts, characterized by right-wing political orthodoxy and anti-progressive patriotism. Some targets of investigation were created by way of anonymous and unfounded accusations of treason and subversion, during which time the term fellow traveller was applied as a political pejorative against many American citizens in the United States, as well as Japanese nationals in U.S.-occupied Japan, who were suspected to be Soviet spies, affiliates to the American Communist Party (CPUSA), or who did not outright condemn communism.

In the course of his political career, McCarthy claimed at various times that there were many U.S. citizens (secretly and publicly) sympathetic to communism and the Soviet Union who worked in the American public sector, State Department, and the U.S. Army, in positions of trust incompatible with such beliefs. In response to such ideological threats to U.S. national security, some American citizens with current or past militancy in communist organizations were suspected of being "un-American", and thus secretly and anonymously registered to a blacklist by their peers, and so denied employment and the opportunity to earn a living, despite many such acknowledged ex-communists moving on from the fellow traveller stage of their political lives, such as the Hollywood blacklist.

== Contemporary usage ==
The New Fontana Dictionary of Modern Thought (1999, Third edition) defines the term fellow-traveller as a post-revolutionary political term derived from the Russian word poputchik, with which the Bolsheviks described political sympathizers who hesitated to publicly support the Communist Party of the Soviet Union (CPSU) and Soviet communism after the October Revolution of 1917.

The New Shorter Oxford English Dictionary (1993) defines the term fellow-traveller as "a non-Communist who sympathizes with the aims and general policies of the Communist Party"; and, by transference, as a "person who sympathizes with, but is not a member of another party or movement".

Safire's Political Dictionary (1978) defines the term fellow traveller as a man or a woman "who accepted most Communist doctrine, but was not a member of the Communist party"; and, in contemporary usage, defines the term fellow traveller as a person "who agrees with a philosophy or group, but does not publicly work for it."

The Russian word "sputnik" (спутник) also translates, literally (s=with + put=path + nik=a (male) person, thus "someone travelling the same path") as "fellow traveller", though English speakers generally interpret it as meaning "satellite".

== See also ==
- Agent of influence
- American Left
- Anti-Americanism
- Anti-Stalinist left
- Capitalist roader
- Fellow Travelers (miniseries)
- Fifth column
- Fraternal party
- French Left
- Historiography in the Soviet Union
- History of the Communist Party USA
  - Communist Party USA and African Americans
  - Communist Party USA and American labor movement (1919–1937)
  - Communist Party USA and American labor movement (1937–1950)
  - List of Communist Party USA members who have held office in the United States
- List of anti-war organizations
- List of peace activists
- Mitläufer (fellow-traveller of the Nazis)
- Pinko
- Post–World War II anti-fascism
- Putinversteher
- Revolutions of 1917–1923
- Timeline of the Cold War
  - Cold War (1947–1948)
  - Cold War (1948–1953)
  - Cold War (1953–1962)
- Seattle Commune in the Soviet Union
- Tankie
- Useful idiot
- Western Marxism
- White émigré

== Bibliography ==
- Baker, Susan S. (1985). Radical Beginnings: Richard Hofstadter and the 1930s. Contributions in American History. Vol. 112 (1st ed.). Westport, Connecticut: Praeger Publishers. ISBN 9780313247132.
- Browder, Earl R. (1933). The meaning of social-fascism: Its historical and theoretical background. New York City: Workers Library Publishers.
- Browder, Earl R. (1937). "Speech of Earl Browder: Second Congress of American Writers". Vol. 14, no. 135. New York City: Daily Worker.
- Browder, Earl R. (1935). "What Is Communism? 8. Americanism—Who Are the Americans?" (PDF). New Masses. New York City: Communist Party USA – via Marxists Internet Archive.
- Dimitrov, Georgi (1935). The united front against fascism and war. New York City: Workers Library Publishers.
- Isserman, Maurice (1982). Which Side Were You On? The American Communist Party During the Second World War. Middletown, Connecticut: Wesleyan University Press. ISBN 978-0252063367.
- Jaffe, Philip J. (1975). The Rise and Fall of American Communism. New York City: Horizon Press. ISBN 978-0818008177.
- Klehr, Harvey; Haynes, John E. (2008) [1999]. "The American Communist Party Underground". Venona: Decoding Soviet Espionage in America (Reprint ed.). New Haven, Connecticut: Yale University Press. pp. 57–92. doi:10.12987/9780300129878-007. ISBN 9780300129878. JSTOR j.ctt1npk87.9.
- Klehr, Harvey; Haynes, John E.; Anderson, Kyrill M. (1998). The Soviet World of American Communism. New Haven, Connecticut: Yale University Press. ISBN 978-0300138009.
- Rossinow, Doug (March 2004). ""The Model of a Model Fellow Traveler": Harry F. Ward, the American League for Peace and Democracy, and the"Russian Question" in American Politics, 1933–1956". Peace & Change. 29 (2). Chichester, West Sussex: Wiley-Blackwell for the Peace History Society and the Peace and Justice Studies Association. doi:10.1111/j.1468-0130.2004.00288.x. ISSN 1468-0130.
- Ryan, James G. (2005). Earl Browder: The Failure of American Communism (2nd ed.). Tuscaloosa, Alabama: University of Alabama Press. ISBN 978-0817351991.
- Saba, Paul, ed. (1979). "The Roots of Browderism" (PDF). www.marxists.org. Marxists Internet Archive.
- Schepers, Emile (September 14, 2020). "Communists, coalitions, and the class struggle". www.cpusa.org. Communist Party USA.
- Warren, Frank A. (1993). Liberals and communism: the "red decade" revisited. New York City: Columbia University Press. OL 1406922M.
