= Nonviolence =

Principle or practice of not causing harm to others

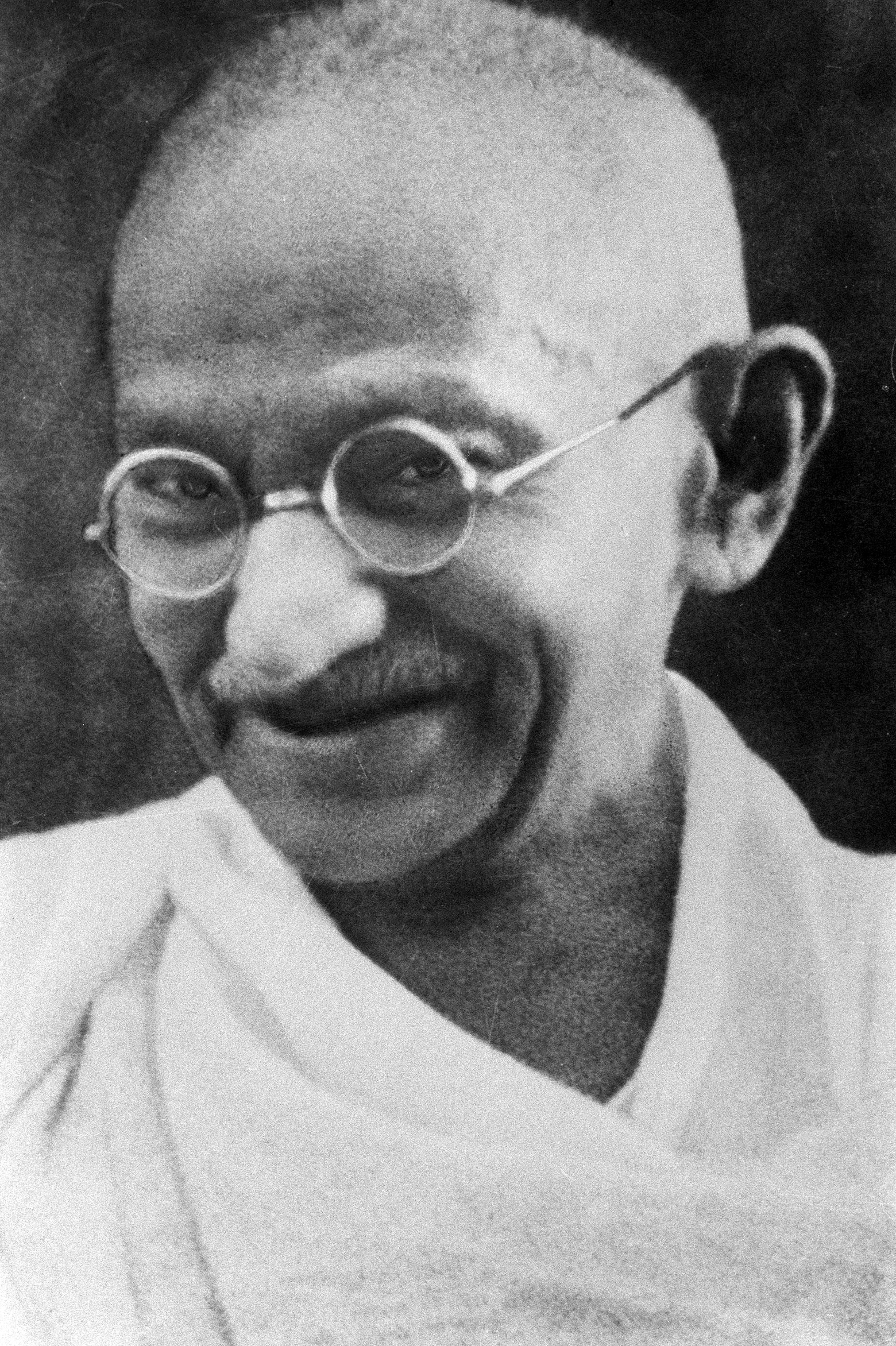
Mahatma Gandhi, often considered a founder of the modern nonviolence movement, spread the concept of ahimsa through his movements and writings, which then inspired other nonviolent activists.

Nonviolence is the practice of working for social change without causing harm to others, under any condition. It may come from the belief that hurting people, animals and/or the environment is unnecessary to achieve an outcome, and it may refer to a general philosophy of abstention from violence. It may be based on moral, religious or spiritual principles. The reasons for it may be strategic or pragmatic; failure to distinguish between the two can lead to distortion in the concept's meaning and effectiveness, which can subsequently result in confusion. Although both principled and pragmatic nonviolent approaches preach for nonviolence, they may have distinct motives, goals, philosophies, and techniques. However, rather than debating the best practice between the two approaches, both can indicate alternative paths for those who do not want to use violence.

Nonviolence has "active" or "activist" elements, in that believers generally accept the need for nonviolence as a means to achieve political and social change. Thus, for example, Tolstoyan and Gandhian philosophies on nonviolence seek social change while rejecting the use of violence, seeing nonviolent action (also called civil resistance) as an alternative to either passive acceptance of oppression or armed struggle against it. In general, advocates of an activist philosophy of nonviolence use diverse methods in their campaigns for social change, including critical forms of education and persuasion, mass noncooperation, civil disobedience, nonviolent direct action, constructive program, and social, political, cultural and economic forms of intervention.

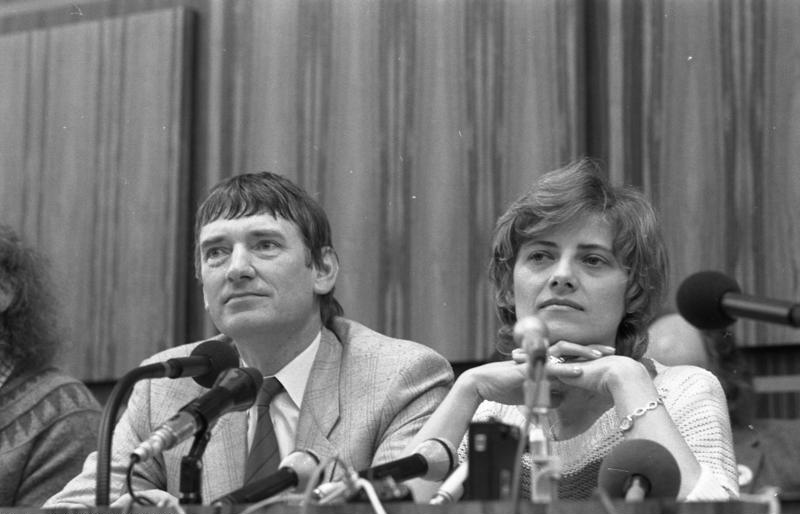
Petra Kelly (right) founded the German Green Party on nonviolence.

In modern times, nonviolent methods have been a powerful tool for social protest and revolutionary social and political change. There are many examples of their use. Fuller surveys may be found in the entries on civil resistance, nonviolent resistance and nonviolent revolution. Certain movements which were particularly influenced by a philosophy of nonviolence have included Mahatma Gandhi's leadership of a successful decades-long nonviolent struggle for Indian independence, Martin Luther King Jr.'s and James Bevel's adoption of Gandhi's nonviolent methods in their Civil rights movement campaigns to remove legalized segregation in America, and César Chávez's campaigns of nonviolence in the 1960s to protest the treatment of Mexican farm workers in California. The 1989 "Velvet Revolution" in Czechoslovakia that saw the overthrow of the Communist government is considered one of the most important of the largely nonviolent Revolutions of 1989. Most recently the nonviolent campaigns of Leymah Gbowee and the women of Liberia were able to achieve peace after a 14-year civil war. This story is captured in a 2008 documentary film Pray the Devil Back to Hell.

The term "nonviolence" is often linked with peace or used as a synonym for it. Despite the fact that it is frequently equated with pacifism, this equation is at times rejected by nonviolent advocates and activists. Nonviolence specifically refers to the absence of violence and the choice to do no harm in deed, speech, or intent. For example, if a house is burning down with mice or insects in it, the nonviolent action is to put the fire out, not to sit by passively and let the fire burn.

== Origins ==
Nonviolence or ahimsa is one of the cardinal virtues and an important tenet of Jainism, Buddhism, and Hinduism. Jain and Buddhist thoughts have explored nonviolence very deeply, not limiting it to humans but extending it to the animal world as well as nature, in a very explicit fashion. In Jainism, it is the very core idea of very 'way of life' practicing it in mun (thoughts), vachan (spoken word) and karm (action). It is a multidimensional concept, inspired by the premise that all living beings have the spark of the divine spiritual energy; therefore, to hurt another being is to hurt oneself. It has also been related to the notion that any violence has karmic consequences. While ancient scholars of Hinduism pioneered and over time perfected the principles of ahimsa, the concept reached an extraordinary status in the ethical philosophy of Jainism.

== Forms of nonviolence ==
In the political realm, advocates of nonviolent action believe cooperation and consent are the roots of civil or political power: all regimes, including bureaucratic institutions, financial institutions, and the armed segments of society (such as the military and police); depend on compliance from citizens. On a national level, the strategy of nonviolent action seeks to challenge the power misuse of rulers by organising and encouraging (oppressed) people to withdraw their consent and cooperation. The forms of nonviolence draw inspiration from both religious or ethical beliefs and political analysis. Religious or ethically based nonviolence is sometimes referred to as principled, philosophical, or ethical nonviolence, while nonviolence based on political analysis is often referred to as tactical, strategic, or pragmatic nonviolent action. Commonly, both of these dimensions may be present within the thinking of particular movements or individuals.

=== Pragmatic ===
The fundamental concept of pragmatic (tactical or strategic) nonviolent action is to create a social dynamic or political movement that can project a national and global dialogue that affects social change without necessarily winning over those who wish to maintain the status quo. Gene Sharp promoted the pragmatic nonviolence approach. Sharp was an American political scientist known for his nonviolent struggle work. Those who follow Sharp's pragmatic nonviolence approach believe in practicality rather than the moral aspect of the struggle. They believe that violence is too costly to engage in. The goals are to change their oppressor's behavior, end a specific injustice or violent situation, and seek a win for themselves, while opponents they perceive as enemies with conflicting interests should lose. Conflict is seen as inevitable, and the rejection of violence is an effective way to challenge power. Those who follow pragmatic nonviolence ideology are willing to engage in nonviolent coercion, and try to avoid suffering.

Nicolas Walter noted the idea that nonviolence might work "runs under the surface of Western political thought without ever quite disappearing". Walter noted Étienne de La Boétie's Discourse on Voluntary Servitude (sixteenth century) and P.B. Shelley's The Masque of Anarchy (1819) contain arguments for resisting tyranny without using violence. In 1838, William Lloyd Garrison helped found the New England Non-Resistance Society, a society devoted to achieving racial and gender equality through the rejection of all violent actions.

In modern industrial democracies, nonviolent action has been used extensively by political sectors without mainstream political power such as labor, peace, environment and women's movements. Lesser known is the role that nonviolent action has played and continues to play in undermining the power of repressive political regimes in the developing world and the former eastern bloc. Susan Ives emphasizes this point by quoting Walter Wink:

"In 1989, thirteen nations comprising 1,695,000,000 people experienced nonviolent revolutions that succeeded beyond anyone's wildest expectations [...] If we add all the countries touched by major nonviolent actions in our century (the Philippines, South Africa [...] the independence movement in India [...]), the figure reaches 3,337,400,000, a staggering 65% of humanity! All this in the teeth of the assertion, endlessly repeated, that nonviolence doesn't work in the 'real' world."

— Walter Wink, Christian theologian

As a technique for social struggle, nonviolent action has been described as "the politics of ordinary people", reflecting its historically mass-based use by populations throughout the world and history.

Movements most often associated with nonviolence are the non-cooperation campaign for Indian independence led by Mahatma Gandhi, the Civil Rights Movement in the United States, and the People Power Revolution in the Philippines.

Also of primary significance is the notion that just means are the most likely to lead to just ends. When Gandhi said that "the means may be likened to the seed, the end to a tree," he expressed the philosophical kernel of what some refer to as prefigurative politics. Martin Luther King Jr., a student of Gandhian nonviolent resistance, concurred with this tenet, concluding that "nonviolence demands that the means we use must be as pure as the ends we seek." Proponents of nonviolence reason that the actions taken in the present inevitably re-shape the social order in like form. They would argue, for instance, that it is fundamentally irrational to use violence to achieve a peaceful society.

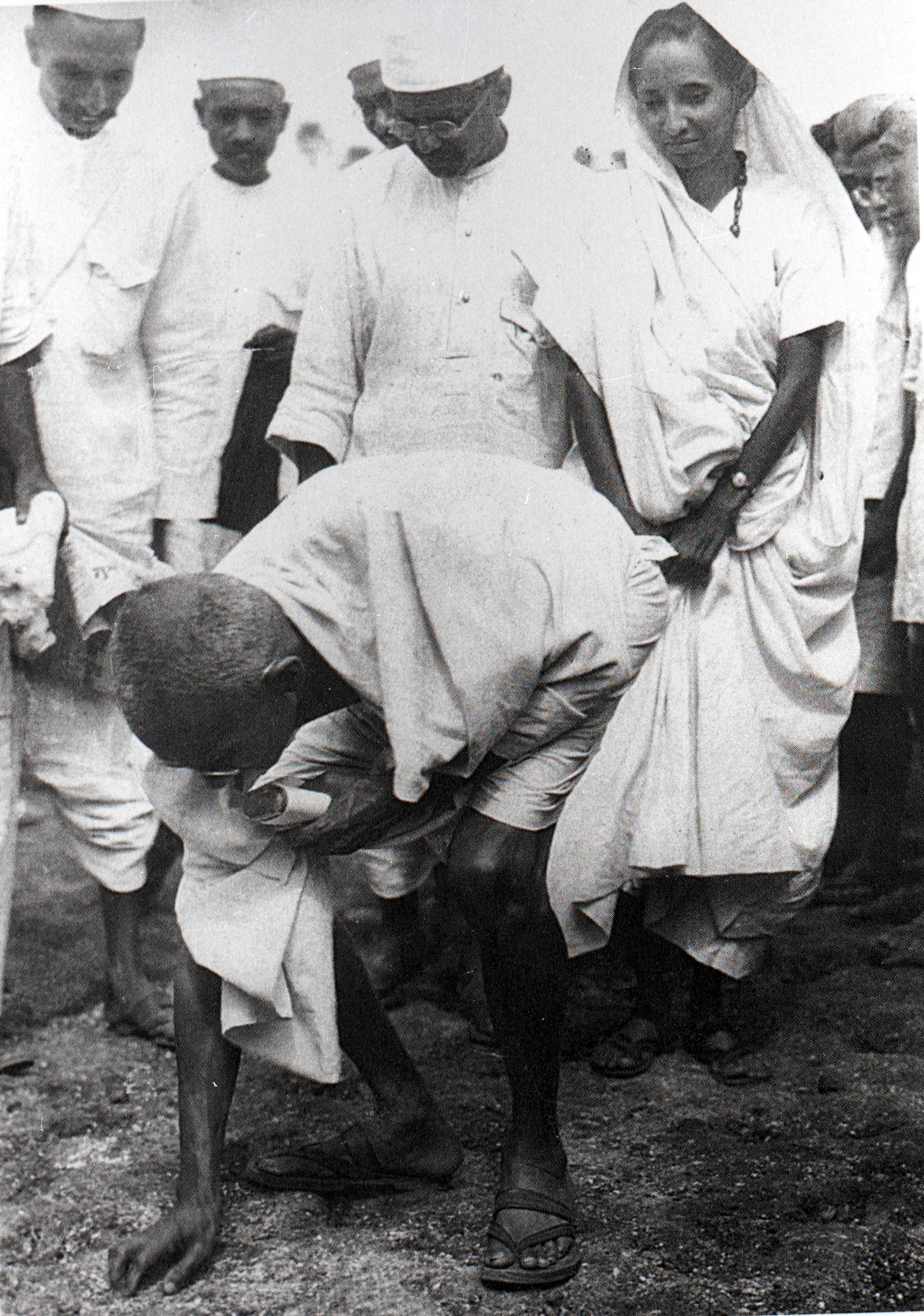
Gandhi famously advocated for the Indian independence movement to strictly adhere to the principles of nonviolence.

Respect or love for opponents also has a pragmatic justification, in that the technique of separating the deeds from the doers allows for the possibility of the doers changing their behaviour, and perhaps their beliefs. Martin Luther King Jr. wrote, "Nonviolent resistance... avoids not only external physical violence but also internal violence of spirit. The nonviolent resister not only refuses to shoot his opponent, but he also refuses to hate him."

Nonviolence has obtained a level of institutional recognition and endorsement at the global level. On November 10, 1998, the United Nations General Assembly proclaimed the first decade of the 21st century and the third millennium, the years 2001 to 2010, as the International Decade for the Promotion of a Culture of Peace and Non-Violence for the Children of the World.

=== Principled ===
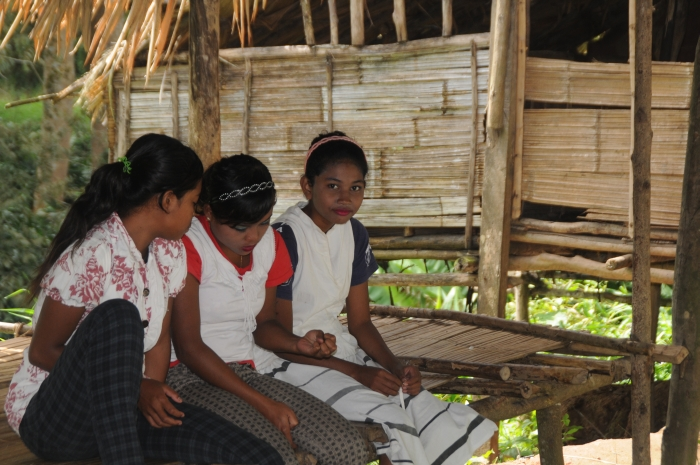
The Semai have a principle called punan, which incorporates nonviolence.

The nonviolence approach involves accepting that violence is wrong and nonviolence is the best ethical response to any conflict. The followers of this approach believe in human harmony and a moral rejection of violence and coercion. They accept the total commitment to nonviolence and encourage those who want to use nonviolent actions to reject all forms of violence and coercion. Principled nonviolence has a religious or ideological basis. This type of nonviolence aims to change the opponent's heart and mind by showing love to them rather than hatred, partnering with the opponents to bring about social change by ending all violence and social injustices, and seeking a solution whereby all parties win. The techniques they use include persuasion while trying to avoid coercion, and they accept that suffering is part of the means to transform themselves and others.

For many, practicing nonviolence goes deeper than abstaining from violent behavior or words. It means overriding the impulse to be hateful and holding love for everyone, even those with whom one strongly disagrees. In this view, because violence is learned, it is necessary to unlearn violence by practicing love and compassion at every possible opportunity. For some, the commitment to non-violence entails a belief in restorative or transformative justice, an abolition of the death penalty and other harsh punishments. This may involve the necessity of caring for those who are violent.

Nonviolence, for many, involves a respect and reverence for all sentient, and perhaps even non-sentient, beings. This might include abolitionism against animals as property, the practice of not eating animal products or by-products (vegetarianism or veganism), spiritual practices of non-harm to all beings, and caring for the rights of all beings. Mahatma Gandhi, James Bevel, and other nonviolent proponents advocated vegetarianism as part of their nonviolent philosophy. Buddhists extend this respect for life to animals and plants, while Jainism extend this respect for life to animals, plants and even small organisms such as insects. The classical Indian text of the Tirukkuṛaḷ, which is believed to be of Hindu or Jain origin, decrees ahimsa and moral vegetarianism as the most fundamental of all personal virtues. These ideas can also be found in Western mystical and Neoplatonic traditions.

In modern times, several scholars have endeavored to clarify the theoretical intellectual foundations for principled nonviolence and the manner in which such principles might be implemented in practical terms. Included among them are Kevin P. Clements and Robert L. Holmes.

Mahatma Gandhi was one of the most well-known advocates for and practitioners of principled nonviolence.

==== Semai people ====
The Semai ethnic group living in the center of the Malay Peninsula in Southeast Asia are known for their nonviolence. The Semai punan ethical or religious principle strongly pressures members of the culture towards nonviolent, non-coercive, and non-competitive behaviour. It has been suggested that the Semai's non-violence is a response to historic threats from slaving states; as the Semai were constantly defeated by slavers and Malaysian immigrants, they preferred to flee rather than fight and thus evolved into a general norm of non-violence. This does not mean the Semai are incapable of violence however; during the Malayan Emergency, the British enlisted some Semai to fight against MNLA insurgents and according to Robert Knox Dentan the Semai believe that as Malaysia industrialises, it will be harder for the Semai to use their strategy of fleeing and they will have to fight instead.

=== Religious ===
==== Hinduism ====
===== Ancient Vedic texts =====
Ahimsa as an ethical concept evolved in Vedic texts. The oldest scripts, along with discussing ritual animal sacrifices, indirectly mention Ahimsa, but do not emphasise it. Over time, the Hindu scripts revise ritual practices and the concept of Ahimsa is increasingly refined and emphasised, ultimately Ahimsa becomes the highest virtue by the late Vedic era (about 500 BCE). For example, hymn 10.22.25 in the Rig Veda uses the words Satya (truthfulness) and Ahimsa in a prayer to deity Indra; later, the Yajur Veda dated to be between 1000 BCE and 600 BCE, states, "may all beings look at me with a friendly eye, may I do likewise, and may we look at each other with the eyes of a friend".

The term Ahimsa appears in the text Taittiriya Shakha of the Yajurveda (TS 5.2.8.7), where it refers to non-injury to the sacrificer himself. It occurs several times in the Shatapatha Brahmana in the sense of "non-injury". The Ahimsa doctrine is a late Vedic era development in Brahmanical culture. The earliest reference to the idea of non-violence to animals ("pashu-Ahimsa"), apparently in a moral sense, is in the Kapisthala Katha Samhita of the Yajurveda (KapS 31.11), which may have been written in about the 8th century BCE.

Bowker states the word appears but is uncommon in the principal Upanishads. Kaneda gives examples of the word Ahimsa in these Upanishads. Other scholars suggest Ahimsa as an ethical concept that started evolving in the Vedas, becoming an increasingly central concept in Upanishads.

The Chāndogya Upaniṣad, dated to the 8th or 7th century BCE, one of the oldest Upanishads, has the earliest evidence for the Vedic era use of the word Ahimsa in the sense familiar in Hinduism (a code of conduct). It bars violence against "all creatures" (sarvabhuta) and the practitioner of Ahimsa is said to escape from the cycle of rebirths (CU 8.15.1). Some scholars state that this 8th or 7th-century BCE mention may have been an influence of Jainism on Vedic Hinduism. Others scholar state that this relationship is speculative, and though Jainism is an ancient tradition the oldest traceable texts of Jainism tradition are from many centuries after the Vedic era ended.

Chāndogya Upaniṣad also names Ahimsa, along with Satyavacanam (truthfulness), Arjavam (sincerity), Danam (charity), Tapo (penance/meditation), as one of five essential virtues (CU 3.17.4).

The Sandilya Upanishad lists ten forbearances: Ahimsa, Satya, Asteya, Brahmacharya, Daya, Arjava, Kshama, Dhriti, Mitahara and Saucha. According to Kaneda, the term Ahimsa is an important spiritual doctrine shared by Hinduism, Buddhism and Jainism. It literally means 'non-injury' and 'non-killing'. It implies the total avoidance of harming of any kind of living creatures not only by deeds, but also by words and in thoughts.

===== The Epics =====
The Mahabharata, one of the epics of Hinduism, has multiple mentions of the phrase Ahimsa Paramo Dharma (अहिंसा परमॊ धर्मः), which literally means: non-violence is the highest moral virtue. For example, Mahaprasthanika Parva has the verse:

अहिंसा परमो धर्मस् तथाहिंसा परो दमः।
अहिंसा परमं दानम् अहिंसा परमस् तपः।
अहिंसा परमो यज्ञस् तथाहिंसा परं बलम्।
अहिंसा परमं मित्रम् अहिंसा परमं सुखम्।
अहिंसा परमं सत्यम् अहिंसा परमं श्रुतम्॥

The above passage from Mahabharata emphasises the cardinal importance of Ahimsa in Hinduism, and literally means: Ahimsa is the highest virtue, Ahimsa is the highest self-control, Ahimsa is the greatest gift, Ahimsa is the best suffering, Ahimsa is the highest sacrifice, Ahimsa is the finest strength, Ahimsa is the greatest friend, Ahimsa is the greatest happiness, Ahimsa is the highest truth, and Ahimsa is the greatest teaching. Some other examples where the phrase Ahimsa Paramo Dharma are discussed include Adi Parva, Vana Parva and Anushasana Parva. The Bhagavad Gita, among other things, discusses the doubts and questions about appropriate response when one faces systematic violence or war. These verses develop the concepts of lawful violence in self-defence and the theories of just war. However, there is no consensus on this interpretation. Gandhi, for example, considers this debate about nonviolence and lawful violence as a mere metaphor for the internal war within each human being, when he or she faces moral questions.

===== Self-defence, criminal law, and war =====
The classical texts of Hinduism devote numerous chapters discussing what people who practice the virtue of Ahimsa, can and must do when they are faced with war, violent threat or need to sentence someone convicted of a crime. These discussions have led to theories of just war, theories of reasonable self-defence and theories of proportionate punishment. Arthashastra discusses, among other things, why and what constitutes proportionate response and punishment.

War

The precepts of Ahimsa under Hinduism require that war must be avoided, with sincere and truthful dialogue. Force must be the last resort. If war becomes necessary, its cause must be just, its purpose virtuous, its objective to restrain the wicked, its aim peace, its method lawful. War can only be started and stopped by a legitimate authority. Weapons used must be proportionate to the opponent and the aim of war, not indiscriminate tools of destruction. All strategies and weapons used in the war must be to defeat the opponent, not designed to cause misery to the opponent; for example, use of arrows is allowed, but use of arrows smeared with painful poison is not allowed. Warriors must use judgment in the battlefield. Cruelty to the opponent during war is forbidden. Wounded, unarmed opponent warriors must not be attacked or killed, they must be brought to your realm and given medical treatment. Children, women and civilians must not be injured. While the war is in progress, sincere dialogue for peace must continue.

Self-defence

In matters of self-defence, different interpretations of ancient Hindu texts have been offered. For example, Tähtinen suggests self-defence is appropriate, criminals are not protected by the rule of Ahimsa, and Hindu scriptures support the use of violence against an armed attacker. Ahimsa is not meant to imply pacifism.

Alternate theories of self-defence, inspired by Ahimsa, build principles similar to theories of just war. Aikido, pioneered in Japan, illustrates one such principles of self-defence. Morihei Ueshiba, the founder of Aikido, described his inspiration as Ahimsa. According to this interpretation of Ahimsa in self-defence, one must not assume that the world is free of aggression. One must presume that some people will, out of ignorance, error or fear, attack other persons or intrude into their space, physically or verbally. The aim of self-defence, suggested Ueshiba, must be to neutralise the aggression of the attacker, and avoid the conflict. The best defence is one where the victim is protected, as well as the attacker is respected and not injured if possible. Under Ahimsa and Aikido, there are no enemies, and appropriate self-defence focuses on neutralising the immaturity, assumptions and aggressive strivings of the attacker.

Criminal law

Tähtinen concludes that Hindus have no misgivings about death penalty; their position is that evil-doers who deserve death should be killed, and that a king in particular is obliged to punish criminals and should not hesitate to kill them, even if they happen to be his own brothers and sons.

Other scholars conclude that the scriptures of Hinduism suggest sentences for any crime must be fair, proportional and not cruel.

===== Non-human life =====
The Hindu precept of 'cause no injury' applies to animals and all life forms. This precept isn't found in the oldest verses of Vedas, but increasingly becomes one of the central ideas between 500 BC and 400 AD. In the oldest texts, numerous ritual sacrifices of animals, including cows and horses, are highlighted and hardly any mention is made of Ahimsa to non-human life.

Hindu scriptures, dated to between 5th century and 1st century BC, while discussing human diet, initially suggest kosher meat may be eaten, evolving it with the suggestion that only meat obtained through ritual sacrifice can be eaten, then that one should eat no meat because it hurts animals, with verses describing the noble life as one that lives on flowers, roots and fruits alone.

Later texts of Hinduism declare Ahimsa one of the primary virtues, declare any killing or harming any life as against dharma (moral life). Finally, the discussion in Upanishads and Hindu Epics shifts to whether a human being can ever live his or her life without harming animal and plant life in some way; which and when plants or animal meat may be eaten, whether violence against animals causes human beings to become less compassionate, and if and how one may exert least harm to non-human life consistent with ahimsa precept, given the constraints of life and human needs. The Mahabharata permits hunting by warriors, but opposes it in the case of hermits who must be strictly nonviolent. Sushruta Samhita, a Hindu text written in the 3rd or 4th century, in Chapter XLVI suggests proper diet as a means of treating certain illnesses, and recommends various fishes and meats for different ailments and for pregnant women, and the Charaka Samhita describes meat as superior to all other kinds of food for convalescents.

Across the texts of Hinduism, there is a profusion of ideas about the virtue of Ahimsa when applied to non-human life, but without a universal consensus. Alsdorf claims the debate and disagreements between supporters of vegetarian lifestyle and meat eaters was significant. Even suggested exceptions – ritual slaughter and hunting – were challenged by advocates of Ahimsa. In the Mahabharata both sides present various arguments to substantiate their viewpoints. Moreover, a hunter defends his profession in a long discourse.

Many of the arguments proposed in favor of non-violence to animals refer to the bliss one feels, the rewards it entails before or after death, the danger and harm it prevents, as well as to the karmic consequences of violence.

The ancient Hindu texts discuss Ahimsa and non-animal life. They discourage wanton destruction of nature including of wild and cultivated plants. Hermits (sannyasins) were urged to live on a fruitarian diet so as to avoid the destruction of plants. Scholars claim the principles of ecological non-violence is innate in the Hindu tradition, and its conceptual fountain has been Ahimsa as their cardinal virtue.

The dharmic philosophy of ancient India exists in all Indian languages and culture. For example, the Tirukkuṛaḷ, written between 200 BCE and 500 CE, and sometimes called the Tamil Veda, is one of the most cherished classics written in a South Indian language. The Tirukkuṛaḷ dedicates Chapters 26, 32 and 33 of Book 1 to the virtue of ahimsa, namely, moral vegetarianism, non-harming, and non-killing, respectively. The Tirukkuṛaḷ says that ahimsa applies to all life forms.

==== Jainism ====
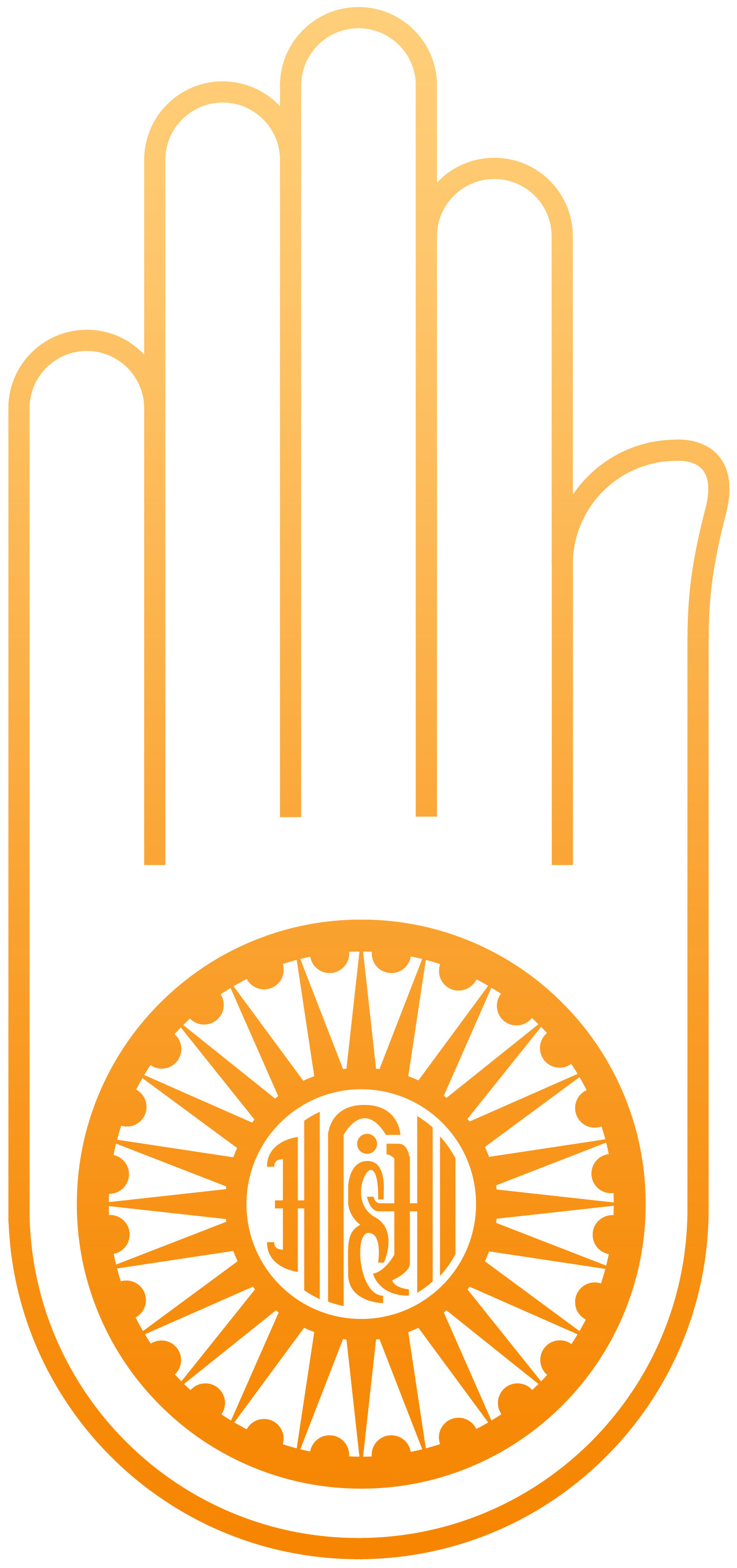
The hand with a wheel on the palm symbolizes the Jain Vow of Ahimsa. The word in the middle is "Ahimsa". The wheel represents the dharmacakra which stands for the resolve to halt the cycle of reincarnation through relentless pursuit of truth and non-violence.

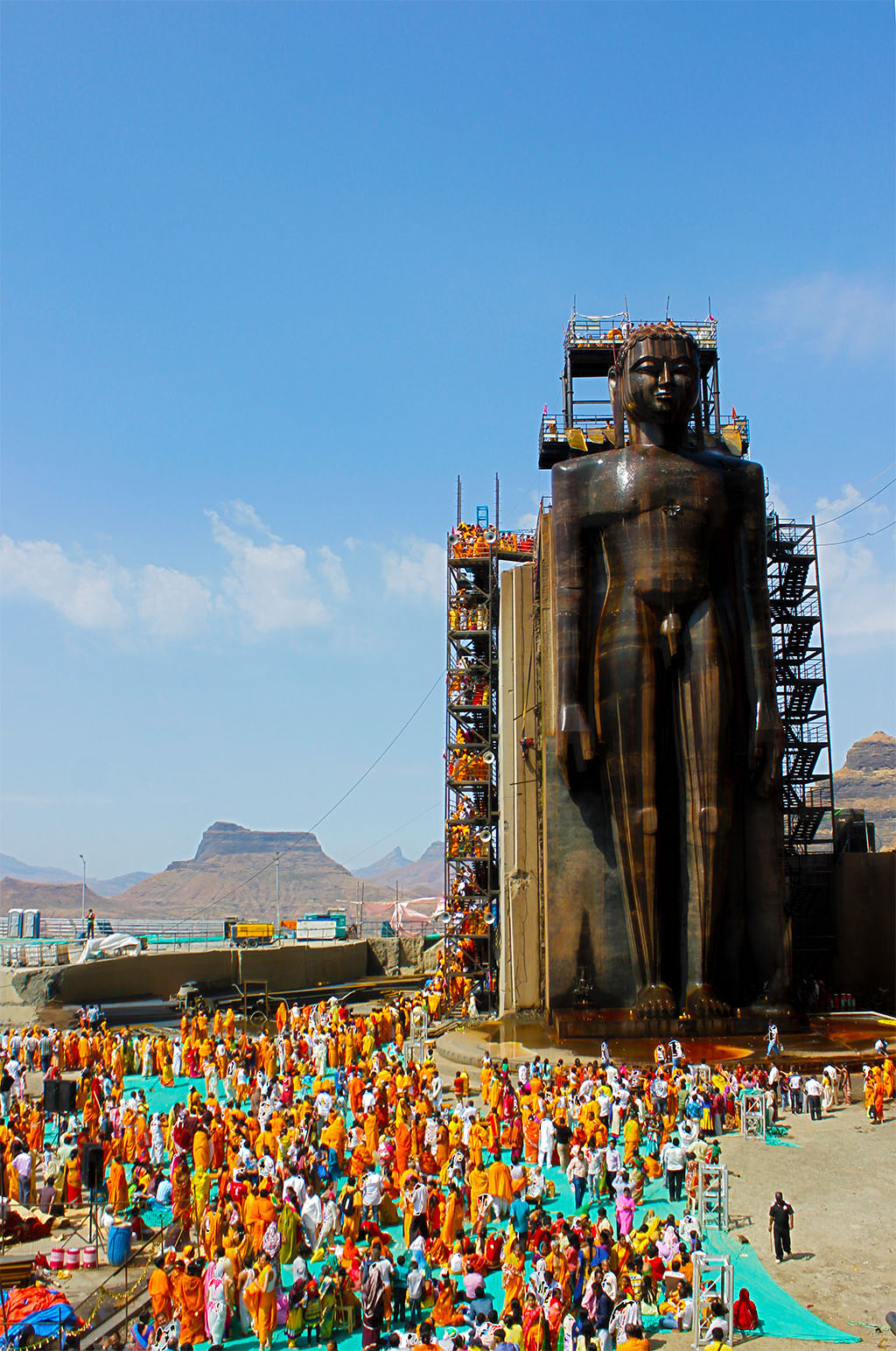
The Statue of Ahimsa - of first Tirthankar, Rishabhdeva

In Jainism, the understanding and implementation of Ahimsā is more radical, scrupulous, and comprehensive than in any other religion. Killing any living being out of passions is considered hiṃsā (to injure) and abstaining from such an act is ahimsā (noninjury). The vow of ahimsā is considered the foremost among the 'five vows of Jainism'. Other vows like truth (Satya) are meant for safeguarding the vow of ahimsā. In the practice of Ahimsa, the requirements are less strict for the lay persons (sravakas) who have undertaken anuvrata (Smaller Vows) than for the Jain monastics who are bound by the Mahavrata "Great Vows". The statement ahimsā paramo dharmaḥ is often found inscribed on the walls of the Jain temples. Like in Hinduism, the aim is to prevent the accumulation of harmful karma. When lord Mahaviraswami revived and reorganized the Jain faith in the 6th or 5th century BCE, Rishabhanatha (Ādinātha), the first Jain Tirthankara, whom modern Western historians consider to be a historical figure, followed by Parshvanatha (Pārśvanātha) the twenty-third Tirthankara lived in about the 8th century BCE. He founded the community to which Mahavira's parents belonged. Ahimsa was already part of the "Fourfold Restraint" (Caujjama), the vows taken by Parshva's followers. In the times of Mahavira and in the following centuries, Jains were at odds with both Buddhists and followers of the Vedic religion or Hindus, whom they accused of negligence and inconsistency in the implementation of Ahimsa. According to the Jain tradition either lacto vegetarianism or veganism is mandatory.

The Jain concept of Ahimsa is characterised by several aspects. It does not make any exception for ritual sacrificers and professional warrior-hunters. Killing of animals for food is absolutely ruled out. Jains also make considerable efforts not to injure plants in everyday life as far as possible. Though they admit that plants must be destroyed for the sake of food, they accept such violence only inasmuch as it is indispensable for human survival, and there are special instructions for preventing unnecessary violence against plants. Jains go out of their way so as not to hurt even small insects and other minuscule animals. For example, Jains often do not go out at night, when they are more likely to step upon an insect. In their view, injury caused by carelessness is like injury caused by deliberate action. Eating honey is strictly outlawed, as it would amount to violence against the bees. Some Jains abstain from farming because it inevitably entails unintentional killing or injuring of many small animals, such as worms and insects, but agriculture is not forbidden in general and there are Jain farmers.

Theoretically, all life forms are said to deserve full protection from all kinds of injury, but Jains recognise a hierarchy of life. Mobile beings are given higher protection than immobile ones. For the mobile beings, they distinguish between one-sensed, two-sensed, three-sensed, four-sensed and five-sensed ones; a one-sensed animal has touch as its only sensory modality. The more senses a being has, the more they care about non-injuring it. Among the five-sensed beings, the precept of non-injury and non-violence to the rational ones (humans) is strongest in Jain Ahimsa.

Jains agree with Hindus that violence in self-defence can be justified, and they agree that a soldier who kills enemies in combat is performing a legitimate duty. Jain communities accepted the use of military power for their defence, there were Jain monarchs, military commanders, and soldiers.

==== Buddhism ====
In Buddhist texts Ahimsa (or its Pāli cognate avihiṃsā) is part of the Five Precepts (Pañcasīla), the first of which has been to abstain from killing. This precept of Ahimsa is applicable to both the Buddhist layperson and the monk community.

The Ahimsa precept is not a commandment and transgressions did not invite religious sanctions for layperson, but their power has been in the Buddhist belief in karmic consequences and their impact in afterlife during rebirth. Killing, in Buddhist belief, could lead to rebirth in the hellish realm, and for a longer time in more severe conditions if the murder victim was a monk. Saving animals from slaughter for meat, is believed to be a way to acquire merit for better rebirth. These moral precepts have been voluntarily self-enforced in lay Buddhist culture through the associated belief in karma and rebirth. The Buddhist texts not only recommended Ahimsa, but suggest avoiding trading goods that contribute to or are a result of violence:

These five trades, O monks, should not be taken up by a lay follower: trading with weapons, trading in living beings, trading in meat, trading in intoxicants, trading in poison.

— Anguttara Nikaya V.177, Translated by Martine Batchelor

Unlike lay Buddhists, transgressions by monks do invite sanctions. Full expulsion of a monk from sangha follows instances of killing, just like any other serious offense against the monastic nikaya code of conduct.

===== War =====
Violent ways of punishing criminals and prisoners of war was not explicitly condemned in Buddhism, but peaceful ways of conflict resolution and punishment with the least amount of injury were encouraged. The early texts condemn the mental states that lead to violent behavior.

Nonviolence is an overriding theme within the Pali Canon. While the early texts condemn killing in the strongest terms, and portray the ideal king as a pacifist, such a king is nonetheless flanked by an army. It seems that the Buddha's teaching on nonviolence was not interpreted or put into practice in an uncompromisingly pacifist or anti-military-service way by early Buddhists. The early texts assume war to be a fact of life, and well-skilled warriors are viewed as necessary for defensive warfare. In Pali texts, injunctions to abstain from violence and involvement with military affairs are directed at members of the sangha; later Mahayana texts, which often generalise monastic norms to laity, require this of lay people as well.

The early texts do not contain just-war ideology as such. Some argue that a sutta in the Gamani Samyuttam rules out all military service. In this passage, a soldier asks the Buddha if it is true that, as he has been told, soldiers slain in battle are reborn in a heavenly realm. The Buddha reluctantly replies that if he is killed in battle while his mind is seized with the intention to kill, he will undergo an unpleasant rebirth. In the early texts, a person's mental state at the time of death is generally viewed as having a great impact on the next birth.

Some Buddhists point to other early texts as justifying defensive war. One example is the Kosala Samyutta, in which King Pasenadi of Kosala, a righteous king favored by the Buddha, learns of an impending attack on his kingdom. He arms himself in defence, and leads his army into battle to protect his kingdom from attack. He lost this battle but won the war. King Pasenadi eventually defeated Emperor Ajatashatru of Magadha and captured him alive. He thought that, although this Emperor of Magadha has transgressed against his kingdom, he had not transgressed against him personally, and Ajatashatru was still his nephew. He released Ajatashatru and did not harm him. Upon his return, the Buddha said (among other things) that Pasenadi "is a friend of virtue, acquainted with virtue, intimate with virtue", while the opposite is said of the aggressor, Emperor Ajatashatru.

According to Theravada commentaries, there are five requisite factors that must all be fulfilled for an act to be both an act of killing and to be karmically negative. These are: (1) the presence of a living being, human or animal; (2) the knowledge that the being is a living being; (3) the intent to kill; (4) the act of killing by some means; and (5) the resulting death. Some Buddhists have argued on this basis that the act of killing is complicated, and its ethicization is predicated upon intent. Some have argued that in defensive postures, for example, the primary intention of a soldier is not to kill, but to defend against aggression, and the act of killing in that situation would have minimal negative karmic repercussions.

According to Dr. Babasaheb Ambedkar, there is circumstantial evidence encouraging Ahimsa, from the Buddha's doctrine, "Love all, so that you may not wish to kill any." Gautama Buddha distinguished between a principle and a rule. He did not make Ahimsa a matter of rule, but suggested it as a matter of principle. This gives Buddhists freedom to act.

===== Laws =====
The emperors of Sui dynasty, Tang dynasty and early Song dynasty banned killing in Lunar calendar 1st, 5th, and 9th month. Empress Wu Tse-Tien banned killing for more than half a year in 692. Some also banned fishing for some time each year.

There were bans after death of emperors, Buddhist and Taoist prayers, and natural disasters such as after a drought in 1926 summer Shanghai and an 8 days ban from August 12, 1959, after the August 7 flood (八七水災), the last big flood before the 88 Taiwan Flood.

People avoid killing during some festivals, like the Taoist Ghost Festival, the Nine Emperor Gods Festival, the Vegetarian Festival and many others.

== Methods ==
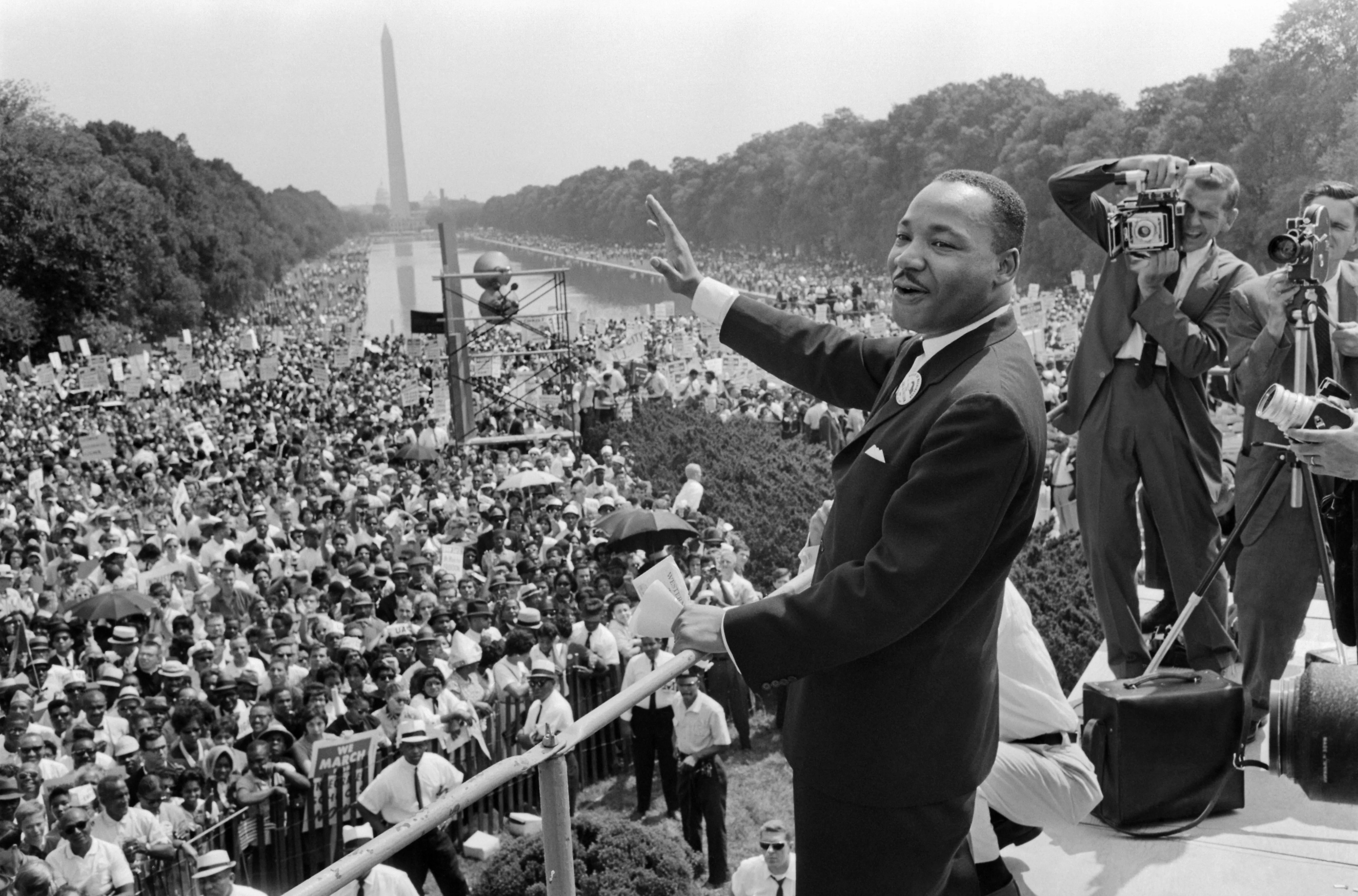
Martin Luther King Jr. speaking at the 1963 March on Washington

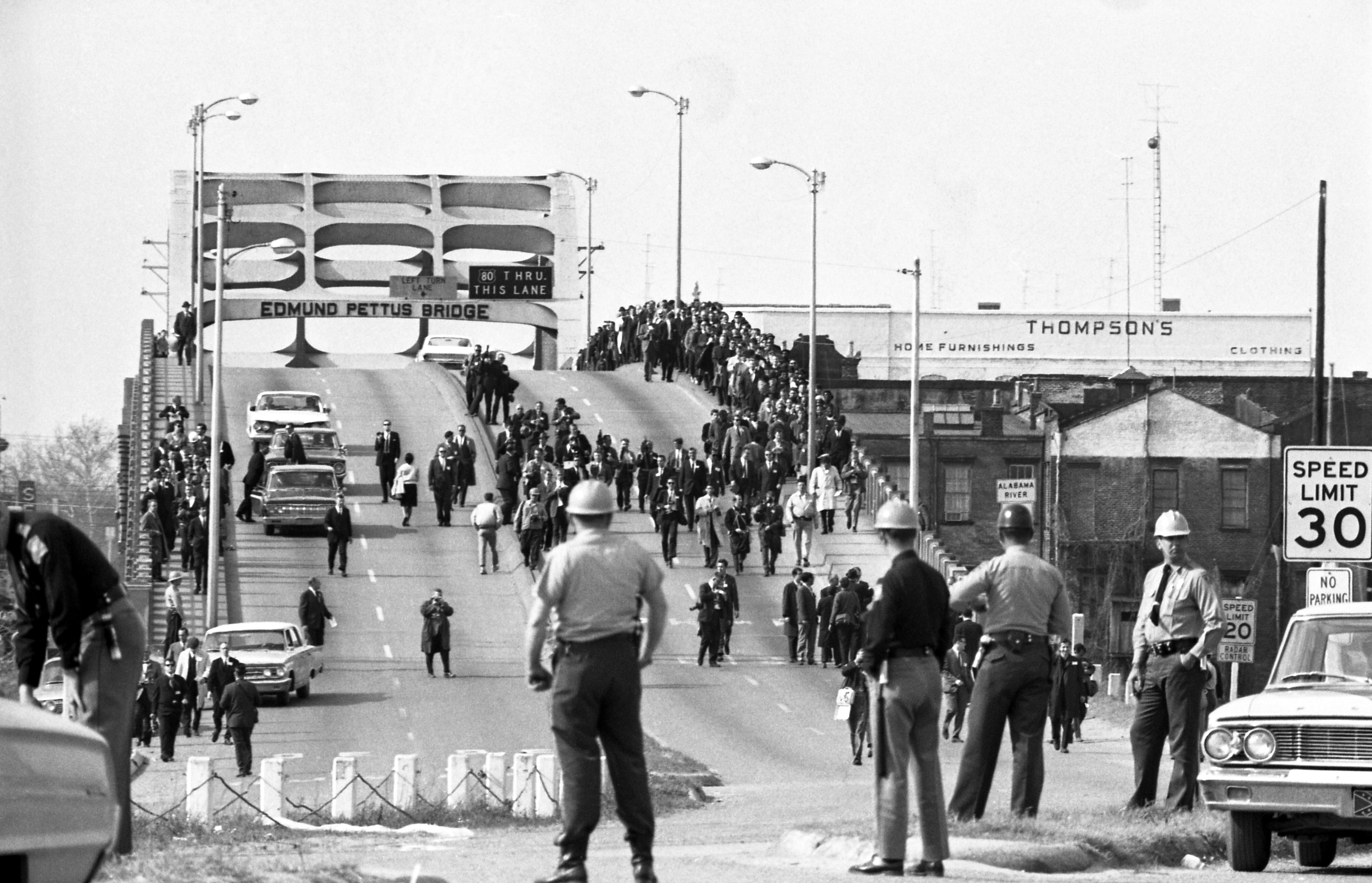
Even when the bridge was closed the demonstrators on the initial 1965 Selma to Montgomery march stayed on the sidewalk in compliance with nonviolent tactics and strategies.

Nonviolent action generally comprises three categories: Acts of Protest and Persuasion, Noncooperation, and Nonviolent Intervention.

=== Acts of protest ===
Nonviolent acts of protest and persuasion are symbolic actions performed by a group of people to show their support or disapproval of something. The goal of this kind of action is to bring public awareness to an issue, persuade or influence a particular group of people, or to facilitate future nonviolent action. The message can be directed toward the public, opponents, or people affected by the issue. Methods of protest and persuasion include speeches, public communications, petitions, symbolic acts, art, processions (marches), and other public assemblies.

=== Noncooperation ===
Noncooperation involves the purposeful withholding of cooperation or the unwillingness to initiate in cooperation with an opponent. The goal of noncooperation is to halt or hinder an industry, political system, or economic process. Methods of noncooperation include labour strikes, economic boycotts, civil disobedience, sex strike, tax refusal, and general disobedience.

=== Nonviolent intervention ===
Compared with protest and noncooperation, nonviolent intervention is a more direct method of nonviolent action. Nonviolent intervention can be used defensively—for example to maintain an institution or independent initiative—or offensively- for example, to drastically forward a nonviolent cause into the "territory" of those who oppose it. Intervention is often more immediate and initially effective than the other two methods, but is also harder to maintain and more taxing to the participants involved.

Gene Sharp, a political scientist who sought to advance the worldwide study and use of strategic nonviolent action in conflict, wrote extensively about the methods of nonviolent action. In his 1973 book Waging Nonviolent Struggle he described 198 methods of nonviolent action, and in it places several examples of constructive program in this category. In early Greece, Aristophanes' Lysistrata gives the fictional example of women withholding sexual favors from their husbands until war was abandoned (a sex strike). A modern work of fiction inspired by Gene Sharp and by Aristophanes is the 1986 novel A Door into Ocean by Joan Slonczewski, depicting an ocean world inhabited by women who use nonviolent means to repel armed space invaders. Other methods of nonviolent intervention include occupations (sit-ins), fasting (hunger strikes), truck cavalcades, and dual sovereignty/parallel government.

Tactics must be carefully chosen, taking into account political and cultural circumstances, and form part of a larger plan or strategy.

Successful nonviolent cross-border intervention projects include the Guatemala Accompaniment Project, Peace Brigades International and Christian Peacemaker Teams. Developed in the early 1980s, and originally inspired by the Gandhian Shanti Sena, the primary tools of these organisations have been nonviolent protective accompaniment, backed up by a global support network which can respond to threats, local and regional grassroots diplomatic and peacebuilding efforts, human rights observation and witnessing, and reporting. In extreme cases, most of these groups are also prepared to do interpositioning: placing themselves between parties who are engaged or threatening to engage in outright attacks in one or both directions. Individual and large group cases of interpositioning, when called for, have been remarkably effective in dampening conflict and saving lives.

Another powerful tactic of nonviolent intervention invokes public scrutiny of the perceived oppressors as a result of the resisters remaining nonviolent in the face of violent repression. If the military or police attempt to repress nonviolent resisters violently, the power to act shifts from the hands of the oppressors to those of the resisters. If the resisters are persistent, the military or police will be forced to accept the fact that they no longer have any power over the resisters. Often, the willingness of the resisters to suffer has a profound effect on the mind and emotions of the oppressor, leaving them unable to commit such a violent act again.

== Revolution ==
Some have argued that a relatively nonviolent revolution would require fraternisation with military forces.

== Criticism ==
Ernesto Che Guevara, Leon Trotsky, Frantz Fanon and others have argued that violence is a necessary accompaniment to revolutionary change or that the right to self-defense is fundamental. Subhas Chandra Bose supported Gandhi and nonviolence early in his career but became disillusioned with it and became an effective advocate of violence.

In the 1949 essay "Reflections on Gandhi", George Orwell argued that the nonviolent resistance strategy of Gandhi could be effective in countries with "a free press and the right of assembly", which could make it possible "not merely to appeal to outside opinion, but to bring a mass movement into being, or even to make your intentions known to your adversary"; but he was skeptical of Gandhi's approach being effective in the opposite sort of circumstances.

Reinhold Niebuhr similarly affirmed Gandhi's approach while criticising aspects of it. He argued, "The advantage of non-violence as a method of expressing moral goodwill lies in the fact that it protects the agent against the resentments which violent conflict always creates in both parties to a conflict, and it proves this freedom of resentment and ill-will to the contending party in the dispute by enduring more suffering than it causes." However, Niebuhr also held, "The differences between violent and nonviolent methods of coercion and resistance are not so absolute that it would be possible to regard violence as a morally impossible instrument of social change."

In the midst of repression of radical African American groups in the United States during the 1960s, Black Panther member George Jackson said of the nonviolent tactics of Martin Luther King Jr.:

The concept of nonviolence is a false ideal. It presupposes the existence of compassion and a sense of justice on the part of one's adversary. When this adversary has everything to lose and nothing to gain by exercising justice and compassion, his reaction can only be negative.

Malcolm X also clashed with civil rights leaders over the issue of nonviolence, arguing that violence should not be ruled out if no option remained. He noted that: "I believe it's a crime for anyone being brutalized to continue to accept that brutality without doing something to defend himself."

In his book How Nonviolence Protects the State, anarchist Peter Gelderloos criticises nonviolence as being ineffective, racist, statist, patriarchal, tactically and strategically inferior to militant activism, and deluded. Gelderloos claims that traditional histories whitewash the impact of nonviolence, ignoring the involvement of militants in such movements as the Indian independence movement and the Civil Rights Movement and falsely showing Gandhi and King as being their respective movement's most successful activists. He further argues that nonviolence is generally advocated by privileged white people who expect "oppressed people, many of whom are people of color, to suffer patiently under an inconceivably greater violence, until such time as the Great White Father is swayed by the movement's demands or the pacifists achieve that legendary 'critical mass.'" On the other hand, anarchism also includes a section committed to nonviolence called anarcho-pacifism. The main early influences were the thought of Henry David Thoreau and Leo Tolstoy while later the ideas of Mahatma Gandhi gained importance. It developed "mostly in Holland, Britain, and the United States, before and during the Second World War".

The efficacy of nonviolence was also challenged by some anti-capitalist protesters advocating a "diversity of tactics" during street demonstrations across Europe and the US following the anti-World Trade Organization protests in Seattle, Washington in 1999.

Nonviolence advocates see some truth in this argument: Gandhi himself said often that he could teach nonviolence to a violent person but not to a coward and that true nonviolence came from renouncing violence, not by not having any to renounce. This is the meaning of his quote "It is better to be violent, if there is violence in our hearts, than to put on the cloak of nonviolence to cover impotence."

Advocates responding to criticisms of the efficacy of nonviolence point to the limited success of nonviolent struggles even against the Nazi regimes in Denmark and even in Berlin. A study by Erica Chenoweth and Maria Stephan found that nonviolent revolutions are twice as effective as violent ones and lead to much greater degrees of democratic freedom.

== Research ==
A 2016 study finds that "increasing levels of globalization are positively associated with the emergence of nonviolent campaigns, while negatively influencing the probability of violent campaigns. Integration into the world increases the popularity of peaceful alternatives to achieve political goals." A 2020 study found that nonviolent campaigns were more likely to succeed when there was not an ethnic division between actors in the campaign and in the government. According to a 2020 study in the American Political Science Review, nonviolent civil rights protests boosted vote shares for the Democratic party in presidential elections in nearby counties, but violent protests substantially boosted white support for Republicans in counties near to the violent protests.

== Notable nonviolence theorists and practitioners ==
- Jesus of Nazareth (4 BCE-33 CE) - A religious figure that advocated for nonviolence, and to love your enemies on his Sermon on the Mount.
- 14th Dalai Lama (b. 1935) – spiritual leader and head of Tibet
- Issa Amro (b. 1980) – Palestinian activist
- Ghassan Andoni (b. 1956) – professor of physics at Bir Zeit University, and a Palestinian Christian leader who advocates nonviolent resistance in the Israeli-Palestinian conflict
- Corazon Aquino (1933–2009) – Filipino politician who served as the 11th president of the Philippines from 1986 to 1992. She was the most prominent figure of the 1986 People Power Revolution, which ended the two-decade rule of President Ferdinand Marcos and led to the establishment of the current democratic Fifth Philippine Republic
- A. T. Ariyaratne (1931–2024) – Sri Lankan founder and president of the Sarvodaya Shramadana Movement in Sri Lanka
- Julia Bacha (b. 1980) – Brazilian documentary filmmaker
- Sunderlal Bahuguna (1927–2021) – Indian environmentalist and Chipko movement leader
- Lady Frances Balfour (1858–1931) – British aristocrat, author, and suffragist
- Omar Barghouti (b. 1964) – founding committee member of the Palestinian Campaign for the Academic and Cultural Boycott of Israel (PACBI) and a co-founder of the Boycott, Divestment and Sanctions (BDS) movement
- Antonio Bello (1935–1993) – Italian Catholic prelate who served as the Bishop of Molfetta-Ruvo-Giovinazzo-Terlizzi from 1982 until his death from cancer in 1993
- Peter Benenson (1921–2005) – British barrister and human rights activist and the founder of the human rights group Amnesty International (AI)
- James Bevel (1936–2008) – strategist and director of most of the major events of the 1960s civil rights movement, tactician of nonviolence
- Rubina Feroze Bhatti (b. 1969) – Pakistani human rights activist, peace activist and leadership consultant
- Étienne de La Boétie (1530–1563) – French magistrate, classicist, writer, poet and political theorist
- Grace Lee Boggs (1915–2015) – philosopher, feminist, founder of Detroit Summer
- Iyad Burnat (b. 1973) – Palestinian activist who leads Bil'in's nonviolent struggle in the West Bank
- Aldo Capitini (1899–1968) – Italian philosopher, poet, political activist, anti-fascist, and educator
- April Carter (1937–2022) – British peace activist
- Howard Clark (1950–2013) – active pacifist who was Chair of War Resisters' International (WRI) from 2006 until his sudden death from a heart attack
- Kevin P. Clements (b.1946) - Emeritus Professor of Peace and Conflict Studies at the University of Otago in New Zealand and the recipient of the Luxembourg Peace Prize (2022)
- Dorothy Day (1897–1980) – Journalist and co-founder of the Catholic Worker movement
- Barbara Deming (1917–1984) – feminist, author, war-tax resister
- Mariateresa Di Lascia (1954–1994) – Italian politician and writer, activist, human rights' supporter
- Muriel Duckworth (1908–2009) – Canadian pacifist, feminist, and social and community activist
- David Eberhardt (b. 1941) – American peace activist and poet
- Daniel Ellsberg (1931–2023) – Whistleblower who released the Pentagon Papers
- Adolfo Pérez Esquivel (b. 1931) – Argentine activist, community organizer, painter, writer and sculptor
- Ruth Fry (1878–1962) – British Quaker writer, pacifist and peace activist
- Nichidatsu Fujii (1885–1985) – Japanese Buddhist monk, and founder of the Nipponzan-Myōhōji order of Buddhism
- Mohandas Gandhi (1869–1948) – strategist and organizer in South African and India
- Samira Gutoc (b. 1974) – Filipina civic leader, journalist, environmentalist, women's rights advocate and politician
- Abdul Ghaffar Khan (1890–1998) - Pashtun Indian freedom fighter, colleague of Mahatma Gandhi, leader of the Khudai Khidmatgar uniformed nonviolent army
- Valarie Kaur (b. 1981) – American activist, documentary filmmaker, lawyer, educator, and faith leader
- Chân Không (b. 1938) – expatriate Vietnamese Buddhist Bhikkhunī (nun) and peace activist
- Robert L. Holmes (b. 1935) - American Professor emeritus, international lecturer and theorist of nonviolence, war and morality at the University of Rochester
- Bernard Lafayette (b. 1940) – Civil rights organizer, Kingian nonviolence educator
- James Lawson (b. 1928) – Civil rights organizer, tactician of nonviolence
- Martin Luther King Jr. (1929–1968) – Civil rights organizer and tactician of nonviolence
- Gopi Shankar Madurai (b. 1991) Indian equal rights and Indigenous rights activist
- Seiji Ozawa (1935–2024) Japanese Music Director whose Concerts for Peace were held at the United Nations and Hiroshima
- Aziz Abu Sarah (b. 1980) – Palestinian peace activist, journalist, social entrepreneur and politician
- Irom Chanu Sharmila (b. 1972) – Indian civil rights activist, political activist, and poet
- Gene Sharp (1928–2018) – leading scholar of nonviolence
- Percy Bysshe Shelley (1792–1822) – British writer who is considered one of the major English Romantic poets
- Oscar Soria (b. 1974) – Argentinian political activist, social journalist, and environmental and human rights campaigner, currently serving as a campaign director in the international activist group Avaaz
- Thích Nhật Từ (b. 1969) – Vietnamese Buddhist reformer, an author, a poet, a psychological consultant, and an active social activist in Vietnam
- Malala Yousafzai (b. 1997) – Pakistani female education activist and the 2014 Nobel Peace Prize laureate

== See also ==
- Ahimsa
- Anti-war
- Christian anarchism
- Christian pacifism
- Conflict resolution
- Consistent life ethic
- Chivalry
- Department of Peace
- Draft evasion, see Draft resistance
- Green party
- Green politics
- List of peace activists
- "Mahavira: The Hero of Nonviolence"
- Non-aggression principle
- Nonkilling
- Nonresistance
- Nonviolence International
- Nonviolent Communication
- Nonviolent Peaceforce
- Nonviolent resistance
- Nonviolent self defense
- Nonviolent video game
- Pacifism
- Padayatra
- Passive resistance
- Peace
- Peace movement
- Satyagraha
- Season for Nonviolence
- Social defence
- Third Party Non-violent Intervention
- Turning the other cheek
- Violence begets violence
- War resister
