= Putinversteher =

German neologism for Putin empathizers

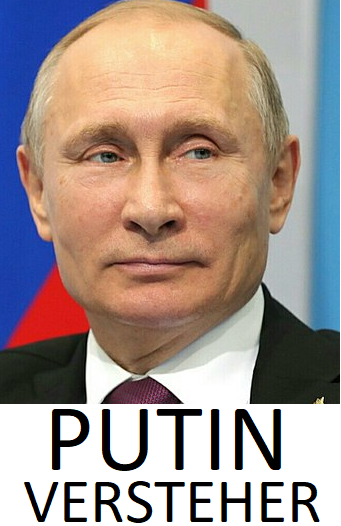
A Putinversteher logo similar to what may be seen on T-shirts, mugs, and the like

Putinversteher or Putin-Versteher (pronounced [ˈpuːtiːnfɛɐ̯ˌʃteːɐ], female form Putinversteherin) is a German neologism (Putin + verstehen), which literally translates to "Putin understander", i.e. "one who understands Putin". It is a pejorative reference to politicians and pundits who express empathy to Vladimir Putin and may also be translated as "Putin-Empathizer". Similar words include Russlandversteher and Russland-Versteher ("Russia-Empathizer").

== Origin ==
The term was first used in March 2014 by the German publications Der Spiegel and Die Welt, shortly after the annexation of Crimea by the Russian Federation. Der Spiegel used the term when Die Linke politician Sahra Wagenknecht and other party members said that the annexation of Crimea was understandable and justified, arguing that Russia's "legitimate interests in the region" must be taken into consideration. That same month, Die Welt labelled some other people that, who, they view as going too far in their "understanding" of Putin. Foremost was former Social Democratic of Germany (SPD) leader and German chancellor Gerhard Schröder, whose supporters were also irritated by his closeness to Putin.

After the 2014 annexation, many Putinverstehers "backtracked or at least stopped stating their support publicly". After the start of the Russian invasion of Ukraine, they "came under increasing pressure to publicly distance themselves from Vladimir Putin amid accusations that they were bringing shame on the country and themselves." The Bucha massacre in April 2022 reportedly "made that for most people the arguments typically used by Putinversteher had definitely lost their credibility". By April 2022, the term had gained a different moral connotation than in March 2014. For many, "Bucha had reduced the invasion to a Manichean conflict between good and evil."

Putin-Versteher was among frequent suggestions for the Un-word of the year 2014; the panel of linguists favoured Lügenpresse ("lying press"). Among the runners-up was a similar term, Russland-Versteher ("Russia-Understander"). Although the word was used in English media as early as 2014, it became an international term after the 2022 Russian invasion.

== Scope and usage ==
=== Characterization ===
A major cornerstone of "Putin-friendly" attitudes is the "legitimate interests of Russia" in the post-Soviet states, while another typical trait is anti-Americanism. Putinversteher are typically politically heterogeneous and include figures across the political spectrum. Namely, businesspeople with business interests in Russia. Paul Roderick Gregory wrote that they "serve as Putin's first line of defence against meaningful European sanctions for the Anschluss of Crimea".

Academic Taras Kuzio has criticized scholars of Russia, whom he defines as Putinversteher, in particular, their response to the Russo-Ukrainian War. In his definition, he calls these scholars "those who seek to always deflect criticism from Russian President Putin and Russia and lay blame on Ukraine, NATO, the EU, and the US."

=== In Germany ===
The foremost figure described as Putinversteher is Gerhard Schröder; however, by March 2014, many others were mentioned. One of these was president Thomas Bach of the International Olympic Committee. The feminist journalist Alice Schwarzer said that 96.77% of the inhabitants of Crimea wanted to belong to Russia. Peter Gauweiler of the Christian Social Union in Bavaria spoke in favour of cooperation with Russia on 5 March 2014. The former European Commissioner Günter Verheugen of the SPD called Svoboda members of the Ukrainian government "richtige Faschisten" (true fascists). Alexander Gauland of Alternative for Germany (AfD) had previously stated that Russia would never condone the loss of "Holy Kiev, birthplace of Russia". The Sahra Wagenknecht Alliance has defended the annexation of Crimea by pointing to the anti-Russian sentiment in Kyiv and repeating other Russian propaganda. Armin Laschet of the Christian Democratic Union of Germany (CDU) spoke of Anti-Putin-Populismus (anti-Putin populism) in Germany. Gernot Erler of the SPD had called for "an end to Russia Bashing".

Katrin Göring-Eckardt of the Alliance 90/The Greens accused Wagenknecht and The Left party of being Putinversteher and against all foreign intervention, except when Russia did it. Paul Roderick Gregory described Schröder (SPD) as "the most egregious Putinversteher". Gregory wrote that Schröder might be susceptible to Putin's pressure because he chaired the board of Nord Stream 1 with an official one million dollar honorarium. Gregory mentioned that Schröder called to respect Russian "sensitivities" and compared the separatism of Crimea with that of Kosovo. The term was applied to former German chancellor Helmut Schmidt of the SPD by The Economist, Forbes, and in Schmidt's biography book. Schmidt argued that Putin's annexation of Crimea, while illegitimate, was "understandable". In an interview, he said: "If you placed yourself in Putin's shoes, you would likely react in the case of Crimea as he did."

By 2022, the numbers of the Putinversteher had dwindled. In February 2022, Friederike Haupt, a political observer from Frankfurter Allgemeine Zeitung, wrote that Putinversteher could be found primarily in the far-right AfD and The Left parties, as well as in parts of the SPD. An example of a journalist who has continued to be labelled a Putinversteher is Gabriele Krone-Schmalz. Due to his Russia policy and attitude towards NATO. Rolf Mützenich, the leader of the Social Democratic Party in the Bundestag, has been repeatedly referred to as a Putinversteher, which he has always denied.

In November 2023, the journalist and Putin-biographer Hubert Seipel, known for his unique, personal access to Vladimir Putin, was labelled a Putinversteher after it was revealed that he had received €600,000 from Russia to write a book titled Putin’s Power: Why Europe Needs Russia via sanctioned oligarch Alexei Mordashov.

=== In France ===
Marine Le Pen and the far-right National Rally were considered Putinversteher in France. In May 2014, she praised Putin as a patriot and defender of the Christian heritage of European civilization. In September 2014, her party received a loan of 9 million euros from the First Czech Russian Bank based in Moscow. While not illegal, it cast doubt on her objectivity towards Putin. In January 2017, she condoned the Russian annexation of Crimea. On 24 March 2017, Putin officially received Le Pen in the Kremlin. After the Russian invasion of Ukraine in 2022, Le Pen's party hastily removed a picture of the 2017 visit to Putin from its communication material, with Le Pen denying being a friend of Putin. In April 2022, party members of the European Parliament broke their tradition of opposing resolutions against Russia by being absent.

On the left, Jean-Luc Mélenchon, leader of La France Insoumise (LFI), was described by some as fitting the traditional profile of a Putinversteher for some of his positions on the Russo-Ukrainian war. In March 2014, he legitimized the invasion of Crimea as "a security measure against an adventurous Putschist regime in which neo-Nazis have a despicable influence". By October 2022, LFI had changed its position and spoke of a Russian war of aggression. In November 2022, LFI members of the European Parliament abstained from declaring Russia a state sponsor of terrorism.

=== In the Netherlands ===
After the 2022 invasion of Ukraine, the number of Putinversteher in the Netherlands quickly diminished. As of October 2022, the Forum for Democracy (FvD) was the only Dutch party still enthusiastic about Putin. As a result, the Labour Party and GroenLinks proposed to bar FvD from confidential meetings about military aid for Ukraine. Rob Bertholee, former head of the Dutch General Intelligence and Security Service, publicly supported this move.

On 19 December 2022, members of the Golfgroep petitioned the Dutch government to promote negotiations between Russia and Ukraine. The petition was signed by about two dozen university staff and some elderly ex-politicians. Critics argued that the wording of the petition suggested that both sides had an equal share in causing the war and that war crimes were not mentioned. A critic remarked about the petition that it "at least admitted that Russia had invaded Ukraine."

=== In Russia ===
The term was embraced in Russia, where a company named Putinversteher sells memorabilia (rings, clothes, and the like) with Putin imagery.

== See also ==
- Fellow traveller, or less charitably, useful idiot
- Mitläufer
- Vatnik
- Valdai Discussion Club
- Westsplaining
