= Mark W. Muesse =

American philosopher, theologian, and teacher

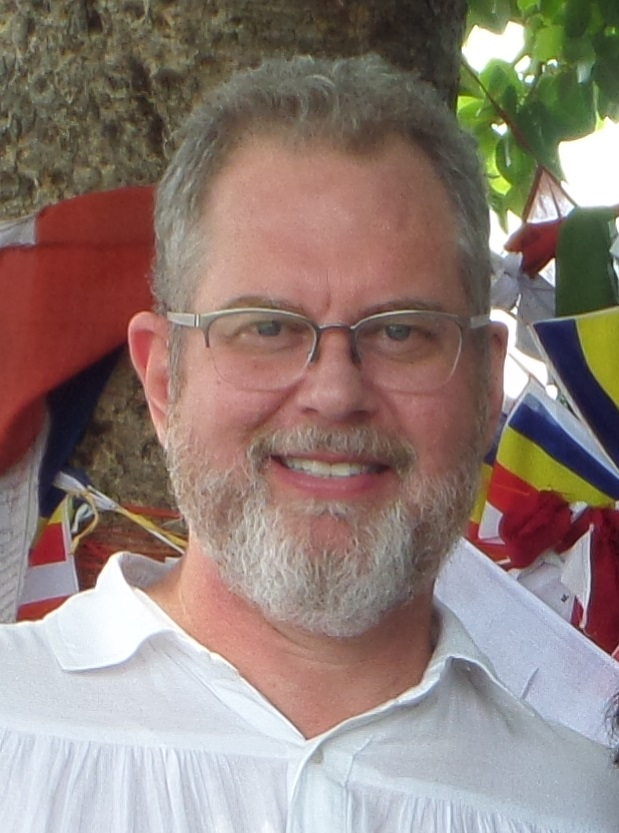
- Born: May 1, 1957 (age 69); Waco, Texas, USA
- Education: Baylor University Harvard University
- Occupations: American philosopher, theologian, and teacher

Mark William Muesse (born May 1, 1957) is an American philosopher, theologian, and teacher.

== Education ==
Muesse was born in Waco, Texas and attended University High School. He received a B.A. in English, summa cum laude, from the Honors College of Baylor University and was elected to Phi Beta Kappa. Muesse earned the M.T.S., A.M., and Ph.D. degrees from Harvard University. He has also pursued post-doctoral studies at the International Buddhist Meditation Centre, Wat Mahadhatu, Bangkok, Thailand; the Himalayan Yogic Institute, Kathmandu, Nepal; the Middle East Technical University in Ankara, Turkey; and the Subodhi Institute in Piliyandala, Sri Lanka.

== Career ==
Muesse taught at Rhodes College in Memphis, Tennessee from 1988 until 2018. He was also visiting professor of theology at the Tamil Nadu Theological Seminary in Madurai, India.

== Teaching and Service ==
Muesse has been widely recognized for his teaching and service. He received the Fortress Press Undergraduate Teaching Award (2007) and the Clarence Day Award for Outstanding Teaching (2008). He was a recipient of the “Distinguished Service Award” from the Viswayogi Viswamji Foundation for Universal Integration and Peace in Guntur, Andhra Pradesh, India, for “outstanding and dedicated community service and exceptional efforts to promote ‘human values and culture.’”

== Writings ==
Muesse has produced four lecture series and companion books for The Great Courses, including The Great Religions: Hinduism; Religions of the Axial Age; Confucius, Buddha, Jesus, and Muhammad; and Practicing Mindfulness: An Introduction to Meditation . His books include Redeeming Men: Religion and Masculinities (with Stephen Boyd and Merle Longwood); The Hindu Traditions: A Concise Introduction, which was awarded a Certificate of Special Distinction by the Uberoi Foundation for Religious Studies; The Age of the Sages: The Axial Age in Asia and the Near East.; and Four Wise Men: The Lives and Teachings of Confucius, Buddha, Jesus, and Muhammad.

== Philosophy ==
Muesse's philosophical perspective has been shaped by Paul Tillich, the later Martin Heidegger and Pierre Hadot. He also credits Theravada Buddhism, Stoicism, and American Pragmatism as decisive influences on his work. He is a specialist in apophaticism and mysticism in theology.

== Mindfulness Practice ==
Muesse is a longtime practitioner and teacher of Vipassana meditation. He has studied meditation at the International Buddhist Meditation Centre, Bangkok, Thailand; the Himalayan Yogic Institute, Kathmandu, Nepal; and the Subodhi Institute in Piliyandala, Sri Lanka. He is a partner in Advancing Mindfulness and leads retreats and seminars on mindfulness practices with Dr. Manoj K Jain.
