= Salvatore Babones =

American sociologist

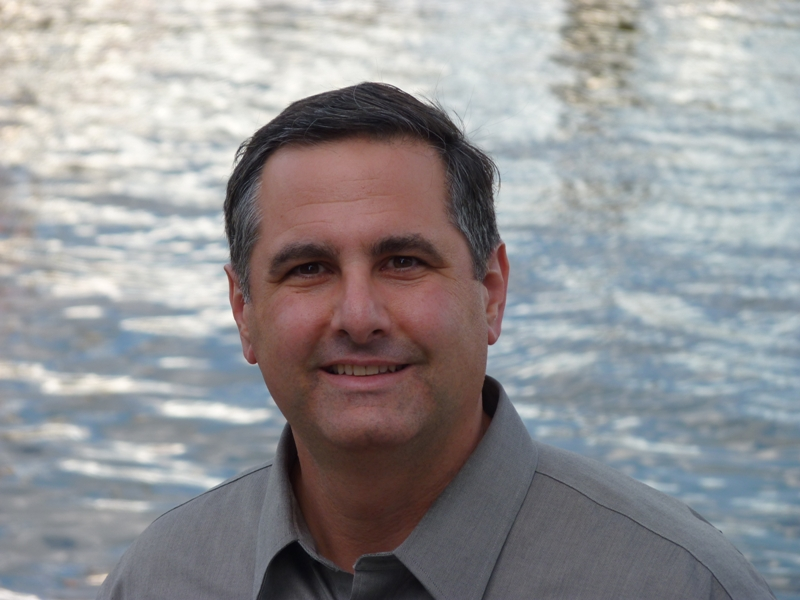
- Born: October 5, 1969 (age 57); New Jersey, United States
- Education: University of Montevallo (BS); Johns Hopkins University (MA, MSE, Ph.D.)
- Scientific career
- Fields: Sociology
- Workplaces: University of Sydney

Salvatore Babones (born October 5, 1969) is an American sociologist based at the University of Sydney.

== Biography ==
Babones received a B.S. in sociology from University of Montevallo in 1991, M.A. in sociology in 1997, M.S.E in Mathematical Sciences in 2002, and a Ph.D. in sociology in 2003 from Johns Hopkins University.

From 2003 to 2008 he was a professor of sociology at the University of Pittsburgh; and since 2008, at the University of Sydney. He has also been a visiting associate professor at Nanyang Technological University in Singapore (2015) and a visiting scholar at Academia Sinica in Taipei (2015).

He was a member of the Editorial Board for Journal of World-Systems Research.

== Work and views ==
Babones focuses on the "political sociology of democracy, economic development in post-socialist transition economies and quantitative methods for cross-national comparisons".

=== BRICS economies ===
Salvatore Babones and Hartmut Elsenhans in their book BRICS or Bust? Escaping the Middle-Income Trap compares the social, economic, and political trajectories of BRICS countries over the year. They argue that these countries are stuck in a middle-income trap, which was caused by the inequalities generated during their early development; this caused consumption to shift inefficiently towards luxury goods, preventing the continued growth in mass income. Babones concludes that BRICS counties can catch up with high-income countries only if their political leaders pursue growth strategies that benefit the entire population.

Political scientist BM Jain found the book to be a "must read" — it was a "distinctive contribution" to the understanding of BRICS economies.

=== American Tianxia ===
In his 2017 book, American Tianxia: Chinese money, American power, and the end of history, Babones questions the narrative of the 21st century being a Chinese Century. He argues that the Chinese concept of Tianxia is most suitable to describe the tremendous influence of the United States in International politics. The American Tianxia is a global club that elites worldwide want to join. The United States has the world's largest economy, a powerful military, and the world's reserve currency. According to him, this centrality of the United States in International affairs would prevent China from ever dominating it.

=== United States and Trump ===
In 2018, Babones published The New Authoritarianism: Trump, Populism, and the Tyranny of Experts on Donald Trump and his administration. Lacking in sources and notes, he did not intend it to be an academic monograph but rather a political screed. Babones welcomed Trump's populist approach to governance as a dissent against the usual "tyranny of unelected authoritarian experts" in liberal democracies. Rejecting allegations of authoritarianism, he found Trump's administration effective and credited Trump with strengthening democratic ideals by returning power to the electorate. On the overall, populism was a legitimate political position in liberal democracy.

Markus Heide of Uppsala University found Babones' "apologetic approach" to ignore the anti-democratic rhetoric of Trump and his supporters. Dan Glazebrook, reviewing for socialist newspaper The Morning Star, found the work to be an exercise in "Trumpian obfuscation". However, the book was favorably received in conservative media: Janet Albrechtsen, reviewing for The Australian, commended Babones for an "overdue ... corrective about populism"; it went on to feature in the 'Best [Books] on Politics 2018' by the Wall Street Journal.

Babones has since held the January 6 United States Capitol attack to be a "mostly peaceful protest"; he argued that Joe Biden was still a bigger threat to democracy on account of being supported by the press.

=== India ===
In September 2022, Babones criticized the democracy indices by Freedom House, V-Dem Institute, and Economist Intelligence Unit for their decision to downgrade India while under Narendra Modi's premiership and called for a retraction; noting their evidence to be flawed and "wildly disproportionate", he blamed the intellectuals who were surveyed for not being objective in their evaluations. Two months later, in a conclave arranged by India Today, speaking on the same locus, Babones accused the Indian intellectuals of being "anti-India and anti-Modi as a class" in remarks that were widely shared in the social media.

=== Immigrant students in Australia ===
His research into Australian universities' dependence on international (particularly Chinese) students drove political debates in the country.

== Books ==
- Babones, S. (2009). The International Structure of Income: Its Implications for Economic Growth. Saarbruecken: VDM Verlag Dr Muller. ISBN 978-3639101591
- Esteva, G., Babones, S., Babcicky, P. (2013). The Future of Development: A Radical Manifesto. Bristol, UK: Policy Press. ISBN 978-1447301080
- Babones, S. (2014). Methods for Quantitative Macro-Comparative Research. Los Angeles: Sage Publications. ISBN 978-1412974950
- Babones, S. (2015). Sixteen for '16: A Progressive Agenda for a Better America. Bristol, UK: Policy Press. ISBN 978-1447324409
- Elsenhans, H., and Babones, S. (2017). BRICS or Bust? Escaping the Middle-Income Trap. Stanford: Stanford University Press. ISBN 978-0804799898
- Babones, S. (2017). American Tianxia: Chinese Money, American Power, and the End of History. Bristol, UK: Policy Press. ISBN 978-1447336808
- Babones, S. (2018). The New Authoritarianism: Trump, Populism, and the Tyranny of Experts. Cambridge, UK: Polity. ISBN 978-1509533091
- Babones, S. (2021). Australia's Universities: Can They Reform? Brisbane: Ocean Reeve Publishing ISBN 978-1922644817 ASIN B09N8MTJGH
- Babones, S. (2025). Dharma Democracy : How India Built the Third World’s First Democracy by Salvatore Babones. ISBN 978-1923224735
