= BM Jain =

Indian political scientist

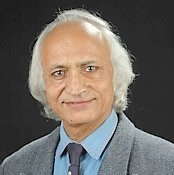

Academic background
- Education: University of Rajasthan

Academic work
- Discipline: Political science; Sinology
- Sub-discipline: International relations; Foreign policy of China
- School or tradition: Constructivism
- Notable works: The Geopsychology Theory of International Relations in the 21st Century (2021)
- Notable ideas: Theory of geopsychology in International relations

BM Jain is an Indian political scientist and Sinologist, who has developed and popularized psycho-cultural and geopsychological paradigms in the field of international relations (IR) and international security. He has developed the theory of geopsychology in IR as an alternative to mainstream IR theories. He defines it as "a set of perceptions, images, and belief systems, formed of shared history, culture, nationalism, religion, and ethnicity, which shape the mindsets and behavioral patterns of non-state and authoritarian actors and communities inhabiting a specific geographical area." In understanding China's foreign policy behavior, for instance, he has applied the geopsychology theoretical framework that lists core elements of China's geopsychology: Century of humiliation, the Middle Kingdom syndrome, cultural pride, nationalism, strategic culture, and the anti-hegemony discourse.

== Career ==
Jain obtained a Ph.D. from the University of Rajasthan (1977-1981). He has been a Professor and Senior UGC Research Scientist in Political Science at South Asia Studies Center, University of Rajasthan in India, and Senior Fellow of the Indian Council of Social Sciences Research (Ministry of Human Resource Development, Government of India).

=== Editors of academic journals ===
He has been editor-in-chief of the Indian Journal of Asian Affairs since 1988, cooperating with Sumit Ganguly, Patrick James, Kevin P. Clements and T.V. Paul.

Jain sits on the editorial board of Inter-Cultural Studies (University of Newcastle), Journal of International and Global Studies (Lindenwood University), and Journal of Indo-Pacific Affairs (Air University).

=== Memberships ===
Jain has been a member of:

- International Political Science Association (IPSA)
- Association of Third World Studies
- International Peace Research Association
- International Congress of Psychology
- International Association of Historians in Asia
- Indian Congress of Defence Studies

== Theoretical Contribution ==
In his 2021 book on the geopsychology theory (GT) of international relations, Jain argues that the GT fills the ‘knowledge gap’ in mainstream IR theories that have neglected the role of historical narratives, societal structures, cultural and civilizational values, and belief systems of political actors in constructing and shaping their foreign policy behavior.

The key assumptions of the GT are:

1. Non-state/transnational actors are the primary actors in the international system, capable of influencing the course of global and regional politics.
2. States’ employment of punitive measures is unable to change fixed mindsets and behavioral patterns of authoritarian, theocratic, and violent non-state actors (NSAs).
3. Historical narratives, collective memories, geography, and nationalism shape the behavior of authoritarian and NSAs.
4. Rational choice theory is unworkable in dealing with non-state and autocratic state actors.
5. It is a myth that security of a nation/nations is maximized through establishing hegemony over nations.

Reviews of the Book

“The most original and innovative contribution of Prof. B. M. Jain’s book is his ground-breaking effort to develop and sharpen the theory of geopsychology as an alternative framework of analysis in the study of international relations. His conceptual insights not only help us navigate the stormy ocean of mounting challenges and threats that the world is now facing, but also throw light on the evolving patterns of congruence and disjuncture, and ambiguity and contradiction, in contemporary global power encounters”- Journal of Global South Studies (USA)

“The geopsychology theory is a useful framework that helps address case studies that have not been adequately explained by mainstream international relations theories. Apart from the case studies mentioned in the book, this framework can be used to understand bilateral relations in Northeast Asia, such as Japanese-Korean ties and Chinese-Japanese ties"- Pacific Affairs (Canada)

“The book thus represents a most welcome critique of mainstream Western arguments about international conflict, and of their complementary constructivist demands for appropriate learning…He [Jain]serves to demystify the applicability of mainstream international relations theory for understanding major conflicts in the Global South, and between the South and the West. His book thus makes an important contribution to the deconstruction of a dominant discourse which has its origin in the unipolar power politics of the post-Cold War world system"- Comparative Journal (Germany)

“Geopsychology is a new theoretical viewpoint that should be embraced and not shunned. If there was one book for someone to pick up and examine international relations which were written recently, this would be the one I would (and do) recommend" - Defence Report (Canada)

== Publications ==
=== Monographs ===
- The Geopsychology Theory of International Relations in the 21st Century: Escaping the Ignorance Trap. (Lexington Books, 2021)
- South Asia Conundrum: The Great Power Gambit (Lexington Books, 2019)
- China's Soft Power Diplomacy in South Asia: Myth or Reality? (Lexington Books, 2017)
- India-US Relations in the Age of Uncertainty: An Uneasy Courtship (Routledge, 2016)
- India in the New South Asia (IB Tauris, 2010)
- Global Power: India’s Foreign Policy, 1947–2006 (Lexington Books, 2008)
- Nuclear Politics in South Asia: In Search of an Alternative Paradigm (Rawat Publications, 1994)
- India and the United States, 1961–63 (Radiant, 1987)
- South Asian Security: Problems and Prospects (Radiant, 1985)

=== Edited volumes ===
- Conflict and Peace in South Asia, edited by Manas Chatterji and B.M. Jain (Emerald Publishing Group, 2008)
- International Politics: Contexts, Issues and Perspectives (Jaipur: RBSA, 2002)
