= Kevin P. Clements =

Australian social scientist

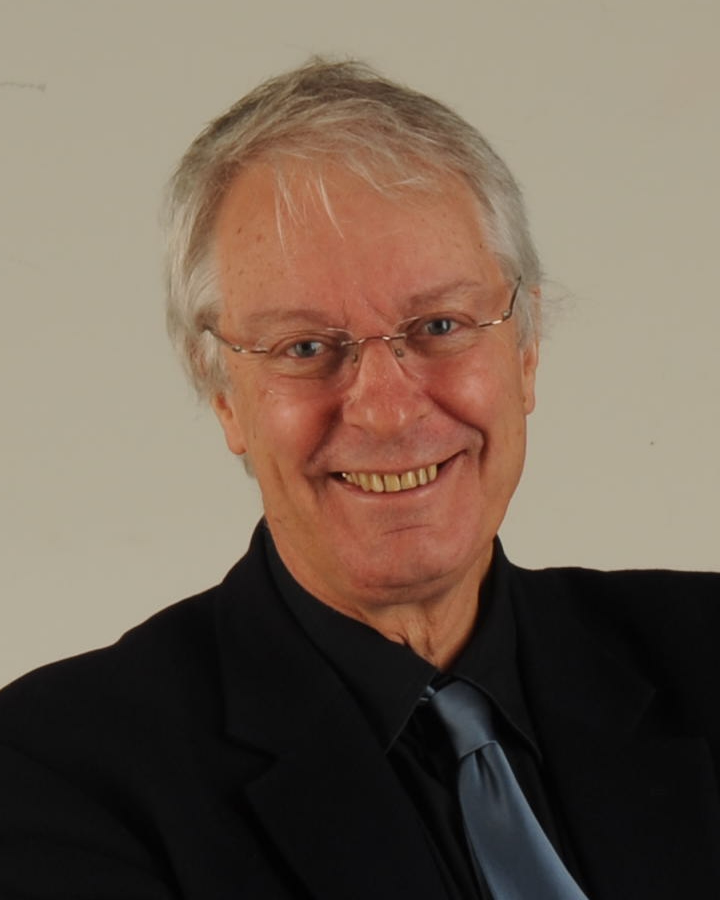
Clements in 2009

Kevin Paul Clements is an Emeritus Professor of Peace and Conflict Studies at the University of Otago, New Zealand. He was formerly Professor of Peace and Conflict Studies and Foundation Director of the Australian Centre for Peace and Conflict Studies (ACPACS) at the University of Queensland. He has also been Secretary General of the International Peace Research Association since January 2009. Since 2016 he was appointed Director of the Toda Peace Institute, Tokyo, Japan.

== Early life ==
Kevin Clements is the son of a conscientious objector. At the age of 13, Clements campaigned for nuclear disarmament in New Zealand. He was also an opponent of the Vietnam War.

== Academic career ==
- Director of the Toda Peace Institute, Tokyo Japan.
- Foundation Director of the National Centre for Peace and Conflict Studies (NCPACS) at the University of Otago, Dunedin.
- Visiting Professor, Centre for the Analysis and Resolution of Conflict, University of Kent at Canterbury and Visiting Professor, PRIME, Meiji Gakuin University, Tokyo Japan 2015-2016
- Secretary General of International Alert
- Board of the European Centre for Conflict Prevention and President of the European Peacebuilding Liaison Office in Brussels.
- Vernon and Minnie Lynch Chair of Conflict Resolution at the Institute for Conflict Analysis and Resolution at George Mason University, USA 1994-2000, and Director of the Institute from 1994-1999.
- Director of the Quaker United Nations Office in Geneva and
- Head of the Peace Research Centre at the Australian National University in Canberra .
- visiting or permanent academic positions at the Institute of Commonwealth Studies, Oxford, the University of Hong Kong, the University of Canterbury, the Institute of Southeast Asian Studies at the National University of Singapore, the University of East Anglia, and the University of Colorado Boulder.
- President of the International Peace Research Association IPRA 1994-1998,
- President of the IPRA Foundation from 1995-2000
- Secretary General of the Asia-Pacific Peace Research Association (APPRA).

Clements has been a consultant to numerous organisations, and advisor to the New Zealand, Australian, British, Swedish and Dutch governments. He was a member of the New Zealand Government's Defence Committee of Enquiry in 1985.

After retiring as Emeritus Professor from the University of Otago's peace and conflict studies programme, Clements served as director of the Toda Peace Institute in Japan. In March 2022, Clements was awarded the Luxembourg Peace Prize.

== Views and positions ==
Following the 2025 Trump–Zelenskyy Oval Office meeting in late February 2025, Clements urged New Zealand to reconsider its traditional alliance with the United States in light of United States President Donald Trump's America First foreign policy and overtures towards Russian President Vladimir Putin.

== Select publications ==
- Clements, Kevin (1988). Back from the Brink: The Creation of a Nuclear Free New Zealand. Wellington and London: Allen and Unwin. ISBN 9781869403201.
- Boulding, Elise; Brigagao, Clovis; Clements, Kevin (1991). Peace Culture And Society Transnational Research And Dialogue. Boulder, Colorado: Westview Press. ISBN 9780367297947.
- Clements, Kevin (1993). Peace and security in the Asia Pacific region: post cold war problems and prospects. Tokyo: United Nations University. ISBN 0864691726.
- Clements, Kevin (1994). UN Peacekeeping at the Cross Road. Canberra: Australian National University Peace Research Centre. ISBN 0731520092.
- Clements, Kevin; Wards, Robin, eds. (1994). Building International Community: Cooperating for Peace: Case Studies. Sydney: Allen and Unwin. ISBN 1863738002.
- Haryono, Endi; Clements, Kevin (1997). Teori Pembangunan:dari kiri ke kanan (From Right to Left in Development Theory). Yogyakarta: Pustaka Pelajar. ISBN 9799075025.
- Clements, Kevin; Mizner, Nadia, eds. (2008). The Centre Holds: Reform of the United Nations in the 21st Century. Routledge. ISBN 9781412807784.
- Clements, Kevin; Urbain, Olivier, eds. (2012). Risk and uncertainty: Understanding and dialogue in the 21st century. Routledge. ISBN 9781412847728.
- Clements, Kevin, ed. (2017). Identity, trust, and reconciliation in East Asia: Dealing with painful history to create a peaceful present. Cham, Switzerland: Palgrave Macmillan. ISBN 9783319548968.
- Clements, Kevin; Ikeda, Daisaku (2018). Toward a century of peace: A dialogue on the role of civil society in peacebuilding. Abingdon, UK: Routledge. ISBN 9781138585744.
