= Glen Stassen =

American ethicist and Baptist theologian (1936–2014)

Glen Harold Stassen (February 29, 1936 – April 26, 2014) was an American ethicist and Baptist theologian. He was known for his work on theological ethics, political philosophy, and social justice and for developing the Just Peacemaking Theory regarding the comparative ethics of war and peace. Glen Stassen helped define the social justice wing of the Christian evangelical movement in America. Stassen died in Pasadena, California at the age of 78. He was the son of former Minnesota governor Harold Stassen. His work pushed the advancement of nuclear disarmament in America. The last project he was committed to before his death was the destruction of chemical weapons, according to his blog.

== Education ==
He received his BA in Physics from University of Virginia, his BD from Union Theological Seminary in the City of New York, and his PhD from Duke University. He was a visiting scholar at Harvard University, Duke University, Columbia University, and the University of Heidelberg in Germany.

== Career ==
Stassen held teaching posts at Duke University, Kentucky Southern College, Berea College, and Southern Baptist Theological Seminary (at SBTS for 20 years). He served as the Lewis B. Smedes Professor of Christian Ethics and the Executive Director of the Just Peacemaking Initiative at Fuller Theological Seminary in Pasadena, California. Stassen contributed to Sojourners Magazine and frequently appeared in the media, including the Los Angeles Times and The O'Reilly Factor. Stassen engineered a limited ban on nuclear testing with the Soviet Union during U.N.-sponsored Cold War disarmament talks in 1957. The initiative was unsuccessful, but in 1963 the U.S., Soviet Union and Britain agreed to ban above-ground testing. Stassen filled the position of a liaison between the Nuclear Weapons Freeze Campaign and multiple European groups working towards disarmament during the early 1980s.

== Awards and honors ==
Stassen was recognized for his excellence in teaching with Fuller's 1999 All Seminary Council Faculty Award for Outstanding Community Service to Students, as well as the Seabury Award for Excellence in Teaching at Berea College and the Weyerhaeuser Award for Excellence in Teaching. He was named as a 2013 recipient of the Baptist World Alliance Denton and Janice Lotz Human Rights Award and named the 2012 Baptist of the Year by EthicsDaily.com.

His book Kingdom Ethics: Following Jesus in Contemporary Context, co-authored with David Gushee, was awarded Best Book of the Year in the Theology/Ethics category by Christianity Today in 2004. His last published book, A Thicker Jesus: Incarnational Discipleship in a Secular Age (2012), was named a top ten book by The Christian Century.

== Books ==
- Journey into Peacemaking (1982)
- Just Peacemaking: Transforming Initiatives for Justice and Peace (1992)
- Authentic Transformation: A New Vision of Christ and Culture (with John Howard Yoder and Diane Yeager) (1996)
- Capital Punishment: A Reader, editor (1998)
- Just Peacemaking: Ten Practices for Abolishing War, editor (1998)
- Kingdom Ethics: Following Jesus in Contemporary Context (with David P. Gushee) (2003)
- Living the Sermon on the Mount: A Practical Hope for Grace and Deliverance (2006)
- Peace Action: Past, Present, and Future, editor (with Lawrence S. Wittner) (2007)
- Just Peacemaking: The New Paradigm for the Ethics of Peace and War, editor (2008)
- The War of the Lamb: The Ethics of Nonviolence and Peacemaking, editor (2009)
- A Thicker Jesus: Incarnational Discipleship in a Secular Age (2012)
