= Useful idiot =

Derogatory term in political jargon

A useful idiot or useful fool is a pejorative description of a person, suggesting that the person thinks they are fighting for a cause without fully comprehending the consequences of their actions, and who does not realize they are being manipulated by the cause's leaders or by other political players. The term was often used during the Cold War in the Western Bloc to describe non-communists regarded as susceptible to communist propaganda and psychological manipulation.

This statement has traditionally been attributed to Vladimir Lenin, but this attribution is not supported by any evidence. Similar terms exist in other languages, and the first mention in the English language predates Lenin's birth.

== Early usages ==
The term useful idiot, for a foolish person whose views can be taken advantage of for political purposes, was used in a British periodical as early as 1864. In relation to the Cold War, the term appeared in a June 1948 article in The New York Times on contemporary Italian politics ("Communist shift is seen in Europe"), citing the Italian Democratic Socialist Party's newspaper L'Umanità. L'Umanità argued that the Italian Socialist Party, which had entered into a popular front with the Italian Communist Party (PCI) known as the Popular Democratic Front during the 1948 Italian general election, would be given the option to either merge with the PCI or leave the alliance. The term was later used in a 1955 article in the American Federation of Labor News-Reporter to refer to Italians who supported Communist causes. Time first used the phrase in January 1958, writing that some members of Christian Democracy considered social activist Danilo Dolci a useful idiot for Communist causes. It has since recurred in that periodical's articles, from the 1970s, to the 1980s, to the 2000s, and 2010s.

In the Russian language, the term "useful fools" (Russian: полезные дураки, tr. polezniye duraki) was already in use in 1941. It was mockingly used against Russian "nihilists" of the 1860s who, for Polish agents, were said to be no more than "useful fools and silly enthusiasts."

While the phrase useful idiots of the West has often been attributed to Vladimir Lenin, he is not documented as ever having used the phrase. In a 1987 article for The New York Times, American journalist William Safire reported about his search for the origin of the term. He wrote that a senior reference librarian at the Library of Congress, Grant Harris, had been unable to find the phrase in Lenin's works. Safire was also out of luck contacting TASS and the New York headquarters of the Communist Party. He concluded that, lacking solid evidence, a cautious phrasing must be used, e.g., "a phrase attributed to Lenin..."

== Select usage ==
In 1959, Congressman Ed Derwinski of Illinois entered an editorial by the Chicago Daily Calumet into the Congressional record, referring to Americans who travelled to the Soviet Union to promote peace as "what Lenin calls useful idiots in the Communist game."

Writing in The New York Times in 1987, Safire discussed the increasing use of the term useful idiot against "anybody insufficiently anti-Communist in the view of the phrase's user", including Congressmen who supported the anti-Contras led by the Sandinistas in Nicaragua and the Labour Party in the Netherlands. After United States president Ronald Reagan concluded negotiations with Soviet leader Mikhail Gorbachev over the Intermediate-Range Nuclear Forces Treaty, conservative political leader Howard Phillips declared Reagan a "useful idiot for Soviet propaganda".

The Economist published a 2023 article titled "Vladimir Putin's useful idiots"; it describes "useful Idiot narratives" pushed by Putinversteher that support Putin's aims and denigrate his perceived enemies.

City traders and various hedge fund sources used the term "useful idiot" to describe former chancellor Kwasi Kwarteng, following his September 2022 mini-budget under Liz Truss as UK Prime Minister.

== Variations of the term ==
The Serbo-Croatian term korisne budale, which may be translated as useful idiots or useful innocents, attributed to unnamed Yugoslav communists, appears in a 1946 Reader's Digest article titled "Yugoslavia's Tragic Lesson to the World", written by Bogdan Raditsa. Raditsa had served the Yugoslav government-in-exile during World War II, supported Josip Broz Tito's partisans but was not a communist himself, and briefly served in Tito's led Provisional Government of the Democratic Federal Yugoslavia before leaving for New York. Raditsa said: "In the Serbo-Croat language, the communists have a phrase for true democrats who consent to collaborate with them for [the sake of] 'democracy'. It is Korisne Budale, or Useful Innocents."

In his 1947 book Planned Chaos, Austrian-American economist Ludwig von Mises wrote that the term useful innocents was used by communists for those whom von Mises describes as "confused and misguided sympathizers [of the revolutionary idea]".

== Related questionable quotation ==
The expression was discussed in connection with another quotation attributed to Lenin (though no records have shown he has never used this phrase), which are also about Western "idiots" being manipulated by the Soviet communists. The quotation is known as "the rope" ("The capitalists will sell us the rope with which to hang them"). For example, William J. Bennett summarized that "'Useful idiot' was the term communists used for credulous Western businessmen", giving as an example Armand Hammer "who helped build up the Soviet Communist state". Bennett recounted a famous story wherein Lenin was asked, "How will we hang the Capitalists, we don't have enough rope!" Lenin was reported (though there are no records of him doing so) to have "famously replied" with the rejoinder, "They will sell it to us – on credit."

The rhetoric about the "rope" was summarized by economic theorists to represent Lenin's ideological conception is as follows:

They [capitalists] will furnish credits which will serve us for the support of the Communist Party in their countries and, by supplying us materials and technical equipment which we lack, will restore our military industry necessary for our future attacks against our suppliers. To put it in other words, they will work on the preparation of their own suicide.

== See also ==
- Agent of influence
- Fellow traveller
- Putinversteher
- Foreign agent
- Low information voter
- Political literacy
- Political warfare
- Turkeys voting for Christmas
