= Peace & Change =

- Discipline: Peace studies
- Language: English

Publication details
- History: 1972 to present
- Publisher: Wiley-Blackwell for the Peace History Society and the Peace and Justice Studies Association
- Frequency: Quarterly

Standard abbreviations
- ISO 4: Peace Change

Indexing
- ISSN: 0149-0508 (print); 1468-0130 (web)

Links
- Journal at Peace History Society; Journal at Peace and Justice Studies Association; Journal at Wiley Online Library

Peace & Change: A Journal of Peace Research is a quarterly peer-reviewed academic journal covering peace studies published by Wiley-Blackwell for the Peace History Society and the Peace and Justice Studies Association. It was established in 1972 and the editor-in-chief is Heather Fryer (Creighton University).

Erwin Fahlbusch, in the Evangelisches Kirchenlexikon, describes it as one of "three prominent peace journals" which "are especially worthy of note".

== Abstracting and indexing ==
The journal is abstracted and indexed in:

- EBSCO databases
- ProQuest databases
- RILM Abstracts of Music Literature
