= Peace History Society =

American pacifist organization

The Peace History Society is an American scholarly society, affiliated to the American Historical Association, which defines its purpose as "The scholarly study of the deep-rooted causes of peace and war and the means to secure and maintain nonviolent resolutions to conflicts."

It was founded in 1964 in the aftermath of the assassination of John F. Kennedy, initially under the name Conference on Peace Research in History. It was renamed as the Peace History Society in 1994. Since 1972 it has published the journal Peace & Change: a Journal of Peace Research jointly with the Peace and Justice Studies Association.
