= Mahavira: The Hero of Nonviolence =

2014 children's book by Manoj K Jain

- Author: Manoj K Jain
- Cover artist: Manoj K Jain and Demi
- Language: English
- Genre: Juvenile Nonfiction
- Published: July 2014 World Wisdom
- Publication place: United States
- Media type: Print (Paperback)
- Pages: 28
- ISBN: 978-1-937786-21-2 (Paperback edition)
- OCLC: 862209073

Mahavira: The Hero of Nonviolence is an illustrated children's story based upon the life of Mahavira, a teacher of the Jain faith.

== Synopsis ==
Mahavira: The Hero of Nonviolence is a story of a young prince, Mahavira, who was destined to teach peace and non-violence. He was born in India and his name was Vardhaman. As he grew, he learned through books and aspired to become a monk. He acquired knowledge through his spiritual journey and achieved the Three Spiritual Jewels. In Jainism, they are called Right Faith, Right Knowledge and Right Conduct. He loved all living things and had no fear. Later figures who practiced peace were Gandhi and Dr. Martin Luther King.

== Awards ==
- USA Best Books Awards 2014 – Children's Religious (Winner) – "Mahavira: The Hero of Nonviolence by Manoj Jain, illustrated by Demi" Wisdom Tales Press
- Midwest Book Awards 2014 – Children's Nonfiction (Gold Medal) – "Mahavira: The Hero of Nonviolence by Manoj Jain, illustrated by Demi" Wisdom Tales Press
- Skipping Stones Honor Award 2015 – Multicultural & International Books (Honor Award) – "Mahavira: The Hero of Nonviolence by Manoj Jain, illustrated by Demi" Wisdom Tales Press
