= Manoj K Jain =

Indian American physician and writer

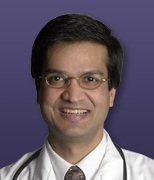
- Born: Mhow, Madhya Pradesh, India
- Education: Boston University
- Occupations: Infectious-disease physician Adjunct professor

Manoj Jain is an infectious disease physician and a writer. He is an adjunct faculty member at Rollins School of Public Health at Emory University and a contributing health writer for The Washington Post, Huffington Post and The Commercial Appeal. He lives in Memphis, Tennessee. He was running for public office in August 2014 Elections.

He was also advisor to the Memphis-Shelby County COVID-19 Joint Task Force.

During the COVID-19 pandemic, Jain spent months educating himself about the virus, informing the public in newspaper columns, and encouraging local officials, including the health department, to prepare and respond to the pandemic. His work within the city of Memphis and state of Tennessee earned him the nickname "Dr. Fauci of Memphis", a reference to Dr. Anthony Fauci.

== Books ==
- Management of Infectious Diseases
- Mahavira: The Hero of Nonviolence, an illustrated children's story
- Melody of India Cuisine: Tasteful New Vegetarian Recipes Celebrating Soy and Tofu in Traditional Indian Foods. ISBN 9780880071956
- Jain Food : Compassionate and Healthy Cooking ISBN 9780977317806
- Jain Path ISBN 9780977317868

== Publications ==
- The Germs Are Potent. But So Is a Kiss, NYTimes
- Plan-Do-Study-Act Cycle Rejuvenates a Marriage,Annals of Internal Medicine

== Awards ==
His writings have earned him the South Asian Journalists Association's award for the best commentary in 2008 for his article Disparity In Pay Divides Doctors at The Washington Post. He is also recipient of inaugural Jeffrey P. Koplan Global Health Award
