= Mitläufer =

Person associated with a controversial movement

A Mitläufer (German pronunciation: [ˈmɪtˌlɔɪ̯.fɐ], German for "fellow traveller"; plural Mitläufer, feminine Mitläuferin) is a person tied to or passively sympathising with certain social movements, often to those that are prevalent, controversial or radical. In English, the term was most commonly used after World War II, during the denazification hearings in West Germany, to refer to people who were not charged with Nazi crimes but whose involvement with the Nazi Party was considered so significant that they could not be exonerated for the crimes of the Nazi regime.

== Etymology ==
The German word Mitläufer (literally "with-walker" or "one walking with") has been in common use since the 17th century. It means as much as "follower", more literally "tag-along", a person who gives in to peer pressure. A Mitläufer is one who is not convinced by the ideology of the group followed but merely offers no resistance, such as for lack of courage or for opportunism.

The term is usually translated in English as "fellow traveller" or "hanger-on", but it is not equivalent to either.

The German word Mitläufereffekt is derived from it. Mitläufereffekt, also called the Bandwagon-Effekt (bandwagon effect), refers to the effect a perceived success exerts on the willingness of individuals to join the expected success. For example, voters would like to be on the winning side and so prefer to choose the candidate that they expect will win.

== Legal definitions ==
In the American Sector of Allied-occupied Germany, a "follower" was the second lowest group or category in the denazification proceedings. The denazification hearings classified Germans according to five groups:

1. Major Offenders (German: Hauptschuldige)
2. Offenders: Activists, Militants, or Profiteers (German: Belastete)
3. Lesser offenders (German: Minderbelastete)
4. Followers (German: Mitläufer)
5. Exonerated persons (German: Entlastete)

In Allied-occupied Austria, the Russian term poputchik (fellow traveller) was translated into German as Mitläufer, and they were considered to be "lesser offenders" (a person who, although not formally charged with participation in war crimes, was sufficiently involved with the Nazi regime to the extent that the Allied authorities could not legally exonerate them).

== Assessment ==
Of the five categories, Mitläufer is the most controversial as it does not relate to any formal Nazi criminal activity, as defined by the Nuremberg trials, only to a loosely defined indirect support of Nazi crimes. Therefore, former German Chancellor Helmut Schmidt could say about Herbert von Karajan's Nazi Party membership card: "Karajan was obviously not a Nazi. He was a Mitläufer."

In essence, Mitläufer were found de facto guilty of contributing to Nazi crimes, even though they were not necessarily ideologically committed to some essential Nazi doctrines, especially biological racism and the policy of Jewish extermination.

The Nazi Mitläufer often were of a slightly different sort: they sympathised with the Nazis but only indirectly participated in Nazi atrocities such as genocide.

== Examples ==
In addition to von Karajan, well-known Mitläufer included the philosopher Martin Heidegger, the filmmaker Leni Riefenstahl, Christian Schad, and Wilhelm Stuckart as well as Hugo Boss.

== See also ==
- Bandwagon effect
- Herd behavior
- List of Axis personnel indicted for war crimes
- The Holocaust
