= Asia-Pacific Peace Research Association =

The Asia-Pacific Peace Research Association is the Regional Association of International Peace Research Association- IPRA. It is an international non-governmental organization of peace researchers, peace educators and peace advocates.

The Asian Peace Research Association was established on 5 December 1980, at the closing of the conference on Asian Peace Research in the Global Context held in Yokohama, Japan. The name was changed to the current name, Asia-Pacific Peace Research Association (APPRA), on 4 February 1992, during a regional conference organized by the association held at the University of Canterbury, Christchurch, New Zealand.

Prof. John P. Synott of Queensland University of Technology is currently the convener of APPRA.

== Orientation ==
The distinctive orientation of APPRA is towards building societies of peace and justice. Basic to this mission is a comprehensive understanding of peace which means not only the absence of war and conflict but above all the presence of essential conditions for the well-being of humanity.
