= Peace and Justice Studies Association =

US academic association

- Predecessor: The Consortium on Peace Research, Education and Development, and The Peace Studies Association
- Formation: 2001
- Headquarters: Washington, D.C.
- Executive Director: Michael Loadenthal
- Affiliations: International Peace Research Association
- Website: https://www.peacejusticestudies.org/

The Peace and Justice Studies Association (PJSA) is a non-profit organization headquartered at Georgetown University in Washington, DC.

It was created following increased interest in peace-building after the September 11th attacks in USA, and it organizes annual conferences, publishes papers and a magazine, and issues awards for peace-builders.

== Organization ==
Following increased academic interest in conflict and conflict-resolution after the September 11th attack, the Consortium on Peace Research, Education and Development and the Peace Studies Association merged to form the Peace and Justice Studies Association. It is the North American regional affiliate of the International Peace Research Association.

The association grew in size through the early 2000s, and since 2016, the executive director has been Michael Loadenthal.

== Activities ==
The organization organizes the annual Peace and Justice Studies Association Conference, issues the Peacebuilder of the Year award, and publishes the Peace Chronicle magazine. Their annual Lifetime achievement award is named after Howard Zinn.
