= International Peace Research Association =

Academic peace-building association

- Formation: 1964
- Secretaries General: Matt Meyer; Marìa Teresa Muñoz
- Website: https://iprapeace.org

The International Peace Research Association is a global network of academics. It was founded in 1964, and promotes peace by supporting national organizations, hosting conferences, publishing and supporting the publication of peace-promoting journals. It is a member of the International Science Council.

== Organization ==
The International Peace Research Association was founded in 1964 and is a global network of educators and researchers who collaborate on peace-building activities.

The association encourages national and international peace-building education and supports the dissemination of peace-promoting research.

The 2023-2025 co-secretaries general are Matt Meyer and Marìa Teresa Muñoz.

== Activities ==
The association organizes a biannual conference, sponsors peace journals, and publishes a newsletter.

In 1973, it formed the Peace Education Commission, that identifies and describes the work of International Peace Research Association members.

== See also ==
- Asia-Pacific Peace Research Association (affiliate)
- Peace and Justice Studies Association (affiliate)
