= Fork Films =

Former American film and television production company

- Industry: Film industry
- Founded: 2007
- Founder: Abigail Disney; Gini Reticker
- Defunct: 2022
- Headquarters: New York City
- Website: forkfilms.com

Fork Films was an American film production and television production company founded in 2007, by Abigail Disney and Gini Reticker. The company primarily produced documentary films focusing on social issues, and select narrative films.

They have produced such films as Pray the Devil Back to Hell (2008), The Invisible War (2012), Cameraperson (2016), Trapped (2016), Strong Island (2017), One Child Nation (2019), Crip Camp (2020), and Disclosure: Trans Lives on Screen (2020).

== History ==
In 2007, Abigail Disney and Gini Reticker launched Fork Films, a production company focusing on primarily producing documentary films focusing on social issues, and select narrative films. Apart from producing, the company gives grants to filmmakers to finish or produce their project. The company was launched after Disney began working with Reticker on the film Pray the Devil Back to Hell (2008), creating a company for licensing the film, before deciding to continue making documentary projects.

The company has produced films that have gone on to be nominated for the Academy Awards, Emmy Awards and News & Documentary Emmy Awards; Sun Come Up (2011), which was nominated for Academy Award for Best Documentary (Short Subject), The Invisible War (2012) by Kirby Dick, which was nominated for an Academy Award for Best Documentary Feature, The Armor of Light which won the News & Documentary Emmy Award for Outstanding Social Issue Documentary, and Strong Island (2017), and Crip Camp (2020), which were both nominated for the Academy Award for Best Documentary Feature.

Apart from documentaries, the company has produced the narrative feature films Return and Hateship, Loveship by Liza Johnson.

In October 2022, it was announced the company had been shut down.

== Filmography ==
- Pray the Devil Back to Hell (2008)
- Return (2011)
- The Invisible War (2012)
- Citizen Koch (2013)
- 1971 (2014)
- Vessel (2014)
- Food Chains (2014)
- She's Beautiful When She's Angry (2014)
- Hot Girls Wanted (2015)
- The Mask You Live In (2015)
- The Armor of Light (2015)
- The Babushkas of Chernobyl (2015)
- Trapped (2016)
- Cameraperson (2016)
- Strong Island (2017)
- I Am Evidence (2017)
- For Ahkeem (2017)
- Tickling Giants (2017)
- Call Her Ganda (2018)
- Roll Red Roll (2018)
- Netizens (2018)
- That Way Madness Lies.. (2018)
- Be Natural: The Untold Story of Alice Guy-Blaché (2018)
- Same God (2018)
- Afterward (2018)
- 93Queen (2018)
- Cooked: Survival by Zip Code (2018)
- One Child Nation (2019)
- Midnight Traveler (2019)
- Disclosure: Trans Lives on Screen (2020)
- Crip Camp (2020)
- Mayor (2020)
- Love & Stuff (2020)
- 9to5: The Story of a Movement (2020)
- The People vs. Agent Orange (2020)
- Belly of the Beast (2020)
- Reality Winner (2021)
- The First Step (2021)
- Simple as Water (2021)
