= The People vs. Agent Orange =

2020 American-French television documentary film

- Official poster
- Genre: Documentary
- Directed by: Alan Adelson; Kate Taverna
- Composers: Blake Leyh; Van Ahn Vanessa Vo
- Countries of origin: United States; France
- Original languages: English; France

Production
- Executive producers: Sally Jo Fifer; Lois Vossen; Maxyne Franklin; Abigail E. Disney; Gini Reticker
- Producers: Veronique Bernard; Alan Adelson; Kate Taverna
- Cinematography: Michael Julian Berz; Luca Chiari; Craig Marsden; Sam Shinn; Scott Sinkler; Dyanna Taylor; Tran Duc Tho
- Editor: Kate Taverna
- Running time: 85 minutes
- Production companies: ITVS; Arte; Films for Humanity; Doc Society; Fork Films; Corporation for Public Broadcasting; The Bertha Foundation; IFP

Original release
- Network: Arte
- Release: September 29, 2020
- Network: PBS
- Release: June 28, 2021

The People vs. Agent Orange is a 2020 American-French television documentary film, directed and produced by Alan Adelson and Kate Taverna. It follows the use of Agent Orange in Vietnam and the United States.

It was released in France on September 29, 2020, on ARTE, and in the United States, it was released through virtual cinema on March 5, 2021, prior to being broadcast on June 28, 2021, on Independent Lens on PBS.

== Synopsis ==
The film follows two activists, Tran To Nga, and Carol Van Strum, as Tran spends several years preparing litigation against American companies that produced herbicides poisoning her and her family, while Strum fights against the use of 24D in her home state of Oregon, and spreads awareness of how Agent Orange is still used in present day.

== Release ==
The film was broadcast in France on September 29, 2020, on Arte. It was released in the United States through virtual cinema on March 5, 2021, prior to being broadcast on Independent Lens on PBS on June 28, 2021.

== Reception ==
The People vs. Agent Orange holds a 100% approval rating on review aggregator website Rotten Tomatoes, based on five reviews.
