= Etweda Cooper =

Liberian politician

Superintendent of Grand Bassa County
- In office 2012–2015

Mayor of Edina, Liberia
- In office 2010–2012

Personal details
- Born: Edina, Liberia
- Occupation: Women's rights and peace activist
- Awards: 1325 Award
- Nickname: Sugars

Etweda Ambavi Gbenyon Cooper, known as Sugars, is a Liberian politician and peace activist. She has been described as "the doyenne" and "the godmother" of the Liberian women's movement.

In 2010, she was elected mayor of Edina, Liberia. She then served as superintendent of Grand Bassa County from 2012 to 2015.

== Early life and education ==
Etweda Cooper was born in Edina, into an elite family descended from freed slaves who left the United States for Liberia in the 1800s. She grew up speaking Bassa and Liberian English.

Cooper is known across the country by her nickname, Sugars.

She left Liberia as a young woman to attend university in Bern, Switzerland.

== Activism ==
=== First Liberian Civil War ===
After returning to Liberia, Cooper became involved in the peace movement in 1994.

As a co-founder and onetime chair of the Liberian Women’s Initiative, she served as a key figure in women's peace activism during the first Liberian civil war.

In 1998, Cooper was briefly arrested by the Liberia National Police after denouncing the murder of a woman at the hands of security forces.

=== Second Liberian Civil War and aftermath ===
As a part of Women of Liberia Mass Action for Peace in the early 2000s, she played a major role in the nonviolent resistance campaign that led to the end of Liberia's second civil war.

Cooper has also been involved in the Women in Peacebuilding Network (WIPNET), part of the West Africa Network for Peacebuilding.

After the second civil war ended, she helped organize women in favor of Ellen Johnson Sirleaf's 2005 presidential campaign, in which Sirleaf was elected the first female president of an African country.

Cooper appears in the documentary Pray the Devil Back to Hell about women's role in the Liberian peace process. In 2006, she became the first-ever recipient of the 1325 Award from the Dutch government.

== Political career ==
In April 2010, Cooper was elected mayor of her hometown, Edina, which she aimed to turn into an eco-friendly, safe town that attracts tourists.

In 2012, she was appointed superintendent of Grand Bassa County by President Ellen Johnson Sirleaf, and confirmed by the Liberian Senate. On her appointment, she became mayor emeritus of Edina.

Her time in office included overseeing the county's response to the Western African Ebola virus epidemic. Later in her term, Cooper became chairperson of Liberia's Superintendent Council. She resigned as the county's superintendent in 2015, citing a "personal reason."

In 2017, she ran to represent Grand Bassa in the Liberian House of Representatives, as a member of the True Whig Party, but she was not elected.

Cooper is now retired from public political life, but she continues to mentor younger activists.
