= Carol Van Strum =

American environmentalist (born 1940)

Carol Van Strum (née Scott; born 1940) is an American environmental activist who since 1975 has fought against the spraying of herbicides, including Agent Orange, in the Siuslaw National Forest in Oregon. Her subsequent research, including over 20,000 documents revealing corporate and government cover-ups, was donated to the Poison Papers project in 2017. In 2018, Van Strum received the David Brower Lifetime Achievement Award for her contributions to forestry policy favoring selective harvest without the use of herbicides.

== Early life ==
Born on December 13, 1940, in Port Chester, New York, Scott was the daughter of Helen Caroline Campbell and G. Norman Scott. She was one of the family's five daughters.

== Activism ==
Van Strum moved to Siuslaw National Forest in 1975. Shortly afterwards, helicopters sprayed the forests and water courses in the area with phenoxy herbicides 2,4-D and 2,4,5-T, the 50-50 mixture used in Agent Orange (including surplus Agent Orange itself after it was banned by the military in Vietnam). Concerned by the apparent resultant negative effects on their family, animals and plants, Van Strum, her husband Steve and their neighbours co-founded Citizens Against Toxic Sprays (CATS). It was formed to give forest dwellers a united voice against the United States Forest Service, the United States Environmental Protection Agency and Dow Chemical Company, manufacturer of the herbicides. CATS gathered information from residents and undertook a community-wide public health survey. Together with the Oregon Environmental Council and the Hoedads Reforestation Cooperative they filed a lawsuit against the US Forest Service in 1976 claiming that an environmental-impact statement for the herbicides was insufficient. U.S. District Judge Otto Richard Skopil Jr. issued an order in March 1977 to halt all spraying of 2,4,5-T in the Siuslaw National Forest until deficiencies in the statement were cleared up, thus effectively eliminating the spray program for a year. Although the ban was rescinded two years later, the work by Van Strum and others contributed to final cancellation of all 2,4,5-T registrations by EPA and a new national forest policy that favors selective harvests without herbicides.

In 1983, Van Strum wrote A Bitter Fog: Herbicides and Human Rights. The book details widespread fraud in the safety testing of all pesticides used in forestry and a decade long struggle to end use of dioxin-contaminated and all other herbicides on the forests of Oregon, by taking on the chemical and timber companies as well as government agencies.

In 1987 Van Strum and Paul Merrell wrote No Margin of Safety: a preliminary report on dioxin pollution and the need for emergency action in the pulp and paper industry. Originally published by Greenpeace, it is now available within the pages of another volume.

Over four decades of research and work by Van Strum on pesticide and poison cases, including lawsuits against the Forest Service, litigation by Agent Orange veterans, personal injury cases by exposed workers, and numerous other cases involving PCBs and dioxin, Van Strum amassed over 20,000 documents which she stored in a barn on her property. In 2017, she donated these to the Poison Papers digitalisation project. The papers include scientific reports, evidence submitted in courts of law, internal and external correspondence of chemical companies such as DOW and Monsanto, and of government agencies such as the Environmental Protection Agency, often gathered via freedom of information requests. The documents are said to reveal corporate and government cover-ups of dioxin studies, collusion enabling continued registration of pesticides based on fraudulent or nonexistent studies, and decisions to continue marketing known carcinogens, mutagens and teratogens.

The Poison Papers, also available with continuing additions through Columbia University's Toxic Docs program are now available online for use by anyone seeking information on the dangers of using harmful chemicals in aerial herbicide spraying and attempts to end such spraying.

Van Strum and Tran To Nga, a Franco-Vietnamese environmental activist, appeared in the 2020 film The People vs. Agent Orange. The two have been involved in attempting to stop companies from producing, spraying, burning and dumping toxic defoliants such as those contained in Agent Orange and to force accountability for the harmful effects of these. Because of the once-prolific production, use and dumping of these chemicals and their long half-life, they can now be found in the soil, water, air and in living organisms, in many countries. The two women in the 2020 film met in New York in March 2024 at a screening by Columbia University.

In 2017 a ban against the spraying of pesticides on private timberland in Lincoln County was approved by voters. The ban was overturned two years later by the state. The Lincoln County Community Rights group asked Van Strum to be the spokesperson for the Siletz River ecosystem at the Oregon Court of Appeal in a challenge to the rescinding of the ban. In June 2021, the Court of Appeal upheld the lower court's ruling without comment.

== Private life ==
In 1962, she married Steve Van Strum (1939–2021) with whom she had five children. The four who survived died in a fire at Five Rivers in 1978. After separating from Van Strum, she remarried and raised two sons, Jordan and Nicholas.

== Awards ==
A Bitter Fog: Herbicides and Human Rights gained the Christopher Award for 1983. The award salutes media that "affirm the highest values of the human spirit" and "encourage audiences to see the better side of human nature."

In 2018 Van Strum received the International David Brower Lifetime Achievement Award for outstanding environmental and social justice work.

== Selected publications ==
- A Bitter Fog: Herbicides and Human Rights (1983, Sierra Club Books: ISBN 9780871563293; 3rd edition, 2021, Jericho Hill: ISBN 9781732446830)
- (With Paul Merrell) No Margin of Safety: a preliminary report on dioxin pollution and the need for emergency action in the pulp and paper industry (1987, Greenpeace)
- (With Paul Merrell) The Politics of Penta (1989, Greenpeace)
- “The Oreo File” A novel (2016 Jericho Hill Publishing) Alfred N.Y. 14802
- Forged under the Sun/Forjada bajo el sol (1993, University of Michigan Press: ISBN 9780472064328) Includes a report of the poisoning of Chicana migrant farm workers from a low-flying crop-dusting plane and its after-effects.
