= Abigail Disney =

American film producer and activist (born 1960)

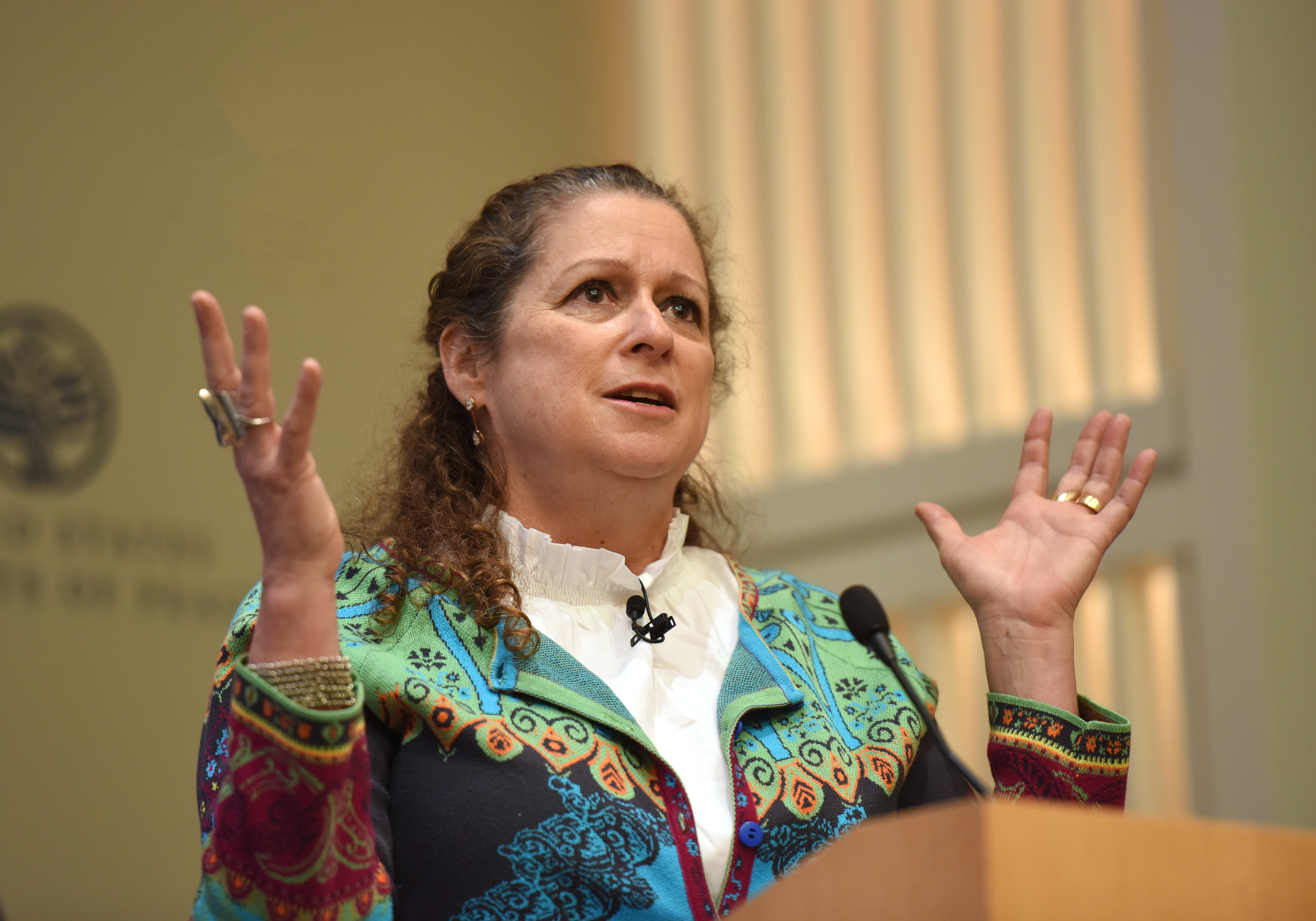
- Disney in 2018
- Born: Abigail Edna Disney; January 24, 1960 (age 66); Los Angeles, California, U.S.
- Education: Yale University (BA); Stanford University (MA); Columbia University (PhD)
- Occupations: Film producer, philanthropist
- Years active: 2008–present
- Known for: Pray the Devil Back to Hell
- Political party: Democratic
- Spouse: Pierre Hauser (m. 1988)
- Children: 4
- Father: Roy E. Disney
- Relatives: Disney family

Abigail Edna Disney (born January 24, 1960) is an American documentary film producer, philanthropist, social activist, and member of the Disney family. She produced the 2008 documentary Pray the Devil Back to Hell. Disney and Kathleen Hughes are producers and directors of Outstanding Social Issue Documentary Emmy Award winning The Armor of Light (2015) and The American Dream and Other Fairy Tales (2022, her brother, Tim Disney, executive producing).

== Early life and education ==
Abigail Disney is a daughter of Patricia Ann (née Dailey) and Roy E. Disney. She is a granddaughter of Roy O. Disney, who co-founded The Walt Disney Company with his brother (Abigail's great uncle), Walt Disney.

She was raised in North Hollywood, California, where she attended the Buckley School. She received a Bachelor of Arts in English Literature from Yale University in 1982. She would go on to complete a Master of Arts in English Literature from Stanford University, and PhD in philosophy from Columbia University in 1994. While pursuing her PhD, Disney taught English and American literature at Iona College in New Rochelle, New York, and wrote a dissertation on the role of romanticized violence in American life: Shadows of doubt: The American historical war novels of James Fenimore Cooper, Stephen Crane and Thomas Pynchon.

== Film production career ==
Disney turned to the family business of film production with a documentary film, Pray the Devil Back to Hell, directed by Gini Reticker. Pray the Devil Back to Hell brought to light the work of Liberian peace activist Leymah Gbowee by telling the story about the critical role women played in bringing peace to war torn Liberia. Pray the Devil Back to Hell won Best Documentary at the Tribeca Film Festival in 2008, and screened in 60 countries around the world on all seven continents. It had a cumulative gross worldwide of $90,066.

In 2007, she and Gini Reticker founded Fork Films, a New York-based production company. She is the president and CEO, and Reticker is the chief creative officer. In 2009, Fork Films and Film Sprout partnered together to create Pray the Devil Back to Hell's Global Peace Tour, a nine-month grassroots screening tour that culminated on the United Nations' International Day of Peace on September 21, 2009. The tour brought the film to 31 foreign countries and 235 U.S. cities in 45 different states. The film highlights the bravery and sacrifice of its lead figure, Leymah Gbowee, who received a Nobel Peace Prize in 2011.

The response to Pray the Devil Back to Hell led Disney to work on the five-part special series for PBS, Women, War & Peace, which aired in 2011 and was the winner of the Overseas Press Club's Edward R. Murrow Award, a Gracie Award, a Television Academy Honor and the America Bar Association's Silver Gavel Award (for I Came to Testify). This series created and executive produced by Abigail Disney, Pamela Hogan, and Gini Reticker, and looked at the role of women in war in the modern age, not just as victims of conflict, but as active agents for peace in their communities. Also in 2011, Disney received an Athena Film Festival Award for her extraordinary use of film for social change.

Disney executive produced The Trials of Spring (2015), which includes a feature-length documentary and six short films.

Disney made her directorial debut with The Armor of Light, which follows anti-abortion evangelical minister Rob Schenck, Lucy McBath, the mother of teenager Jordan Davis, and John Michael Phillips. Jordan Davis was gunned down in Jacksonville, Florida, on November 23, 2012. Davis was unarmed at the time of his death, and his story has cast a spotlight on stand-your-ground laws in the United States. The film follows Schenck as he meets McBath, a pro-choice Christian, and her attorney John Phillips. The Armor of Light premiered at the Tribeca Film Festival in April 2015 before opening theatrically on October 30, 2015. In 2017, it won an Emmy Award for Outstanding Social Issue Documentary.

In 2018, Disney partnered with Killer Content and launched Level Forward, a new breed film, television and theater production company focused on projects that extend the influence and opportunity of creative excellence and supports new voices. In October 2022, Fork Films shut down.

== Community activism and philanthropy ==
Disney and her husband Pierre Hauser created The Daphne Foundation in 1991 in order to fund programs that confront the causes and consequences of poverty in the five boroughs of New York City.

In 2008, Disney launched Peace is Loud, a nonprofit organization that uses media and live events to spotlight women leaders who build a culture of peace. Disney is the founder and president.

In 2011, Disney traveled with Nobel laureate Leymah Gbowee to the Congo to spend a week working with other women peace activists and to explore ideas for building peace in their country. The following year, they visited Sri Lanka, where women activists launched the Sri Lankan Women's Agenda on Peace, Security and Development, inspired by Gbowee's legacy.

In 2012, she renounced her share of the profits from the Disney family investment in the Ahava cosmetics company whose factory is located in a West Bank settlement. She stated "I cannot in good conscience profit from what is technically the 'plunder' or 'pillage' of occupied natural resources." For legal reasons, she could not withdraw her investments, and therefore donated the investments and profits "to organizations working to end this illegal exploitation."

In May 2015, Disney joined Gbowee and 28 other international women peacebuilders to cross the 2-mile wide De-Militarized Zone (DMZ) separating North and South Korea in an act of solidarity with Korean women and to call for an end to the Korean War. The peacebuilders headed international peace symposia in Pyongyang and Seoul, where they listened to Korean women and shared experiences of mobilizing women to end conflict.

She is part of the Patriotic Millionaires, a group of wealthy people who support hiking taxes on the rich. They sent a clear demand for higher tax rates at the World Economic Forum in Davos in January 2020.

In June 2021, Disney published an opinion piece in The Atlantic criticising practices by wealthy individuals who reduce their tax burden and protect their wealth across generations through practices such as "offsetting income with losses in unrelated businesses; structuring assets to grow rather than generate income, then borrowing against those growing assets for cash needs; and deducting interest payments and state taxes from taxable income".

=== Criticism of The Walt Disney Company ===
On April 21, 2019, Disney, through several tweets, criticized Disney CEO Bob Iger's compensation. In 2018, Iger earned a $66 million package, while in 2019, his compensation package was estimated to be approximately $35 million. One month before this statement, she had claimed that CEOs are generally "paid far too much," saying that "there is nobody on Earth [who is] worth 500 times his median workers' pay." On April 22, Disney responded in a statement that the company has made "historic investments" in its workers' pay and benefits, and defended the CEO's compensation, which it said is "90% performance-based." The company stated that Iger "has delivered exceptional value for shareholders." On April 23, The Washington Post published an op-ed by Abigail Disney where she again criticized the "never [before] so profitable" Disney corporation and called for pay equity reform.

In July 2019, Abigail Disney criticized working conditions at Disneyland after a meeting with employees at their union office. She stated that the Disneyland employees she talked to have to forage for food in other people's garbage.

Again turning to Twitter in 2020, Disney publicly criticized the corporation for furloughing hundreds of thousands of low-paid workers during the coronavirus pandemic.

In May 2020, Disney gave a TED talk in which she criticized the pay rates of employees at Disney theme parks. Disney said that when she was growing up, a custodian at Disneyland could make enough money to feed a family, own a modest home, and access decent health care. Today, "three out of four of the people who smile when you walk in, who help you comfort that crying baby, who maybe help you have the best vacation you ever have, can't consistently put food on the table." She added, "Disney has turned a pretty profit on the idea that families are a kind of magic, that love is important, that imaginations matter. That's why it turns your stomach a little bit when I tell you that Cinderella might be sleeping in her car."

In 2022, Disney joined current and past Disney employees in criticizing Bob Chapek for refusing to make a statement concerning Florida House Bill 1557, which is officially named the Parental Rights in Education Bill and was passed in February of that same year. The law prohibits discussion of sexual orientation and gender identity in schools prior to 4th grade.

== Personal life ==
Disney married Pierre Norman Hauser in 1988. She lives in New York City and has four children.

As of 2019, Abigail Disney's net worth was approximately $120 million.

A member of and donor to the Democratic Party, Disney stated in July 2024 that she would not continue to contribute to the party until Joe Biden withdrew from the 2024 United States presidential election.

== Filmography ==
=== Film ===
Year	Title	Notes
2008	Pray the Devil Back to Hell	Executive producer
2009	Sergio	Co-executive producer
2009	Children of Invention	Executive producer
2009	Playground	Executive producer
2010	Family Affair	Executive producer
2010	Secrets of the Tribe	Executive producer
2010	Sons of Perdition	Executive producer
2010	!Women Art Revolution	Executive producer
2010	Lost Bohemia	Executive producer
2011	Return	Executive producer
2011	Hell and Back Again	Executive producer
2011	Sun Come Up	Executive producer
2011	Mothers of Bedford	Executive producer
2011	Lemon	Executive producer
2012	The Queen of Versailles	Executive producer
2012	The Invisible War	Executive producer
2012	This Is How I Roll	Executive producer
2012	Sexy Baby	Executive producer
2012	The Iran Job	Executive producer
2012	Alias Ruby Blade	Executive producer
2013	Open Heart	Executive producer
2013	Citizen Koch	Executive producer
2013	Small Small Thing	Executive producer
2013	The Only Real Game	Executive producer
2013	Hateship, Loveship	Executive producer
2013	Seeds of Time	Executive producer
2014	Land Ho!	Co-executive producer
2014	Food Chains	Executive producer
2014	Vessel	Executive producer
2014	1971	Executive producer
2014	Out in the Night	Executive producer
2014	She's Beautiful When She's Angry	Executive producer
2015	Hot Girls Wanted	Executive producer
2015	The Mask You Live In	Executive producer
2015	The Invitation	Co-executive producer
2015	From This Day Forward	Executive producer
2015	Tocando la Luz	Executive producer
2015	Drawing the Tiger	Executive producer
2015	The Armor of Light	Director, writer, executive producer
2015	The Trials of Spring	Executive producer
2015	The Babushkas of Chernobyl	Executive producer
2015	Buffalo Returns	Executive producer
2016	Lovesong	Co-executive producer
2016	Cameraperson	Executive producer
2016	Split	Executive producer
2016	Shadow World	Executive producer
2016	The Boy Who Cried Fish	Executive producer
2016	Girl Unbound: The War to Be Her	Executive producer
2017	Bending the Arc	Co-executive producer
2017	Love the Sinner	Executive producer
2017	When God Sleeps	Executive producer
2017	Joy Joy Nails	Executive producer
2017	Birds Like Us	Executive producer
2017	Liyana	Executive producer
2017	Wave Goodbye to Dinosaurs	Executive producer
2017	Naila and the Uprising	Executive producer
2017	62 Days	Executive producer
2018	The Tale	Executive producer
2018	The Long Dumb Road	Co-executive producer
2018	Call Her Ganda	Executive producer
2018	Roll Red Roll	Executive producer
2018	Netizens	Executive producer
2018	The Way Madness Lies	Executive producer
2018	Grit	Executive producer
2018	Be Natural: The Untold Story of Alice Guy-Blaché	Executive producer
2018	Same God	Executive producer
2018	Afterward	Executive producer
2019	American Woman	Executive producer
2019	Cooked: Survival by Zip Code	Executive producer
2019	The Assistant	Executive producer
2020	On the Record	Executive producer
2020	Disclosure: Trans Lives on Screen	Executive producer
2020	Mayor	Executive producer
2020	Love & Stuff	Contributing producer
2020	The 8th	Executive producer
2020	For the Love of Rutland	Executive producer
2020	Holler	Executive producer
2020	Missing in Brooks County	Executive producer
2021	The People vs. Agent Orange	Executive producer
2021	Rebel Hearts	Executive producer
2021	Women in Blue	Executive producer
2021	United States vs. Reality Winner	Co-executive producer
2021	The First Step	Executive producer
2021	You Resemble Me	Executive producer
2022	The American Dream and Other Fairy Tales	Director, producer

== Awards and recognition ==
=== Awards ===
- The Women's Image Network Awards (2015) – Woman of the Year Honoree
- Global Women's Rights Awards (2009) presented by the Feminist Majority Foundation, with Gini Reticker and Leymah Gbowee
- Auburn Lives of Commitment Award (2009), presented by Auburn Theological Seminary
- 1st Annual Media Awards (2009), presented by Women's Media Center, with Gini Reticker
- Visionary Social Change Award (2011), presented by African Medical and Research Foundation (AMREF)
- Athena Award (2011), presented by Barnard College, the Athena Center for Leadership Studies and Athena Film Festival, with Gini Reticker
- International Advocate for Peace Award (2011), presented by Cardozo Law School's Cardozo Journal of Conflict Resolution
- 2012 Gracie Award for Outstanding Producer-News/Nonfiction for Women, War & Peace (2012), presented by The Gracie Awards
- The James Park Morton Interfaith Award (2012), presented by the Interfaith Center of New York, with Leymah Gbowee
- Morton Deutsch Award for Social Justice (2014), presented by the Morton Deutsch International Center for Cooperation and Conflict Resolution
- Legacy Award (2014), presented by Women for Afghan Women
- Public Health Change Champion Award (2014), presented by The Public Health Institute
- IWMF (International Women's Media Foundation) Courage in Journalism Awards: Leadership Honoree (2015), presented by IWMF
