= Pray the Devil Back to Hell =

2008 documentary film by Gini Reticker

- Theatrical poster
- Directed by: Gini Reticker
- Produced by: Abigail Disney
- Cinematography: Kirsten Johnson
- Edited by: Kate Taverna; Meg Reticker
- Music by: Blake Leyh
- Distributed by: Balcony Releasing (U.S.) ro*co films (international)
- Release dates: April 24, 2008 (Tribeca Film Festival); November 7, 2008 (U.S.)
- Running time: 72 min.
- Country: United States
- Language: English subtitles

Pray the Devil Back to Hell is a 2008 American documentary film directed by Gini Reticker and produced by Abigail Disney. The film premiered at the 2008 Tribeca Film Festival, where it won the award for Best Documentary. The film had its theatrical release in New York City on November 7, 2008. It had cumulative gross worldwide of $90,066.

The film documents a peace movement called Women of Liberia Mass Action for Peace. Organized by social worker Leymah Gbowee, the movement started with praying and singing in a fish market. Leymah Gbowee organized the Christian and Muslim women of Monrovia, Liberia to pray for peace and to organize nonviolent protests. Dressed in white to symbolize peace, and numbering in the thousands, the women became a political force against violence and against their government.

Their movement led to the election of Ellen Johnson Sirleaf in Liberia, the first African nation with a female president. The film has been used as an advocacy tool in post-conflict zones like Sudan, mobilizing African women to petition for peace and security.

== Synopsis ==
A group of ordinary women in Liberia, led by Leymah Gbowee, came together to pray for peace. Armed only with white T-shirts and the courage of their convictions, they demanded a resolution to the country's civil war.

Under Leymah Gbowee's leadership, the women managed to force a meeting with President Charles Taylor and extract a promise from him to attend peace talks in Ghana. Gbowee then led a delegation of Liberian women to Ghana to continue to apply pressure on the warring factions during the peace process. They staged a silent protest outside of the Presidential Palace, Accra, bringing about an agreement during the stalled peace talks.

Asatu Bah Kenneth is featured in the film. She was as of 2011 the Assistant Minister for Administration and Public Safety of the Liberian Ministry of Justice. At the time, she was the president of the Liberia Female Law Enforcement Association. Inspired by the work of the Christian women's peace initiative, she formed the Liberian Muslim Women's Organization to work for peace.

Working together, over 3,000 Christian and Muslim women mobilized their efforts, and as a result, the women were able to achieve peace in Liberia after a 14-year civil war and helped bring to power the country's first female head of state.

== Title ==
The title of the film is drawn from Gbowee's statement about Taylor and the rebels. Both sides were supposedly religious. The rebels frequented mosques, while Taylor claimed to be a devout Christian who, according to Gbowee, could “pray the devil out of Hell.” It was therefore the responsibility of the women in this inter-faith coalition to pray the devil (of war) right back to Hell.

== Cast ==
In alphabetical order

- Janet Johnson Bryant, as herself
- Etweda Cooper, as herself
- Vaiba Kebeh Flomo, as herself
- Leymah Gbowee, as herself
- Asatu Bah Kenneth, as herself
- Etty Weah, as herself

== Awards ==
- 2008 Tribeca Film Festival — Best Documentary
- 2008 Jackson Hole Film Festival — Cowboy Award Winner — Audience Choice Award
- 2008 Silverdocs — Witness Award
- 2008 Traverse City Film Festival — Special Jury Prize for Non-Fiction Filmmaking
- 2008 Heartland Film Festival — Crystal Heart Award for Best Documentary Feature
- 2008 St. Louis International Film Festival — Best Documentary in the Interfaith Category
- 2008 My Media Award from the My Hero Festival
- 2009 Tri Continental Film Festival — Jury Award for Best Film
- 2009 Palm Springs International Film Festival — One of the Best of the Fest Selections
- 2009 Santa Barbara International Film Festival — Social Justice Award for Documentary Film
- 2009 Cinema for Peace — The Cinema for Peace Award for Justice
- 2009 One World International Human Rights Festival, Prague — Rudolf Vrba Award in the Right to Know Competition
- 2009 Women's Film Festival, Brattleboro, VT — Best of Fest
- 2009 Wilbur Award — Film Documentary for 2009
- 2009 Movies that Matter Festival — Golden Butterfly
- 2009 I Will Tell Film Festival — Ndinadsawapanga Award
- 2009 Buffalo International Film Festival — Audience Award: Best Documentary

== Women of Liberia ==
Women of Liberia Mass Action for Peace

As a result of the First Liberian Civil War from 1989 until 1996 and Second Liberian Civil War from 1999 until 2003, and during post-conflict periods, Liberian women were displaced and faced the death of family members, sexual violence, and challenging economic and social environments. The recovery effort has been led by Liberian women against sexual violence with an all-female United Nations peacekeeping force, trained in sophisticated combat tactics and weaponry, crowd and mob control, and counter-insurgency. In 2009, women made up 15 percent of Liberia's national police force.

== Notes ==
- On June 19, 2009, the film was featured on PBS on Bill Moyers Journal
- Leymah Roberta Gbowee is the executive director of the Women Peace and Security Network Africa, based in Accra, Ghana.
- In 2007, Leymah Gbowee completed a master's degree in conflict transformation at Eastern Mennonite University.
- Leymah Gbowee was named one of "21 Leaders for the 21st Century". In 2009, she and the Women of Liberia were honored with the JFK Profile in Courage Award from the John F. Kennedy Library Foundation.
- Leymah Gbowee along with Ellen Johnson Sirleaf and Tawakkul Karman were awarded the 2011 Nobel Peace Prize "for their non-violent struggle for the safety of women and for women's rights to full participation in peace-building work."

== See also ==
- Women of Liberia Mass Action for Peace
- Ellen Johnson Sirleaf
- Comfort Freeman

General:

- Gender inequality in Liberia
