= Grace Minor =

Liberian politician (born 1942)

Grace Beatrice Minor (born May 31, 1942) is an Americo-Liberian politician who served as the first female President Pro Tempore of the Senate from 2002 to 2003. She was senator for Montserrado County. Minor was a close ally of president Charles Taylor.

== Career ==
In 1976, Minor was commissioner of oldest Congotown. In 1980, she was chosen to represent Congotown in the forthcoming elections prior to the coup.

Minor was a top aide and close confidante to Taylor when he was head of the General Services Agency, from which he was accused by Samuel Doe of embezzling almost a million US dollars. After he escaped from prison in the United States in 1985, she relocated back to Liberia to support him in founding the National Patriotic Front of Liberia and in financing the civil war. She opened a Swiss bank account for him in 1993. She was regarded as second in Taylor's hierarchy, and as his political and business partner, she was considered the "power behind the throne." Minor was the proponent of the "selective elimination" of the indigenous Liberian leaders in the NPFL, a practice which was so prevalent that in 1992 the Economic Community of West African States accused the NPFL of war crimes.

After the founding of the National Patriotic Party and Taylor's success in the 1997 presidential election, Minor was appointed to the Senate, the only female in the government. Following the death of incumbent Keikura B. Kpoto, she was elected President of the Senate in October 2002, the first woman to hold the post. She purchased a house and consultancy firm in Osu, Accra which was managed by her sister. Her son-in-law, Monie Captan, was appointed Foreign Minister. In 2001, she was placed on a United Nations Security Council list of 120 political leaders who were banned from travel outside of Liberia.

On August 25, 2004, the United Nations Security Council added Minor's name to its "Assets Freeze List" under Resolution 1521 due to her ongoing ties with Taylor. Minor handled Taylor's investments at least until 2005, while he was in exile, helping him "recruit couriers, coordinate their movements, and handle the money coming and going from Calabar." However, Leymah Gbowee says that Minor "quietly" gave significant amounts from her personal wealth to fund the Women of Liberia Mass Action for Peace. Minor's name was removed from both UN lists on November 28, 2007. In 2009, the Truth and Reconciliation Commission recommended that Minor, along with a number of others, be barred from holding political office in the new republic for thirty years. The ban was overturned in 2011 by the Supreme Court.

In 2014, Minor was declared "wanted" by the Civil Law Court of Liberia over the demolition of properties resulting in the displacement of 250 families in Congo Town. It was alleged she sold the land to the National Oil Company, which she denied.
