= Port Cresson massacre =

Date	June 10, 1835
Location	Liberia

Belligerents
American slaves and descendants of American slaves	Bassa forces

Commanders and leaders
	King Joe

Casualties and losses
20	

The Port Cresson massacre was a lopsided battle that occurred on June 10, 1835, in the territory of modern-day Liberia between American-born Liberian settlers, many descendants of American slaves, on the one hand and Bassa forces on the other. After the massacre American forces retaliated and routed the Bassa, compelling them to terms for peace.

== Background ==
Port Cresson was a settlement established in near Liberia, in West Africa, in 1834 at the behest of the Pennsylvania branch of the American Colonization Society for purposes of the "repatriation" of freed slaves, and the descendants of slaves, to Africa. At the time of the massacre, it was populated by approximately 130 African-Americans, as well as one White representative of the Pennsylvania society, Edward Hankinson.

According to R. McDowell, a physician visiting Edina at the time of attack, local slave traders decided they did not want to do business so close to a repatriation settlement and had informed the local Bassa chief, King Joe, that they intended to move their business elsewhere. An "exasperated" King Joe—who was equipped with arms provided by American and European slavers—pledged to drive the settlers out.

== Massacre ==
On June 10, 1835, Port Cresson was attacked by the forces of King Joe. As the settlers were pacifist Quakers, they lacked arms or any other means with which to defend themselves. Roughly twenty of the Port Cresson settlers were killed outright by King Joe's men, with the remainder managing to flee the bloodshed and escape to the armed settlement of Monrovia, where Hankinson appealed for aid. Meanwhile, King Joe continued on to attack nearby Edina; however, a second indigenous leader, King Bob, intervened to defend the Edina settlement, and Joe was forced to withdraw.

== Aftermath ==
On learning of the massacre at Port Cresson, Elijah Johnson, a veteran of the War of 1812, assembled a company of 120 armed volunteers and set out on a punitive expedition to engage King Joe. The Monrovia government routed the opposing forces. A peace accord was signed on November 6, 1835. In it, Joe promised to pay indemnifications, stop participating in the slave trade, and submit all territorial disputes to settler courts for adjudication.

Hankinson, traumatized by the attack, refused to return to the devastated Port Cresson settlement. The demonstration of the military power of the Monrovian forces against Joe helped cement the central importance of Liberia among the disparate repatriation colonies being established in west Africa.
