= Iowa Citizens for Community Improvement =

- Formation: 1975
- Type: Community organization
- Headquarters: Des Moines, Iowa
- Region served: Iowa
- Members: 3,700 members
- Affiliations: National People's Action
- Website: iowacci.org

Iowa Citizens for Community Improvement (CCI, Iowa CCI, occasionally ICCI) is a membership-based grassroots organization dedicated to community organizing in the state of Iowa.

CCI is a 501(c)(3) non-profit, affiliated with sister 501(c)(4) organization Iowa Citizens for Community Improvement Action Fund.

== History ==
CCI was formed in 1975 by a group of ministers in Waterloo, Iowa who felt Iowa needed an organization to fight for social justice issues. CCI began by focusing mainly on neighborhood-level organizing, but soon grew into a statewide organization. Early issues addressed by CCI members included misuse of public funds, slum landlords, and the practice of redlining. Notable victories from the 1970s included the establishment of the Peoples Community Health Clinic in Waterloo, passage of the statewide Iowa Uniform Residential Landlord and Tenant Act, and the state Neighborhood Revitalization Law.

As Iowans faced the Midwest farm crisis of the 1980s, CCI members added rural issues to their urban organizing. CCI members stopped farm foreclosures, renegotiated mortgages, and helped family farmers gain access to much-needed credit. In the 1990s, as agriculture began to be ever more tightly controlled by corporate interests with the appearance of factory farms and the mandatory pork checkoff, CCI members led efforts to block these actions.

CCI made national news in August 2011 when members questioned Republican presidential candidate Mitt Romney at a soapbox appearance at the Iowa State Fair, leading Romney to respond, "Corporations are people, my friend." Video footage of this remark was picked up by media outlets as an indication that Romney was out of touch with ordinary Americans.

== Campaigns ==
CCI members continue to organize against factory farms, work to regulate payday lending, institute public campaign financing in the form of Voter-Owned Iowa Clean Elections (VOICE), and defend the social safety net, among other campaigns to fight corporate power. Many CCI members are members of Iowa's growing Latino community. CCI issues in this community include ending widespread wage theft and enacting immigration reform.

As of 2015 CCI has been organizing around four issues: Farming & Environment, Immigrant rights, Fair Economy and Clean Elections.

ICCI exposed the state’s failure to protect water quality. It fought for a workplan for Clean Water Act enforcement by suing EPA to bring Iowa Department of Natural Resources's Concentrated Animal Feeding Operations (CAFO) program into compliance with the Clean Water Act. After an EPA field investigation of the DNR in 2012, DNR "promised to enforce the Clean Water Act, yet did not sign a workplan in 2012, and only signed a weakened plan on September 11, 2013. In the year since, the Iowa DNR did not issue any Clean Water Act permits to agricultural polluters. ICCI has pointed out that DNR has fined responsible parties of only 11 of the 49 manure spills, but has not issued administrative orders nor collected fines issued.

== Recognition ==
John Nichols of The Nation named CCI the "most valuable grassroots advocacy group" of 2009.

CCI was featured on the final episode of Bill Moyers Journal, where the group was described as "advocates for the people."
