= Ebenezer Norman =

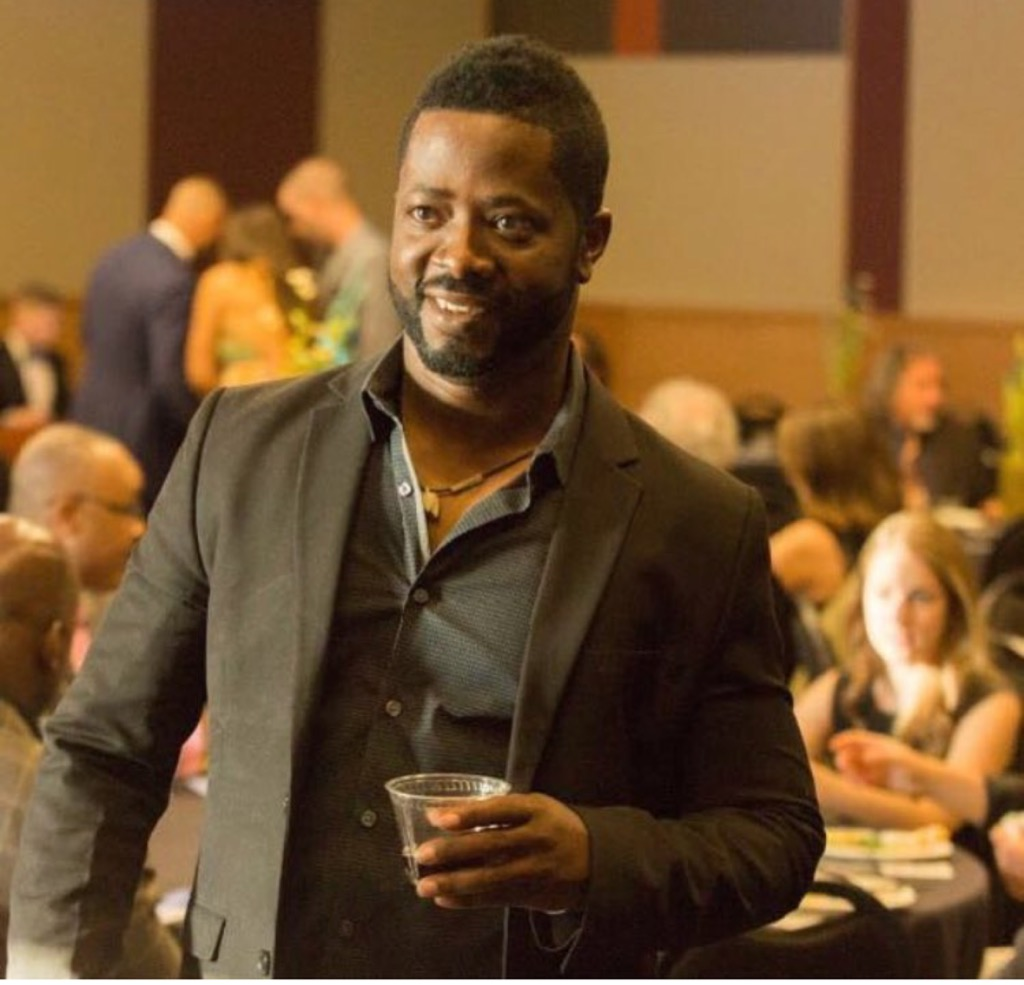
- Ebenezer Norman at fundraising event in 2018
- Born: 10 June 1981 (age 45); Monrovia, Liberia
- Education: Leading economic growth, Harvard University, BA in Organization Development, Regis University; Master of Development Practice, Regis University
- Occupation: Activist]
- Known for: Humanitarian activism, female education activism, Popular education activism

Ebenezer Norman is a Liberian philanthropist, humanitarian, public speaker, and founder of the education non-profit A New Dimension of Hope (NDHope). He is involved in humanitarian efforts in Liberia and throughout West Africa, notably for efforts to build schools in attenuated or war-torn communities after the Second Liberian Civil War in 2003 and the Ebola virus epidemic in Liberia in 2015.

== Early life ==
Norman was born in Monrovia, Liberia, in 1981 and moved to the United States as a teenager on a student visa. In the aftermath of the Second Liberian Civil War, Norman returned to Liberia to assist with peacekeeping and humanitarian efforts. It was at this time he first connected with Nobel Peace Prize Laureate Leymah Gbowee. In 2010, while on a tour of the school system in Monrovia, Norman was inspired to develop an organization that would construct and manage school systems in Liberia that could be held to the same academic standards as the school systems in the United States.

On this basis, Norman was granted an opportunity to study Non-profit Organization Development at Regis University and founded the organization NDHope while an undergrad at the university. He self-funded NDHope in its early stages by working part-time as an HR Rep at Dish Network and Comcast Cable. It was during this period that Norman garnered funding in order to build his first school in Troyah Town, Liberia.

== Career ==
=== New Dimension of Hope ===
While still struggling to fundraise on behalf of NDHope, Norman managed to gather the funding to construct his first school through his personal savings and bank loans while living in Denver, Colorado. He managed the resources and labor of the school's construction from the United States, traveling a few times to Liberia to oversee it. After the initial construction of this first school, the outbreak of Ebola in the region forced all educational buildings in the area to close. By the time the virus had subsided, the school had been largely abandoned and decrepit.

The closure of this first school due to the Ebola outbreak was the catalyst for an expanded fundraising effort. Norman brought on a new team of media strategists and fundraisers to increase visibility and showcase the work he was doing in Liberia. The new strategy included a crowd-funding campaign in which Leymah Gbowee offered to write handwritten letters to the highest donors and was a success. The school re-opened in 2015 and Gbowee cut the ribbon at the ceremony.

=== School's destruction ===
Less than a year after the inaugural school's construction, internal real estate issues between the government of Liberia and the University of Liberia campus near the site of the school resulted in the school's destruction. This resulted in a public outcry on behalf of Norman and NDHope. In the two years following the incident, both Leymah Gbowee and Dr. Jerry Brown, one of Time magazine's 2014 People of the Year, attended fundraisers on behalf of NDHope.

In 2019, the school was rebuilt in a neighboring village. The new school, according to a Facebook post by the organization, is more than three times as big as the original school and includes updated facilities and technology.

Currently, plans for a third school are underway.

=== Awards ===
Ebenezer Norman is a recently elected Global Goodwill Ambassador (GGA). In 2013, he was a nominee of the World of Children award. He was also a recipient of the Leaders Overcoming Obstacles to Peace or LOOP Award.

== Personal life ==
Norman currently lives in Denver Colorado. Norman has served as a leader for various other organizations, including the "Father's Project".
