= Edina, Liberia =

City in Grand Bassa County, Liberia

Edina
- City
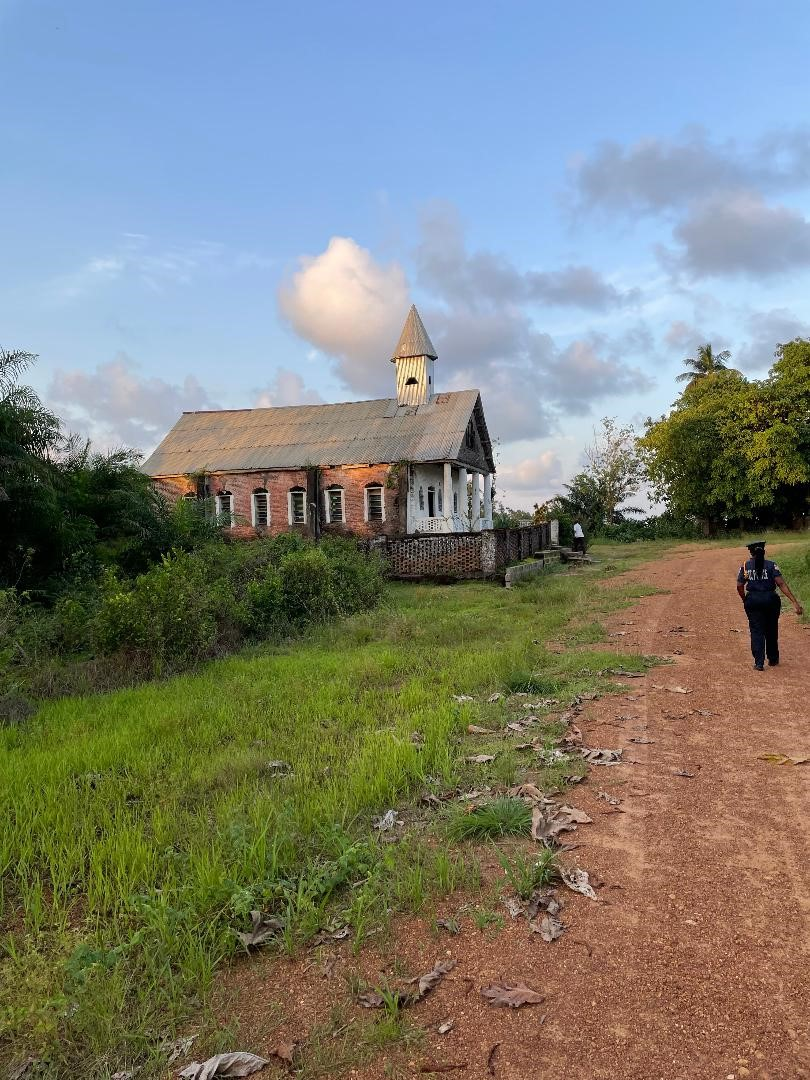
- The 19th-century First Baptist Church of Edina

- Location in Liberia
- Coordinates: 05°55′30″N 10°04′38″W
- Country: Liberia
- County: Grand Bassa County
- District: District 1
- Settled: 1832

Government
  - Mayor: Samuel A.L. Johnson
- Elevation: 0 m (0 ft)
- Time zone: UTC+0 (GMT)

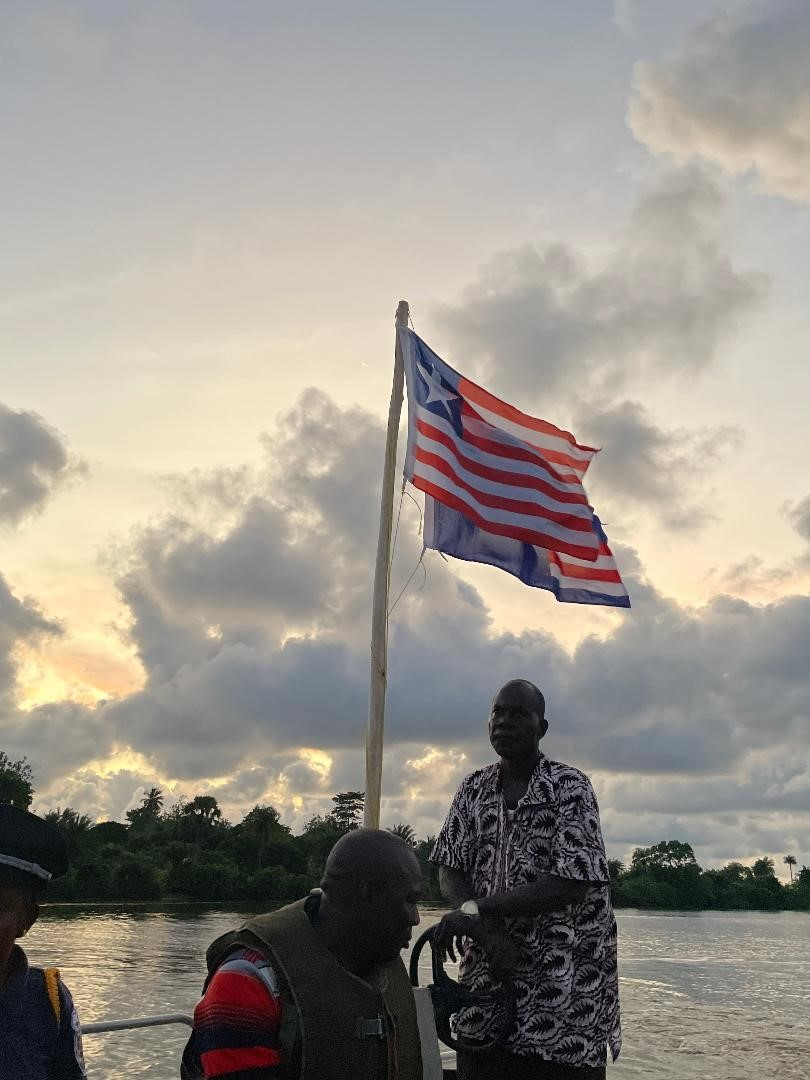
Water transport between Edina and Buchanan.

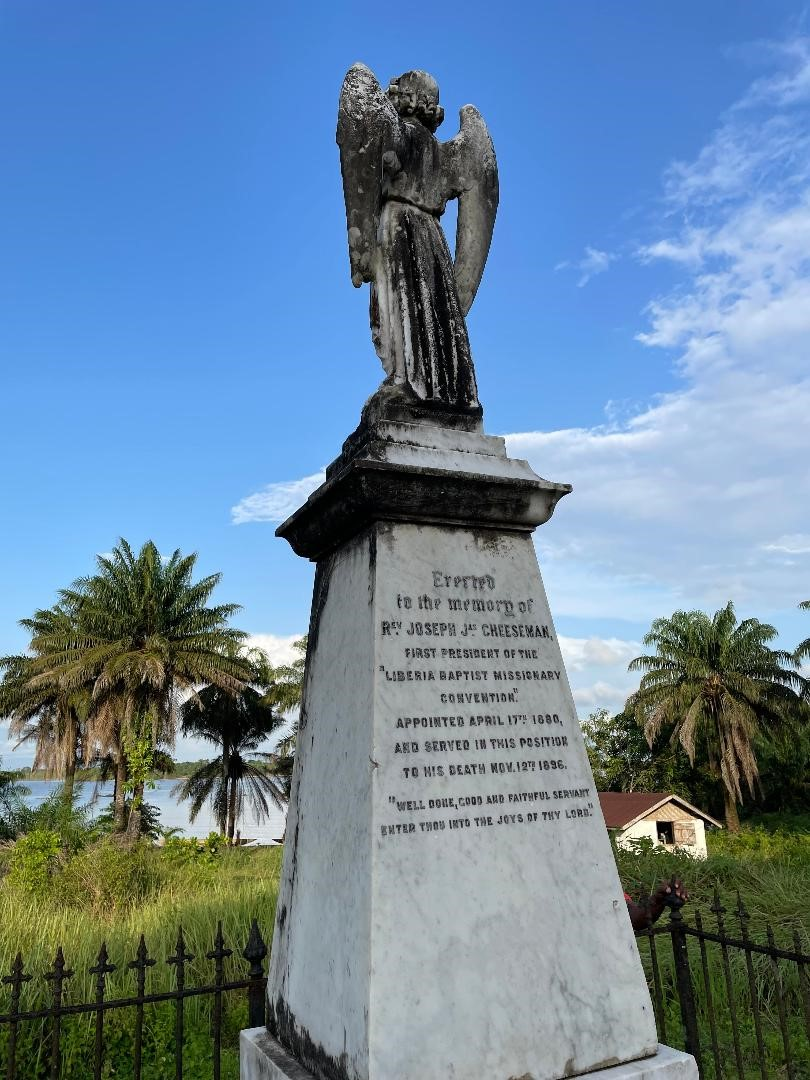
Monument honoring President Cheeseman, a native of Edina.

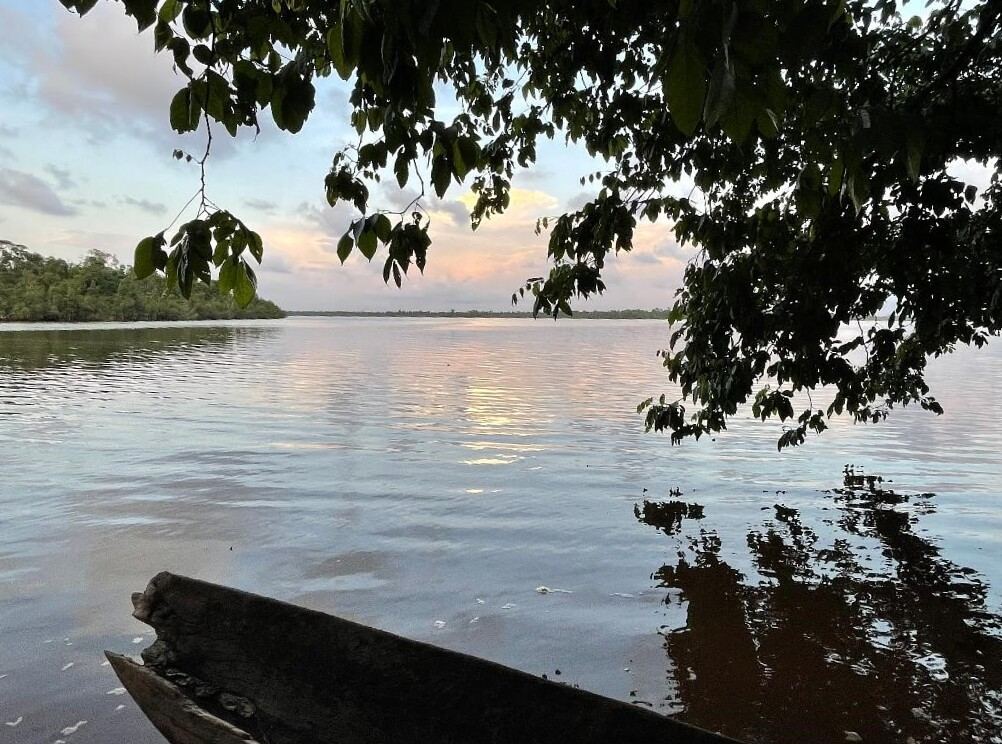
First settlers to Edina would have landed here.

Edina is a city in District 1 of Grand Bassa County, Liberia. Located on the central portion of the Atlantic Coast of Liberia on the north shore of the mouth of the St. John River, it is about 3.5 miles (5.6 km) north of Grand Bassa's capital of Buchanan. Settled in 1832, the city has had Lady Benson as its mayor since 2024. The community is named after Edinburgh, Scotland, which provided monetary support for the foundation of the settlement.

== History ==
Edina was founded as a colony of the American Colonization Society in 1832. Edina colony was later given to the United Colonization Societies of New York and Pennsylvania and became part of the Bassa Cove colony in 1837. On October 22, 1836, a school was opened and in December 1837, a church was founded in the colony. A second church opened in late 1839 while the Baptists started a mission at Edina.

Edina is listed as one of the original settlements comprising the Commonwealth of Liberia in the 1839 Constitution, which was drafted by the American Colonization Society.

Edina was the birthplace of the 12th President of Liberia, Joseph James Cheeseman. Cheeseman and his wife are buried in Edina next to their mansion, which is now in ruins and overgrown with vegetation. One of the earliest settlers of Edina was Charles R.H. Johnson, a son of Elijah Johnson who was one of the pioneers that played significant roles in establishing Liberia.

In 2002, an outbreak of diarrhea killed six people in and around the city. Steel manufacturer Mittal began subsidising medical care in the city in 2007.

The peace activist Etweda Cooper served as mayor from 2010 to 2012.

== Details ==
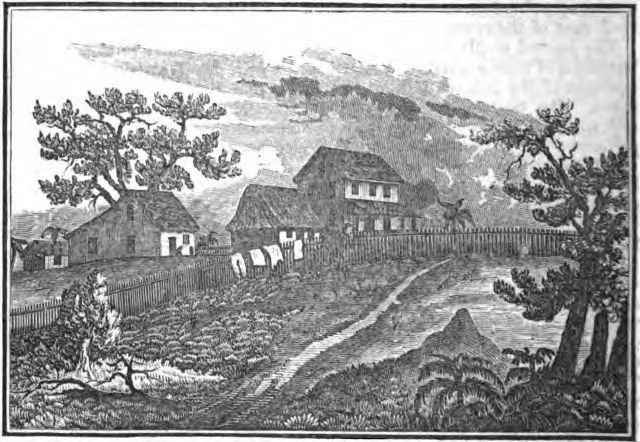
Baptist Mission circa 1840

Edina is in District 1 of Grand Bassa County along the St. John River. It is near the mouth of the river, about 3.5 miles (5.6 km) north of Buchanan with Paynesberry and Tuo Town the next closest communities. Lying along the Atlantic coast in the central part of Liberian coastline, about 40 miles south of the capital of Monrovia, it is inhabited by many fishermen. Situated at sea level, the greater Edina area has a population of 15,628.

Edina Public Health Center, a government run medical clinic, is located in the city. The Liberian government believes Edina lies at the southern end of possible off-shore oil deposits. It is among the oldest communities in the county.

Historical sites include the Palladian-style mansion of Joseph James Cheeseman and the 19th-century First Baptist Church.

== See also ==
- Port Cresson massacre
