= Saint John River (Liberia) =

River in West Africa

Coordinates: 5°55′30″N 10°04′15″W

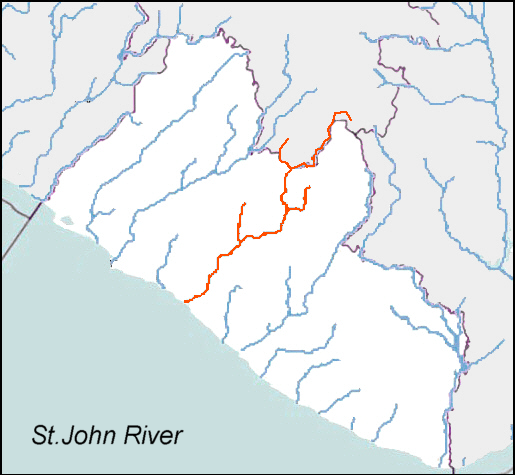
- Map of the river

Location
- Countries: Guinea; Liberia

Physical characteristics
- Source
  - location: Guinea Highlands
- Mouth
  - location: North Atlantic Ocean
  - elevation: 0 m (0 ft) above sea level
- Length: 282 km (175 mi)
- Basin size: 16,157 km^{2} (6,238 sq mi)
- Discharge
  - location: Near mouth
  - average: (Period: 1979–2015) 27.27 km^{3}/a (864 m^{3}/s)
- Discharge
  - location: Baila
  - average: 136.06 m^{3}/s (4,805 cu ft/s)

The Saint John River is one of the six main rivers in the West African nation of Liberia. With its headwaters in neighboring Guinea, the river flows generally southwest through Liberia and empties into the Atlantic Ocean at Bassa Cove near Edina in Grand Bassa County. The 282 km (175 mi) river has a drainage basin covering 16,157 km^{2} (6,238 sq mi).

== Course ==
The headwaters of the river are in the Nimba Range of the Guinea Highlands in the country of Guinea and flow south towards the border with Liberia. Near Yalata, Guinea it begins to form the border between Guinea and Bong County in Liberia. Flowing generally south, it forms the international boundary for around 9.6 km (6 miles). At Niatande, Liberia, it meets the Mani River and enters Liberia, forming the boundary between Bong and Nimba counties. The river then flows to the southwest for approximately 15 miles (24 km) before turning to the southeast for a 12-mile (19 km) stretch. Near Zahn it takes the smaller Yah river, and turns southwest again.

After about 15 miles (24 km) it begins to form the boundary between Bong and Grand Bassa counties and turns west for about 16 km (10 miles). The river then continues to the southwest, and after approximately 30 miles (48 km) it enters Grand Bassa County. After around 8 miles (13 km) it turns south for eight miles (13 km) and then flows back to the southwest for approximately 16 km (10 miles). Near Shoigabli it turns due south for about 9 miles (14 km) where it passes Mount Finley and turns more westerly and flows generally southwest for another 14.5 km (9 miles). Between Zoblum and Alfabli the Saint John widens and flows to the northwest for around 3 miles (4.8 km) before heading west for a mile to Hartford. The river then dives to the southwest for its final 10.5 km (6.5 miles). Here it receives the Mechlin and Benson rivers as it empties into the Atlantic Ocean near Edina and Buchanan.

== Details ==
The river's drainage basin covers 14,762 square kilometres (5,700 sq mi) over both Liberia and Guinea. At 175 miles (282 km) in length, it is one of the six main or major rivers of Liberia. There are only 16 rivers in the country total. The average annual discharge of the St. John is 136.06 m^{3}/s (4,805 cu ft/s) as measured at the inland station of Baila. During the wet season in October, flows average 233.49 m^{3}/s (8,246 cu ft/s), while in February during the dry season the flows average 18.95 m^{3}/s (669 cu ft/s) at the same location.

The mouth of the river is approximately 60 miles (97 km) south and east of the Saint Paul River’s mouth near Monrovia. Flowing generally southwest from its source to the ocean it contains occasional rapids and a waterfall. Near the ocean the river reaches its widest point of about 1 mile (1.6 km) across and is the location of Factory Island, the largest of the many islands in the river. The river received its name from Portuguese explorers in the 15th Century who spotted the mouth on St. John's feast day.

=== Aquatic life ===
The Saint John River has a variety of aquatic life in and along the shores over the length to the river. Species include the Slender-snouted Crocodile on inland portions of the waterway. There are at least 65 species of fish in the river, including species of Mastacembelidae, Barbus eburneensis, Chrysichthys johnelsi, Killifish, Electric catfish, Nile perch, and Tilapia among others. Birds also use the riverbanks and islands as nesting grounds, including the Three-cusped Pangolin, Palaearctic, Sandpipers, Greenshanks, Little Ringed Plover, and Water Chevrotain in the Kpatawee Wetlands area in Bong County.
