= Leymah Gbowee =

Liberian peace activist (born 1972)

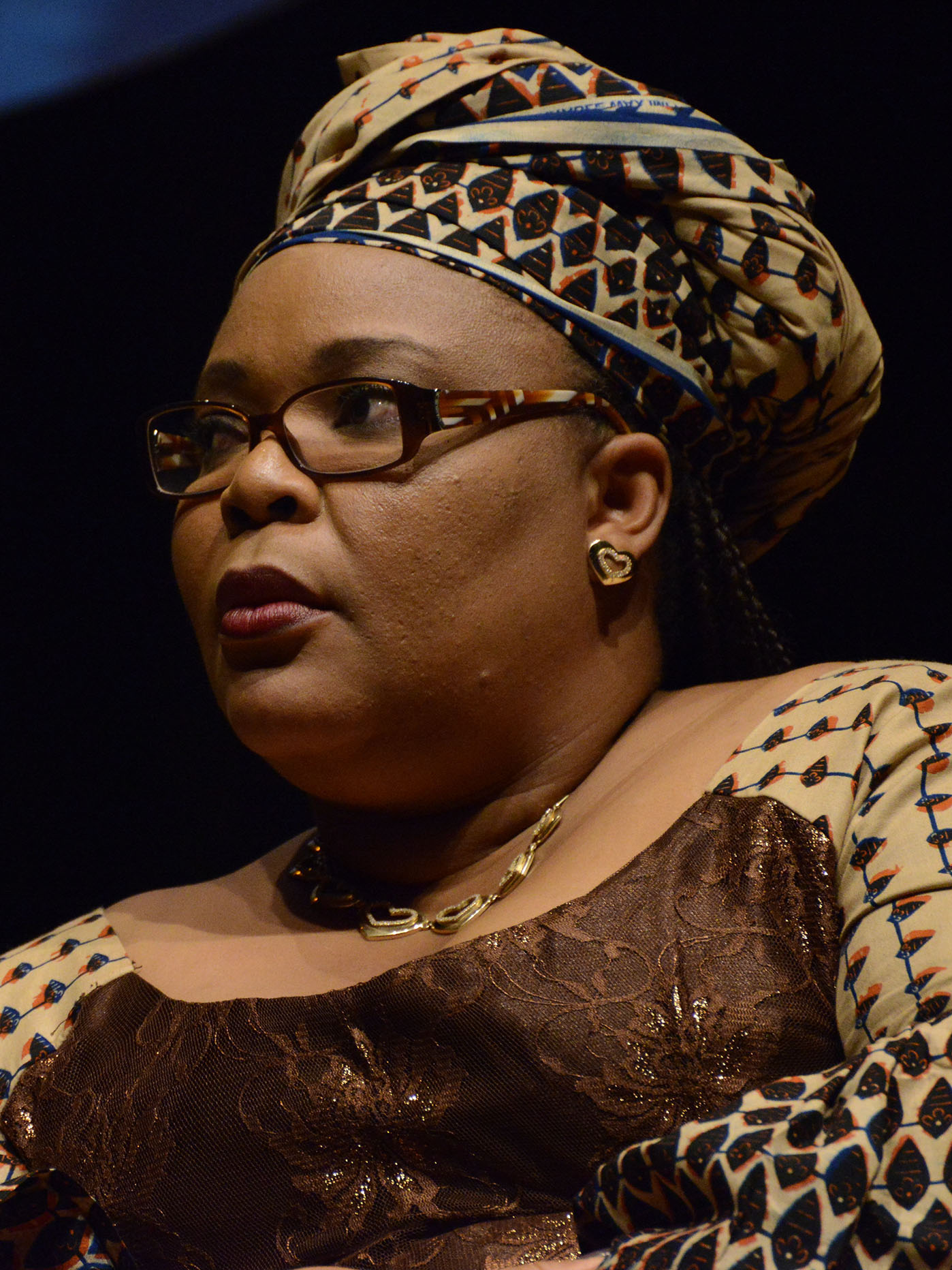
- Gbowee in 2013
- Born: Leymah Roberta Gbowee; 1 February 1972 (age 54); Central Liberia
- Education: Mother Patern College of Health Sciences (AA); Eastern Mennonite University (MA)
- Occupation: Peace activist
- Known for: Women of Liberia Mass Action for Peace and Pray the Devil Back to Hell
- Awards: Nobel Peace Prize (2011)

Leymah Roberta Gbowee (born 1 February 1972) is a Liberian peace activist responsible for leading a women's non-violent peace movement, Women of Liberia Mass Action for Peace that helped bring an end to the Second Liberian Civil War in 2003. Her efforts to end the war, along with her collaborator Ellen Johnson Sirleaf, helped usher in a period of peace and enabled a free election in 2005 that Sirleaf won. Gbowee and Sirleaf, along with Tawakkul Karman, were awarded the 2011 Nobel Peace Prize "for their non-violent struggle for the safety of women and for women's rights to full participation in peace-building work."

== Early life ==
Leymah Gbowee was born in central Liberia on 1 February 1972. At the age of 17, she was living with her parents and two of her three sisters in Monrovia while planning on continuing her education, when the First Liberian Civil War erupted in 1989, throwing the country into chaos until 1996. "As the war subsided she learned about a program run by UNICEF,... training people to be social workers who would then counsel those traumatized by war," wrote Gbowee in her 2011 memoir, Mighty Be Our Powers. She did a three-month training, which led her to be aware of her own abuse at the hands of the father of her two young children, son Joshua "Nuku" and daughter Amber. Searching for peace and sustenance for her family, Gbowee followed her partner, called Daniel in her memoir, to Ghana where she and her growing family (her second son, Arthur, was born) lived as virtually homeless refugees and almost starved. She fled with her three children, riding a bus on credit for over a week "because I didn't have a cent," back to the chaos of Liberia, where her parents and other family members still lived.

In 1998, in an effort to gain admission to an associate of arts degree program in social work at Mother Patern College of Health Sciences, Gbowee became a volunteer within a program of the Lutheran Church in Liberia operating out of St. Peter's Lutheran Church in Monrovia, where her mother was a women's leader and Gbowee had passed her teenage years. It was called the Trauma Healing and Reconciliation Program (THRP), and it marked the beginning of Gbowee's journey toward being a peace activist:

The THRP's offices were new, but the program had a history. Liberia's churches had been active in peace efforts ever since the civil war started, and in 1991, Lutheran pastors, lay leaders, teachers and health workers joined with the Christian Health Association of Liberia to try to repair the psychic and social damage left by the war. Gbowee studied and worked her way toward her associate of art degree, conferred in 2001, while applying her training in trauma healing and reconciliation to try to rehabilitate some of the ex-child soldiers of Charles Taylor's army. Surrounded by the images of war, she realized that "if any changes were to be made in society it had to be by the mothers". Gbowee gave birth to a second daughter Nicole "Pudu", making her the mother of four, as she engaged in the next chapter of her life's journey – rallying the women of Liberia to stop the violence that was destroying their children.

== Education and training ==
Gbowee obtained an Associate of Arts degree in social work (2001) from Mother Patern College of Health Sciences in Monrovia, Liberia, and subsequently graduated with a Master of Arts in Conflict Transformation (2007) from Eastern Mennonite University in Harrisonburg, Virginia. She also received a certificate in Conflict Prevention and Peacebuilding Training from the United Nations Institute for Training, the Healing Victims of War Trauma Center in Cameroon, and Non-Violent Peace Education in Liberia.

== Career ==
Gbowee is the founder and president of Gbowee Peace Foundation Africa, founded in 2012 and based in Monrovia, which provides educational and leadership opportunities to girls, women and the youth in Liberia.

In addition, Gbowee is the former executive director of the Women Peace and Security Network Africa, based in Accra, Ghana, which builds relationships across the West African sub-region in support of women's capacity to prevent, avert, and end conflicts. She is a founding member and former coordinator of the Women in Peacebuilding Program/West African Network for Peacebuilding (WIPNET/WANEP). She also served as the commissioner-designate for the Liberia Truth and Reconciliation Commission. For the 2013–2015 academic years, she was a Distinguished Fellow in Social Justice at Barnard College of Columbia University.

From 2012 to 2014, Gbowee served on the High-Level Task Force for the International Conference on Population and Development, co-chaired by Joaquim Chissano and Tarja Halonen. In 2013, she became an Oxfam Global Ambassador.

Gbowee speaks internationally to advance women's rights, and peace and security. In 2016, Gbowee spoke at a protest march organized by Women Wage Peace, a political grassroots group working to advance a peace agreement between Israel and Palestine.

Gbowee is also an outspoken supporter of fellow Liberian Ebenezer Norman's non-profit organization A New Dimension of Hope, a foundation which builds schools in Liberia. In May 2015, she wrote personal letters to the contributors of NDhope's crowd-funding campaign on Indiegogo and has spoken at their events.

As of April 2017, Gbowee is also Executive Director of the Women of Peace and Security Program at AC4, Earth Institute, Columbia University.

Gbowee is also a contributor at The Daily Beast.

=== Involvement in trauma healing ===
In the spring of 1999, after Gbowee had been at the Trauma Healing project for a year, her supervisor, Reverend Bartholomew Bioh "BB" Colley, a pastor of the Lutheran Church in Liberia, introduced her to Samuel Gbaydee Doe (no relation to the former Liberian president by the same first and last name), a "passionate and intelligent" Liberian who had just earned a master's degree from a Christian university in the U.S. that specialized in peace-building studies. Doe was the executive director of Africa's first regional peace organization, the West Africa Network for Peacebuilding (WANEP), which he had co-founded in 1998 in Ghana. Encouraged by the Lutheran reverend she calls "BB", Gbowee began reading widely in the field of peacebuilding, notably reading The Politics of Jesus by Mennonite theologian John Howard Yoder, and works by "Martin Luther King Jr. and Gandhi and the Kenyan author and conflict and reconciliation expert Hizkias Assefa."

By late 1999, "WANEP was actively seeking to involve women in its work and I was invited to a conference in Ghana," wrote Gbowee. At a follow-up WANEP conference in October 2000, Gbowee met Thelma Ekiyor of Nigeria, who was "well educated, a lawyer who specialized in alternative dispute resolution." Ekiyor told Gbowee of her idea of approaching WANEP to start a women's organization. "Thelma was a thinker, a visionary, like BB and Sam. But she was a woman, like me."

Within a year, Ekiyor had secured funding from WANEP and had organized the first meeting of the Women in Peacebuilding Network (WIPNET) in Accra, Ghana, which Gbowee attended:

How to describe the excitement of that first meeting...? There were women from Sierra Leone, Guinea, Nigeria, Senegal, Burkina Faso, Togo – almost all the sixteen West African nations. In her quietly brilliant way, Thelma had handwritten an organizer's training manual with exercises that would draw women out, engage them, teach them about conflict and conflict resolution, and even help them understand why they should be involved in addressing these issues at all.

In the sympathetic setting of other women hungry for peace, Gbowee told the painful parts of her life story for the first time, including sleeping on the floor of a hospital corridor with her newborn baby for a week because she had no money to pay the bill and nobody to help her. "No one else in Africa was doing this: focusing only on women and only on building peace." Ekiyor became Gbowee's trainer and friend. She also was the one who announced the launch of WIPNET in Liberia and named Gbowee as coordinator of Liberian Women's Initiative. Gbowee's "peace-church" philosophical orientation likely can be traced to this era – Thelma Ekiyor, Rev. "BB" Colley, Samuel Gbaydee Doe, and Hizkias Assefa are all connected to Eastern Mennonite University in the United States, either as former students or (in Assefa's case) as an ongoing professor.

=== Leading a mass women's movement ===
In the spring of 2002, Gbowee was spending her days employed in trauma-healing work and her evenings as the unpaid leader of WIPNET in Liberia. Her children, now including an adopted daughter named Lucia "Malou" (bringing the number of children to five), were living in Ghana under her sister's care. Falling asleep in the WIPNET office one night, she awoke from a dream where she says God had told her, "Gather the women and pray for peace!" Some friends helped her to understand that the dream was not meant for others, as Gbowee thought; instead, she realized that it was a necessary for her to act upon it herself.

Following a WIPNET training session in Liberia, Gbowee and her allies, including a Mandingo-Muslim woman named Asatu, began by "going to the mosques on Friday at noon after prayers, to the markets on Saturday morning, to two churches every Sunday." Their flyers read: "We are tired! We are tired of our children being killed! We are tired of being abused!! Women, wake up – you have a voice in the peace process!" They also handed out simple drawings explaining their purpose to the many women who couldn't read.

By the summer of 2002, Gbowee was recognized as the spokeswoman and inspirational leader of the Women of Liberia Mass Action for Peace, described as a peace movement that started with local women praying and singing in a fish market. Women would also oppose the war by fasting and going to government buildings to picket. Working across religious and ethnic lines, Gbowee led thousands of Christian and Muslim women to gather in Monrovia for months. They prayed for peace, using Muslim and Christian prayers, and eventually held daily nonviolent demonstrations and sit-ins in defiance of orders from the tyrannical president at that time, Charles Taylor.

They staged protests that included the threat of a curse and a sex strike. Of the strike, Gbowee says, "The [sex] strike lasted, on and off, for a few months. It had little or no practical effect, but it was extremely valuable in getting us media attention." In a highly risky move, the women finally occupied a field that had been used for soccer; it was beside Tubman Boulevard, the route Charles Taylor traveled twice a day, to and from Capitol Hill. To make themselves more recognizable as a group, all of the women wore T-shirts that were white, signifying peace, with the WIPNET logo and white hair ties. Taylor finally granted a hearing for the women on 23 April 2003. With more than 2,000 women amassed outside his executive mansion, Gbowee was the person designated to make their case to him. Gbowee positioned her face to be seen by Taylor but directed her words to Grace Minor, the president of the senate and the only female government official present:

We are tired of war. We are tired of running. We are tired of begging for bulgur wheat. We are tired of our children being raped. We are now taking this stand, to secure the future of our children. Because we believe, as custodians of society, tomorrow our children will ask us, "Mama, what was your role during the crisis?"

In her book, Gbowee reveals that Grace Minor quietly "gave a great deal of her own money... at enormous personal risk" to the women's protest movement. The protesting women extracted a promise from President Charles Taylor to attend peace talks in Ghana to negotiate with the rebels from Liberians United for Reconciliation and Democracy and another newer rebel group, MODEL.

In June 2003, Gbowee led a delegation of Liberian women to Ghana to put pressure on the warring factions during the peace-talk process. At first the women sat in a daily demonstration outside the posh hotels where the negotiators met, pressuring for progress in the talks. When the talks dragged from early June through late July, with no progress made and violence continuing in Liberia, Gbowee led dozens of women, eventually swelling to a couple hundred, inside the hotel, where they simply "dropped down, in front of the glass door that was the main entrance to the meeting room." They held signs that said: "Butchers and murderers of the Liberian people -- STOP!" Gbowee passed a message to the lead mediator, General Abubakar (a former president of Nigeria), that the women would interlock their arms and remain seated in the hallway, holding the delegates "hostage" until a peace agreement was reached. Abubakar, who proved to be sympathetic to the women, announced with some amusement: "The peace hall has been seized by General Leymah and her troops." When the men tried to leave the hall, Leymah and her allies threatened to rip their clothes off: "In Africa, it's a terrible curse to see a married or elderly woman deliberately bare herself." With Abubakar's support, the women remained sitting outside the negotiating room during the following days, ensuring that the "atmosphere at the peace talks changed from circuslike to somber."

The Liberian war ended officially weeks later, with the signing of the Accra Comprehensive Peace Agreement on 18 August 2003. "But what we [women] did marked the beginning of the end."

In addition to helping bring an end to 14 years of warfare in Liberia, this women's movement led to the 2005 election of Ellen Johnson Sirleaf as president of Liberia, the first elected woman leader of a country in Africa. Sirleaf is co-recipient of the 2011 Nobel Peace Prize along with Gbowee and Tawakel Karman. The three were awarded the prize "for their non-violent struggle for the safety of women and for women's rights to full participation in peace-building work." In Sirleaf's re-election campaign of 2011, Gbowee endorsed her.

=== Consolidating the peace ===
Recognizable in their white WIPNET T-shirts, Gbowee and the other Liberian women activists were treated as national heroines by Liberians in the streets for weeks following the signing of the Accra Comprehensive Peace Agreement. Yet Gbowee wrote of their unceasing nervousness about the fragility of the peace they had helped birth:

A war of fourteen years doesn't just go away. In the moments we were calm enough to look around, we had to confront the magnitude of what had happened in Liberia. Two hundred and fifty thousand people were dead, a quarter of them children. One in three were displaced, with 350,000 living in internally displaced persons camps and the rest anywhere they could find shelter. One million people, mostly women and children, were at risk of malnutrition, diarrhea, measles and cholera because of contamination in the wells. More than 75 percent of the country's physical infrastructure, our roads, hospitals and schools, had been destroyed.

Gbowee expressed particular concern for the "psychic damage" borne by Liberians:

A whole generation of young men had no idea who they were without a gun in their hands. Several generations of women were widowed, had been raped, seen their daughters and mothers raped, and their children kill and be killed. Neighbors had turned against neighbors; young people had lost hope, and old people, everything they had painstakingly earned. To a person, we were traumatized.

In an interview for the International Women's Day, Gbowee also expressed:

The Liberian women peace movement demonstrated to the world that grassroots movements are essential to sustaining peace; that women in leadership positions are effective brokers for peace; and the importance of culturally relevant social justice movements. Liberia's experience is a good example to the world that women—especially African women—can be drivers of peace

Amid the destruction and unending needs, Gbowee was appalled by the arrogance, ignorance and overall cultural insensitivity of the United Nations agencies dispatched to help disarm the country, keep the peace, establish procedures for democratic governance, and initiate rebuilding efforts. "People who have lived through a terrible conflict may be hungry and desperate, but they're not stupid (Gbowee's emphasis). They often have very good ideas about how peace can evolve, and they need to be asked." Gbowee advocated for involving Liberian civil society, especially women's organizations, in restoring the country. She grew frustrated with the way the "UN was spending many millions of dollars in Liberia, but most of it was on [their own] staffing resources.... If they had just given some of that money to the local people, it would have made a real difference."

By the late fall and winter of 2003-04, "the world of conflict resolution, peace-building and the global women's movement" was calling Gbowee to write papers, come to conferences and otherwise explain the experience and views of WIPNET. Thelma Ekiyor encouraged Gbowee to overcome her lack of self-esteem among "highly intelligent people who held master's degrees and represented powerful institutions" by reading and studying further to understand the theories circulating in the world of peacebuilding. She read The Peace Book by Louise Diamond, known for advocating multi-track diplomacy, and The Journey Toward Reconciliation and The Little Book of Conflict Transformation, both written by John Paul Lederach, the founding director of the Center for Justice and Peacebuilding at Eastern Mennonite University. She went to a USAID conference in New York, her first trip out of Africa, to a conference in South Africa, and to Switzerland where she dealt with the Nigerian in charge of UN programs in Liberia.

=== Master's degree in peacebuilding ===
In the late spring of 2004, about eight months after the Ghana-Accra Comprehensive Peace Agreement was signed, Gbowee made a decision to take college-level courses in the field in which she had been working: "I'd heard about Eastern Mennonite University (EMU), an American college with a well-known program in peace-building and conflict resolution. It was a Christian school that emphasized community and service; it had a long-standing relationship with WANEP and a history of recruiting Africans to study there." Her first stint at EMU – four weeks at its annual Summer Peacebuilding Institute – were "a transformative time for me."

Gbowee studied with Hizkias Assefa, whose writings she had read five years earlier when she first began working for St. Peter's Lutheran Church on trauma healing. She also studied with Howard Zehr, "who taught me the concept of restorative justice," whereby healing occurred through the joint efforts of victims and offenders to repair the harms done. She thought restorative justice was particularly applicable to Africa: "Restorative justice was...something we could see as ours and not artificially imposed by Westerners. And we needed it, needed that return to tradition. A culture of impunity flourished throughout Africa. People, officials, governments did evil but were never held accountable. More than we needed to punish them, we needed to undo the damage they had done.... When I left EMU, I knew there was more here for me. Somehow I would find a way to come back."

Gbowee returned for a round-table called Strategies for Trauma Healing and Resilience in the summer of 2005 and then enrolled as a residential, full-time master's degree student in "conflict transformation and peacebuilding" at EMU's Center for Justice and Peacebuilding in 2006-07:

At graduate school, I could feel my mind expand, my comprehension deepen. I realized I now could put a formal name, "strategic peacebuilding," to what I'd done instinctively in Liberia.... Many of the other students at EMU had lived through conflict, and there was relief in being among them.... In Harrisonburg, a small old city in the Shenandoah Valley, far from Liberia and its sorrows and people who expected something from me, I didn't have to be strong. Every now and then – for instance, when I saw a mother with her children – I would burst into tears. No one at EMU thought that was strange. I met an old man who'd lost his entire family in the Rwandan genocide.

In September 2006, just as Gbowee was embarking on her first full semester of graduate school, she went to New York City to address the UN on the occasion of the fifth anniversary of the passage of Resolution 1325, which dealt with protecting women from gender-based violence and involving them in UN-linked peace efforts. While in New York, she received a call from Abigail Disney, a descendant of the founders of the Walt Disney Company, a feminist, and a philanthropist. Disney and a collaborator, Gini Reticker, wanted to talk with Gbowee about their desire to make a documentary about how the women of Liberia rallied themselves to force the men to stop battling.

=== Women in Peace and Security Network (WIPSEN) ===
During 2006-07 Gbowee also began talking with Ekiyor and Ecoma Alaga (a Nigerian, like Ekiyor) about splitting WIPNET from WANEP, believing the parent organization to be controlled financially by men and wanting the three of them to be fully in charge. The founding director of WANEP, Gbowee's old friend Sam Gbaydee Doe, was sympathetic to the three women's desire for structural independence, but he had left WANEP to pursue a PhD in England. WANEP was now led by another graduate of the MA in conflict transformation program at EMU, Emmanuel Bombande of Ghana, who did not agree that the three women owned the WIPNET branch of WANEP and thus would not let it spin off. As a result, Gbowee and her two colleagues started a new organization, Women in Peace and Security Network (WIPSEN), also based in Accra, Ghana." Abigail Disney stepped up to help Gbowee raise funds for launching WIPSEN among philanthropists in New York, enabling her to secure $50,000 in seed money.

=== Personal life and struggles ===
By the time Gbowee finished her coursework at EMU on 30 April 2007, and returned to her children in Liberia in May 2007 – where her parents had been caring for them – she realized that her nine months away "nearly broke all of us." In Virginia, she had lived with "a cold that never went away" and she "felt panic, sadness, and cold, swirling blackness" as she faced "being sued by former friends at WANEP over our desire to move in a new direction." Her impending graduate degree (conferred at the end of 2007), growing fame, and other changes in her life strained the relationship she had with a Liberian man named Tunde, an employee of international agencies who had functioned as a father figure for her children for a decade, from the early period of the Liberian women's peace movement through Gbowee's graduate studies at EMU (for which he had paid the tuition). They broke up and by early 2008 Gbowee was in a relationship with a Liberian information technology expert whom she identifies as James. He is the father of her sixth child, a daughter named Jaydyn Thelma Abigail, born in New York City on 2 June 2009.

In April 2008, when Gbowee's family and friends gathered to celebrate the 14th birthday of her eldest daughter, Amber, it was clear that Gbowee had developed a serious alcohol problem. In her memoir, Gbowee explains that she had turned to alcohol for about a decade to cope with the loneliness of constant separations from her family, the strain of poverty and war-engendered trauma she suffered from, and the stress of never-ending demands on her time. During Amber's birthday party, Gbowee's children noted that she drank 14 glasses of wine. The next day, she passed out. When again conscious, suffering from an ulcer, she begged James to take her to the doctor: "Then I saw the kids gathered around us, their terrified, helpless faces. After all their losses, this would be the final one. No. Not possible. It might sound too easy, but that was the end for me. I still don't sleep easily and I still wake up too early, but I don't drink anymore."

== Religious views ==
Gbowee, during the Liberian Civil War, utilized various religious and spiritual techniques to address crises created by the conflict. She expressed her usage of religious music, traditional songs, and other pieces that were sung by her counterparts in adjacent Muslim communities. After winning the Nobel Prize in 2011, she did multiple interviews specifying the importance of her inclusion and determination in using religion as the stepping stone for achieving peace in Liberia. On October 6, 2016, Gbowee did an interview with Harvard Divinity Schools, presenting a talk entitled "Women as Catalysts for Local and Global Spiritually-Engaged Movements for Sustainable Peace."

Gbowee used religion and spirituality as strategies to rally women for ending Liberia's two civil wars. Tactics that she used such as religious and traditional songs to help create a bonding community with her women. Throughout her memoir, Mighty Be Our Powers: How Sisterhood, Prayer, and Sex Changed a Nation at War; a Memoir, One can perceive the influence of her religious beliefs on initiatives for restoring peace in Liberia. After the second civil war broke out in 1999, increasing the already existing problem of rape and systematic brutality in Liberia, Gbowee felt the need for an inter-religious call for action. In response to this second wave of deadly conflict, Gbowee formed an inter-religious peace building coalition of Christian and Muslim women, which lead to the uproar of the Liberia Mass Action for Peace Movement. With her involvement in these powerful settings, Gbowee gained a great amount of leadership skills in which she combined with her religious background. During the LMAPM, she along with other women activists, formed multiple pray-ins, using it as a form of nonviolent protest. These pray-ins called for reconciliation and demanded concrete actions to end the war during peace talks around West Africa. Gbowee, along with many other women, such as Thelma Ekiyor, combined religion and traditional practices to define their approach to conflict transformation, peace building, and security.

Gbowee's faith had a major impact on her personal and professional life. Prayer is a recurrent theme in her memoir and talks. Although her memoir depicts instances of loss, pain, grief, and disappointment that made her question her faith, she indicates that prayer has been an intrinsic part of her journey in peace building. She writes, "God is ever faithful, ever loving; he listens to our prayers." She used prayer as a source of protection, hope, and guidance in her activist work. Gbowee perceive Christianity to be very self-serving and crucial to the social and cultural realities of the Liberian people. Gbowee believes that for adequate results to be seen in conflict situations, especially the ones in which she was involved in, prayer had to occupy center stage. This is a central characteristic of her identity as a global activist as it is an important part of her work. Being involved in groups such as the Christian Women's Peace Initiative (CWI), helped her to embody this part of her faith into bringing peace and teaching peace to others over the past year.

Religion influenced Gbowee's approach to peace building as a type of mothering. In fact, she engages the often marginalized voices of women and young men who bear the brunt of war. Gbowee has used religion to achieve many of her activist roles throughout her traveling career and teaching in healing spaces. An important role that she and other powerful women such as Ekiyor, used religion as a support tool to mother those who have been traumatized, searching for peace within their communities, their homes, and their country. Praying had always been a part of Gbowee's life, especially in her romantic life. Using prayer for her was a healing tool that helped her overcome her abusive relationships and protect her children. One aspect of Gbowee using religion and faith as a form of mothering is by using it as a resource to help whoever she is helping feel connected. She used her faith and beliefs, especially the bible to help them understand their shared experiences and trauma. In September 2016, Gbowee did an interview at the Harvard Divinity School on "Religion and The Practice of Peace." She points out that Religion and spirituality were common aspects in the lives of the women who participated in the Liberian Women's Mass Action for Peace. These spiritual encounters are what she used in her community to mobilize and empower women to take action in all aspects of their lives, whether personal, spiritual, or political. In the Harvard interview, she states:

"In our group the first thing we did was to hold three days of consultative meetings. The first day we brought only Christian women, and we went back into the Bible to find those things in the Bible that women did. We wanted to really show them (Christian women) that God had a way of using women and that there's a place for women in turning around the history of their nations. So, we took them to the Bible, and we used women of faith as examples—Esther, Deborah, Rahab the Prostitute—who had done great things to turn the tide. We used those women as the springboard for really mobilizing women."

Religion and the bible enabled Gbowee to convey her vision to Liberian women with different creeds. In order to build stronger communities for peace-building and promoting activism included the containment of other religious groups, which is a big part of the Women's movement's success. However, for Gbowee, building a stronger community amongst women that will put them at the forefront of such a major movement for the end of wars and not limiting her beliefs to just Christianity, is a tactic she encouraged. In the Harvard interview, she states, "The second thing we did was to bring the Muslim women together and go through the same process, but with the Qur'an...We would talk and read some of the descriptions that talk about how to treat women better and live a nonviolent life..."

Using faith as a common denominator amongst all women, helped them to create a closer leadership bond. Gbowee came from a mixed religious and spiritual community where her parents were Christians, but their close friends and neighbors were Muslims. Using religion to bring young people together, especially for young girls and women, became a motive and a goal for Gbowee to help breed leadership and women empowerment skills through her activism, creating new leaders for the future.

Gbowee worked in multiple healing spaces, for example, the Trauma Healing Office, where she traveled around Liberia to different communities, trying to educate people on how to deal with their traumas. She felt as if this is her calling from God. Because of the severity of the war and her trying to provide for her family, keeping a strong faith is used to help provide comfort through her work, especially since her target is towards weakened women and young boys who have been a part of the destructive process against their wills. Through her activism work in her communities in Liberia, it is fueled by her experiences at home. She is not able to mother her children the way she wanted, and to her, apart from her children, not losing faith is most important for her. People whom she had helped in both Liberia and Ghana referred to her as being "Big Mama" or "Mother of Peace".

Religion and spirituality for Gbowee are considered essential in the peace coalition and the healing of everyone and everywhere. She believes that to overcome injustices that take over people's livelihood and the way they live their day to day lives, it calls for true believers. Being a religious person in these settings, for Gbowee, revenge is not the way to go. She recounts reading the bible and searching for different accounts that encourage peace and not an "eye for an eye." For Gbowee, religion and its relevance helps to teach compassion and practice forgiveness which had also contributed to the success of her activism work. Working with angered people who had dealt with social and political trauma, forgiveness became a part of the healing process and education for her intended audiences. To Gbowee, forgiveness does not have a specific religious practice attached to it, but multiple. She mentions at a peace conference that, "In my life's journey, it hasn't been just Christians who have reached out to me. It hasn't been just Muslims. It has been people of different faiths."

In terms of her contributions to the conceptions of violence, Gbowee also used her faith to emphasize the importance of non-violence approaches. This is especially prominent in the Women's movement and her involvement while working with the Women in Peace-building Network (WIPNET). She used women who are also strong in faith and who have struggles with close contact with acts of violence although all were in a larger sense. Many of the women that were active with Gbowee, faced violence such as sexual, physical, emotional, mental, and physical forces. Traditional religious songs and dances were used in the non-violent, healing, and peace. These dances and songs are used as a form of storytelling.

Gbowee expresses devotion to her Christian faith. She opened the acknowledgment section of her memoir with these words: "All praise, glory and honor to God for His unfailing love and favor toward me." She told students attending an EMU chapel in 2009:

I didn't get there by myself... or anything I did as an individual, but it was by the grace and mercy of God.... He has held my hands. In the most difficult of times, he has been there. They have this song, "Order my steps in your ways, dear Lord," and every day as I wake up, that is my prayer, because there's no way that anyone can take this journey as a peace builder, as an agent of change in your community, without having a sense of faith.... As I continue this journey in this life, I remind myself: All that I am, all that I hope to be, is because of God.

Gbowee told the EMU students that she went from being an angry, broke, virtually homeless, 25-year-old mother of four children with no idea of what her future might be, to listening to the voice of God in 1997. She said God spoke to her through a five-year-old boy, a son whom she had nicknamed Nuku. Comments made by Nuku made her realize that she had succumbed to "crippling hopelessness", and that her low self-esteem and sense of helplessness were destroying her family, which was already under assault from Liberia's brutal warfare. Gbowee said she began taking one tiny step at a time, asking for God's help with each step. And that God sent her angels in the form of human beings who reached out a hand at just the moment when she was most desperate.

As suggested by the interfaith character of the Liberian women's movement, Gbowee noted that others may derive the same support from religious faiths different from hers:

It could be Jesus, it could be Mohammed, it could be Buddha, but there is no way that you can effect change in people's lives if there is not someone that you can rely on as the "divine intervenor" or the "divine one" that you can call on every day.... God is faithful, whoever you know him to me.... Take a step of faith and God will see to the rest.

In an interview with Odyssey Networks, Gbowee said that God could also be referred to as a "Higher Power." She stressed that with a Higher Power accompanying you, you can "rise up and do something to change your situation." She advised: "Don't wait for a Gandhi, don't wait for a King, don't wait for a Mandela. You are your own Mandela, you are your own Gandhi, you are your own King."

== Documentary film ==
Gbowee is the narrator and central character in the 2008 documentary film Pray the Devil Back to Hell, which consists of scores of film and audio clips from the war period. It took Best Documentary Feature in the 2008 Tribeca Film Festival in New York. It has been broadcast across the United States as part of the "Women, War & Peace" series, which aired over five successive Tuesdays in October and early November 2011 on public television stations. Pray has been used as an advocacy tool in conflict and post-conflict zones, such as Bosnia, Afghanistan, Iraq, South Africa, Rwanda, Mexico, Kenya, Cambodia, Russia, Sudan, the Democratic Republic of the Congo, and the West Bank: "The reaction was remarkably similar: no matter how different the country and the society, women recognized themselves and started talking about how they could unite to solve their own problems."

In the documentary, Gbowee emerges as someone able to laugh and enjoy life, despite what she has lived through: "Gbowee comes across as a sharply strategic, scrappy, political maestro interfaith mobilizer of merriment. Not the balloons-confetti-cupcakes-clown-type fun, but rather solidarity-inspiring conviviality. You see women dancing, singing, smiling, wearing beautiful, white-as-doves clothing, and you even see laughter during sit-ins and protests."

== Awards and recognitions ==
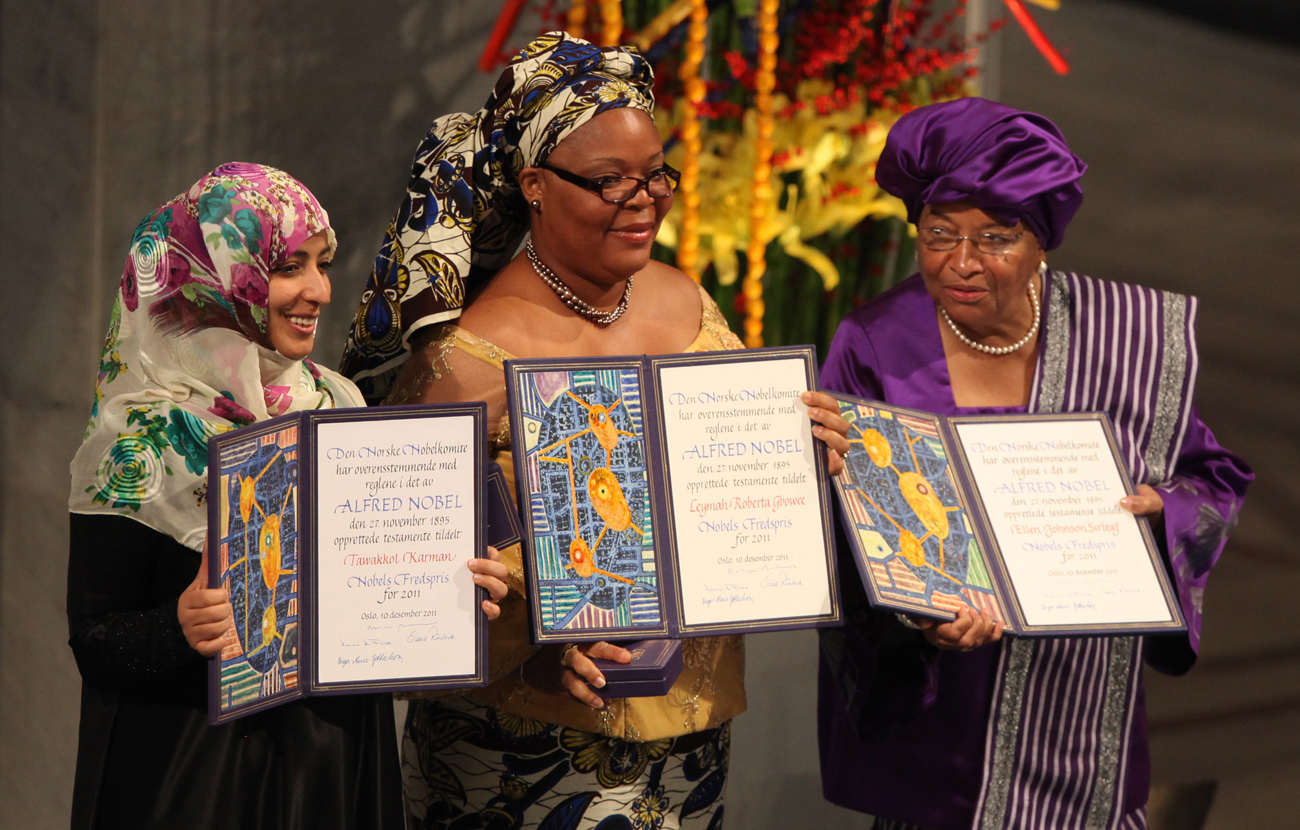
From left to right:Tawakkul Karman, Leymah Gbowee, and Ellen Johnson Sirleaf display their awards during the presentation of the Nobel Peace Prize, 10 December 2011.

Gbowee's exposure to the New York philanthropic social set, facilitated by Disney (who had become a close friend), opened the door for a series of awards. The first, from the John F. Kennedy School of Government at Harvard, came in early 2006, and then they began to arrive in accelerated fashion: recognition by Women's eNews, the Gruber Prize for Women's Rights, the John F. Kennedy Profile in Courage Award, the Living Legends Award for Service to Humanity, and several more. In July 2011, EMU announced that Gbowee had been named its "Alumna of the Year". (Gbowee's eldest son, Joshua "Nuku" Mensah, entered EMU as a freshman in 2010, overlapping by one year with Sam Gbaydee Doe's eldest daughter, Samfee Doe, then a senior.) The crowning honor came in October 2011 when the Norwegian Nobel Committee made Gbowee one of three female recipients of the 2011 Nobel Peace Prize. In 2022, Gbowee was a Bartels World Affairs Fellows at Cornell University, giving the annual Bartels World Affairs Lecture.

=== Awards ===
- 2019 – Golden Plate Award of the American Academy of Achievement presented by Awards Council member Peter Gabriel.
- 2016 – Community of Christ International Peace Award
- 2014 – Oxfam America Right the Wrong Award
- 2013 – The New York Women's Foundation Century Award
- 2013 – Barnard College Medal of Distinction
- 2012 – Olympic flag bearer in the 2012 Summer Olympics opening ceremony
- 2012 - James Parks Morton Interfaith Award
- 2011 – Nobel Peace Prize laureate
- 2011 – University of Massachusetts Lowell Greeley Scholar for Peace Studies
- 2011 – Villanova Peace Award from Villanova University
- 2011 – Alumna of the Year, Eastern Mennonite University
- 2010 – Living Legends Award for Service to Humanity
- 2010 – John Jay Medal for Justice from the John Jay College of Criminal Justice
- 2010 – Joli Humanitarian Award from Riverdale Country School
- 2009 – Gruber Prize for Women's Rights
- 2009 – John F. Kennedy Profile in Courage Award.
- 2009 – "Honor Award for Courageous Commitment for Human Rights of Women" by the Filmfestival Women's Worlds, TERRE DES FEMMES, Germany.
- 2008 – Women's eNews Leaders for the 21st Century Award
- 2007 – Blue Ribbon for Peace from the John F. Kennedy School of Government at Harvard University

=== Honorary degrees ===
- 2024 – Honorary Doctorate, delivery of the Oliver Tambo lecture, Georgetown University
- 2018 – Honorary Doctorate of International Affairs from American University
- 2012 – Honorary Doctorate by Rhodes University

== Other activities ==
- Carnegie Corporation of New York, Member of the Board of Trustees (since 2020)
- Calouste Gulbenkian Prize for Human Rights, Member of the Jury (since 2018)
- Ara Pacis Initiative, Member of the Council
- Aurora Prize, Member of the Selection Committee (since 2015)
- High Level Taskforce for the International Conference on Population and Development, Member
- Nobel Women's Initiative, Member of the Board
- PeaceJam Foundation, Member of the Board
- World Refugee & Migration Council (WRMC), Member of the Council

== Works ==
- (with Carol Mithers) (2011). Mighty Be Our Powers: How Sisterhood, Prayer and Sex Changed a Nation at War: A Memoir. New York: Beast Books. ISBN 978-0-9842951-5-9. OCLC 751747258.

== See also ==
- Gender Inequality in Liberia
- Black Nobel Prize laureates
- List of female Nobel laureates
- List of peace activists
- List of women who led a revolt or rebellion
- Sex strike
- Lysistrata
- International Women´s Day: Interview With Leymah Gbowee at * Global Education Magazine

Awards and achievements
Preceded by Liu Xiaobo	Laureate of the Nobel Peace Prize; 2011; With: Tawakel Karman and Ellen Johnson Sirleaf	Succeeded by European Union
