= Trần Tố Nga =

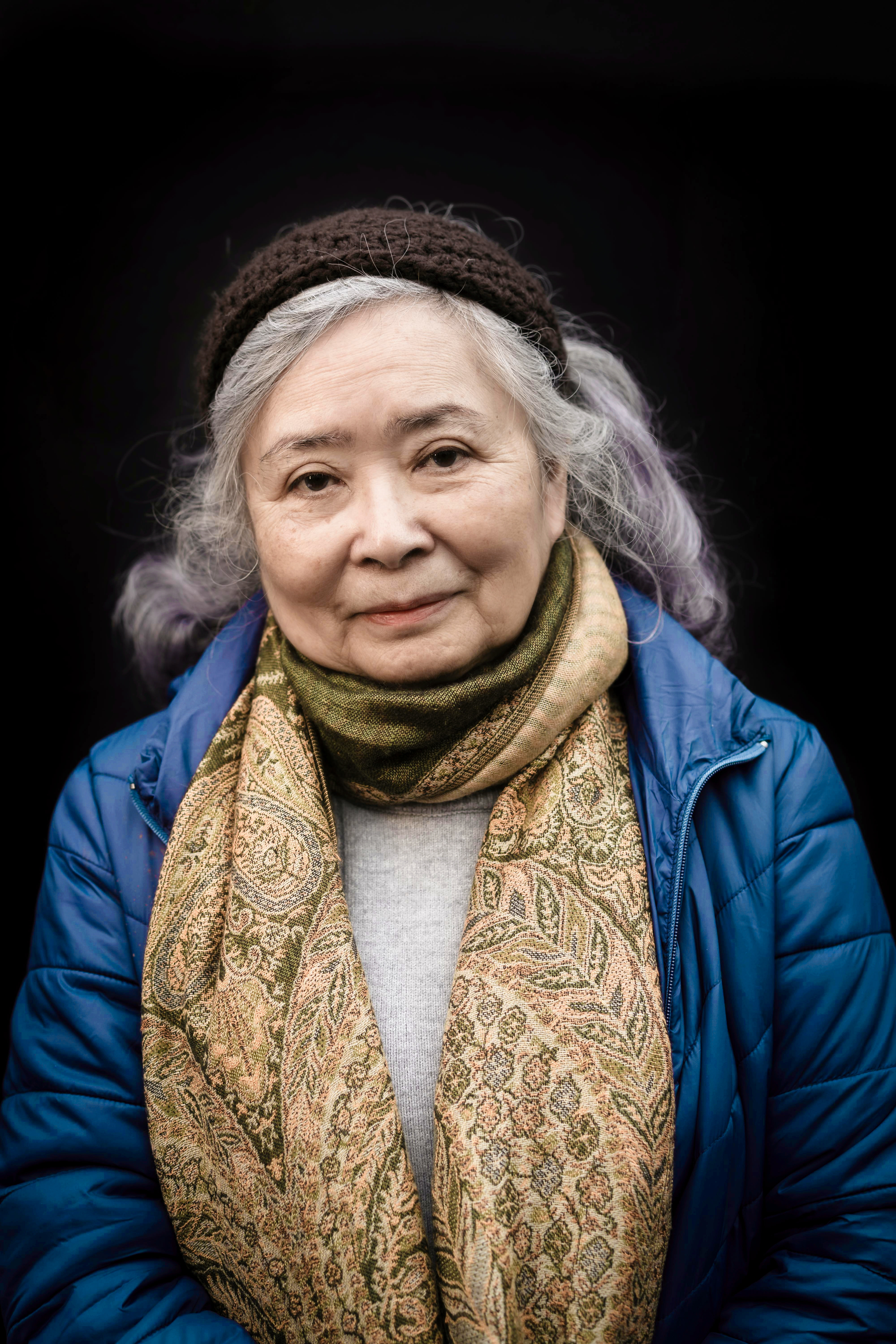
- Born: 30 March 1942 (age 84); Sóc Trăng, French Cochinchina
- Citizenship: French
- Organisation: National Liberation Front of South Vietnam
- Known for: Legal action against companies complicit in manufacturing Agent Orange

Trần Tố Nga (born 30 March 1942) is a French-Vietnamese environmental activist. During the Vietnam War, she was a journalist, then a liaison officer for the National Liberation Front of South Vietnam. After the war, she became a school principal before running a travel agency.

== Biography ==
Trần Tố Nga was born into a wealthy family in Sóc Trăng that favored Vietnamese independence from France. She was educated at the Marie Curie school in Saigon where she learned French. In 1955, at the age of 13, she was sent to Hanoi in North Vietnam by her mother, then a resistance fighter, to shelter her in case she was arrested.

Trần Tố Nga obtained her university degree in Chemistry in 1965, in the midst of the Vietnam War, and she joined the movement of the National Liberation Front of South Vietnam the same evening. She traveled on foot for four months, notably on the Ho Chi Minh trail, and joined the maquis in the South. While covering the events as a journalist, Trần Tố Nga was contaminated by Agent Orange.

In 1966, in the region of Củ Chi (north of Saigon), she saw a "white cloud", a long trail in the wake of an American army C-123, as she wrote in her autobiography, “A sticky rain trickles down my shoulders and smears on my skin. A fit of coughing takes me. […] I am going to wash myself. And then I immediately forget. In the months that followed, she was again the victim of the spraying of Agent Orange that the United States poured by the millions of liters on Vietnam between 1961 and 1970: "As I followed the troops of the National Front for the Liberation of South Vietnam for the news agency Giải Phóng, I walked through the jungle, walked in the swamps, soaking myself in wetlands and polluted soils”. For her activities as a journalist and liaison officer for the National Liberation Front of South Vietnam, she will be imprisoned and released on 30 April 1975, the day of the reunification of Vietnam.

Her eldest daughter, Việt Hải, born in 1968 in the maquis, suffers from a heart defect, tetralogy of Fallot. Her daughter died at the age of 17 months. Tran To Nga has two other daughters, one born in 1971 and the other in prison in 1974. They both have heart and bone defects. She herself suffers from breast cancer, type 2 diabetes, alpha-thalassemia, and recurrent tuberculosis, pathologies caused by dioxin. In her biography, she summarizes: "my descendants and I are poisoned. Examination of the famous list of diseases established by the Americans allows us to say that I suffer from 5 of the 17 inventoried pathologies."

== Fighting the Effects of Agent Orange ==
Trần Tố Nga testified at the Opinion Tribunal for Vietnamese Agent Orange/Dioxin Victims, which took place in Paris on 15 and 16 May 2009. The judges hailed from Africa, North and South America, Asia and Europe, the tribunal was presided over by Judge Jitendra Sharma. The conclusions of this tribunal were given to the President of Vietnam, the President of the United States and the Secretary General of the United Nations.

In the spring of 2014, she assigned 26 multinationals in the American agrochemical industry that had manufactured or supplied Agent Orange, including Monsanto and Dow Chemical. The Agent Orange spilled on the lands of South Vietnam, part of Cambodia and Laos, in particular to defoliate the Ho Chi Minh trail, contained dioxin (TCDD), a toxic manufacturing residue. Alongside her are the support committee for Trần Tố Nga, the Vietnam Dioxine collective, the Stop Monsanto-Bayer collective and agrochemicals, as well as many other political figures and environmental and solidarity associations: the collective zero chlordecone zero poison, MEP Marie Toussaint, jurist Valérie Cabanes, etc.

Following the developments (disappearance, mergers, acquisitions) of these companies, fourteen firms were finally assigned to the trial: Dow Chemical Company, Monsanto Company, Hercules Inc, Uniroyal Chemical Co Inc, Uniroyal Chemical Acquisition Corporation, Uniroyal Inc, Uniroyal Chemical Holding Company, Occidental Chemical Corporation, Maxus Energy Corporation, Tierra Solution Inc, Chemical Land Holdings, Th Agriculture and Nutrition Co, Hacros Chemicals Inc, Pharmacia & Upjohn Incorporated.

The high court of Evry receives the complaint, thanks to a modification of the law which authorizes a French national to bring a legal action for acts committed outside French territory by a foreigner. The civil complaint is filed by lawyers Bertrand Repolt, Amélie Lefebvre and the tenor of the bar William Bourdon. The status hearing of 29 June 2020 set the date for oral arguments in the trial brought by Trần Tố Nga for 12 October 2020 hearing then postponed to 25 January 2021.

Two op-eds signed by numerous personalities and associations, calling for “justice for Trần Tố Nga and the victims of Agent Orange”, were published on 7 August 2020 and 18 January 2021. Many associations and political personalities signed a letter of support for Trần Tố Nga in her lawsuit against American chemical companies, published in June 2021.

The pleadings took place on 25 January 2021, the decision of the court of first instance was rendered on 10 May 2021. The court ruled the request inadmissible, adopting the arguments of the agrochemical companies. Trần Tố Nga's lawyers appealed against this decision. The appeal court rejected the case on 22 August 2024, citing "the companies' immunity status". She will appeal this decision at France's highest court.

Her activism and litigation against American companies is depicted in the documentary film The People vs. Agent Orange. the Paris Court of Appeal filed this appeal on August 22, taking up a second time the arguments of the agrochemical companies.
