= Cooked: Survival by Zip Code =

- Directed by: Judith Helfand
- Produced by: Judith Helfand; Fenell Doremus
- Cinematography: Tod Lending; Stanley Staniski; Keith Walker
- Edited by: Simeon Hutner; David E. Simpson
- Music by: T. Griffin
- Production companies: Judith Helfand Productions; ITVS; Kartemquin Films; Independent Lens; JustFilms/Ford Foundation; Fork Films
- Distributed by: Journeyman Pictures
- Release dates: November 11, 2018 (DOC NYC); August 28, 2019 (United States)
- Running time: 79 minutes
- Country: United States
- Language: English

Cooked: Survival by Zipcode is a 2018 American documentary film, directed and produced by Judith Helfand. It follows the 1995 Chicago heat wave which resulted in the deaths of 739 people, primarily affecting poor and disadvantaged communities.

The film had its world premiere at DOC NYC on November 11, 2018. It was released through video on demand on August 28, 2019, by Journeyman Pictures, followed by a broadcast on Independent Lens on February 3, 2020.

== Synopsis ==
The film follows the 1995 Chicago heat wave, resulting in the deaths of 739 people, primarily in poor and disadvantaged areas. Using this natural disaster as a jumping off point, the film reframes the politics of disaster arguing that disadvantaged communities should be treated as disasters taking place.

== Release ==
The film had its world premiere at DOC NYC on November 11, 2018. It was released through video on demand on August 28, 2019, by Journeyman Pictures. It was broadcast on Independent Lens on February 3, 2020.
