= For Ahkeem =

2017 documentary film

- Directed by: Landon Van Soest and Jeremy S. Levine
- Release date: February 17, 2017 (Berlin International Film Festival)

For Ahkeem is a 2017 documentary film directed by Landon Van Soest and Jeremy S. Levine. The film centers on a North St. Louis-based teenager, Daje Shelton, and her experience in school and in her personal relationships. For Ahkeem received positive critical reception and garnered awards from festivals such as the Independent Film Festival Boston and the Indie Memphis Film Festival.

== Synopsis ==
The film centers on 17-year-old Daje and her boyfriend, Antonio. It shows a series of events that take place in Daje's life, including her being forced to switch to an alternative school for fighting in school and the birth of her son. The directors use Daje as a voice-over narrator in addition to filming her daily life. The film's title refers to the name of the child that she becomes pregnant with over the course of the film.

== Production ==
For Ahkeem was shot over a period of two years. It happened to overlap with the shooting of Michael Brown and the subsequent Ferguson protests.

The film was directed by Landon Van Soest and Jeremy S. Levine. The cinematography was done by Nicholas Weissman. It premiered at the 2017 Berlin Film Festival.

== Critical reception ==
Critics received For Ahkeem positively. The film has a score of 96% on Rotten Tomatoes. Peter Keough wrote for The Boston Globe, "Levine and Van Soest relate Daje’s story with an impressionistic intimacy, catching her in key moments, sometimes with diaristic voice-over narration." David Ehrlich stated on IndieWire, "...the film effectively leverages the experience of its teenage heroine in order to illustrate that "bad kids" are a product of our failures, and not their own."
