= Bill Moyers Journal =

American current affairs television series (1972–76; 1979–81; 2007–10)

- 2009 title screenshot.
- Starring: Bill Moyers
- Country of origin: United States
- No. of episodes: 16 (original); ? (2nd install.); 276 (3rd install.)

Production
- Running time: 60 minutes

Original release
- Network: PBS
- Release: 1972 – 1976
- Release: 1979 – 1981
- Release: 2007 – 2010

Bill Moyers Journal was an American television current affairs program that covered an array of current affairs and human issues, including economics, history, literature, religion, philosophy, science, and most frequently politics. Bill Moyers executive produced, wrote and hosted the Journal when it was created. WNET in New York produced it and PBS aired it from 1972 to 1976.

In 1979, following a nearly three-year hiatus, PBS announced that Bill Moyers Journal would return for a second series, which would cover a broader range of issues in depth. This included election coverage and documentary footage from several U.S. states, among them Florida, Texas, Illinois, Washington, D.C., and Nevada. In addition, among its pop-culture coverage, the Journal reported on the 25th anniversary of the premiere of the long-running NBC talk program The Tonight Show. Like the first installment, the second one was produced by WNET in New York City, and was aired on PBS. The second installment ended in 1981.

For the second time, Bill Moyers Journal returned to television on April 25, 2007. The debut episode was "Buying The War", which demonstrated how the commercial U.S. media served as an unwitting partner to the Bush administration in convincing the American people that the Iraq War was legitimate and necessary.

On November 20, 2009, Moyers announced that he would retire from the Journal effective April 30, 2010. The April 30, 2010, 90-minute special series finale reported on Iowa Citizens for Community Improvement and featured an interview with community organizer Jim Hightower. Moyers concluded with an interview with writer Barry Lopez and a personal reflection on his relationship to journalism.

Bill Moyers Journal's website provides an extensive video, blog, and transcript archive dating back to 1974, and includes NOW on PBS, the program Moyers hosted from 2002 to 2004, during his hiatus from the Journal.

== Kathleen Hughes ==
Kathleen Hughes directed episodes of Bill Moyers Journal (2007–2010). In 1985, Hughes received a master’s in journalism from Columbia University. Hughes was an assistant film editor for Vladimir Horowitz: The Last Romantic (1985) by Albert and David Maysles. Hughes has produced, directed, and written documentaries for Bill Moyers (with cinematographer Maryse Alberti), PBS Frontline and ABC News' Turning Point. Her works have won Emmys, a New York Emmy, the DuPont-Columbia Gold Baton, the Wilbur Award, the Gracie Award, the Sidney Hillman Prize, the Society of Professional Journalists First Amendment Award, the Harry Chapin Media Award, and the Christopher Award. Hughes and Abigail Disney directed The Armor of Light (2015) and The American Dream and Other Fairy Tales (2022).
