= The First Step (film) =

- Directed by: Brandon Kramer
- Produced by: Lance Kramer
- Starring: Van Jones
- Cinematography: Emily Topper
- Edited by: Natasha Livia Mottola; Steven Golliday; Leslie Simmer; Sara Fusco
- Music by: Joshua Abrams
- Production companies: Meridian Hill Pictures; Magic Labs Media; Hidden Empire Film Group; Big Mouth Productions; Artemis Rising Foundation; Fork Films; Kartemquin Films
- Distributed by: Meridian Hill Pictures
- Release dates: June 10, 2021 (Tribeca); February 17, 2023 (United States)
- Running time: 90 minutes
- Country: United States
- Language: English

The First Step is a 2021 American documentary film, directed by Brandon Kramer. It follows Van Jones, as he pushes for criminal justice reform.

It had its world premiere at the Tribeca Film Festival on June 10, 2021. It was released on February 17, 2023, by Meridian Hill Pictures.

== Synopsis ==
The film follows Van Jones as he pushes for criminal justice reform. Louis L. Reed, Jessica Jackson, Virgie Walker, Pete White, Tylo James, Fabian Debora, Douglas Copenhaver, Martin West, Dee Pierce, William Thompson, Rhonda Edmunds, Jared Kushner, Bernie Sanders, Cory Booker, Kamala Harris, Shelley Moore Capito, Rand Paul, Mike Lee, Karen Bass, Bonnie Watson Coleman, Patrisse Cullors, Charlamagne tha God, Karen Hunter, and Kim Kardashian appear in the film.

== Release ==
The film had its world premiere at the Tribeca Film Festival on June 10, 2021. It also screened at AFI Docs on June 23, 2021. It was released on February 17, 2023, by Meridian Hill Pictures.

== Critical reception ==
The First Step holds an 85% approval rating on review aggregator website Rotten Tomatoes, based on 13 reviews, with a weighted average of 6.80/10.
