= Love & Stuff =

- Directed by: Judith Helfand; David Cohen (co-director)
- Written by: Judith Helfand; David Cohen
- Produced by: Hilla Medalia; Julie Parker Benello
- Starring: Judith Helfand
- Cinematography: Daniel Gold
- Edited by: Marina Katz; David Cohen
- Music by: Paul Brill
- Production companies: Judith Helfand Productions; Medalia Productions; Secret Sauce Media; Artemis Rising Foundation; Impact Partners; Wavelength Productions; The New York Times; Whitewater Films; Fork Films
- Release date: May 28, 2020 (Hot Docs)
- Running time: 78 minutes
- Country: United States
- Language: English

Love & Stuff is a 2020 American documentary film written, directed, and produced by Judith Helfand. It follows Helfand as she deals with her mothers belongings following her death, and becoming a mother.

It had its world premiere at Hot Docs Canadian International Film Festival on May 28, 2020.

== Synopsis ==
The film follows Judith Helfand, as she goes through her mothers belongings following her death, and becoming a mother for the very first time.

== Production ==
The film is a continuation of a 2014 New York Times Op-ed documentary, picking up where it leaves off. The project was initially conceived and edited as a documentary series, however, it struggled to get funding as platforms only agreed to commit to it once it was further along. It was then re-edited into a feature-length film.

== Release ==
The film had its world premiere at the Hot Docs Canadian International Film Festival on May 28, 2020. It also screened at DOC NYC on November 11, 2020.

== Reception ==
Love and Stuff holds an 80% approval rating on review aggregator website Rotten Tomatoes, based on five reviews, with an average of 5.6/10.
