= Gini Reticker =

American filmmaker and producer

- Born: Virginia Reticker
- Occupations: Filmmaker; producer
- Years active: 1987–present

Virginia "Gini" Reticker (/ˈrɛtɪkər/ RET-ik-ər) is an American filmmaker and producer. She directed the films The Heart of the Matter, Pray the Devil Back to Hell, and A Decade Under the Influence.

== Career ==
In 1987, she started to work as a film editor on the documentary Fire From the Mountain. She later made her directorial debut with the film The Heart of the Matter. The film received critical acclaim and later received a nomination for the Grand Jury Prize at the Sundance Film Festival. The film was then presented with the Freedom of Expression Award. With the success of the film, she participated in the documentary short film Asylum alongside Sandy McLeod. Both of them received an Oscar nomination in the category Best Documentary Short at the 76th Academy Awards. Later, Reticker received honorable mention recognition for Short Filmmaking at the Sundance Film Festival.

In 2005 she received a News & Documentary Emmy Award for her participation in the episode Ladies First of the popular television serial Wide Angle. Then, she was nominated at the Primetime Emmy Award ceremony for the film A Decade Under the Influence. In 2007, she founded the film production company 'Fork Films' along with Abigail Disney and currently works as the Chief Creative Officer. Through the 'Fork Films', she worked as an executive producer for several blockbuster hits including: 1971, Cameraperson, Alias Ruby Blade, Citizen Koch, Hot Girls Wanted, and She’s Beautiful When She’s Angry. In 2008 she made the documentary film Pray the Devil Back to Hell in which she captured the women's movement that protested for peace in Liberia. The film later won the Tribeca Best Documentary Award.

She made the film Ladies First which garnered an Emmy Award. The film revolves around several women rebuilding post-genocide Rwanda. In the meantime, she created and produced the PBS series Women, War & Peace. With several critical acclaims, the serial won the Edward R. Murrow Award given by Overseas Press Club as well as The Academy of Television Honors Award. Then she co-directed the film Betrayal (Nerahkoon) which was nominated for both an Academy Award and an Independent Spirit Award. In 2015, she directed the documentary The Trials of Spring. The film revolves around Hend Nafea, who started a journey from an Egyptian village during the 2011 Arab Spring and later became a social activist.

== Filmography ==
- The Heart of the Matter (1994)
- New School Order (1997)
- The Changing Face of Beauty (2000)
- Asylum (2003)
- A Decade Under the Influence (2003)
- In the Company of Women (2004)
- Pray the Devil Back to Hell (2008)
- POV (2009)
- Hot Girls Wanted (2015)
- The Trials of Spring (2015)
- Independent Lens (2016)
