= John Paul Lederach =

American sociologist and professor (born 1955)

- Born: John Paul Lederach; April 17, 1955 (age 70); Indiana, United States
- Education: BA History and Peace Studies Bethel College; Ph.D. Sociology University of Colorado Boulder
- Occupation: Professor
- Known for: author of several books on Conflict Transformation, founder of the Center for Justice and Peacebuilding, professor of conflict studies
- Awards: 2000 - Community of Christ International Peace Award; 2002 - Keys to Access Award from CADRE (the National Center for Dispute Resolution in Special Education); 2006 - Martin Luther King Order of Peace Medal; 2009 Pax Christi Award - St. John's University and Abbey; 2009 Reinhold Neibuhr Award from the University of Notre Dame; 2014 Distinguished Scholar Award - International Studies Association; 2019 Niwano Peace Prize

John Paul Lederach (born 1955) is an American Professor of International Peacebuilding at the University of Notre Dame, Indiana, and concurrently Distinguished Scholar at Eastern Mennonite University. He has written widely on conflict resolution and mediation. He holds a Ph.D. in Sociology from the University of Colorado Boulder. In 1994 he became the founding director for the Center for Justice and Peacebuilding at Eastern Mennonite University where he was a professor. He currently works for the foundation Humanity United.

== Early life and education ==
Lederach was born in Indiana into the family of a local preacher, whom he was named after. He graduated from Bethel College in 1980 with a degree in History and Peace Studies. During this time he was working for the Mennonite Board of Missions in Barcelona, Spain. He then pursued a Ph.D. in sociology with a concentration in the Social Conflict Program from the University of Colorado Boulder, receiving his degree in 1988. During this time (from 1975 to 1996) he was also active with the Mennonite Central Committee serving for a time as the Director of the Mennonite Conciliation Service.

== Academic work ==
Lederach's theories of elicitive methods of conflict resolution have been influential in the fields of political science, peace studies, international relations and conflict transformation. His works have been published in English, Catalan and Spanish.

His academic work draws on his experience in the field as a mediator, negotiator, peacebuilding practitioner, trainer and consultant. At the international level, this has involved input into peace processes in Somalia, Northern Ireland, Nicaragua, Colombia and Nepal. Within communities, his work has often been at the level of reconciliation within church and family. In 2014 he said:

Change only comes through ensuring that people are represented. In Somalia where I did a lot of my early work, there was no government and it was a chaotic situation. My job was to engage in longer term bottom-up grassroots work. You do this by establishing organisations for elders, women's associations and so on which build strength into a community by creating space for civil society.

His elective approach to conflict transformation has been developed further systemically by Wolfgang Dietrich within the framework of the Innsbruck School of Peace Studies at the University of Innsbruck, Austria.

Lederach has given keynote speeches, commencement addresses, and lectures, among them a keynote lecture entitled "Narratives of Care: The Social Echo of Community Transformation" at the Conversations on Attachment conference at Eastern Mennonite University. and a lecture entitled "Compassionate Presence: Faith-Based Peacebuilding in the Face of Violence" at the University of San Diego's Joan B. Kroc Institute for Peace & Justice Distinguished Lecture Series.

In an article in Time Magazine, former U.S. Surgeon General Vivek Murthy describes Lederach's influence on his thinking about social policy and his framing of loneliness as a public health concern: "For John Paul Lederach, an international peace builder and expert in conflict transformation, the first step is to promote a mutual sense of belonging. That means meeting and serving people where they live, by physically going to their homes or neighborhoods." Murthy quotes Lederach in Time, as well as in his book, Together: The Healing Power of Human Connection in a Sometimes Lonely World, as observing that "a lot of our isolation…is the degree to which people feel invisible. So, when you come and show up and have concern and conversation from their location, you're rehumanizing the situation that has lost that connection at a very deep level."

== Religion and beliefs ==
Lederach is a Mennonite Christian, and as he wrote in his 1999 book Journey Toward Reconciliation (ISBN 978-0836190823), his Christian faith has affected both his thinking and application of non-violent solutions to conflict. In 2000, he received the Community of Christ International Peace Award.

== Awards and honorary degrees ==
- 2000 - Community of Christ International Peace Award
- 2002 - Keys to Access Award from CADRE (the National Center for Dispute Resolution in Special Education)
- 2006 - Martin Luther King Order of Peace Medal
- 2009 Pax Christi Award - St. John's University and Abbey
- 2009 Reinhold Neibuhr Award from the University of Notre Dame
- 2014 Distinguished Scholar Award - International Studies Association

In 2014 he received honorary degrees from Conrad Grebel College at the University of Waterloo, St. Paul University in Ottawa, Ontario.

== Publications ==
- Els anomenats pacifistes: La no violència a l'estat espanyol, La Magrana, 1983. (in Catalan)
- Enredos, pleitos y problemas Una guía práctica para ayudar a resolver conflictos, Guatemala: Ediciones SEMILLA, 1992, ISBN 84-89389-06-3.
- Preparing for Peace: Conflict Transformation Across Cultures, Syracuse University Press, 1995, ISBN 0-8156-2725-4
- Building Peace: Sustainable Reconciliation in Divided Societies, U.S. Institute of Peace, 1997, ISBN 1-878379-73-9
- The Journey Toward Reconciliation, Pennsylvania: Herald Press, 1999, ISBN 0-8361-9082-3
- From the Ground Up: Mennonite Contributions to International Peacebuilding, 2000, ISBN
- A Handbook of International Peacebuilding: Into The Eye Of The Storm, Jossey-Bass, 2002, ISBN 0-7879-5879-4
- The Little Book of Conflict Transformation, Good Books, 2003, ISBN 1-56148-390-7
- The Moral Imagination: The Art and Soul of Building Peace, Oxford University Press, 2005, ISBN 0-19-517454-2
- Reconcile: Conflict Transformation for Ordinary Christians, Pennsylvania: Herald Press, 2014, ISBN 0-836199030
- Memoirs of Nepal, Blurb Books, 2016

== See also ==
- Reconciliation studies
