= Mats Alvesson =

Swedish business theorist

Mats Alvesson (born 1956) is a Swedish management scholar and professor of business administration at Lund University, particularly known for having made key contributions in forming the field of critical management studies.

== Life and work ==
Alvesson received his Ph.D. in psychology from Lund University in 1983, and holds a chair in the Business Administration department at Lund University School of Economics and Management. Beside his chair in Lund, Alvesson is affiliated as an honorary professor at University of Queensland Business School and as a visiting professor at Stockholm Business School.

Alvesson's research interests span the fields of organization and leadership studies.

== Selected publications ==
- Alvesson, M. & Berg, P. O. (1992) Corporate Culture and Organizational Symbolism: An Overview, Berlin: de Gruyter.
- Alvesson, Mats, and Stanley A. Deetz. Doing critical management research. Sage, 2000.
- Alvesson, Mats. Understanding organizational culture. Sage, 2002.
- Alvesson, Mats, and Kaj Sköldberg. Reflexive methodology: New vistas for qualitative research. Sage, 2009.
- Alvesson, Mats; Gabriel, Yiannis; Paulsen, Roland. Return to Meaning: A Social Science with Something to Say. Oxford University Press, 2017.

Articles, a selection:

- Alvesson, Mats, and Dan Karreman. "Varieties of discourse: On the study of organizations through discourse analysis." Human relations 53.9 (2000): 1125-1149.
- Alvesson, Mats, and Hugh Willmott. "Identity regulation as organizational control: Producing the appropriate individual." Journal of management studies 39.5 (2002): 619-644.
