= Critical management studies =

Left wing approach to management, business and organization

Critical management studies (CMS) is a loose but extensive grouping of theoretically informed critiques of management, business and organisation, grounded originally in a critical theory perspective. Today it encompasses a wide range of perspectives that are critical of traditional theories of management and the business schools that generate these theories.

== History ==
It is widely suggested that CMS began with Mats Alvesson and Hugh Willmott's edited collection Critical Management Studies in 1992. CMS initially brought together critical theory and post-structuralist writings, but has since developed in more diverse directions.

CMS grew at the same time as the global expansion of business schools, especially in north-western Europe. As the narrative has it, decreases in state funding for social sciences and increases in enrolments in business schools during the 1980s resulted in many academics with graduate training in sociology, history, philosophy or related fields of study ending up with jobs "training managers" or training students who wanted to become managers.

Such academics brought different theoretical tools and political perspectives into business schools. They began to question the politics of managerialism and to link the techniques of management to neo-liberalism. These new voices drew on the Frankfurt School of critical theory, and the work of Michel Foucault, Jacques Derrida and Gilles Deleuze. Later Feminism, queer theory, post-colonial theory, anarchism, ecological philosophies, and radical democratic theory also had some influence.

The roots of CMS are contested but are connected to the series of UK Labour Process Conferences that began in 1983 and reflected the impact of Braverman's attempt to make Marxist categories central to understanding work organisations. Industrial relations and labor studies scholars have joined the CMS fold in the US and northwestern Europe, seeking new opportunities for employment as labor and trade union related programs have diminished in number. At the same time a significant strand of critical accounting studies began to develop marked by the publication of Tony Tinker's book Paper Prophets and the appearance of the journal Critical Perspectives on Accounting. Feminist and Marxist work in the sociology of work and organizations also predates the term CMS.

Contrasting with the dominant origin-narrative is an account which states that, along with the contributors to CMS from the intellectual traditions identified here, there is a significant - and overlapping - bloc among CMS scholars of those who have had extensive pre-university experience as workers and managers. The inconsistencies between their experiences in the workplace and the claims of mainstream managerialism, and an intention to connect those experiences to broader explanations and theorizing leads these people to CMS.

== Geographical base ==
The main home of CMS has been in organisation theory and behaviour parts of British, Australian and Scandinavian business schools, though there are strong contributions in related fields such as sociology, sociology of education, and critical pedagogy. Further, contributions stem from accounting with growing interest in other management specialisms, such as marketing, international business, operational research, logistics etc. Since the 1990s academics from North America and other parts of the world are also engaging with this body of writing and research. The CMS Division within the (American) Academy of Management (AoM), with a membership of around 800, is larger and more international than some of its other divisions.

Many heterodox scholars in various parts of the world had been inspired by the international activities of the Standing Conference on Organisational Symbolism. This latter grouping developed work which drew variously on post-structuralism and symbolic interactionism in order to develop a cultural and anthropological understanding of contemporary organizations. Others, though, were without affiliation and/or seeking new formations and alliances. Since 1999 there has been a bi-annual conference, for 'International Critical Management Studies', which has mostly taken place at a UK university with between 100 and 600 delegates. In 2023 the conference took place at Nottingham Business School, hosted by Nottingham Trent University and the University of Nottingham. CMS became a Special Interest Group of the US Academy of Management conference in 2003 before it became a full Division in 2008.

Today there are some concentrations of CMS scholars in the UK at the Organization Studies's research cluster at Sheffield University Management School at the University of Sheffield, the School of Business and Management at Queen Mary University of London, the Essex Business School at the University of Essex, the Business and Management Department at Royal Holloway, the Business School at Manchester Metropolitan University, and Department of Organisation, Work and Technology at Lancaster University, Bayes Business School at City University of London, and Open University Business School, at Open University. There were concentrations at the University of Leicester, and the Alliance Manchester Business School at the University of Manchester, but this is no longer the case as a result of controversial changes in research strategy. Elsewhere, Copenhagen Business School, Lund School of Economics and Management at Lund University and Istanbul Bilgi University have clusters of CMS scholars.

Many CMS scholars globally rely on journals like: Tamara Journal for Critical Organization Studies, ephemera: theory and politics in organization, Culture and Organization, or Organization: the critical journal of organization, theory and society.

== Controversy and debate ==
Major points of debate have focused on CMS's relationship with more orthodox forms of Marxism, on the nature and purposes of CMS critique, on questions of inclusion and exclusion, on the possibilities of social transformation from within business schools, and on the development of alternative models of globalisation.

One trend in CMS has seen the incorporation of autonomist Marxist theory, first introduced to the English-speaking world by the work of Michael Hardt and Antonio Negri. New CMS scholars using these theories have interests in proposing alternative non-capitalist forms of organizing work and life - often built around the notion of collective responsibility for the commons. Other developments include eco-marxist and eco-feminist theories of organization, as well as engagements with post-colonial theory and critical race theory to investigate the way management and business schools contribute to what Cedric Robinson has called racial capitalism.

Wider impatience with market-managerial forms of organization occur commonly enough outside the business school, from anti-corporate protests to popular-media presentations of managers. CMS attempts to articulate these voices within the business school, and to provide ways of thinking beyond current dominant theories and practices of organizations. Increasingly, CMS scholars are interested in better understanding the conditions of possibility for developing anti- and post-capitalist alternatives. This includes research on the social solidarity economy, post-growth organizing and democratic economic planning beyond unplanned coordination by market forces.
