= Roland Paulsen =

Swedish sociologist and author (born 1981)

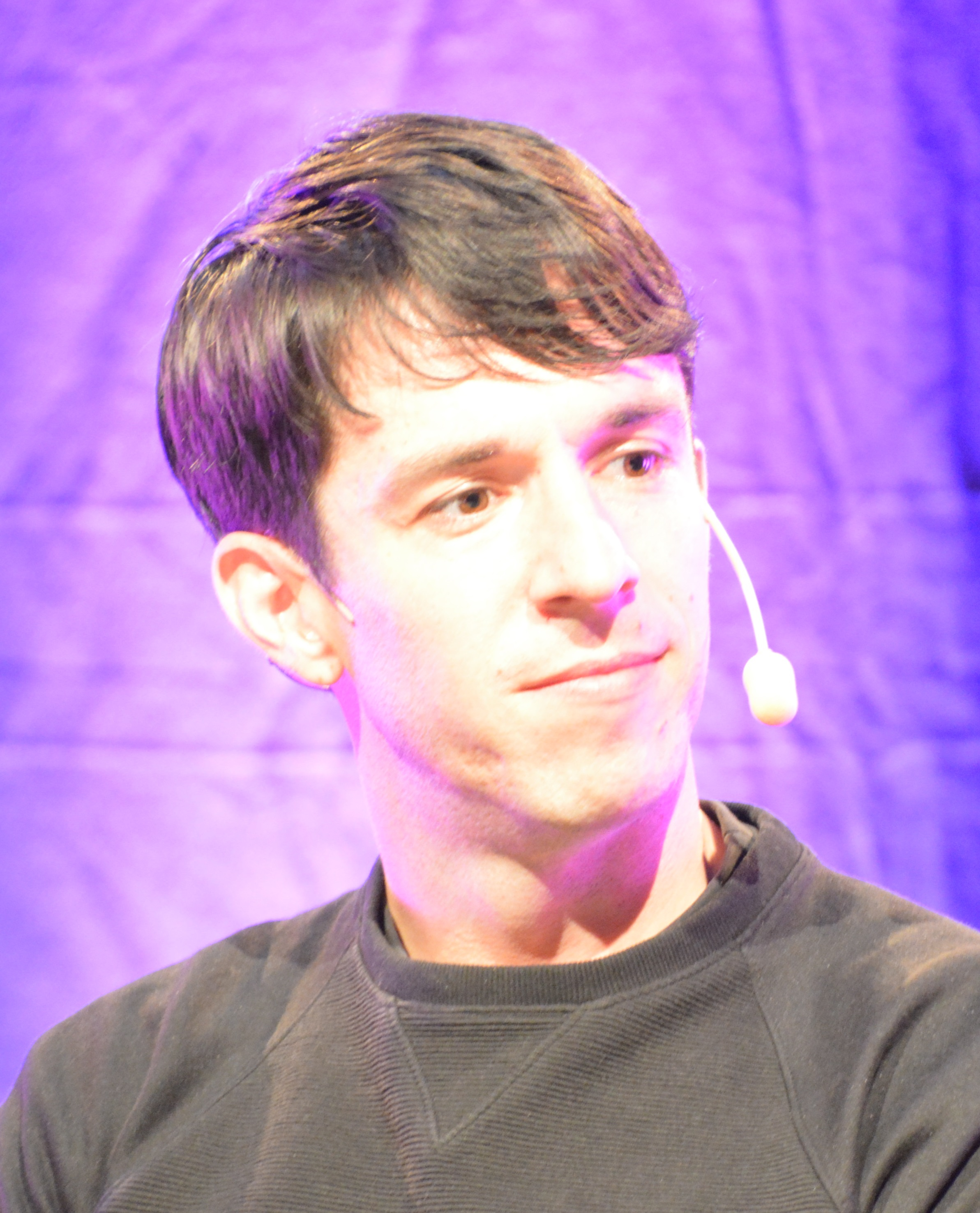
Roland Karl Oscar Ericsson Paulsen

Roland Karl Oscar Ericsson Paulsen (born 17 December 1981) is a Swedish author, sociologist and docent at Lund University.

== Biography ==
Paulsen was born in Hägersten, Stockholm, on 17 December 1981 and grew up in Yttermalung, Dalarna. Paulsen's mother immigrated to Sweden from Switzerland and met the man Paulsen would refer to as his father when Paulsen was four years old. During his childhood, Paulsen's parents ran a goat farm. Paulsen first had the ambition to study psychology, but as he worked as a waiter, he found himself questioning labour and decided to pursue studies within sociology instead.

Paulsen received his PhD in sociology from Uppsala University in 2013. His thesis Empty Labor: Idleness and Workplace Resistance is about people who devote more than half of their work time to private activities, so-called "empty work". The dissertation was published at Cambridge University Press and received international attention from among others The Atlantic, The Economist and The Wall Street Journal. Later in 2013, Paulsen joined University of Lund as a docent in sociology, and to work for professor Mats Alvesson. Since then he has been active at the institution of business administration at Lund University. He primarily researches individuals' relationships to waged work and especially questions regarding why waged work takes up such a major role in peoples lives.

In 2014 Paulsen was recruited to the Swedish newspaper Dagens Nyheter, as a permanent member of its culture staff.

2015 Paulsen received his public breakthrough with his book We merely obey: A story about the public employment service (Vi bara lyder: En berättelse om Arbetsförmedlingen).

In August 2026 his book Avbegåvad (Detalented) was published.

=== Family ===
Roland is the grandson of the deceased author and EU politician Marit Paulsen, whom he writes about in his 2026 book Avbegåvad (Detalented). In the book, Marit Paulsen is portrayed as an abusive matriarch who argues that personal traits and talents are mainly genetic.

== Research and engagement in public debate ==
Roland Paulsen is active in the public debate on the topics of his research and related fields. Among other things he has explained his view on inequality and critiqued the theories of Hans Rosling. He has also co-authored Return to Meaning: A Social Science with Something to say, with professor Mats Alvesson, in which the authors address how the "publish or perish" game produces meaningless social science research that cannot address social problems and just serve to further academic tenure and promotion.

Paulsen has also put forward the, by Mats Alvesson established phenomenon, of functional stupidity which is described as "[...] the modus operandi of ego-dystonic compliance we enter in order to endure long hours of imposed work assignments we would rather not perform.".

== Criticism of the work-society ==
In 2010 Paulsen published his book Arbetssamhället – Hur arbetet överlevde teknologin (The work society - how work survived the technology), which was critical of work.

Paulsen said that he wanted to achieve a change in how we perceive work; in relation to that, the need for work itself has decreased due to the technological development.

Paulsen considers it to be a waste of resources that people's working hours haven't decreased as technology has moved forward. As well as claiming that work is increasingly losing its ability to create value. Instead, Paulsen claims that work takes on a religious function in contemporary society, and acts like a mechanism of distributing resources.

When asked why he thinks it is an important question for people who vote in political elections to create more work. Paulsen responded:

"It's an absurd idea, all politicians today want to create jobs. The only thing that is being discussed is technical aspects of how that is going to be achieved. But it is also obvious that one does not win elections by promising that there are going to be more people without any work, but the question of shortening working time has been swept under the rug completely. In the past, we worked to create growth, now we want growth to create jobs."

== Bibliography ==
- Arbetssamhället - Hur arbetet överlevde teknologin (Gleerups, 2010)
- Empty labor: Subjectivity and idleness at work (Uppsala universitet, cop. 2013)
- Empty Labor: Idleness and Workplace Resistance (Cambridge University Press, 2014)
- We merely obey: A story about the public employment service (Vi bara lyder: En berättelse om Arbetsförmedlingen) (Atlas, 2015)
- Return to Meaning: A Social Science with Something to Say (Oxford University Press, 2017) (with Mats Alvesson and Yiannis Gabriel)
- What if: a study of anxiety (Tänk om : en studie i oro) (Albert Bonniers Förlag, 2020)
- Why We Worry: A Sociological Explanation (Routledge, 2024)
- Avbegåvad (Detalented) (Albert Bonniers Förlag, 2026)

== Awards ==
- 27th International Labor Process Conference Award for best doctoral paper (2009)
- Winner of The Nordic Sociological Association Competition for Junior Sociologists (2010)
- Wallanderstipendiet from Jan Wallanders & Tom Hedelius foundation (2014)
- Johan Hansson-priset (2015)
- Natur & Kultur's debate-book price (2015)
- European Group for Organizational Studies (EGOS) book award (17 June 2017)
- The documentary Vi bara lyder (We merely obey) which is based on Paulsens work won the International Documentary Film Festival Amsterdam's price for best short documentary in 2017.
