= Wolfgang Dietrich (political scientist) =

Austrian peace researcher and political scientist

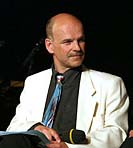
Dietrich in 2006

Wolfgang Dietrich (born 13 September 1956 in Tyrol) is an Austrian peace researcher and political scientist.

Dietrich was educated in Austria and England and received a Ph.D. in history and literature at the University of Innsbruck/Austria in 1980 and an LL.D. at the same university in 1984. In 1990 he was promoted to the degree of "Universitätsdozent" (Adjunct Professor) in Political Science according to the Austrian Law of Higher Education (UOG). In 2015, the University of Innsbruck promoted him to an Honorary Professor.

He was the chairperson of the Austrian section of Amnesty International from 1989 to 1991, director of the European Peace University from 1995 to 1998, and academic director of the Austrian Institute for Latin America from 1995 to 2007 before he committed full-time to the development of Peace Studies Innsbruck.

There, he was the founding director of the MA Program in Peace, Development, Security and International Conflict Transformation in 2001 and founder of the Innsbruck School of Peace Studies, a groundbreaking epistemological approach to peace and conflict research. In 2017 he became head of the then newly founded Unit for Peace and Conflict Studies, 2018 co-director of the Research Center for Peace and Conflict INNPEACE at the University of Innsbruck. He retired from all these positions in 2021 in the context of severe critiques. The University of Innsbruck declared in October 2021, shortly after the retirement of its chair, that despite its original name MA Program, the "Course [Lehrgang] in Peace, Development, Security and International Conflict Transformation" should be given a clearer institutional form, with a regular academic title to obtain ("Regelstudium").

He was the UNESCO Chairholder for Peace Studies and a member of the Austrian UNESCO Commission from 2008 until his retirement. Since January 2023, Rina Alluri is the new Chairholder for Peace Studies.

In 2015, the Association of the Alpine States (ARGE ALP) appointed him the peace ambassador of the Alpine Region.

Dietrich began his career as an academic peace worker in Central America and Latin America, later in India, Eastern Africa, and Southeast Asia. He worked and taught also at many Universities in the US and Europe. During the last years of his career, he worked mainly in the Middle East.

His focus is applied conflict transformation, peace philosophy, cultures of peace, and peace education.

His about 300 academic writings have been published in many also non-European languages.

== Research focus ==
Dietrich's research focuses on the history of peace studies, peace and development, peace and postmodernity, cultures of peace, theories of peace, peace and world system theory, as well as the contributions of humanistic psychology to peace studies.

The best-known and most quoted of his early contribution to peace studies is the Call for Many Peaces, published in 1998 and republished in 2006. Therein Wolfgang Dietrich dissolves the notion of a homogenous, universal peace in the plurality of the many peaces and thus establishes an approach that is founded on respect towards the Other. Peace is thus thought of in the sense of "many peaces" as a noun with a plural. He asserts that what peace means differs on closer inspection from culture to culture, and the connotations and etymological interpretations of the concept of "peace" do not coincide in different languages but are an expression of the plurality of worldviews and perceptions of the societies speaking those languages.

Since 2008 Dietrich has distinguished between the energetic, moral, modern, post-modern, and trans-rational understanding of peace. He advocates the so-called trans-rational approach, which combines the mechanistic understanding of modern peace with those cosmovisions which are energetically oriented towards the establishment and maintaining of harmonious relations between humans, nature, and the cosmos.

From there, he derives his culture-sensitive call for an elective approach to conflict transformation, following here peace researchers such as Adam Curle or John Paul Lederach. Conflict work to him means facilitating the exploration and creation of new options by the conflicting parties instead of prescriptive conflict resolution by external experts.

In his last book under the German title, Der dies Das Frieden. Nachmerkungen zur Trilogie über die vielen Frieden (2021) he developed this approach further and argues now that peace should neither be considered an abstract essence, expressed in a singular noun as all modern European languages do, nor the relational plural that he advocated until then, but as interacting dynamics of the web of existence, expressed better in verbs – as numerous extra-European languages do.

This approach has been didactically implemented and practically applied at the Innsbruck School of Peace Studies. during his time as director. Nevertheless, in relationship to the extracurricular "Course [Lehrgang] in Peace, Development, Security and International Conflict Transformation", the central university administration said, shortly after the retirement of its original chair in 2021, and in the context of some public critiques, that it better should be changed to get an institutional academic form ("Regelstudium").

This approach has been didactically implemented and practically applied at the Innsbruck School of Peace Studies during his time as director. Nevertheless, in relationship to the extracurricular "Course [Lehrgang] in Peace, Development, Security and International Conflict Transformation", the central university administration said, shortly after the retirement of its original chair in 2021, and in the context of some public criticisms, that it better should be changed to get an institutional academic form ("Regelstudium").

== Controversy ==
In October 2021, shortly after Wolfgang Dietrich's retirement, there was a public controversy at the University of Innsbruck about his controversial methods as the former head of the Innsbruck Peace course. A report by Austrian public television (ORF) on 13 October 2021, states: "The Zeit im Bild has in its power reports from several graduates and a French guest professor who speaks of extreme dependency and psychological consequences; the former course director also crossed sexual boundaries during esoteric exercises." The three graduates of the course, that have been interviewed in the television report, relate about the "mental and physical violence" practiced there, and on the experience that Wolfgang Dietrich "sat right next to me and (began) to tell me something about my sexuality, it was a completely offensive, uncomfortable situation." As a result, occurred "depression" and "suicidal thoughts," that the graduate student had not known before.

At the same time, a group of around 100 Peace Studies alumni spontaneously formed, who found the accusations outrageous and prepared to go public with counter-statements, which only did not happen so as not to hinder the university's ongoing investigations.

Due to these allegations, the management of the University of Innsbruck wrote to everyone who had completed the course in the last 20 years and asked those affected to come forward. According to the university, no evidence of sexualized assaults emerged from this call, nor had there been any indications of structural violence. However, the university's vice-rector for human resources acknowledged during a media briefing that there were indications from third parties that Dietrich was privately close and verbally insensitive.

An independent investigation of these allegations, with external professional support, specialized in psychological and sexual harassment, as proposed in a similar case at the University of Salzburg, never took place: the management of the University of Innsbruck, criticized for the role it did play, investigated and acquitted himself.

== Selected bibliography ==
- Der die das Frieden. Nachbemerkung zur Trilogie über die vielen Frieden, Wiesbaden, Springer VS, 2021.
- Conviviality, Ego, Team and Theme Behavior in Transrational Peace Education in: Journal of Peace Education 16:3 (2019) Transrational Perspectives in Peace Education. pp. 252–273 [Taylor and Francis Online]
- Elicitive Conflict Mapping, London, Palgrave Macmillan, 2018.
- Elicitive Conflict Transformation and the Transrational Shift in Peace Politics , London, Palgrave Macmillan, 2013.
- Interpretations of Peace in History and Culture, London, Palgrave Macmillan, 2012.
- (Ed.): The Palgrave International Handbook of Peace Studies: A Cultural Perspective, London, Palgrave Macmillan, 2011.
- (Ed.): Schlüsseltexte der Friedensforschung/Key Texts of Peace Studies/Textos claves de estudios para la paz, Wien, LIT Verlag, 2006.
- Farewell to the One Peace, in: Peace Review, Journal of Social Justice, San Francisco, Volume 14/1, 2002.
