= Community of Christ International Peace Award =

Peace award given by the Community of Christ

The Community of Christ International Peace Award was established to honor and bring attention to the work of peacemaking and peacemakers in the world. It has been bestowed on an individual each year since 1993 (except 1996, 2015, 2017, 2018, and 2020 to 2022).

== Overview ==
The award was instituted as part of the peace and justice ministries associated with the Independence Temple, which was dedicated in 1994, the year following the inaugural award. The Community of Christ International Peace Award includes a cash gift for the benefit of the recipient's project or endeavor.

The Community of Christ International Peace Award has been given annually (with the exception of 1996, 2015, 2017, and 2018) since 1993 at Community of Christ World Headquarters during significant events, including the annual Peace Colloquy, the biennial World Conference, and the International Youth Forum (held every four years). The cash value of the Community of Christ International Peace Award ranks among the top 20 international, non-governmental peace awards in the world (in a list topped by the Nobel Peace Prize) and among the top seven in the United States. As of 2006, the award includes $20,000 for the recipient to donate to a charity of his or her choice.

Recipients represent diversity in terms of ethnicity, gender, and faith. The Community of Christ International Peace Award honor roll includes Craig Kielburger, Rev. James Lawson, Jean Vanier, Ela Gandhi, Swanee Hunt, John Paul Lederach, Jane Goodall, Marie Fortune, Juan M. Flavier, Marian Wright Edelman, M. Scott Peck and Lily Peck, and Jehan Sadat.

2005 recipient Craig Kielburger, founder of Free the Children, stated in his acceptance address that: "It is an honour to receive this commendation from an organization with such a long and acclaimed history as champions for international peace and justice. The Community of Christ has been a social-justice advocate since its early beginnings among the poor on the USA frontier in the 1830s. Your movement began with young people; Joseph Smith Jr. was only fourteen when he had his first vision, only twenty-four when he began your church. Today an international movement in over fifty nations, Community of Christ carries the torch forward through child advocacy, campaigns to support conscientious objection to war, and in their fight to bring recognition to the crisis in Darfur, Sudan."

Accepting the award in 2004, Rev. James Lawson said: "You can resolve the war in your own life. You can resolve the war in your community, your congregation. You can heal the war in our nation. We can make war a relic of a dead past that need never again threaten the well-being and the security of the human race."

== Honorees ==
Year	Individual(s)
1993	Dr. Jehan Sadat
1994	Dr. M. Scott Peck and Lily Ho Peck
1995	Marian Wright Edelman
1996	No award
1997	Senator Juan M. Flavier of the Philippines
1998	Rev. Dr. Marie Fortune, founder of FaithTrust Institute
1999	Dr. Jane Goodall
2000	Dr. John Paul Lederach
2001	Dr. Swanee Hunt
2002	Ms. Ela Gandhi, MP, ANC, South Africa
2003	Dr. Jean Vanier (revoked)
2004	Rev. James Lawson
2005	Craig Kielburger
2006	Dr. Howard Zehr
2007	Dolores Huerta and Virgilio Elizondo
2008	Koinonia Partners
2009	Dr. Halima Bashir
2010	Greg Mortenson
2011	Terry Tempest Williams
2012	Tadatoshi Akiba
2013	John L. Bell
2014	Bread for the World
2015	No award
2016	Leymah Gbowee
2017	No award
2018	No award
2019	Gary White and Sister Andrea Kantner
2020	No award
2021	No award
2022	No award
2023	Community Peacemaker Teams
