= An Agenda for Peace =

1992 report by UN Secretary-General Boutros Boutros-Ghali

An Agenda for Peace: Preventive diplomacy, peacemaking and peace-keeping, more commonly known simply as An Agenda for Peace, is a report written for the United Nations by Secretary-General Boutros Boutros-Ghali in 1992. In it, Boutros-Ghali responds to a request by the UN Security Council for an "analysis and recommendations" to strengthen peacemaking and peace-keeping. The document outlines the way Boutros-Ghali felt the UN should respond to conflict in the post-Cold War world.

Recognizing the limitations of peacekeeping, especially as such efforts were becoming prevalent in the early 1990s, the UN Security Council convened in 1992 in a first-time meeting of heads of state. The 15 members finished the conference by issuing a statement calling on then-Secretary-General Boutros Boutros-Ghali to write a report recommending future reforms. In their statement, the heads-of-state recognized that,

The absence of war and military conflicts amongst States does not in itself ensure international peace and security. The non-military sources of instability in the economic, social, humanitarian and ecological fields have become threats to peace and security. The United Nations membership as a whole, working through the appropriate bodies, needs to give the highest priority to the solution of these matters.

The Security Council saw what many critics of peacekeeping have suggested, and some recent failures had made obvious: peacekeeping alone, as then practiced, was not enough to ensure lasting peace.

Boutros-Ghali submitted his response some months later, in the form of An Agenda for Peace. In it, he outlined a number of additional processes of preventative diplomacy the international community could use before peacekeeping, or simultaneously. He also suggested distinct definitions for peacemaking and peacekeeping, and referenced Chapter VII of the United Nations Charter to justify military involvement without the consent of both parties. Previously, these concepts had not been formally addressed by the UN's leadership. However, An Agenda for Peace’s most significant contribution to the modern understanding of peace is its introduction of the concept of "post-conflict peacebuilding." Boutros-Ghali defines "post-conflict peace-building" as "action to identify and support structures which will tend to strengthen and solidify peace in order to avoid a relapse into conflict."

The concept of post-conflict peacebuilding has been especially important in the academic discipline of peace and conflict studies. It has been adopted by a number of scholars to suggest a framework for peace that addresses not only the latent forms of physical violence, but also aspects of a society that are structurally violent, and could lead to a re-emergence of fighting (see the discussion of positive peace in the article on peace and conflict studies).

== See also ==
- Peace enforcement
