= Innsbruck School of Peace Studies =

The Innsbruck School of Peace Studies was developed by Wolfgang Dietrich and his team at the University of Innsbruck, Austria from 2001. In 2008 the UNESCO Chair for Peace Studies was established. In 2017 the team of rectors founded the Unit for Peace and Conflict Studies at the Faculty for Social and Political Sciences and transferred it to the Faculty for Humanities in 2019. Finally, in 2018 the Research Center for Peace and Conflict INNPEACE was founded as a transdisciplinary research initiative of academics from nine very different institutes. Together they form the so-called Innsbruck School of Peace Studies.

Following Dietrich's retirement amid controversy over allegations of sexual misconduct, the Innsbruck School of Peace Studies is no longer active at the University of Innsbruck. Peace studies at the university has since shifted its focus toward feminist, decolonial, and practical approaches to peace.

== Research and publications ==
The Innsbruck School of Peace Studies became famous for its unique approach with the key phrase “transrational peaces” and with its specific and tough training method in the sense of John Paul Lederach's elicitive conflict transformation. Both principles are applied in practice and developed further in the frame of the MA Program for Peace Studies. The UNESCO Chair promotes further research in these fields, and the publication of the respective results.

Norbert Koppensteiner, a Dietrich student and former program coordinator at the MA Program in Peace, Development, Security and International Conflict Transformation, is another important representative of the Innsbruck School of Peace Studies. In his book The Art of the Transpersonal Self he draws on findings of humanistic and transpersonal psychology. His work can be seen as a critique of some of modernity's founding principles like truth. Koppensteiner argues that the autonomous and self grounded subject, morals or solvability of conflicts have become sites of contestation and debate. He suggests to re-think some of those categories being debated in (post)modernity by invoking transpersonal and transrational transpositions. Asking about the continued possibilities for subjectivation, Koppensteiner sketches the outlines of an art of living for a subjectivity perceived as constantly emergent and in transformation, a subjectivity that embraces conflict as part of its transpersonal relational becoming, and that emerges through an ongoing transformation of the self-understood as an aesthetic (Apollonian) and energetic (Dionysian) practice. The strictly relational understanding of peace and conflict that Koppensteiner proposes is one of the central ontological assumptions of the Innsbruck School of Peace Studies. This has been further elaborated by Koppensteiner in his recent book published by Palgrave Macmillan, 2020.

Other important representatives of the Innsbruck School of Peace Studies are Josefina Echavarría, the former Research and Publications Coordinator who moved to the Kroc Institute for International Peace Studies, Daniela Ingruber, Jennifer Murphy, Andreas Oberprantacher, Noah Taylor, Paula Ditzel Facci, Shawn Bryant and Catalina Vallejo. Each academic year leading international scholars of Peace and Conflict Studies visit the MA Program at the University of Innsbruck.

=== Transrational Peace Philosophy ===
The Innsbruck School of Peace Studies is based on Wolfgang Dietrich's transrational approach to Peace Studies and is outlined in his Many Peaces Trilogy. Spanning continents as well as disciplines, Dietrich presents diverse interpretations of peace in world history and culture. Dietrich outlines the so-called five families of peace - energetic, moral, modern, post-modern and trans-rational. He stresses the importance of combining rationality and reason with human properties such as emotion and spirituality in applied peace work. This ontological assumption indicates a paradigm shift and proposes a new epistemological understanding of peace, which is at the heart of the Innsbruck School's peace philosophy.

=== Elicitive Conflict Transformation ===
Elicitive Conflict Transformation was first introduced to the field by John Paul Lederach in 1995 and is the applied method of transrational peace philosophy. Drawing on the debate on multi-track diplomacy, Lederach initially distinguished between three levels of conflict:

1. Top Leaders
2. Middle-Range Leaders
3. Grassroots

Wolfgang Dietrich draws on Lederach's systemic approach to conflict and developed a multi-layered model of conflict analysis. Furthermore, he systematizes elective conflict transformation techniques in three main groups:

1. Voice-oriented approaches to conflict transformation; e.g. non-violent communication after Marshall Rosenberg and Theme-Centered Interaction after Ruth Cohn.
2. Body-oriented approaches to conflict transformation; e.g. Theatre for Living after David Diamond, Butho- and Five Rhythms Dance, after Gabrielle Roth
3. Breath-oriented approaches to conflict transformation; e.g. Holotropic Breathwork after Stanislav Grof and Sylvester Walch.

All three types of approaches to conflict share a strong reference to systems theory and hence a strictly relational understanding of conflicts.

== Unit for Peace and Conflict Studies ==
In January 2017 the Unit for Peace and Conflict Studies was inaugurated. It consists of the UNESCO Chair for Peace Studies, which is the rooftop for a large number of research and cooperation projects and the MA Program in Peace, Development, Security and International Conflict Transformation. Also, the 2018 founded Research Center for Peace and Conflict INNPEACE is coordinated from here. Since the retirement of Wolfgang Dietrich in 2021, Rina Alluri is the new Head of the Unit.

=== UNESCO Chair for Peace Studies ===
The UNESCO Chair for Peace Studies at the University of Innsbruck was established in June 2008 as a consequence of the systematic research on the interpretations of peaces and the unique approach to peace studies as developed by Innsbruck's MA program for Peace Studies since 2001. The agreement has been signed between UNESCO, represented by its Director-General Koichiro Matsuura, and the University of Innsbruck, represented by its rector Karlheinz Töchterle. Wolfgang Dietrich was the UNESCO Chairholder for Peace Studies in Innsbruck from 2008 until his retirement. Since January 2023, Rina Alluri is the new Chairholder for Peace Studies.

In light of the results achieved and confirmed by the positive evaluation of the report on its activities, UNESCO renewed in February 2015 and June 2019 the 2008 agreement concerning the UNESCO Chair for Peace Studies at the University of Innsbruck until June 2023.

According to the agreement, the main purposes of the UNESCO Chair are:

1. the promotion of an integrated system of research, training, information and documentation in the field of peace studies;
2. the facilitation of collaboration between high-level, internationally recognized researchers and teaching staff of the University and other institutions in Austria, Europe and North America, and other regions of the world;
3. the reinforcement of the existing network of cooperating partners through further regional, as well as international, cooperation;
4. the enhancement and complement of the already existing online teaching methods;
5. the exchange of professors, researchers, and students with other universities within the framework of UNITWIN/UNESCO Chairs Programme.

=== The MA Program in Peace, Development, Security and International Conflict Studies ===
Founded in 2001, the MA Program in Peace, Development, Security and International Conflict Transformation has become a Master's Program, training Peace and Conflict Studies scholars and Conflict Workers. In its didactical approach, the program follows a relational approach to conflict of elective conflict transformation, which is conveyed to the students in theory and practice. After the successful completion of an MA thesis students are awarded the academic title Master of Arts (120 ECTS Credit Points).

By October 2021, the Innsbruck Peace Studies program appeared in critical public debate, first in the Austrian Broadcasting Company (ORF) and then in the Tiroler Tageszeitung, resulting in a press conference, given by the central university administration, in which they declared that the peace studies, despite it baing called an MA Programm, was not an official MA Program of the Innsbruck University, but only an extracurricular continuing education Program for Peace, Development, Security and International Conflict Transformation [außerordentlicher Lehrgang für Frieden, Entwicklung, Sicherheit und internationale Konflikttransformation], that should be soon transformed into a regular curricular study program with a university degree [in ein Regelstudium überführt]. In Fall 2022, the program successfully transitioned to become a regular Masters Program at the University of Innsbruck, enabling it to be better integrated into the University.

=== Unit for Peace Studies Alumni Network ===
Established in 2008, a vast amount of alumni initiatives have emerged within the active network of graduates from the MA Program in Peace and Conflict Studies.

==== Many Peaces Magazine ====
The Many Peaces Magazine was conceptualized and launched in 2014 by Adham Hamed, Mayme Lefurgey, Paul Lauer and Isabelle Guibert. It was created as an outlet to showcase the work of alumni, students, cooperation partners and friends of the Master of Arts Program in Peace, Development, Security and International Conflict Transformation and the UNESCO Chair for Peace Studies located at Universität Innsbruck, Austria. The magazine is published twice a year, in January and July of each year. The Many Peaces Magazine team has changed and developed over the past volumes and is currently coordinated by a team spread out over three continents and features authors and stories from around the globe. Many of the articles, stories and contributions that can be found in the magazine relate to the field of Peace Studies in some way, but more specifically to the fields of Transrational Peace Philosophy and Elicitive Conflict Transformation.

==== Peace Studies Fund e.V. ====
An alumni run initiative raising funds for scholarships for peace and conflict studies scholars from the Global South.

==== Many Peaces e.V. ====
An alumni run initiative organizing workshops on applied methods of elicitive conflict transformation, as developed at the Innsbruck School of Peace Studies.

== Controversy ==
In October 2021, shortly after Wolfgang Dietrich's retirement, there was a public controversy at the University of Innsbruck about his controversial methods as the former head of the Innsbruck Peace course. A report by Austrian public television (ORF) on 13 October 2021, states: "The Zeit im Bild has in its power reports from several graduates and a French guest professor who speaks of extreme dependency and psychological consequences; the former course director also crossed sexual boundaries during esoteric exercises." The three graduates of the course, that have been interviewed in the television report, relate about the "mental and physical violence" practiced there, and on the experience that Wolfgang Dietrich "sat right next to me and (began) to tell me something about my sexuality, it was a completely offensive, uncomfortable situation." As a result, occurred "depression" and "suicidal thoughts," that the graduate student had not known before.

At the same time, a group of around 100 Peace Studies alumni spontaneously formed, who found the accusations outrageous and prepared to go public with counter-statements, which only did not happen so as not to hinder the university's ongoing investigations.

Due to these allegations, the management of the University of Innsbruck wrote to everyone who had completed the course in the last 20 years and asked those affected to come forward. According to the university, no evidence of sexualized assaults emerged from this call, nor had there been any indications of structural violence. However, the university's vice-rector for human resources acknowledged during a media briefing that there were indications from third parties that Dietrich was privately close and verbally insensitive.

An independent investigation of these allegations, with external professional support, specialized in psychological and sexual harassment, as proposed in a similar case at the University of Salzburg, never took place: the management of the University of Innsbruck, criticized for the role it did play, investigated and acquitted himself.
