= Per Olof Berg =

Swedish business theorist

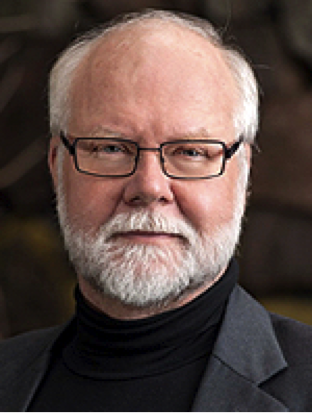
- Born: July 17, 1946 (age 79); Strängnäs, Sweden
- Occupation: Professor
- Spouse: Guje Sevón (m. 1999)

Per Olof Berg (born July 17, 1946) is a Swedish organizational theorist and professor of business administration, known for his work on corporate culture and organizational symbolism.

== Biography ==
Berg was born in Strängnäs, Sweden. He first trained as an engineer in industrial electronics at Västerås Technical Gymnasium, completed his military service in Uppsala, and later earned an MSc in Business Administration from Lund University in 1970. He obtained his PhD in Business Administration from the same university in 1979.

After completing his doctorate, Berg was promoted to "docent" (associate professor) at Lund university in 1986. He worked at the Department of Business Administration from 1971, initially as a research assistant, then as an assistant professor between 1979 and 1985, before becoming an associate professor in 1986.

In 1990, he was appointed professor of strategic management at Copenhagen Business School (CBS), where he founded the "Scandinavian Academy of Management Studies" (SAMS). From 1995, he served as head of the Department of Management, Politics and Philosophy (MPP).

In 2000, Berg was recruited to Stockholm to lead the development of the Stockholm School of Entrepreneurship (SSES). He left the position in 2005 to become professor of marketing at the Stockholm Business School (SBS) at Stockholm University. After his retirement in 2013, he was reappointed as senior professor.

Per Olof Berg has also been visiting professor at INSEAD ("Institut Européen d'Administration des Affaires") and ISTUD (Istituto Studi Direzionali). He has been a visiting scholar at Stanford Graduate School of Business, UCLA, University of Auckland Business School, University of Technology Sydney, University of Siena, and Stellenbosch Business School.

Since 1999, Berg is married to Professor Guje Sevón. The couple lives in Strängnäs, Sweden.

== Work ==
Per Olof Berg has played an active role in developing international networks of researchers, serving as chair of the Standing Conference on Organizational Symbolism (SCOS) , and as a founding board member of European Academy of Management (EURAM).

In addition to his academic work, Berg has served as strategic advisor to companies, public agencies, and non-profit organizations and has held board positions in consulting firms, media organizations and educational institutions. From 2021-2024, he was president of the Swedish Academy of Culinary Art and Meal Science, after which he assumed the role of chair of the Scientific Committee at the International Academy of Gastronomy in 2024.

== Selected publications ==
- Berg, P. O. (1979) Emotional Structures in Organizations: A Study of the Process of Change in a Swedish Company, PhD thesis. Lund: Studentlitteratur.
- Alvesson, M. & Berg, P. O. (1992) Corporate Culture and Organizational Symbolism: An Overview, Berlin: de Gruyter.
- Berg, P.O. & Björner, E. (2014) Branding Chinese Mega Cities: Policies, practices and positioning, Cheltenham, Edvard Elgar Publishing.

Articles, a selection:

- Berg, P. O. (1985) "Organization Change as a Symbolic Transformation Process." In P. J. Frost, L. F. Moore, M. R. Louis, C. C. Lundberg and J. Martin: Organizational Culture, Beverly Hills, CA: Sage.
- Berg, P. O. (1986) "Symbolic Management of Human Resources." Human Resource Management. 25 (4), 557-579.
- Berg, P. O. (2003) "Magic in Action: Strategic Management in a New Economy." In: Barbara Czarniawska & Guje Sevón. The Northern Lights: Organization Theory in Scandinavia, Malmö: Liber.
- Lucarelli, A. & Berg, P. O. (2011) City branding: a state-of-the-art review of the research domain, Journal of Place Management and Development, 4(1), 9-27.
