= Marit Paulsen =

Norwegian-born Swedish politician (1939–2022)

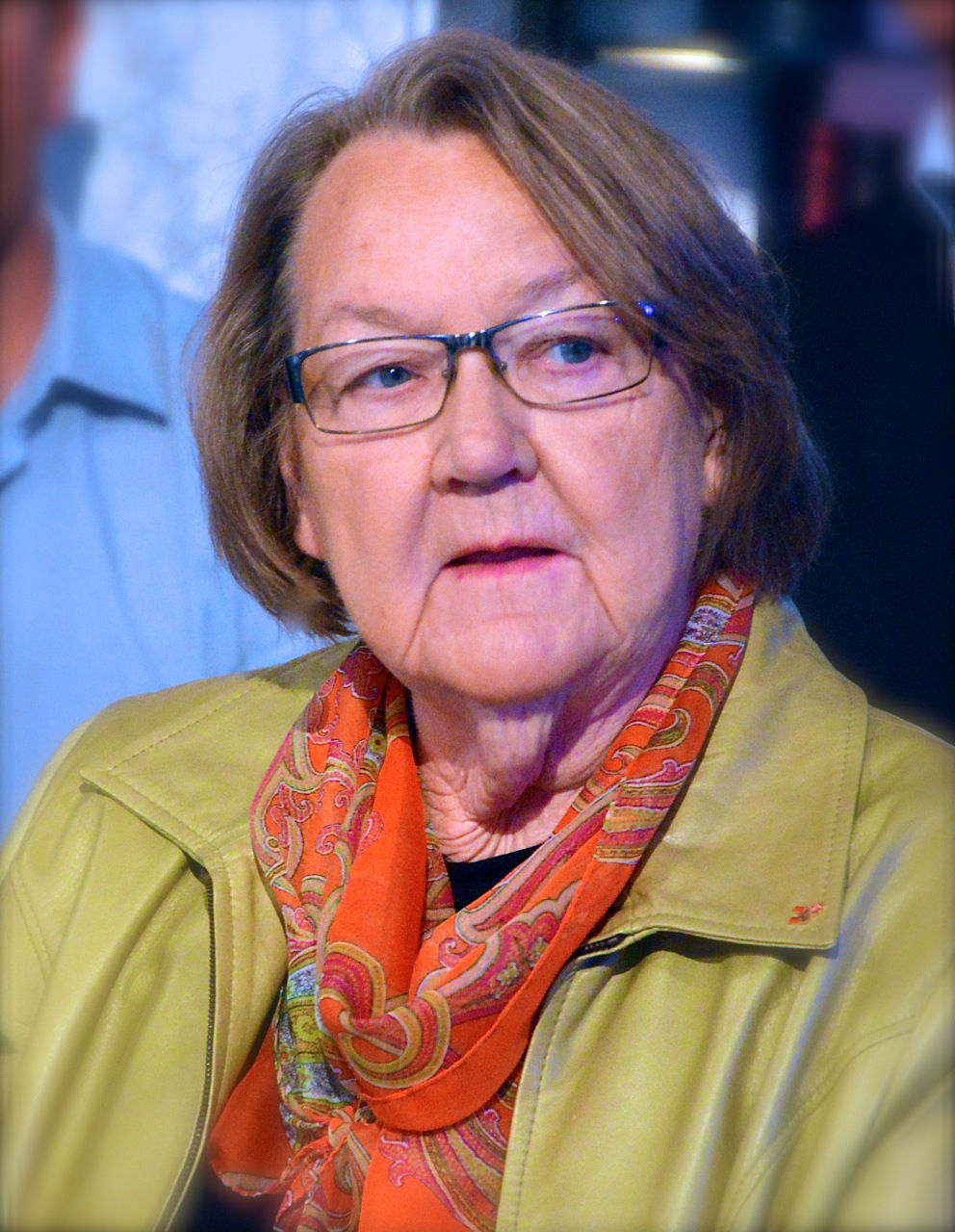
- Paulsen in 2014

Member of the European Parliament
- In office 20 July 1999 – 19 July 2004

Member of the European Parliament
- In office 14 July 2009 – 29 September 2015

Personal details
- Born: 24 November 1939 Oslo, Norway
- Died: 25 July 2022 (aged 82)
- Party: Liberals; Swedish Social Democratic Party
- Occupation: Journalist, author, politician

Marit Eli Paulsen (née Bjørnerud; 24 November 1939 – 25 July 2022) was a Norwegian-born Swedish journalist, author and politician for the Liberals. She was a Member of the European Parliament (MEP) from 1999 to 2004 and from 2009 to 2015. She was a well-known figure in the Swedish public debate on environmental and food quality issues, initially as a non-partisan, and was an avid proponent of Swedish membership in the European Union during the EU membership referendum campaign in 1994.

== Biography ==
She grew up in Oslo, which was occupied by Germany during much of her earliest childhood. Two of her elder siblings were active in the youth wing of Nasjonal Samling.

She moved to Sweden in the 1960s and worked at the steel mill in Smedjebacken for seven years. She went through a two-year Folk high school education in 1970–72.

In 1998 she joined the Liberal People's Party, and served as 2nd Vice President of the party from 1999 to 2007. In the 2009 European Parliament elections, she was elected to the European Parliament as the top candidate of the list. She gained more personal votes than any other Swedish candidate.

Paulsen has written more than 20 books, including novels and non-fiction about environmental protection and other societal issues. Her debut novel, Du människa? (published in 1972), describes the life of a female shift worker. Her book Liten Ida (1979) is a semi-autobiographical novel set in Norway during the German occupation; it was made into a movie in 1980.

== Personal life ==
Paulsen was married to her second husband, Sture Andersson, since 1973, and had 10 children including biological children, step children and adopted children. She lived on a farm in Yttermalung, Dalarna.

Paulsen died on 25 July 2022, at the age of 82.

In a 2026 book, Avbegåvad (Detalented) her grandson, author and sociologist Roland Paulsen, portrays her as an abusive matriarch.
