= Sarah J. Tracy =

American communication scholar

Sarah J. Tracy is an organizational communication scholar and full professor in Arizona State University’s Hugh Downs School of Human Communication.

Tracy earned a B.A. in 1993 from the University of Southern California, and received her Master of Arts and Ph.D. degrees in communication from the University of Colorado at Boulder, where she was advised by Stanley A. Deetz. While at Colorado, she became a co-author with Deetz and Jennifer Lyn Simpson of the book Leading Organizations through Transition: Communication and Cultural Change (Sage Publications, 1999, ISBN 978-0761920977). Her doctoral thesis on Emotional labor and correctional officers: A study of emotion norms, performance and unintended consequences in a total institution (2000) won the National Communication Association's Miller Dissertation Award. She joined the ASU faculty in 2000.

Dr. Tracy's communication scholarship examines emotion and identity within organizations, with a focus on workplace bullying, emotional labor, occupational burnout, and work-life balance. Through the use of qualitative research, such as participant observation, in-depth interviewing, focus groups, and discourse analysis, her ethnographic studies investigate targets of workplace bullying, male executives, correctional officers, 911 emergency call-takers, public relations professionals, and cruise ship activity coordinators. Tracy designs and conducts her research in an attempt to provide new information and knowledge that can potentially improve organizational environments and the everyday lives of men and women.
