= Peace and conflict studies =

Field in social science

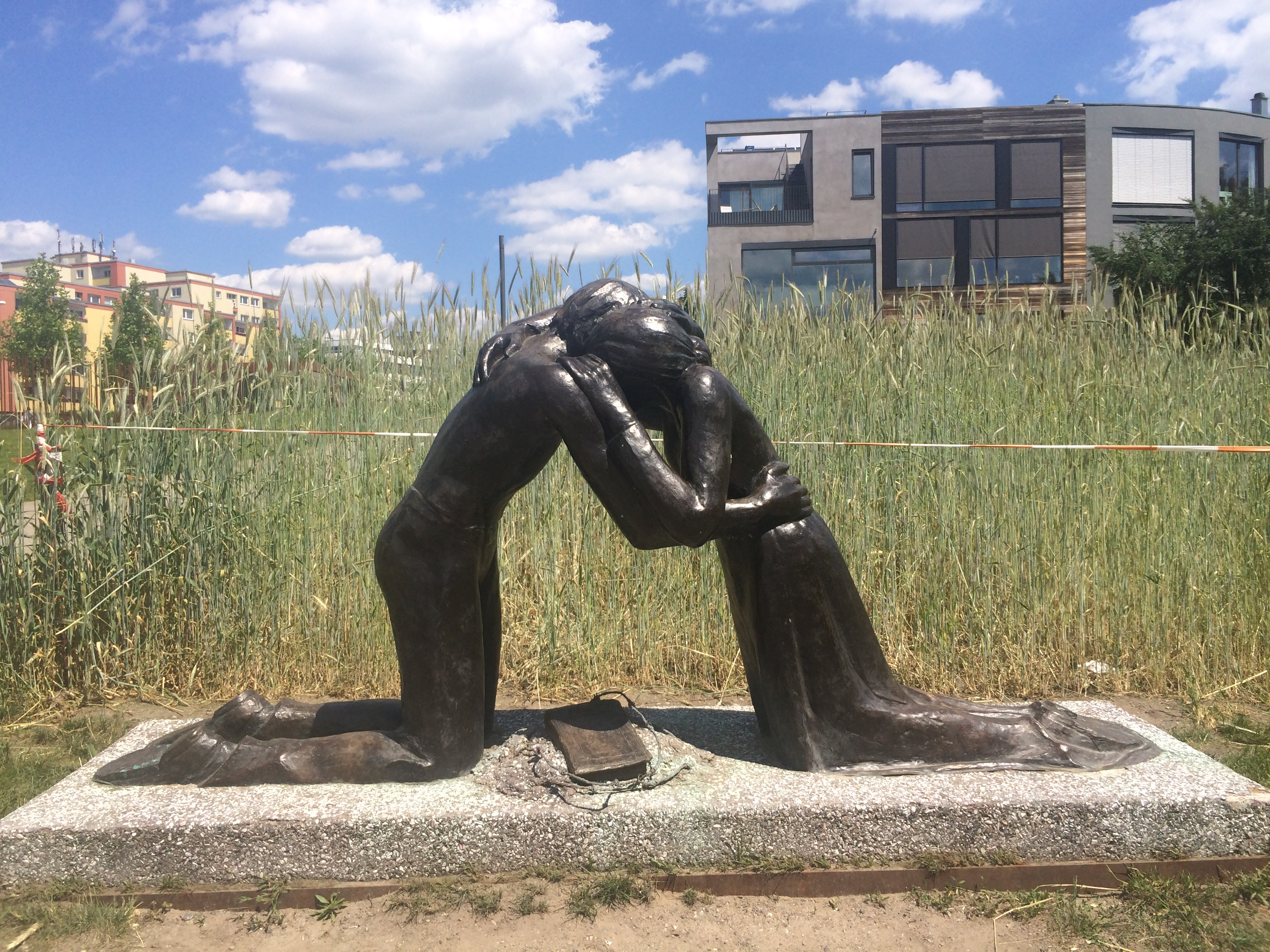
Copy of the sculpture Reconciliation by Josefina de Vasconcellos (1977), initially presented to the Bradford University Department of Peace Studies, located in front of the Chapel of Reconciliation at the former site of the Berlin Wall

Peace and conflict studies is a field of social science that identifies and analyses violent and nonviolent behaviours as well as the structural mechanisms attending conflicts (including social conflicts), to understand those processes which lead to a more desirable human condition. A variation on this, peace studies, is an interdisciplinary effort aiming at the prevention, de-escalation, and solution of conflicts by peaceful means, based on achieving conflict resolution and dispute resolution at the international and domestic levels based on positive sum, rather than negative sum, solutions.

In contrast with strategic studies or war studies, which focus on traditionally realist objectives based on the state or individual unit level of analysis, peace and conflict studies often focuses on the structural violence, social or human levels of analysis.

Disciplines involved may include philosophy, geography, economics, psychology, communication studies, sociology, international relations, history, anthropology, religious studies, gender studies, law, and development studies as well as a variety of others. Relevant sub-disciplines of such fields, such as peace economics, may also be regarded as belonging to peace and conflict studies. The study of peace is also known as irenology.

== Historical background ==
Peace and conflict studies is both a pedagogical activity, in which teachers transmit knowledge to students; and a research activity, in which researchers create new knowledge about the sources of conflict. Peace and conflict studies entails understanding the concept of peace which is defined as condition that ensures justice and social stability through formal and informal institutions, practices, and norms.

== As pedagogical activity ==
Academics and students in the world's oldest universities have long been motivated by an interest in peace. American student interest in what we today think of as peace studies first appeared in the form of campus clubs at United States colleges in the years immediately following the American Civil War. Similar movements appeared in Sweden in the last years of the 19th century, as elsewhere soon after. These were student-originated discussion groups, not formal courses included in college curricula. The first known peace studies course in higher education was offered in 1888 at Swarthmore College, a Quaker school.

Introduction of peace

The First World War was a turning point in Western attitudes to war. At the 1919 Peace of Paris—where the leaders of France, Britain, and the United States, led by Georges Clemenceau, David Lloyd George, and Woodrow Wilson respectively, met to decide the future of Europe—Wilson proposed his famous Fourteen Points for peacemaking. These included breaking up European empires into nation states and the establishment of the League of Nations. These moves, intended to ensure a peaceful future, were the background to a number of developments in the emergence of Peace and Conflict Studies as an academic discipline. The founding of the first chair in International Relations at Aberystwyth University, Wales, whose remit was partly to further the cause of peace, occurred in 1919.

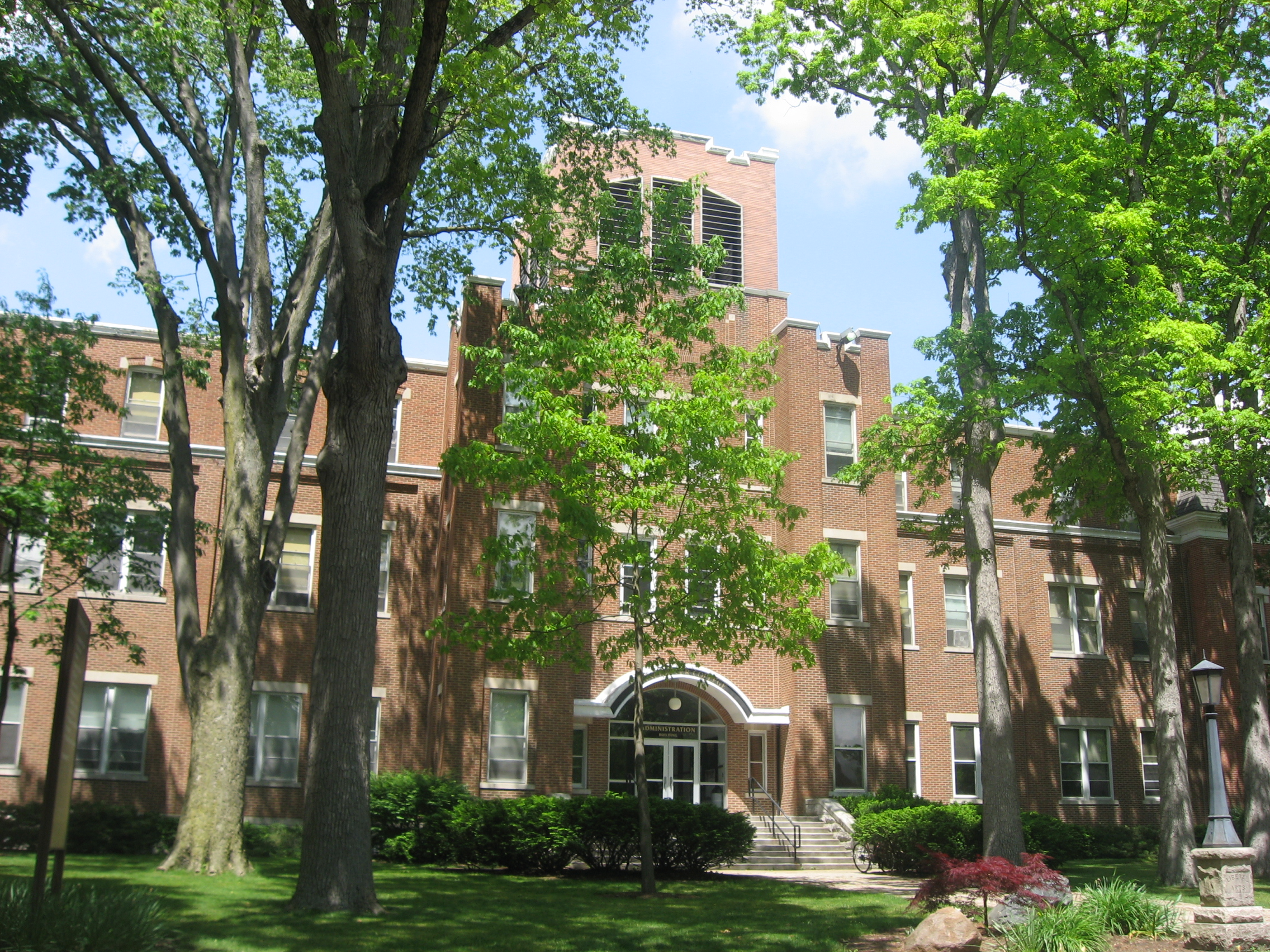
Indiana's Manchester College was one of the first institutions to offer a major in peace studies.

After World War II, the founding of the UN system provided a further stimulus for more rigorous approaches to peace and conflict studies to emerge. Many university courses in schools of higher learning around the world began to develop which touched upon questions of peace, often in relation to war, during this period. The first undergraduate academic program in peace studies in the United States was developed in 1948 by Gladdys Muir, at Manchester University a liberal arts college associated with the Church of the Brethren. It was not until the late 1960s in the United States that student concerns about the Vietnam War forced ever more universities to offer courses about peace, whether in a designated peace studies course or as a course within a traditional major. Work by academics such as Johan Galtung and John Burton, and debates in fora such as the Journal of Peace Research in the 1960s reflected the growing interest and academic stature of the field. Growth in the number of peace studies programs around the world was to accelerate during the 1980s, as students became more concerned about the prospects of nuclear war. As the Cold War ended, peace and conflict studies courses shifted their focus from international conflict and towards complex issues related to violence, human security, democratisation, human rights, social justice, welfare, development, and producing sustainable forms of peace. A proliferation of international organisations, agencies and international NGOs, from the UN, Organization for Security and Co-operation in Europe, European Union, and World Bank to International Crisis Group, International Alert, and others, began to draw on such research.

Critical theory agendas relating to positive peace in European academic contexts were already widely debated in the 1960s. By the mid-1990s peace studies curricula in the United States had shifted "...from research and teaching about negative peace, the cessation of violence, to positive peace, the conditions that eliminate the causes of violence." As a result, the topics had broadened enormously. By 1994, a review of course offerings in peace studies included topics such as: "north-south relations"; "development, debt, and global poverty"; "the environment, population growth, and resource scarcity"; and "feminist perspectives on peace, militarism, and violence".

There is now a general consensus on the importance of peace and conflict studies among scholars from a range of disciplines in and around the social sciences, as well as from many influential policymakers around the world. Peace and conflict studies today is widely researched and taught in a large and growing number of institutions and locations. The number of universities offering peace and conflict studies courses is hard to estimate, mostly because courses may be taught out of different departments and have very different names. The International Peace Research Association website gives one of the most authoritative listings available. A 2008 report in the International Herald Tribune mentions over 400 programs of teaching and research in peace and conflict studies, noting in particular those at the United World Colleges, Peace Research Institute Oslo, Universitat Jaume I in Castellón de la Plana/Spain, the Malmö University of Sweden, the American University, University of Bradford, the UN mandated Peace University UPEACE in Ciudad Colón/Costa Rica, George Mason University, Lund University, University of Michigan, Notre Dame, University of Queensland, Uppsala University, Innsbruck School of Peace Studies/Austria, University of Virginia, and University of Wisconsin. The Rotary Foundation and the UN University supports several international academic teaching and research programs.

A 1995 survey found 136 United States colleges with peace studies programs: "Forty-six percent of these are in church-related schools, another 32% are in large public universities, 21% are in non-church related private colleges, and 1% are in community colleges. Fifty-five percent of the church-related schools that have peace studies programs are Roman Catholic. Other denominations with more than one college or university with a peace studies program are the Quakers, Mennonites, Church of the Brethren, and United Church of Christ. One hundred fifteen of these programs are at the undergraduate level and 21 at the graduate level. Fifteen of these colleges and universities had both undergraduate and graduate programs."

Other notable programs can be found at the University of Toronto, Payap University, University of Manitoba, Lancaster University, Hiroshima University, University of Innsbruck, Universitat Jaume I, University of Sydney, University of Queensland, King's College (London), Sault College, London Metropolitan, Sabanci, Marburg, Sciences Po, Université Paris Dauphine University of Amsterdam, Otago, St Andrews, Brandeis University's Heller School and York. Perhaps most importantly, such programs and research agendas have now become common in institutions located in conflict, post-conflict, and developing countries and regions such as (e.g., National Peace Council), Centre for Human Rights, University of Sarajevo, Chulalongkorn University, National University of East Timor, University of Kabul, on 11 September 2014 University of peshawar, the provincial capital of Khyber Pakhtunkhwa province in Pakistan established an Institute with prime objective of offering peace education to the youth who suffered it most since 1979 Afghan war. It is called Institute of Peace and Conflict Studies (IPCS).

== As research activity ==
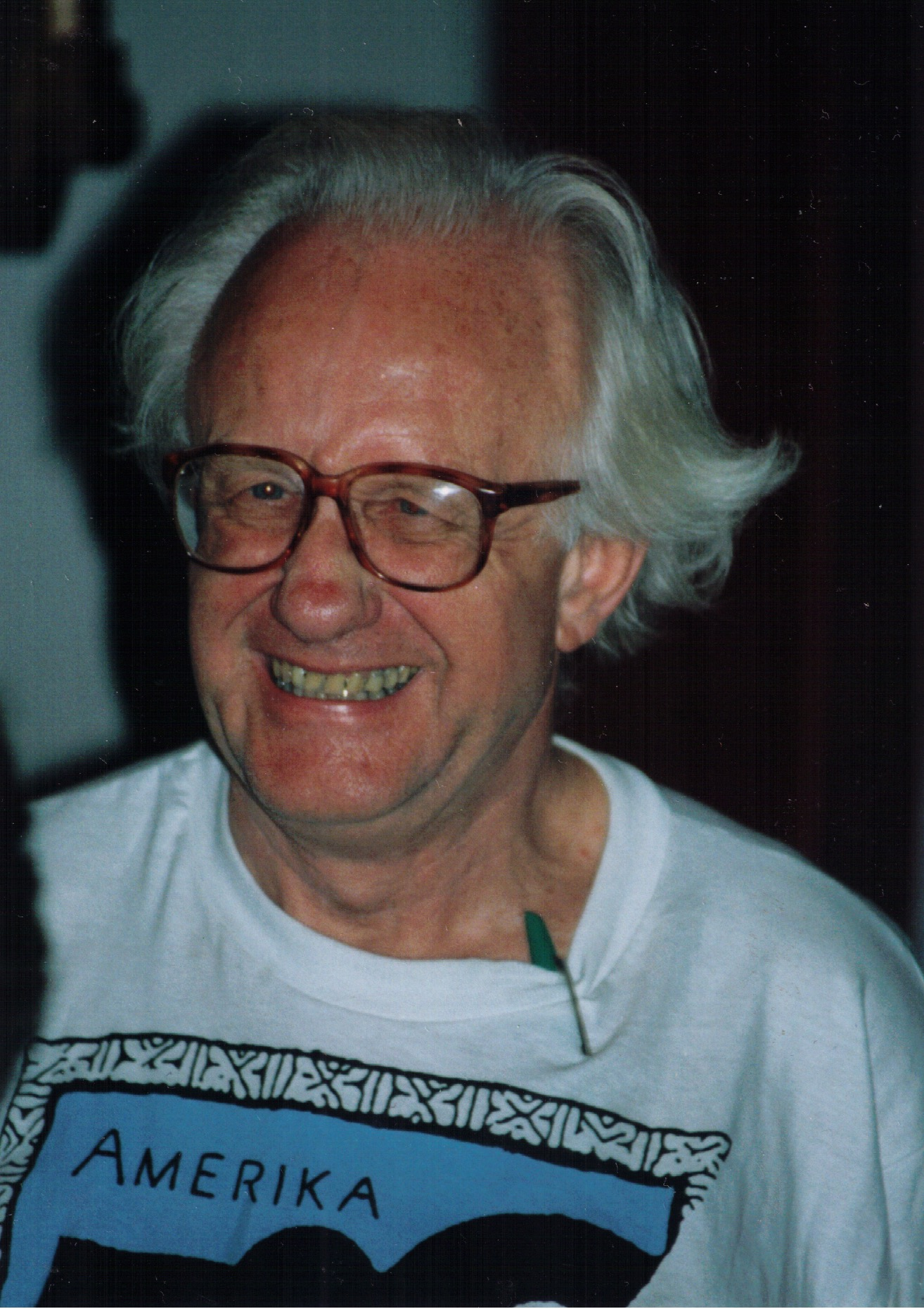
Norwegian academic Johan Galtung is widely regarded as a founder of peace and conflict studies.

Although individual thinkers such as Immanuel Kant had long recognized the centrality of peace (see Perpetual Peace), it was not until the 1950s and 1960s that peace studies began to emerge as an academic discipline with its own research tools, a specialized set of concepts, and forums for discussion such as journals and conferences. Beginning in 1959, with the founding of the Peace Research Institute Oslo (PRIO), associated with Johan Galtung, a number of research institutes began to appear.

In 1963, Walter Isard, the principal founder of regional science, assembled a group of scholars in Malmö, Sweden, for the purpose of establishing the Peace Research Society. The group of initial members included Kenneth Boulding and Anatol Rapoport. In 1973, this group became the Peace Science Society. Peace science was viewed as an interdisciplinary and international effort to develop a special set of concepts, techniques and data to better understand and mitigate conflict. Peace science attempts to use the quantitative techniques developed in economics especially game theory and econometrics, techniques otherwise seldom used by researchers in peace studies. The Peace Science Society website hosts the second edition of the Correlates of War, one of the most well-known collections of data on international conflict. The society holds an annual conference, attended by scholars from throughout the world, and publishes two scholarly journals: Journal of Conflict Resolution and Conflict Management and Peace Science.

In 1964, the International Peace Research Association was formed at a conference organized by Quakers in Clarens, Switzerland. Among the original executive committee was Johan Galtung. The IPRA holds a biennial conference. Research presented at its conferences and in its publications typically focuses on institutional and historical approaches, seldom employing quantitative techniques. In 2001, the Peace and Justice Studies Association (PJSA) was formed as a result of a merger of two precursor organisations. The PJSA is the North American affiliate of IPRA and includes members from around the world with a predominance from the United States and Canada. The PJSA publishes a regular newsletter (The Peace Chronicle), and holds annual conferences on themes related to the organization's mission "to create a just and peaceful world" through research, scholarship, pedagogy, and activism.

In 1981, a group of professional academic philosophers and scholars formed the Concerned Philosophers for Peace in response to the development of first-strike nuclear war strategies during the Cold war era. In addition to providing scholarly critiques of specific military actions, the organization also endeavors to encourage research into global peace in general and social justice on the international stage by encouraging cooperative research. Presentations of scholarly research are periodically made at divisional meetings of the American Philosophical Association.

In 2008, Strategic Foresight Group presented its report on an innovative mechanism to find sustainable solution to conflicts in the Middle East. It also developed a new Water Cooperation Quotient, which is a measure of active cooperation by riparian countries in the management of water resources using 10 parameters including legal, political, technical, environmental, economic and institutional aspects.

Institutions like Stockholm International Peace Research Institute (SIPRI) are advancing the understanding of peace and development by analyzing the complex drivers of conflict and insecurity. Their approach acknowledges that conflicts are rarely caused by a single factor. Instead, a constellation of economic, social, political, and environmental factors, often reinforcing and exacerbating each other in ways that can lead to sustained violence or, conversely, pave pathways to peace.

== Description ==
Peace and conflict studies along with its concepts of conflict analysis and conflict resolution can be classified as:

- Multidisciplinary, encompassing elements of International Relations, Sociology, Geography, Psychology, Anthropology and Economics.
- Multilevel. Peace studies examines intrapersonal peace, peace between individuals, neighbours, ethnic groups, marriages, states and civilisations.
- Multicultural. Gandhi is often cited as a paradigm of Peace Studies.
- Both analytic and normative. As a normative discipline, Peace Studies involves value judgements, such as "better" and "bad".
- Both theoretical and applied.

There has been a long-standing debate on disarmament issues, as well as attempts to investigate, catalogue, and analyse issues relating to arms production, trade, and their political impacts. There have also been attempt to map the economic costs of war, or of relapses into violence, as opposed to those of peace.

Peace and conflict studies is now well established within the social sciences: it comprises many scholarly journals, college and university departments, peace research institutes, conferences, as well as outside recognition of the utility of peace and conflict studies as a method.

Peace Studies allows one to examine the causes and prevention of war, as well as the nature of violence, including social oppression, discrimination and marginalization. Through peace studies one can also learn peace-making strategies to overcome persecution and transform society to attain a more just and equitable international community.

Feminist scholars have developed a speciality within conflict studies, specifically examining the role of gender and interlocking systems of inequality in armed and other conflicts. The importance of considering the role of gender in post-conflict work was recognised by the United Nations Security Council resolution 1325. Examples of feminist scholarship include the work of Carol Cohn and Claire Duncanson.

== Ideas ==
=== Conceptions of peace ===
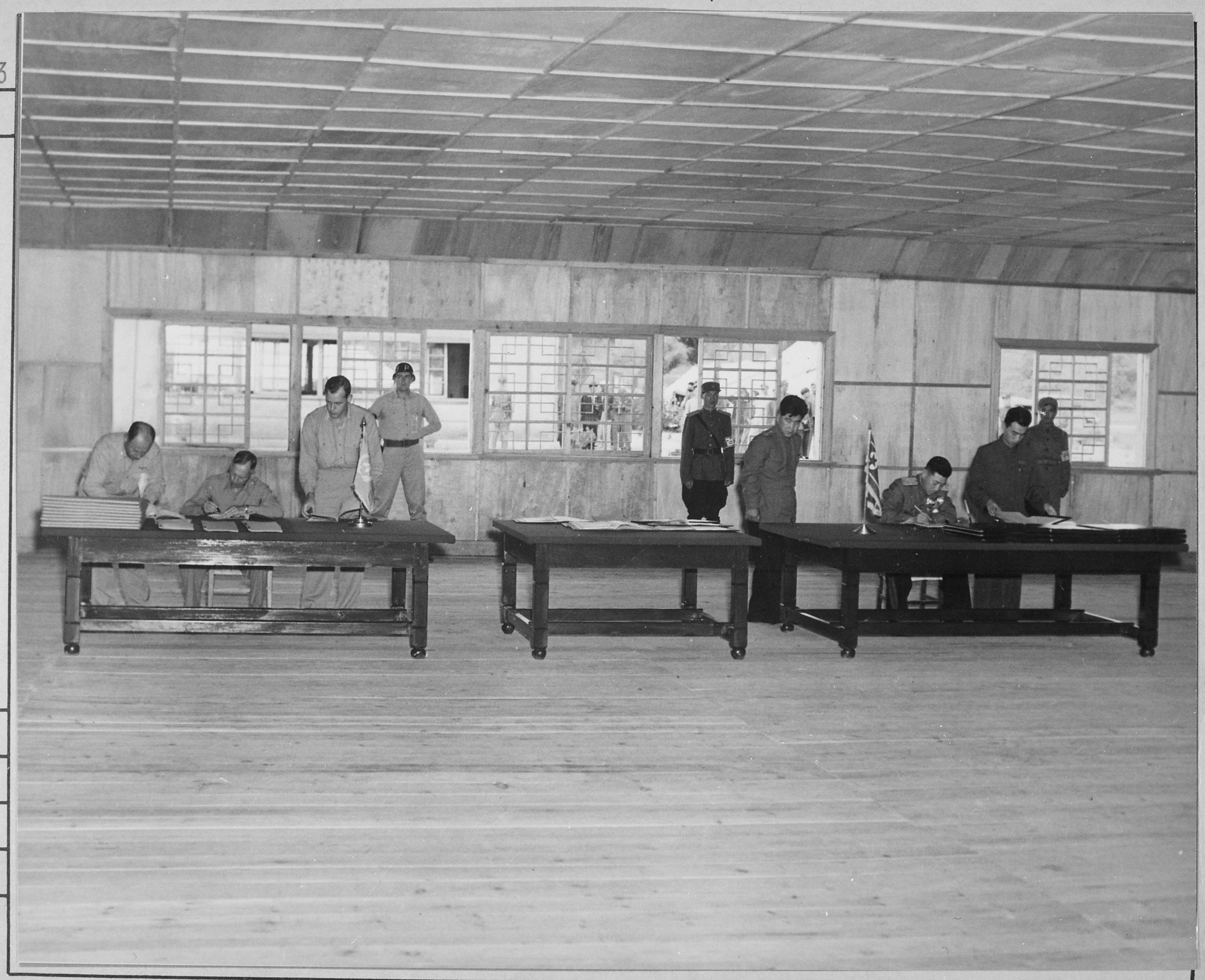
Delegates at the 1953 Korean Armistice Agreement achieved negative peace, ending the war but not the wider conflict.

Negative peace refers to the absence of direct violence. Positive peace refers to the critical theory of conflict resolution and the absence of indirect and structural violence, and is the concept that most peace and conflict researchers adopt. This is often credited to Galtung but these terms were previously used by Martin Luther King Jr. in his "Letter from Birmingham Jail" in 1963, in which he wrote about "negative peace which is the absence of tension" and "positive peace which is the presence of justice." These terms were perhaps first used by Jane Addams in a series of lectures about 'positive ideals of peace' begun in 1899 that took form in her book Newer Ideals of Peace where she switched to the term "newer ideals", but continued to contrast them to the term "negative peace"; she described them as we think of them today, as peace with "a sense of justice no longer outraged." The idea was further popularized by then-UN Secretary-General Boutros Boutros-Ghali in his 1992 report An Agenda for Peace, published in the aftermath of the Cold War.

Several conceptions, models, or modes of peace have been suggested in which peace research might prosper.

- The crux of the matter is that peace is a natural social condition, whereas war is not. The premise is simple for peace researchers: to present enough information so that a rational group of decision makers will seek to avoid war and conflict.
- Second, the view that violence is sinful or unskillful, and that non-violence is skillful or virtuous and should be cultivated. This view is held by a variety of religious traditions worldwide: Quakers, Mennonites and other Peace churches within Christianity; Baháʼís, Jains, the Satyagraha tradition in Hinduism, Buddhism, and other portions of Indian religion and philosophy; as well as certain schools of Islam.
- Third is pacifism: the view that peace is a prime force in human behaviour.
- A further approach is that there are multiple modes of peace.

There have been many offerings on these various forms of peace. These range from the well known works of Kant, Locke, Rousseau, Paine, on various liberal international and constitutional and plans for peace. Variations and additions have been developed more recently by scholars such as Raymond Aron, Edward Azar, John Burton, Martin Ceadal, Wolfgang Dietrich, Kevin Dooley, Johan Galtung, Robert L. Holmes, Michael Howard, Vivienne Jabri, John-Paul Lederach, Roger Mac Ginty, Pamina Firchow, Hugh Miall, David Mitrany, Oliver Ramsbotham, Anatol Rapoport, Mikkel Vedby Rasmussen, Oliver Richmond, S. P. Udayakumar, Tom Woodhouse, others mentioned above and many more. Democratic peace, liberal peace, sustainable peace, civil peace, hybrid peace, post-liberal peace, everyday peace, trans-rational peace(s) and other concepts are regularly used in such work.

=== Sustainable peace ===
Under the conceptions of peace, sustainable peace must be regarded as an important factor for the future of prosperity. Sustainable peace must be the priority of global society where state actors and non-state actors do not only seek for the profits in a near future that might violate the stable state of peace. For a sustainable peace, nurturing, empowerment, and communications are considered to be the crucial factors throughout the world. Firstly, nurturing is necessary to encourage psychological stability and emotional maturity. The significance of social value in adequate nurturing is important for sustainable peace. Secondly, in order to achieve real security and sustainable peace, inner security must be secured along with arranged social systems and protection based on firm foundation. Lastly, communications are necessary to overcome ignorance and isolation and establish a community based on reliable and useful information.

=== Conflict triangle ===
Johan Galtung's conflict triangle works on the assumption that the best way to define peace is to define violence, its opposite. It reflects the normative aim of preventing, managing, limiting and overcoming violence.

- Direct (overt) violence: for example, direct attacks and massacres.
- Structural violence: Structural violence is indirect violence caused by repressive, unequal and unjust social structures, not direct acts of violence or unavoidable causes of harm.
- Cultural violence: Cultural violence occurs as a result of the cultural assumptions that blind one to direct or structural violence. For example, one may be indifferent toward the homeless, or even consider their expulsion or extermination a good thing.

Each corner of Galtung's triangle can relate to the other two. Ethnic cleansing can be an example of all three.

A simplification of these can be phrased as:

- Direct violence: harming or hurting the body and mind.
- Structural violence: economic exploitation and political repression.
- Cultural violence: underlying values and epistemic models that legitimize direct and structural violence.

==== Applications of the triangle ====
Galtung's violence triangle has often been used to analyse interstate, territorial and ethnic conflicts. For example, Taleh Ziyadov applied the model to the Nagorno-Karabakh conflict, examining how direct violence was connected to structural disputes over territory and political status and to cultural narratives that legitimised hostility between Armenians and Azerbaijanis. After Galtung's death in 2024, the University of Pisa journal Scienza e Pace dedicated a special issue to his life, work and intellectual legacy. In a contribution to this issue, Tiziano Peccia used the triangle in a less conventional context by applying it to a conflict within the Ascione Camorra clan, a local non-state criminal organisation. Peccia interpreted physical assaults and threats as direct violence, the clan's patriarchal hierarchy and unequal treatment of women as structural violence, and beliefs concerning honour, fidelity, motherhood and female obedience as cultural violence that helped legitimise this inequality. The study therefore extended the model beyond wars and conflicts between states or ethnic groups, arguing that it could also be used to investigate gendered power relations, internal struggles and forms of violence within organised crime and other non-state organisations.

=== Appeasement and deterrence ===
Appeasement in a strategy of making political, material, or territorial concessions to an aggressive power to avoid conflict. Deterrence is a strategy to use threats or limited force to dissuade an actor from escalating conflict, typically because the prospective attacker believes that the probability of success is low and the costs of attack are high.

=== Cost of conflict and price of unjust peace ===
Cost of conflict is an approach which attempts to calculate the price of conflicts. The idea is to examine this cost, not only in terms of the deaths and casualties and the economic costs borne by the people involved, but also the social, developmental, environmental and strategic costs of conflict. The approach considers direct costs of conflict, for instance human deaths, expenditure, destruction of land and physical infrastructure; as well as indirect costs that impact a society, for instance migration, humiliation, growth of extremism and lack of civil society. The price of unjust peace can be higher than the cost of conflict.

=== Causality ===
The democratic peace theory claims that democracy causes peace, while the territorial peace theory disagrees and claims that peace causes democracy. The capitalist peace theory claims economic interdependence contributes to peace. Other explanations for peace include institutional liberalism, alliances, Pax Atomica, Pax Americana and political stability. Realism and liberal internationalism are claimed by some to lead in some cases to more wars and in other cases to fewer wars.

=== Critical theory ===
Critical theory argues for a shift from "negative peace" described as absence of violence against individuals to "positive peace" described as the absence of structural violence. This emerged rapidly at the end of the Cold War, and was encapsulated in the report of then-UN Secretary-General Boutros Boutros-Ghali, An Agenda for Peace. Indeed, it might be said that much of the machinery of what has been called "liberal peacebuilding" by a number of scholars and "statebuilding" by another is based largely on the work that has been carried out in this area. Many scholars in the area have advocated a more "emancipatory" form of peacebuilding, however, based upon a "Responsibility to Protect" (R2P), human security, local ownership and participation in such processes, especially after the limited success of liberal peacebuilding/ statebuilding in places as diverse as Cambodia, the Balkans, East Timor, Sierra Leone, Liberia, Nepal, Afghanistan, and Iraq. This approach includes the normatively oriented work that emerged in the peace studies and conflict research schools of the 1960s (e.g. Oslo Peace Research Institute on "Liberal Peace and the Ethics of Peacebuilding") and more critical theory ideas about peacebuilding that have recently developed in many European and non-western academic and policy circles.

=== Prediction and forecasting ===
Conflict forecasts and early warnings can be sufficiently precise to be relevant for policy and evaluation of theories. Conflict escalation can be rational for one side of the conflict in some cases of asymmetric conflicts, appeasement or for Fait accompli, causing challenges to de-escalation.

=== Internal conflicts and disaggregated data ===
Since the beginning of the 2000s, technical advances in geolocation of violent events and spatial analyses have fostered the emergence of a large number of empirical studies carried out at the disaggregated scale of regions, cities or geographical units. A 2019 survey shows that the use of disaggregated data has led to methodological advances that are important in understanding the role played by poverty and natural resources in the emergence of civil conflicts. This evolution of statistical tools also draws promising research perspectives for contemporary and still widely debated issues such as climate change. Nevertheless, this gain in precision must not be at the expense of a better understanding of the regional and global issues that are also involved in the emergence of civil conflicts. Thus, the issues of trade and social cohesion still need to be deepened because they are explained at the level of groups whose dimension is poorly understood.

A subsequent 2024 meta-regression analysis examines the narratives researchers use to describe how various shocks affect internal conflict risk through channels implicitly linked to income. After examining 2,464 subnational estimates from 64 empirical studies, the analysis finds that several publication biases related to scholars' methodological choices influence our understanding of this phenomenon. Importantly, studies that do not uncover empirical effects aligning with researchers' expectations regarding theoretical mechanisms are less likely to be published. After accounting for publication selection bias, the analysis finds that, on average, income-increasing shocks in the agriculture sector are negatively associated with the local risk of conflict. However, the analysis finds no average effect of income-decreasing shocks in the agriculture sector or income-increasing shocks in the extractive sector on the local risk of conflict. This opens avenues for further study on the observed heterogeneity in the literature, particularly focusing on the conditional aspects of how shocks and conflicts are measured, as well as geographical coverage, among other factors.

=== Complex system approach to peace and armed conflict ===
In the complex system approach to peace and armed conflict, the social systems of armed conflict are viewed as complex dynamical systems. The study of positive and negative feedback processes, attractors and system dimensionality, phase transitions and emergence is seen as providing improved understanding of the conflicts and of the effectiveness or ineffectiveness of interventions aiming to resolve the conflicts.

== Normative aims ==
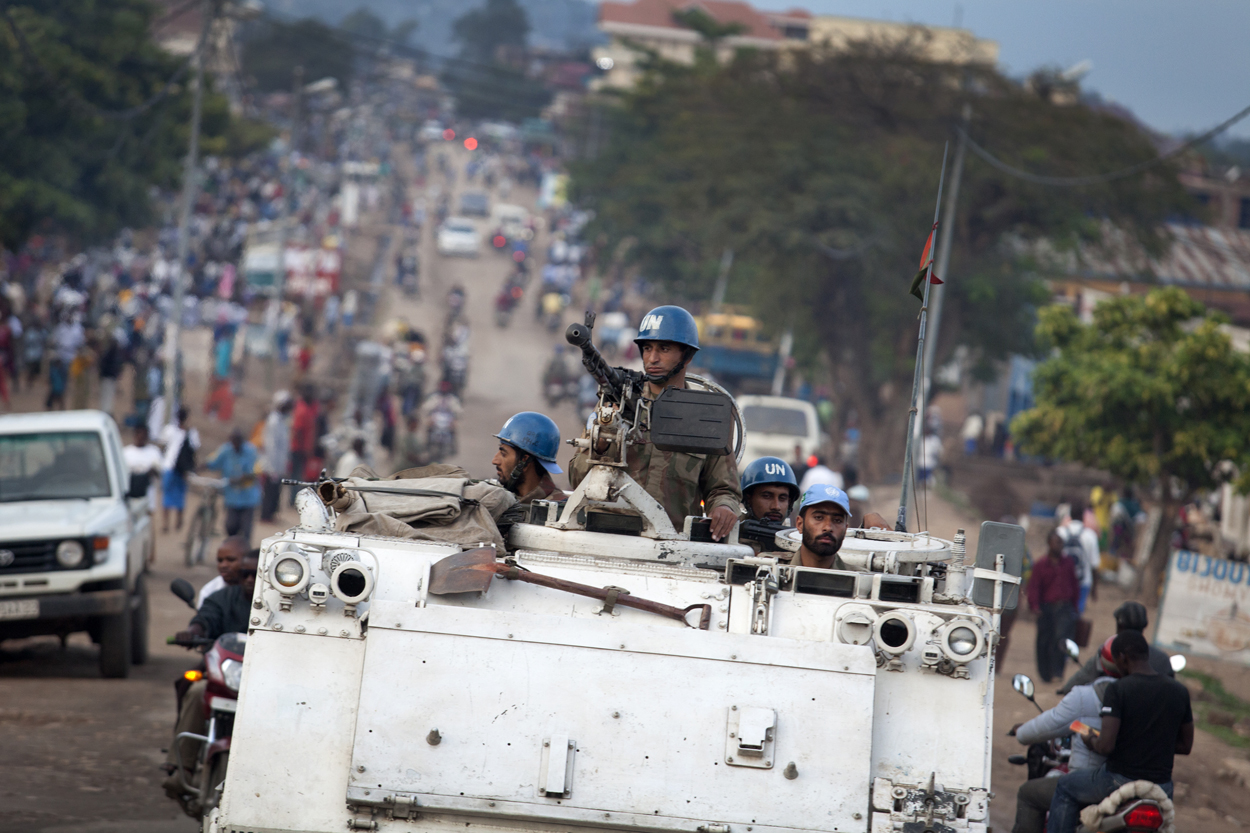
Peacekeeping efforts by armed forces can provide one means to limit and ultimately resolve conflict.

The normative aims of peace studies are conflict transformation and conflict resolution through mechanisms such as peacekeeping, peacebuilding (e.g., tackling disparities in rights, institutions and the distribution of world wealth) and peacemaking (e.g., mediation and conflict resolution). Peacekeeping falls under the aegis of negative peace, whereas efforts toward positive peace involve elements of critical theory, peace building and peacemaking.

== Peace and conflict studies in military ==
Peace and conflict are widely studied by militaries. One approach by military to prevent conflict and conflict escalation is deterrence. Critical theory argues that military is overtly committed to combat in the article "Teaching Peace to the Military", published in the journal Peace Review, James Page argues for five principles that ought to undergird this undertaking, namely, respect but do not privilege military experience, teach the just war theory, encourage students to be aware of the tradition and techniques of nonviolence, encourage students to deconstruct and demythologize, and recognize the importance of military virtue.

== Criticism and controversy ==
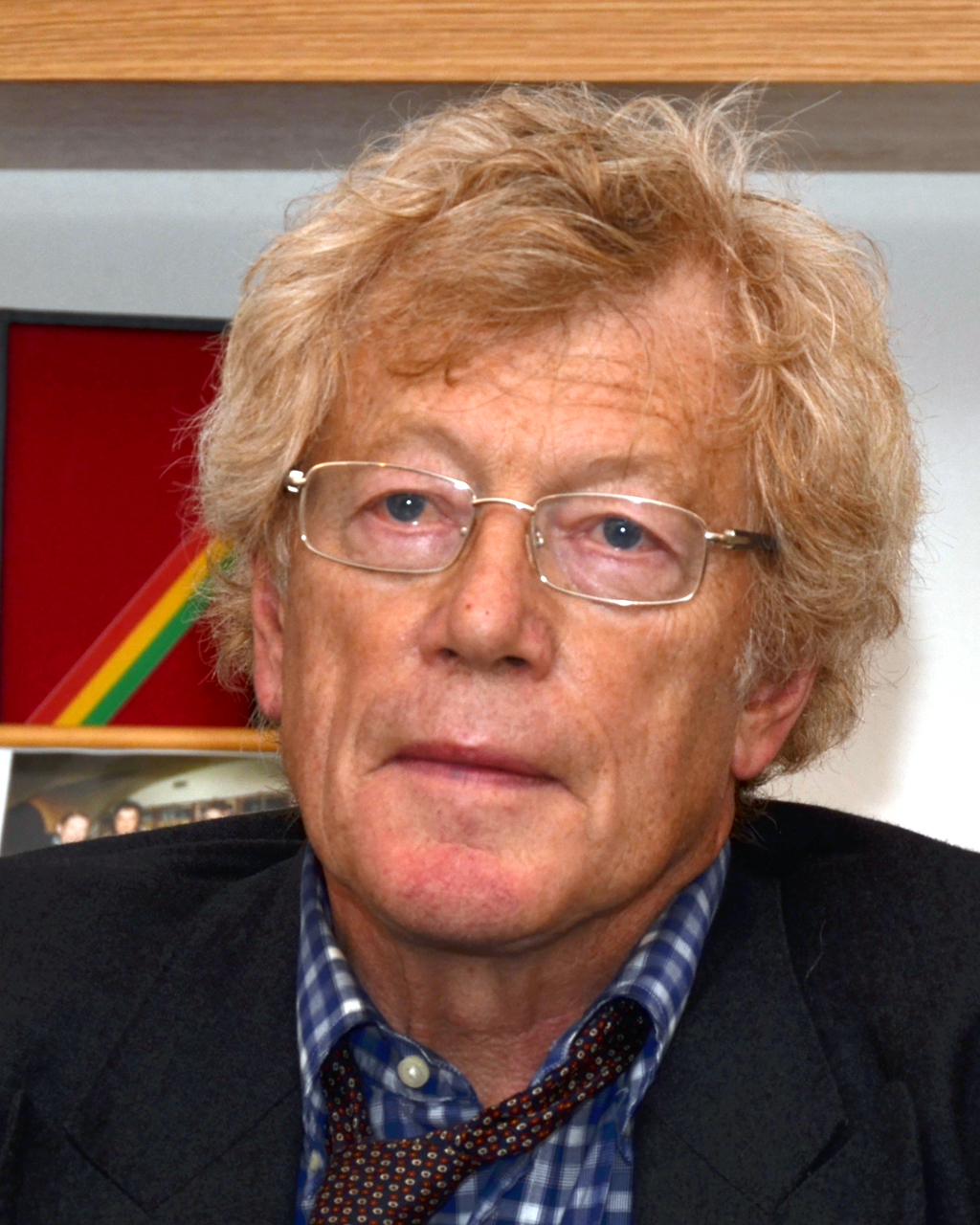
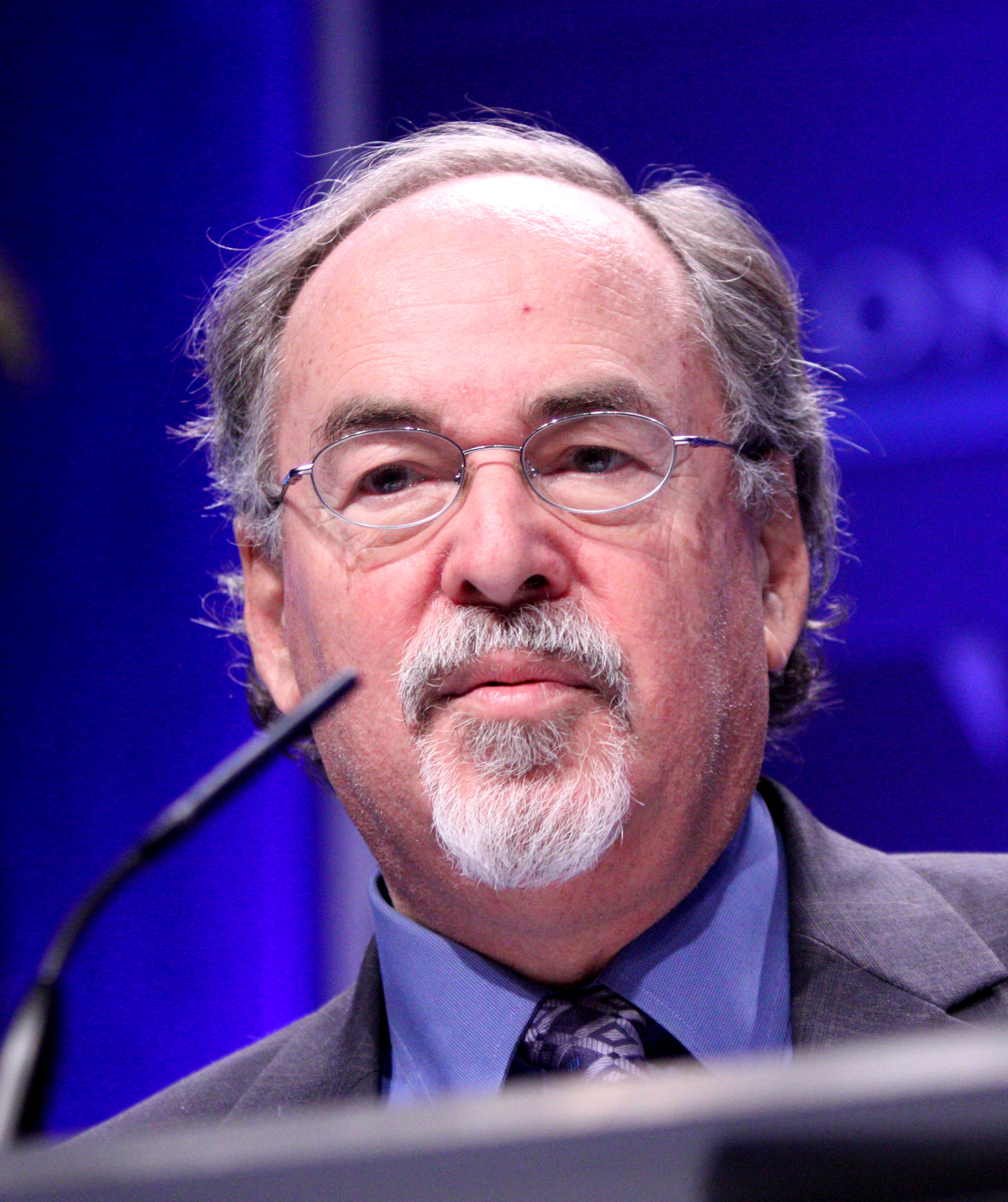
Conservative writers Roger Scruton (left) and David Horowitz (right) are among the critics of peace and conflict studies.

A number of criticisms have been aimed at critical theory in peace and conflict studies, often but not necessarily from outside the realms of university system, including that peace studies:

- does not produce practical prescriptions for managing or resolving global conflicts.
- are focused on putting a "respectable face on Western self-loathing".}
- are hypocritical because they "tacitly or openly support terrorism as a permissible strategy for the 'disempowered' to redress real or perceived grievances against the powerful" (i.e. ideological anti-Western concepts developed by social scientists such as Johan Galtung which arguably add a sense of unjustified acceptability which is used in support of radicalism);
- have curricula that are (according to human rights activist Caroline Cox and philosopher Roger Scruton) "intellectually incoherent, riddled with bias and unworthy of academic status...";
- have policies proposed to "eliminate the causes of violence" that are uniformly leftist policies, and not necessarily policies which would find broad agreement among social scientists.

In 1980, political scientist J. David Singer criticized peace research on three fronts:

1. Peace research contributed to creating a schism in research into the causes of war, thus making it harder to develop systematic research into war
2. "many peace researchers had the intellectual innocence of most bright amateurs; they underestimated the rate at which their research findings would become applicable and would be applied to major policy problems of the day."
3. many peace researchers failed to distinguish between objective research into the conditions of war and peace on one hand, and political action and propaganda in favor of specific policies

Barbara Kay, a columnist for the National Post, specifically criticized the views of Norwegian professor Johan Galtung, who is considered to be a leader in modern peace research. Kay wrote that Galtung has written on the "structural fascism" of "rich, Western, Christian" democracies, admires Fidel Castro, opposed resistance to the Soviet Invasion of Hungary in 1956, and has described Aleksandr Solzhenitsyn and Andrei Sakharov as "persecuted elite personages". Galtung has also praised Mao Zedong for "endlessly liberating" China. Galtung has also stated that the United States is a "killer country" that is guilty of "neo-fascist state terrorism" and has reportedly stated that the destruction of Washington, D.C., could be justified by America's foreign policy. He has also compared the United States to Nazi Germany for bombing Kosovo during the 1999 NATO bombing of Yugoslavia.

In the Summer 2007 edition of City Journal, Bruce Bawer sharply criticized Peace Studies. He noted that many Peace Studies programs in American Universities are run by Marxist or far-left Professors. More broadly, he argued that Peace Studies are dominated by the belief that "America ... is the wellspring of the world's problems" and that while Professors of Peace Studies argue "that terrorist positions deserve respect at the negotiating table," they "seldom tolerate alternative views" and that "(p)eace studies, as a rule, rejects questioning of its own guiding ideology."

Regarding his claim that Peace Studies supports violence in the pursuit of leftist ideology, Bawer cited a quote from Peace and Conflict Studies, a widely used 2002 textbook written by Charles P. Webel and David P. Barash which praised Vladimir Lenin because he "maintained that only revolution—not reform—could undo capitalism's tendency toward imperialism and thence to war."

David Horowitz has argued that Webel and Barash's book implicitly supports violence for socialist causes, noting that the book states "the case of Cuba indicates that violent revolutions can sometimes result in generally improved living conditions for many people." Horowitz also argued that the book "treats the Soviet Union as a sponsor of peace movements, and the United States as the militaristic, imperialist power that peace movements try to keep in check" and that "the authors justify Communist policies and actions while casting those of America and Western democracies in a negative light." Horowitz also claimed that the authors discuss the Cuban Missile Crisis without mentioning its cause (i.e. the placement of the Soviet missiles in Cuba) and blame John F. Kennedy while praising Soviet Premier Nikita Khrushchev for "be[ing] willing to back down". Finally, Horowitz criticized the author's use of Marxist writers, such as Andre Gunder Frank and Frances Moore Lappe, as the sole basis on which to study "poverty and hunger as causes of human conflict."

Kay and Bawer also specifically criticized Professor Gordon Fellman, the Chairman of Brandeis University's Peace, Conflict, and Coexistence Studies Program, who they claimed has justified Palestinian suicide-bombings against Israelis as "ways of inflicting revenge on an enemy that seems unable or unwilling to respond to rational pleas for discussion and justice."

Katherine Kersten, who is a senior fellow at the Minneapolis-based conservative think tank Center of the American Experiment, believes that Peace Studies programs are "dominated by people of a certain ideological bent, and [are] thus hard to take seriously." Robert Kennedy, a professor of Catholic studies and management at the University of St. Thomas, criticized his university's Peace Studies Program in an interview with Minneapolis Star Tribune in 2002, stating that the program employs several adjunct professors "whose academic qualifications are not as strong as we would ordinarily look for" and that "The combination of the ideological bite and the maybe less-than-full academic credentials of the faculty would probably raise some questions about how scholarly the program is." Some contemporary writers have also examined the role of narrative and education in peacebuilding, with John Paul Lederach and Marshall Wordsworth describing these approaches as contributing to long-term social cohesion.

=== Responses ===
Such views have been strongly opposed by scholars who claim that these criticisms underestimate the development of detailed interdisciplinary, theoretical, methodological, and empirical research into the causes of violence and dynamics of peace that has occurred via academic and policy networks around the world.

In reply to Barbara Kay's article, a group of Peace Studies experts in Canada responded that "Kay's...argument that the field of peace studies endorses terrorism is nonsense" and that "(d)edicated peace theorists and researchers are distinguished by their commitment to reduce the use of violence whether committed by enemy nations, friendly governments or warlords of any stripe." They also argued that:

...Ms. Kay attempts to portray advocates for peace as naive and idealistic, but the data shows that the large majority of armed conflicts in recent decades have been ended through negotiations, not military solutions. In the contemporary world, violence is less effective than diplomacy in ending armed conflict. Nothing is 100% effective to reduce tyranny and violence, but domestic and foreign strategy needs to be based on evidence, rather than assumptions and misconceptions from a bygone era.

Most academics in the area argue that the accusations are incorrect that peace studies approaches are not objective, and derived from mainly leftist or inexpert sources, are not practical, support violence rather than reject it, or have not led to policy developments.

The development of UN and major donor policies (including the EU, US, and UK, as well as many others including those of Japan, Canada, Norway, etc.) towards and in conflict and post-conflict countries have been heavily influenced by such debates. A range of key policy documents and responses have been developed by these governments in the last decade and more, and in UN (or related) documentation such as "Agenda for Peace", "Agenda for Development", "Agenda for Democratization", the Millennium Development Goals, Responsibility to Protect, and the "High Level Panel Report". They have also been significant for the work of the World Bank, international development agencies, and a wide range of nongovernmental organisations. It has been influential in the work of, among others, the UN, UNDP, UN Peacebuilding Commission, UNHCR, World Bank, EU, Organization for Security and Co-operation in Europe, for national donors including USAID, DFID, CIDA, NORAD, DANIDA, Japan Aid, GTZ, and international NGOs such as International Alert or International Crisis Group, as well as many local NGOs. Major databases have been generated by the work of scholars in these areas.

Finally, peace and conflict studies debates have generally confirmed, not undermined, a broad consensus (in developed world and the Global South) on the importance of human security, human rights, development, democracy, and a rule of law (though there is a vibrant debate ongoing about the contextual variations and applications of these frameworks). At the same time, the research field is characterized by a number of challenges including the tension between "the objective of doing critical research and being of practical relevance".

== See also ==
- Arms control
- Center for Global Nonkilling
- Capitalist peace
- Democratic peace theory
- Global Peace Index
- Historic recurrence
- International security
- Just war theory
- List of peace activists
- Nonkilling
- Nonviolence
- Peace and Justice Studies Association
- Peace churches
- Peace education
- Reconciliation studies
- Right of conquest
- Security studies
- Stockholm International Peace Research Institute
- Territorial peace theory
- War against war
- War studies
- World peace

=== Journals ===
- International Peacekeeping
- Journal of Conflict Resolution
- Journal of Peace Research
- Journal for Peace and Justice Studies
- Peace Review
- The Acorn: Philosophical Studies in Pacifism and Nonviolence

=== People ===
- Jane Addams
- Camillo Mac Bica
- Elise M. Boulding
- Stanley A. Deetz
- Johan Galtung
- Robert L. Holmes
- John Maynard Keynes
- Michael Murphy Andregg
- Glenn D. Paige
- Peter Wallensteen

== Sources and further reading ==
- Aron, Raymond, Peace and War: A Theory of International Relations, London: Transaction, 2003 [1966].
- Avruch, Kevin, Peter W. Black, and Joseph A. Scimecca (eds.), Conflict Resolution: Cross-Cultural Perspectives, London: Greenwood Press, 1991.
- Azar, Edward E., The Management of Protracted Social Conflict, Hampshire, UK: Dartmouth Publishing, 1990.
- Beer, Francis A., Meanings of War and Peace, College Station: Texas A & M University Press 2001.
- Beer, Francis, Peace Against War, San Francisco: W.H. Freeman, 1981.
- Bawer, Bruce, "The Peace Racket", City Journal, Summer 2007 link
- Burton, John W., and Edward E. Azar, International Conflict Resolution: Theory and Practice, Sussex: Wheatsheaf Books, 1986.
- Caplan, Richard, International Governance of War-Torn Territories: Rule and Reconstruction, Oxford: Oxford University Press, 2005.
- Ceadal, M, Thinking about Peace and War, Oxford: Oxford University Press, 1987.
- Chandler, D. Empire in Denial: The Politics of State-Building. Pluto Press, 2006.
- Churchman, D. The Origins, Nature, and Management of Human Conflict. University Press of America, 2013.
- Cooper, Neil, "What's the Point of Arms Transfer Controls?", Contemporary Security Policy, Vol. 27, No. 1, April 2006 pp. 118–137.
- Jarat Chopra, and Tanja Hohe, "Participatory Intervention", Global Governance, Vol. 10, 2004.
- Darby, John, and Roger MacGinty, Contemporary Peacemaking, London: Palgrave, 2003.
- Wolfgang Dietrich, Josefina Eachavarría Alvarez, Norbert Koppensteiner eds.: Key Texts of Peace Studies; LIT Münster, Vienna, 2006.
- Wolfgang Dietrich, Daniela Ingruber, Josefina Echavarría, Gustavo Esteva and Norbert Koppensteiner (eds.): The Palgrave International Handbook of Peace Studies: A Cultural Perspective, London: Palgrave Macmillan, 2011.
- Dooley, Kevin L., and S.P. Udayakumar, "Reconceptualizing Global Conflicts: From Us Versus Them to Us Versus Then," Journal of Global Change and Governance, Vol. 2, No. 1, Spring 2009.
- Downes, Alexander B.; Sechser, Todd S. (2012). "The Illusion of Democratic Credibility". International Organization. 66 (3): 457–489. doi:10.1017/S0020818312000161. ISSN 0020-8183. JSTOR 23279964. S2CID 154325372.
- Duffield, Mark, Global Governance and the New Wars: The Merging of Development and Security, London: Zed Books, 2001.
- Dugan, M. 1989. "Peace Studies at the Graduate Level." The Annals of the American Academy of Political Science: Peace Studies: Past and Future, 504, 72–79.
- Dunn, DJ, The First Fifty Years of Peace Research, Aldershot: Ashgate, 2005.
- Fukuyama, Francis, State Building: Governance and World Order in the Twenty-First Century, Ithaca, NY: Cornell University Press, 2004.
- Galtung, J., "A Structural Theory of Imperialism", Journal of Peace Research, Vol. 13, No. 2, 1971.
- Galtung, Johan, and Carl G. Jacobsen, Searching for Peace: The Road to TRANSCEND, Pluto Press: London, 2000.
- Gibler, Douglas M.; Miller, Steven V. (2021). "The Territorial Peace: Current and Future Research". In McLaughlin, Sara; Vasquez, John A. (eds.). What do we know about War? (3 ed.). Rowman & Littlefield. pp. 158–170.
- Harris, Ian, Larry J. Fisk, and Carol Rank. (1998). "A Portrait of University Peace Studies in North America and Western Europe at the End of the Millennium." International Journal of Peace Studies. Volume 3, Number 1. ISSN 1085-7494 link
- Hobson, Christopher (2017). "Democratic Peace: Progress and Crisis". Perspectives on Politics. 15 (3): 697–710. doi:10.1017/S1537592717000913. ISSN 1537-5927. S2CID 149278000.
- Holmes, Robert L. Pacifism: A Philosophy of Nonviolence, London, Bloomsbury, 2017.
- Howard, M. The Invention of Peace and the Re-Invention of War, London: Profile, 2002.
- Jabri, Vivienne, Discourses on Violence, Manchester, UK: Manchester University Press, 1996.
- Jabri, Vivienne, War and the Transformation of Global Politics, London: Palgrave, 2007.
- Keynes, John Maynard, The Economic Consequences of the Peace, London: Macmillan, 1920.
- Koppensteiner, Norbert: The Art of the Transpersonal Self. Transformation as Aesthetic and Energetic Practice; [ATROPOS] New York, Dresden, 2009.
- Kosaka, Masataka, International Politics and the Search for Peace, Tokyo: Japan Publishing Industry Foundation for Culture, 2023 [1966]. link
- Kumar, Samrat Schmiem, Bhakti – the yoga of love: Trans-rational approaches to Peace Studies; Münster: LIT Verlag, 2010.
- Laville, C. (2019). "The Causes of Civil Conflicts: Recent Advances Using Disaggregated Data". Revue Française d'Économie. XXXIV (3): 123–165. doi:10.3917/rfe.193.0123. S2CID 239356684.
- Laville, C.; Mandon, P. (2024). "Internal Conflicts and Shocks: A Narrative Meta-Analysis". Journal of Peace Research. online first. doi:10.1177/00223433241283323. S2CID 258096105.
- Lederach, J., Building Peace: Sustainable Reconciliation in Divided Societies, Tokyo: United Nations University Press, 1997.
- López-Martínez, Mario (dir) Enciclopedia de paz y conflictos. Granada, 2004. ISBN 84-338-3095-3, 2 tomos.
- Lund, Michael S., "What Kind of Peace Is being Built: Taking Stock of Post-Conflict Peacebuilding and Charting Future Directions", Paper presented on the 10th Anniversary of Agenda for Peace, International Development Research Centre, Ottawa, Canada, January 2003.
- Miall, Hugh, Oliver Ramsbotham, and Tom Woodhouse, Contemporary Conflict Resolution, Polity Press, 2005.
- Mitrany, D.A., The Functional Theory of Politics, London: Martin Robertson, 1975.
- Reiter, Dan (25 January 2017). "Is Democracy a Cause of Peace?". Oxford Research Encyclopedia of Politics. doi:10.1093/acrefore/9780190228637.013.287. ISBN 978-0-19-022863-7. Archived from the original on 15 June 2017.
- Richmond, OP, Maintaining Order, Making Peace, London: Palgrave Macmillan, 2002.
- Richmond, OP, A Post-Liberal Peace, London: Routledge, 2011.
- Richmond, OP, The Transformation of Peace, London: Palgrave Macmillan, 2005. ————
- Richmond, OP, and Jason Franks, Liberal Peace Transitions: Between Statebuilding and Peacebuilding, Edinburgh: Edinburgh University Press, 2009.
- Rosato, Sebastian (2003). "The Flawed Logic of Democratic Peace Theory". American Political Science Review. 97 (4): 585–602. doi:10.1017/s0003055403000893. S2CID 17654114.
- Routledge Contemporary Security Studies series: Women, Peace and Security: Translating Policy into Practice First published 2010. Introduction by 'Funmi Olonisakin, Director of Conflict, Security & Development Group, King's College London, and Karen Barnes. Chapter by Lesley Abdela 'Nepal and the implementation of UNSCR1325'. ISBN 978-0-415-58797-6 (hbk)
- Rummel, RJ, The Just Peace, Beverly Hills, CA: Sage, 1981.
- Tadjbakhsh, Shahrbanou, and Anuradha M. Chenoy, Human Security: Concepts and Implications, London: Routledge, 2006
- Singer, J. David (1976). "An Assessment of Peace Research." International Security. 1 (1): 118–137.
- Taylor, Paul, and A.J.R. Groom (eds.), The UN at the Millennium, London: Continuum, 2000.
- Tidwell, Alan C., Conflict Resolved, London: Pinter, 1998.
- Trinn, Christoph, and Thomas Wencker, "Integrating the Quantitative Research on the Onset and Incidence of Violent Intrastate Conflicts" International Studies Review, 2020. (doi.org/10.1093/isr/viaa023)
- Vayrynen, R., New Directions in Conflict Theory: Conflict Resolution and Conflict Transformation, London: Sage, 1991.
- Vedby Rasmussen, Mikkel, The West, Civil Society, and the Construction of Peace, London: Palgrave, 2003.
- Wallensteen, Peter (ed.), Peace Research: Achievements and Challenges, Boulder, CO: Westview Press, 1988.
- Young, Nigel J. (ed.), The Oxford International Encyclopedia of Peace (4 vols. 2010) 3:449–498.
- Zartman, William, and Lewis Rasmussen (eds.), Peacemaking in International Conflict: Methods and Techniques, Washington, DC: United States Institute of Peace Press, 1997.
