= Guje Sevón =

Swedish academic

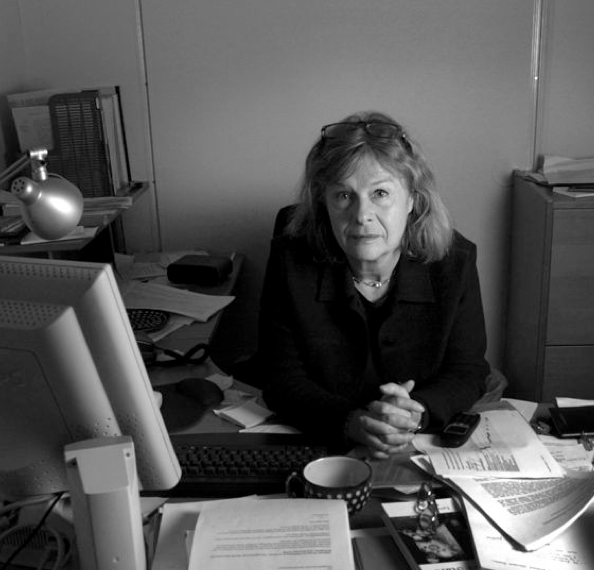
- Born: Guje Agneta Lindberg; September 20, 1943 (age 82); Sanda, Gotland, Sweden
- Occupation: Professor
- Spouses: Leif Sevón; (m. 1965–1996): Per Olof Berg; (m. 1999)

Guje Agneta Sevón (born 20 September 1943) is a Swedish and Finnish academic in psychology, and management and organization. She is currently focusing her research on individuals and organizations in a world of travelling management ideas and mutable resources.

== Education ==
Sevón holds an MA in psychology from University of Uppsala, Sweden 1965 and a doctorate degree in psychology from Åbo Akademi University, Finland 1978.

== Affiliations ==
Guje Sevón is professor emerita, retired from a chair in economic psychology at Stockholm School of Economics, Sweden. Between 1983 and 2001 she was professor of management and organization and head of department of management and organization at Hanken School of Economics, in Helsinki, Finland. Before that, between 1973 and 1983, she was head of the Research Institute of Hanken. She is appointed adjunct professor in psychology at Åbo Akademi University, and adjunct professor in adult education at University of Helsinki. Meanwhile, she has also been guest professor at Copenhagen Business School, Denmark, Fulbright Research Scholar at Stanford University, US, and visiting research fellow at University of Auckland Business School, New Zealand, University of Technology, Sydney, Australia and University of Siena, Italy. She is one of the five founders of the research institute Scancor at Stanford University and she was a board member of International Association of Applied Psychology .

Sevón is a member of the Finnish Society of Sciences and Letters since 1986. Besides her academic occupation she has been engaged as member of boards, e.g. in Aktia Bank (Helsinki, Finland), The Folkhälsan Foundation (Helsinki, Finland), and Moderna Dansteatern - MDT (Stockholm, Sweden). She is currently chair of the board of Grafikens Hus (Sweden), and member of the board of the Swedish-Danish Culture Fund.

Guje Sevón is since 1999 married to professor Per Olof Berg and resident of Strängnäs, Sweden. She holds a Swedish and a Finnish citizenship.

== Bibliography (a selection) ==
- Sevón, G. (1978) Prediction of social events. Dissertation, Summary. Åbo Akademi University.
- March, J. G., & Sevon, G. (1984) Gossip, information, and decision-making. Advances in information processing in organizations, 1, 95–107.
- Czarniawska-Joerges, B. & Sevón, G. (1996) Translating organizational change, Berlin; New York: Walter de Gruyter.
- Czarniawska, B. & Sevón, G. (2003) The Northern Lights - Organization Theory in Scandinavia. Malmö: Liber.
- Czarniawska-Joerges, B. & Sevón, G. (2005) Global ideas: how ideas, objects and practices travel in a global economy, Malmö: Liber & Copenhagen Business School Press.
- Berg, P.O. & Sevón, G (2014) Food-branding places - A sensory perspective. Place Branding and Public Diplomacy, 10, 289–304.
