= Peace Review =

- Discipline: Peace and conflict studies
- Language: English
- Edited by: Katerina Standish

Publication details
- Publisher: Routledge
- Frequency: Quarterly
- Impact factor: (2014)

Standard abbreviations
- ISO 4: Peace Rev.

Indexing
- ISSN: 1040-2659 (print); 1469-9982 (web)
- LCCN: 2002238316
- OCLC no.: 709961507

Links
- Journal homepage; Online access; Online archive

Peace Review is a quarterly peer-reviewed academic journal published by Routledge and covering peace and conflict studies. It was established in 1992 by John Harris (Stanford University), although the editorship was soon assumed by Robert Elias (University of San Francisco). Katerina Standish, Director of the Arthur V. Mauro Institute for Peace & Justice Studies at St. Paul’s College, University of Manitoba, has been Editor-in-Chief since 2021.
