= Stanley A. Deetz =

U.S. academic figure

Stanley A. Deetz is President of Interaction Design for Innovation and Professor Emeritus and a President's Teaching Scholar at the University of Colorado at Boulder. He was the Founding Director of the Center for the Study of Conflict, Collaboration and Creative Governance and long term Director of the Peace and Conflict Studies Program when he taught at the University of Colorado.

== Life ==
Stanley Deetz grew up on a dairy farm in Indiana. He received his B.S. in Economics and Speech/ Drama from Manchester College in 1970. Deetz attended Ohio University for both his M.A. (1972) and his Ph.D. (1973) in Communication, both under the advisement of Kenneth Williams. His master's thesis was titled, "An ethnomethodological analysis of selected approach to the speech act." His doctoral dissertation was titled, "Essays on hermeneutics and communication research." Deetz was a Claude Kantner Fellow in his final year of graduate study in 1973.

Deetz has taught at several institutions: Bridgewater State College from 1973–77; Southern Illinois University from 1977–84; and Rutgers University from 1984–97. From 1997 to 2014, Deetz was a professor at the University of Colorado at Boulder. He spent the spring semester of 1994 as a Senior Fulbright Scholar at Göteborgs Universitët in Sweden.

Deetz has held visiting appointments at Arizona State University, the University of Texas, the University of Iowa, Federal University of Minas Gerais (Brazil), and the Copenhagen Business School (Denmark). Colegio Mayor University (Colombia), Universidad Autonoma Metropolitana-Iztapalapa (Mexico).

He served as president of the International Communication Association from 1996–97.

== Academic scholarship ==
Deetz's specialization in organizational studies and organizational communication began from a philosophical understanding of the social (interactional) construction of human experience developing to a critical and cultural perspective about power and practices of corporations. Summarizing his position, "If human experience is social constructed, it is done so under various conditions of inequality, and hence we have a practical and moral obligation to make actual places of construction more democratic."

== Selected publications ==
Deetz has authored, co-authored, and edited twelve books and more than 140 scholarly articles. Selected books include:

- Deetz, S., Tracy, S., and Simpson, J. (2000). Leading organizations through transitions: Communication and cultural change. Thousand Oaks, CA: Sage.
- Alvesson, M. & Deetz, S. (2000). Doing critical management research. London: Sage. 240 pages. Hrd & pbk. Translated into Swedish as Kritisk samhällsforskning. Lund, Sweden: Studentlitteratur.
- Deetz, S. (1995). Transforming communication, transforming business: Building responsive and responsible workplaces. Cresskill, NJ: Hampton Press.
- Deetz, S. (1992). Democracy in an age of corporate colonization: Developments in communication and the politics of everyday life. Albany: State University of New York Press.
- Deetz, S. and Stevenson, S. (1986). Managing interpersonal communication. New York: Harper and Row.
