= Yttermalung =

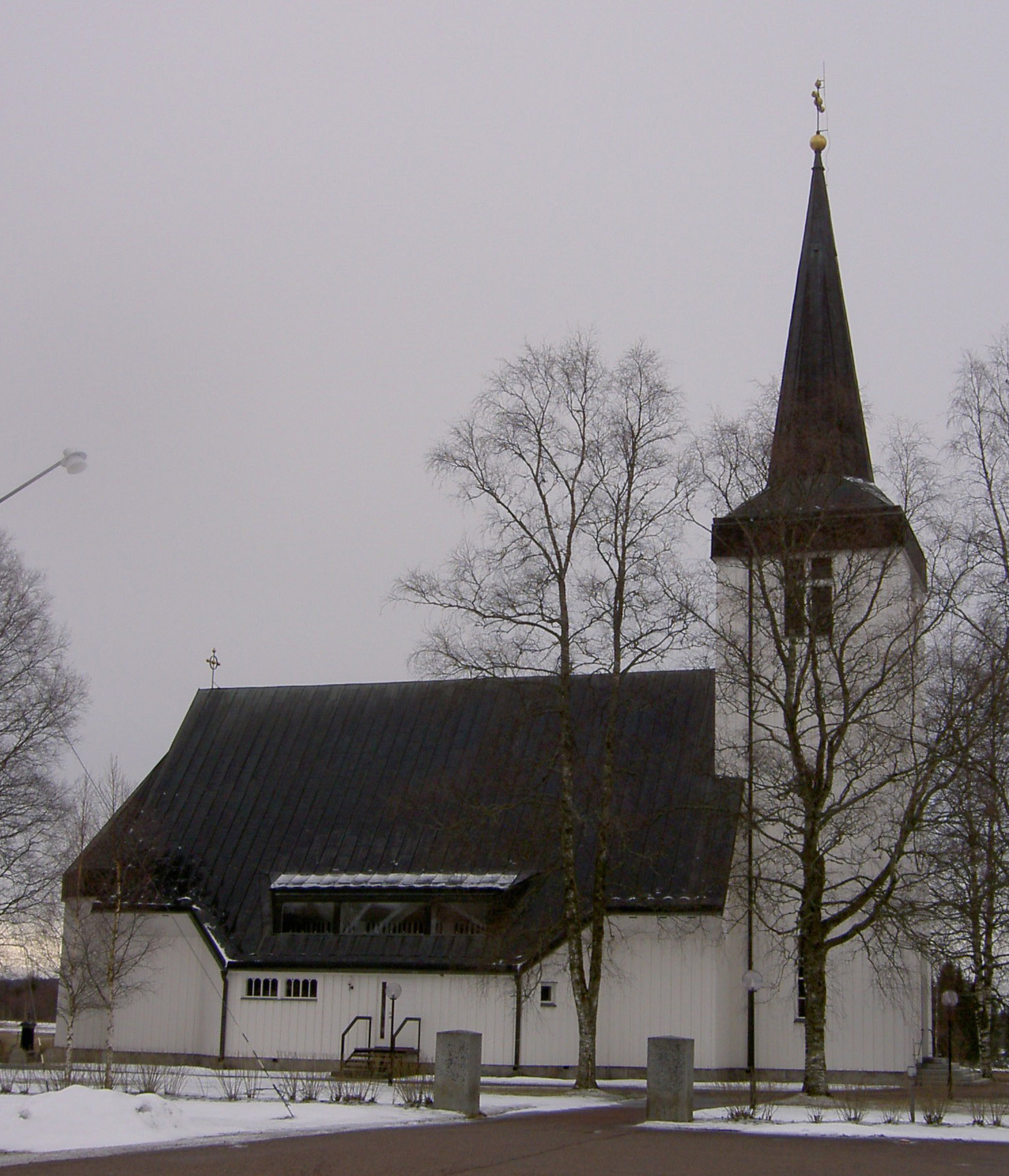
- The chapel in Yttermalung

- Location within Dalarna Location within Sweden
- Coordinates: 60°35′N 13°50′E
- Country: Sweden
- Province: Dalarna
- County: Dalarna County
- Municipality: Malung-Sälen Municipality

Area
  - Total: 0.77 km^{2} (0.30 sq mi)

Population (2005-12-31)
  - Total: 216
  - Density: 282/km^{2} (730/sq mi)
- Time zone: UTC+1 (CET)
  - Summer (DST): UTC+2 (CEST)

Yttermalung is a village situated in Malung-Sälen Municipality, Dalarna County, Sweden with 216 inhabitants in 2005.

The village has a church, Yttermalungs kapell. There has been a chapel or church in Yttermalung since the 16th century, and the current church building was built in the late 19th century.

In 1974, the largest collection of plate money in Sweden was found in Yttermalung. The collection consists of 240 plate coins, all in all weighing more than 234 kg. According to local tradition, the plate coins had been hidden in the mid-18th century by a powerful woman in the village who had become rich by selling timber to the copper mine in Falun, and who had died without telling anybody where she had hidden her riches.

The Swedish politician Marit Paulsen, who was a Member of the European Parliament, lived in Yttermalung.
