= Hugh Willmott =

British academic

Hugh Willmott FBA FAcSS
- Born: Hugh Christopher Willmott; 17 September 1950 (age 76)

Academic background
- Education: University of Manchester (BSc, PhD)

Hugh Christopher Willmott, FBA, FAcSS (born 17 September 1950) is a management and organization studies scholar and academic. Since 2005, he has been research professor of Organization Studies at Cardiff University, and has also been Professor of Management at Bayes Business School at City, University of London since 2014.

== Career ==
Willmott was educated at the University of Manchester, graduating with his undergraduate degree in 1972, and then completing his doctorate there five years later. He then worked at the Aston University until 1988, when he became a lecturer at the University of Manchester's School of Management; in 1991, he was promoted to senior lecturer, in 1993 to a readership, and in 1995 to be Professor of Organizational Analysis. In 2001, he was appointed Diageo Professor of Management Studies at the University of Cambridge, and then in 2005 joined Cardiff University as research professor of Organization Studies. In 2014, he was also appointed Professor of Management at Bayes Business School.

According to his British Academy profile, Willmott's research focuses on "critical studies of management; applications of social theory to management philosophies and practices; [and] organizational change and control".

== Awards and honours ==
In 2009, Willmott was elected a Fellow of the Academy of Social Sciences. He received an honorary doctor of philosophy degree from Lund University in 2011. In 2015, he was elected a Fellow of the British Academy, the United Kingdom's national academy for the humanities and social sciences.
