= Tobias Ide (scholar) =

German-Australian political scientist and geographer

Tobias Ide is a German-Australian political scientist and geographer. He is currently Professor of Peace and Conflict Studies, Technische Universität Darmstadt in Germany. Ide is known for his research on climate security and environmental peacebuilding, using quantitative and qualitative methods. He also consults decision makers, for instance at the United Nations, World Bank, and NATO.

== Research ==
Ide has worked extensively on the impacts of climate change and conflict risks. In several studies, he showed that climate-related disasters increase the risk of protests, armed conflict onset, and civil war escalation. However, he argues that this does not happen always and automatically, but only if certain context factors are present. These include the political exclusion of ethnic groups, low levels of development, a weakening of the government, and unsuitable government responses to the disaster. He finds similar patterns when analysing conflicts about renewable resources. In his 2023 book Catastrophes, Confrontations, and Constraints, Ide argues that disasters can also lead to temporary reductions in conflict intensity by weakening the conflict parties. Such time periods provide windows of opportunity for aid delivery and conflict resolution.

Furthermore, Ide has conducted widely cited research on environmental peacebuilding. He demonstrated that water and conservation cooperation between states can support already existing reconciliation efforts, drawing on examples like the Lempa River and the Virunga National Park. He also argues that environmental cooperation contributes to peacebuilding within countries by improving the environmental situation, increasing trust and understanding, and building shared institutions. Such efforts can contribute to local and everyday peace if relevant institutions support the efforts and there is widespread agreement on the nature and urgency of environmental problems.

Ide has coined the concept of the "dark side of environmental peacebuilding", by which he refers to six potential adverse effects of environmental peacebuilding efforts:

- depoliticization (of underlying conflict drivers),
- (unvoluntary) displacement of people (e.g., by cooperative dam projects),
- discrimination of certain groups,
- deterioration into conflict (due to grievances about the efforts),
- delegitimization of the state (if NGOs and international actors perform more successful environmental management), and
- degradation of the environment (e.g., cooperative resource exploitation).

These adverse effects are often unintended and avoidable. In 2022, he received the Enhancing the Environmental Peacebuilding Knowledge Base Award for this work.

== Career ==
Ide was born in 1985. He studied Political Science and Media and Communication Studies at the University of Leipzig (2005–2012). Afterwards, he went on to receive a PhD in Earth Sciences from the University of Hamburg (2015) and his habilitation in Political Science from the Technical University of Braunschweig (2019). After his PhD, he worked at the Georg Eckert Institute and at the University of Melbourne. He was also a visiting researcher at the Hebrew University of Jerusalem and the American University in Washington, DC. From 2021-2015 he was Associate Professor of Politics and International Relations at Murdoch University in Perth. He was a Specially Appointed Professor of Peace and Sustainability at Hiroshima University.

== Impact and awards ==
Media and decision makers have drawn on Ide's research. He was worked with the World Bank (Global Facility for Disaster Risk Reduction), the United Nations (UN Economic and Social Council), NATO, the European Union, and the United States Holocaust Memorial Museum, among others. Ide's work featured in many news articles, including in the Atlantic, CTV News, de Volkskrant, Publico, Schweizer Radio und Fernsehen (SRF), Courthouse News Service, and in podcasts like Policy, Guns & Money, POLIS180, and New Books in World Affairs.

Ide received several awards for his research. These include:

- named Australia's top research in the field of Diplomacy and International Relations by The Australian in 2025,
- the 2023 Emerging Peace Studies Scholar Award of the International Studies Association,
- the 2023 International Science Prize for Peace and Ecology in the Anthropocene (awarded by the Hans Günter Brauch Foundation),
- the 2022 Enhancing the Environmental Peacebuilding Knowledge Base Award (awarded by the Environmental Peacebuilding Association.

Ide is a director of the Environmental Peacebuilding Association and editor of the journal Environment and Security.

== Selected publications ==
- Ide, Tobias (2023): Catastrophes, confrontations, and constraints: how disasters shape the dynamics of armed conflicts. Cambridge, MA: MIT Press.
- Ide, Tobias (2023): Rise or recede? How climate disasters affect armed conflict intensity. International Security 47(4), pp. 50–78.
- Ide, Tobias, McKenzie F. Johnson, Jon Barnett, Florian Krampe, Philippe Le Billon, Lucile Maertens, Nina von Uexkull and Irene Vélez-Torres (2023): The future of environmental peace and conflict research. Environmental Politics 32(6), pp. 1077–1103.
- Ide, Tobias and Patrick A. Mello (2022): QCA in International Relations: a review of strengths, pitfalls, and empirical applications. International Studies Review 24(1), p. viac008.
- Ge, Quansheng, Mengmeng Hao, Fangyu Ding, Dong Jiang, Jürgen Scheffran, David Helman and Tobias Ide (2022): Modelling armed conflict risk under climate change with machine learning and time-series data. Nature Communications 13(1), p. 2839.
- Ide, Tobias (2021): COVID-19 and armed conflict. World Development 140(1), p. 105355.
- Ide, Tobias, Carl Bruch, Alexander Carius, Ken Conca, Geoffrey D. Dabelko, Richard Matthew and Erica Weinthal (2021): The past and future(s) of environmental peacebuilding. International Affairs 97(1), pp. 1–16.
- Ide, Tobias, Juan Miguel Rodriguez Lopez, Christiane Fröhlich and Jürgen Scheffran (2021): Pathways to water conflict during drought in the MENA region. Journal of Peace Research 58(3), pp. 568–582.
- Ide, Tobias, Lisa Palmer and Jon Barnett (2021): Environmental peacebuilding from below: customary approaches in Timor-Leste. International Affairs 97(1), pp. 103–118.
- Ide, Tobias (2020): The dark side of environmental peacebuilding. World Development 127(1), p. 104777.
- Ide, Tobias, Michael Brzoska, Jonathan F. Donges and Carl-Friedrich Schleussner (2020): Multi-method evidence for when and how climate-related disasters contribute to armed conflict risk. Global Environmental Change 62(1), p. 102063.
- Ide, Tobias and Amit Tubi (2020): Education and environmental peacebuilding: insights from three projects in Israel and Palestine. Annals of the Association of American Geographers 110(1), pp. 1–17.
- Wiederkehr, Charlotte, Tobias Ide, Ralf Seppelt and Kathleen Hermans (2022): It's all about politics: migration and resource conflicts in the global south. World Development 157(1), p. 105938.
- Ide, Tobias (2019): The impact of environmental cooperation on peacemaking: definitions, mechanisms and empirical evidence. International Studies Review 21(3), pp. 327–346.
- Ide, Tobias (2018): Does environmental peacemaking between states work? Insights on cooperative environmental agreements and reconciliation in international rivalries. Journal of Peace Research 55(3), pp. 351–365.
- Ide, Tobias and Adrien Detges (2018): International water cooperation and environmental peacemaking. Global Environmental Politics 18(4), pp. 63–84.
- Ide, Tobias (2018): Climate war in the Middle East? Drought, the Syrian civil war and the state of climate-conflict research. Current Climate Change Reports 4(4), pp. 347–354.
- Adams, Courtland, Tobias Ide, Jon Barnett and Adrien Detges (2018): Sampling bias in climate-conflict research. Nature Climate Change 8(3), pp. 200–203.
- Ide, Tobias (2017): Research methods for exploring the links between climate change and conflict. Wiley Interdisciplinary Reviews Climate Change 8(3), pp. 1–14.
- Ide, Tobias (2017): Space, discourse and environmental peacebuilding. Third World Quarterly 38(3), pp. 544–562.
- Ide, Tobias and Christiane Fröhlich (2015): Socio-environmental cooperation and conflict? A discursive understanding and its application to the case of Israel/Palestine. Earth System Dynamics 6(2), pp. 659–671.
- Ide, Tobias (2015): Why do conflicts over scarce renewable resources turn violent? A qualitative comparative analysis. Global Environmental Change 33(1), pp. 61–70.
- Ide, Tobias, Janpeter Schilling, Jasmin S. A. Link, Jürgen Scheffran, Grace Ngaruiya and Thomas Weinzierl (2014): On exposure, vulnerability and violence: spatial distribution of risk factors for climate change and violent conflict across Kenya and Uganda. Political Geography 43(1), pp. 68–81.
