= Florian Krampe =

German political scientist (born 1980)

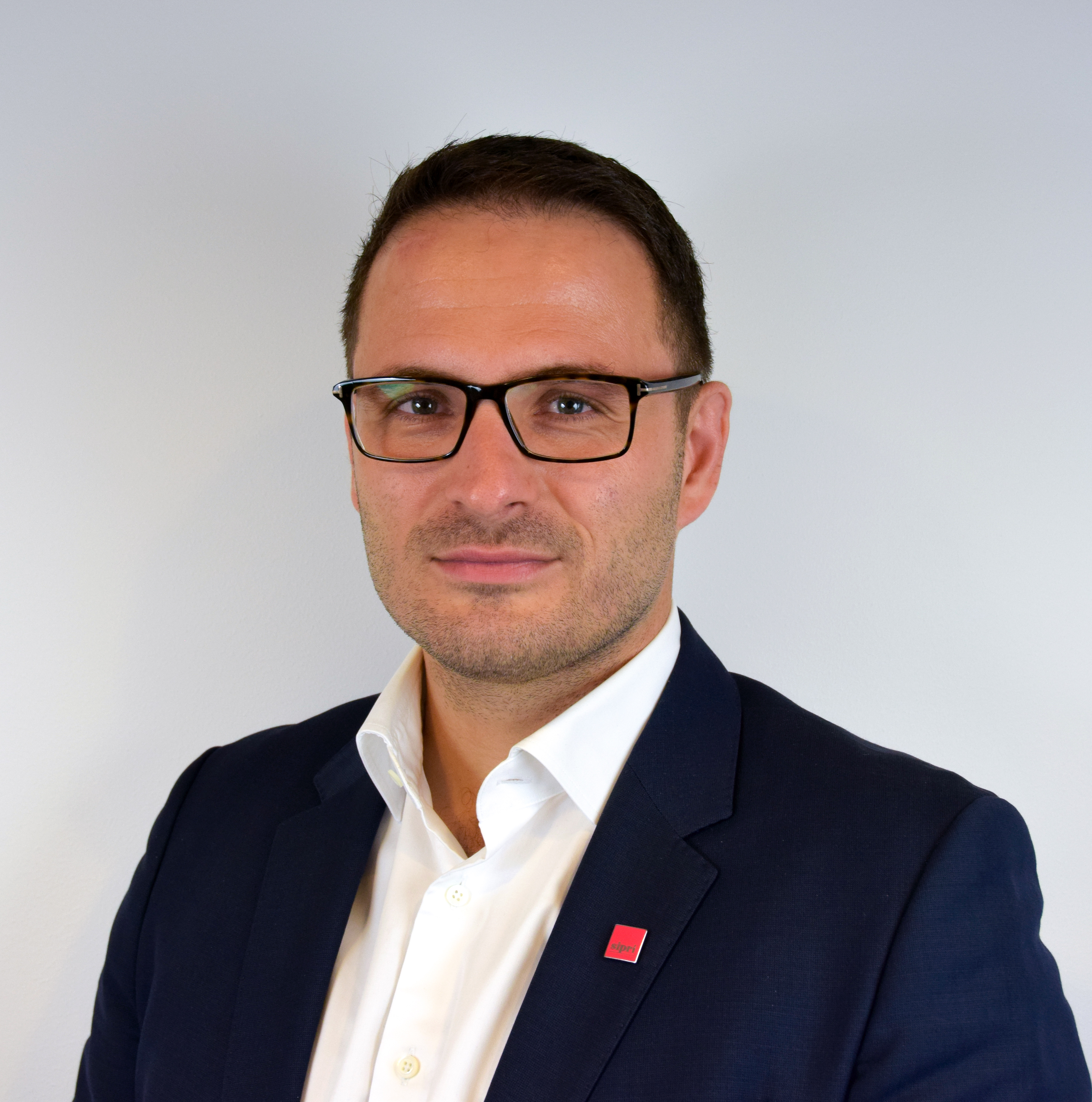
- Born: 1980 (age 45–46); Duisburg, Germany

Academic background
- Education: Uppsala University (MA) (PhD); Ruhr University Bochum (BA)

Academic work
- Main interests: International relations, climate security, Environmental Peacebuilding
- Website: www.sipri.org/about/bios/dr-florian-krampe

Florian Krampe (born 1980) is a German/Swedish political scientist and international relations scholar at the Stockholm International Peace Research Institute (SIPRI).^{[2]} He is best known for his work on climate-related security risks, Environmental Peacebuilding, and the governance of natural resources after armed conflict. He also serves as Affiliated Researcher at the Research School for International Water Cooperation at the Department of Peace and Conflict Research at Uppsala University. Between 2020 and 2022 Krampe was cross appointed Specially Appointed Professor at the Network for Education and Research on Peace and Sustainability at Hiroshima University, Japan.

== Research ==
Krampe's research interests include peace and conflict research, environmental and climate security, as well as international security. In his current research, he studies how climate change impacts the effectiveness of peacebuilding, showing that "Eight of the ten countries hosting the most multilateral peace operations personnel in 2018 are located in areas highly exposed to climate change." Krampe led one of the first studies explicitly looking at the impact of climate change on the success of the United Nations Assistance Mission in Somalia (UNSOM). The study shows that "The impacts of climate change have hindered UNSOM in its work to provide peace and security in Somalia and in its efforts to establish functioning governance and judicial systems." In February 2020 the findings of the study informed the UN Security Council discussions on Somalia. The study was followed in 2021 with an in-depth assessment focused on the United Nations Multidimensional Integrated Stabilization Mission in Mali.

Krampe is furthermore known for his research on post-conflict management of natural resources and environmental peacebuilding, focusing among others on peacebuilding potential of micro-hydropower development Nepal, as well as water supply management in Kosovo and East Timor. Theoretically, Krampe contributed to environmental peacebuilding by suggesting two dominant research perspectives: the cooperation perspective, driven by the potential of environmental cooperation to contribute to peace through spillover effects. This perspective focuses primarily on the interstate level and often on conflict prevention rather than post-conflict peacebuilding. In contrast, the resource risk perspective recognises resource-induced instability, especially after intrastate conflicts, and stresses the need to mitigate these risks to sustain the absence of violence (negative peace), through facilitating environmental cooperation. Together with Farah Hegazi and Stacy D. VanDeveer, Krampe suggested three mechanisms through which improved natural resource governance in post-conflict contexts is theorized to have positive effects on peace.

There are two camps in the literature on environmental peacebuilding: one focuses on environmental cooperation and the other on resource risk. The first one emphasis environmental cooperation as a way to build trust and facilitate the spill-over of cooperation between conflict parties, while the second one suggests that managing conflict resources and rebuilding livelihoods after a war are core for fostering peace and stability. Krampe has argued that it is key to build bridges between these two perspectives and develop and integrated research agenda.

== Career ==
Krampe received his PhD from Uppsala University in 2016. Since 2017 he is working in the climate change and risk programme at the Stockholm International Peace Research Institute (SIPRI). He has been visiting research fellow at the Pufendorf Institute of Advanced Studies, Lund University and a student fellow at the Peace Research Institute Oslo (PRIO). Since 2016, Krampe is an Affiliated Researcher at the Research School for International Water Cooperation at the Department of Peace and Conflict Research at Uppsala University. Krampe has published in, World Development, Global Environmental Politics and The Lancet Global Health as well as Cooperation and Conflict and Sustainability Science.

Krampe's expertise on climate security and environmental peacebuilding has informed intergovernmental organizations and policy actors. He has engaged among others with UN Environment, the African Union, the Food and Agriculture Organization of the United Nations (FAO), as well as the German Federal Foreign Office, the Swedish Ministry of Foreign Affairs and the Norwegian Foreign Ministry. Krampe's research has received coverage by major global news outlets, including New York Times, Washington Post, Deutsche Welle, Foreign Policy, Agence France-Presse, Hindustan Times, The Asahi Shimbun and CNBC Africa.

== Selected publications ==
- Simangan, D., Bose, S., Candelaria, J. L., Krampe, F., & Kaneko, S. (2023). Positive peace and environmental sustainability: Local evidence from Afghanistan and Nepal. Environment and Security, 1(3–4), 142–162.
- Ide T., Johnson M.F., Barnett J., Krampe, F., Le Billon, P., Maertens, L., von Uexkull, N. & Vélez-Torres, I. (2023) The future of environmental peace and conflict research. Environmental Politics, 32 (6), 1077–1103.
- Bremberg, N., Mobjörk, M., & Krampe, F. (2022). Global Responses to Climate Security: Discourses, Institutions and Actions. Journal of Peacebuilding & Development, 17(3), 341–356.
- Krampe, F., Smith, E. and Hamidi, D., Security implications of climate development in conflict-affected states - Implications of local-level effects of rural hydropower development on farmers in Herat. Political Geography. Volume 90 (October 2021).
- Krampe, F., Hegazi, F. and VanDeveer, S.D., Sustaining peace through better resource governance: Three potential mechanisms for environmental peacebuilding, World Development, Volume 144 (Aug 2021).
- Krampe, F. Why United Nations peace operations cannot ignore climate change (SIPRI, Stockholm: February 2021).
- Swatuk, L. A., Thomas B. K., Krampe F., et al., The 'boomerang effect': insights for improved climate action, Climate and Development (2020).
- Krampe, F., Climate change, peacebuilding and sustaining peace (SIPRI: June 2019)
- Smith, D. and Krampe, F., Climate-Related Security Risks in the Middle East, in Anders Jägerskog, Michael Schulz, and Ashok Swain (eds.) Routledge Handbook on Middle East Security, London: Routledge (2019)
- Krampe, F,. and Mobjörk, M., Responding to Climate-Related Security Risks: Reviewing Regional Organizations in Asia and Africa, Current Climate Change Reports (Oct 2018)
- Krampe, F. and Gignoux, S., Water Service Provision and Peacebuilding in East Timor – Exploring the socio-ecological determinants of sustaining peace, Journal of Intervention and Statebuilding, 12 (2): 185-207 (2018)
- Swatuk, L., Wirkus, L., Krampe, F., et al., The Boomerang Effect: Overview and Implications for Climate Governance in Swatuk, L. and Wirkus, L. (Eds) Water, Climate Change and the Boomerang Effect: Unintentional Consequences for Resource Insecurity, London & New York: Earthscan (2018)
- Krampe, F. Towards Sustainable Peace: A New Research Agenda for Post-Conflict Natural Resource Management, Global Environmental Politics 17 (4)
- Stoett, P., Daszak, P., Romanelli, C. et al. Avoiding catastrophes: seeking synergies among the public health, environmental protection, and human security sectors, The Lancet Global Health, 4(10), e680–e681 (2016)
- Krampe, F. Water for peace? Post-conflict water resource management in Kosovo, Cooperation and Conflict (2016)
- Krampe, F. Empowering Peace: Service Provision and State legitimacy in Peacebuilding in Nepal, Conflict, Security, and Development 16 (1): 53-73 (2016)
- Swain, A. and Krampe, F. Stability and Sustainability in Peace Building: Priority Area for Warfare Ecology in Machlis, G. E., Hanson, T., Špirić, Z. and Mckendry, J. E. (eds.) Warfare Ecology (Springer Netherlands) 199–210. (2011)
