= Erika Weinthal =

American environmental policy scholar

- Scientific career
- Fields: Environment
- Workplaces: Duke University

Erika Weinthal is an American environmental policy scholar currently the John O. Blackburn distinguished professor of Environmental Policy at Duke University. Her work focuses on global environmental change, environmental peacebuilding, and climate change adaptation, employing global governance and political economy perspectives.

== Work ==
Weinthal has studied environmental and natural resource governance in various world regions, including the Middle East, North Africa and Central Asia.

She has cooperated with the United Nations Environment Programme to analyse the role of natural resources in post-conflict peacebuilding. In particular, she showed how access to water can help to rebuild livelihoods and address grievances after civil wars, while inadequate water management can fuel political tensions and undermine peace.

Together with Jeannie Sowers, Weinthal has collected data on attacks on food, water and health infrastructure in Syria and Yemen, Gaza and the West Bank, and Libya. She shows that such attacks are increasing in frequency and are used by civil war parties to punish civilian populations, cause disruptions in enemy territory, and gain control over valuable resources. Recovering such infrastructure will be key to post-conflict environmental peacebuilding.

Weinthal formerly edited the journal Global Environmental Politics and is currently the editor of Environment and Security. She also served as the founding Vice-President and is currently the President of the Environmental Peacebuilding Association.
