= Peter Dauvergne =

Peter Dauvergne is a Canadian writer and environmentalist. He is Professor of International Relations at the University of British Columbia.

== Academic life ==
His 22 books and more than 100 journal articles and book chapters have been translated into Arabic, Chinese, Japanese, Spanish, Portuguese, Korean, Persian/Farsi, and French, among other languages.

His 1997 book, Shadows in the Forest, has been described as the first to explain "in intricate and devastating detail" the role of Japanese corporations and trade in the politics of deforestation in Southeast Asia. This book won the International Studies Association's 1998 Sprout Award for the best book in international environmental affairs. Dauvergne's 2001 book, Loggers and Degradation in the Asia-Pacific, includes case studies from the Philippines, Indonesia, Sabah and Sarawak in Malaysia, the Solomon Islands and Vanuatu, and according to a review, the "account is at once both scholarly and muckraking."

Dauvergne went on to research the consequences of consumption for global environmental change, as in his 2005 book with Jennifer Clapp, Paths to a Green World. He followed this with The Shadows of Consumption, which won the 2009 Gerald L. Young Book Award in Human Ecology. This book developed the metaphor of "ecological shadows" to discuss the global harm caused to the environment by high levels of consumption in the developed world, and rising levels of consumption in the developing world.

After serving as an associate dean at UBC (2006-2008) and then as senior advisor to UBC President Stephen Toope (2008-2009), Dauvergne became director of the Liu Institute for Global Issues (2009-2014). He subsequently wrote Eco-Business (MIT Press, 2013, coauthored with Jane Lister), Protest Inc. (Polity Press, 2014, coauthored with Genevieve LeBaron), and Environmentalism of the Rich (MIT Press, 2016). In the latter book, he "mourns the loss of the spirit of outrage in mainstream environmentalism, especially concerned that the biggest global environmental groups have muted their campaigns and become less radical.". In 2020, he published AI in the Wild: Sustainability in the Age of Artificial Intelligence (MIT Press), and in 2022 he published Identified, Tracked, and Profiled: The Politics of Resisting Facial Recognition Technology (Edward Elgar Publishing).

In 2000, Dauvergne was the founding editor of the Global Environmental Politics journal.

== Private life ==
He is a chess master with an international FIDE rating of 2232. He is also the author of a popular article on why studying and playing chess can increase intelligence.

== Awards ==
In 1998, the Environmental Studies Section of the International Studies Association honored Dauvergne's book "Shadows in the Forest: Japan and the Politics of Timber in Southeast Asia" with the Harold & Margaret Sprout Award.

In 2016, the Environmental Studies Section of the International Studies Association presented Dauvergne with its Distinguished Scholar Award.

In 2017, he received the American Political Science Association's Michael Harrington Award for his book, Environmentalism of the Rich. This award is awarded for "an outstanding book that demonstrates how scholarship can be used in the struggle for a better world".

In 2018, he was inducted as a Fellow of the Royal Society of Canada (FRSC).

== Books ==
- Dauvergne, Peter; Shipton, Leah, eds. (2023), Global Environmental Politics in a Turbulent Era, Cheltenham, UK: Edward Elgar, ISBN 978-1802207132.
- Dauvergne, Peter (2023), Identified, Tracked, and Profiled: The Politics of Resisting Facial Recognition Technology, Cheltenham, UK: Edward Elgar, ISBN 978-1803925882.
- Dauvergne, Peter (2020), AI in the Wild: Sustainability in the Age of Artificial Intelligence, Cambridge, Massachusetts: The MIT Press, ISBN 978-0262539333.
- Dauvergne, Peter (2018), Will Big Business Destroy Our Planet?, Cambridge, UK: Polity Press, ISBN 978-1509524006.
- Dauvergne, Peter; Alger, Justin, eds. (2018), A Research Agenda for Global Environmental Politics, Cheltenham, UK: Edward Elgar, ISBN 978-1789902181.
- Dauvergne, Peter (2016), Environmentalism of the Rich, Cambridge, Massachusetts: The MIT Press, ISBN 978-0262034951.
- Dauvergne, Peter; LeBaron, Genevieve (2014), "Protest Inc.: The Corporatization of Activism", Environmental Politics, vol. 23, Cambridge, UK: Polity, p. 1115, Bibcode:2014EnvPo..23.1115S, doi:10.1080/09644016.2014.939422, ISBN 978-0745669496, S2CID 155036401.
- Dauvergne, Peter; Lister, Jane (2013), Eco-Business: A Big-Brand Takeover of Sustainability, Cambridge, Massachusetts: The MIT Press, ISBN 978-0262018760.
- Dauvergne, Peter, ed. (2013), Environmental Politics, Cheltenham, UK: Edward Elgar, ISBN 978-1781009017.
- Dauvergne, Peter; Lister, Jane (2011), Timber, Cambridge, UK: Polity Press, ISBN 978-0745649283.
- Dauvergne, Peter (2008), The Shadows of Consumption: Consequences for the Global Environment, Cambridge, Massachusetts: The MIT Press, ISBN 978-0262042468. Recipient of the 2009 Gerald L. Young Book Award in Human Ecology.
- Dauvergne, Peter (2009), Historical Dictionary of Environmentalism, Lanham, Maryland: Scarecrow, ISBN 978-0810858046. Published in paperback as Dauvergne, Peter (2009), The A to Z of Environmentalism, Lanham, Mayland: Scarecrow, ISBN 978-0810871526. Second Edition in 2016.
- Dauvergne, Peter; Clapp, Jennifer (2005), Paths to a Green World: The Political Economy of the Global Environment, Cambridge, Massachusetts: The MIT Press, ISBN 978-0262532716. Second Edition in 2011. Japanese Translation in 2008.
- Dauvergne, Peter, ed. (2005), Handbook of Global Environmental Politics, Cheltenham, UK: Edward Elgar, ISBN 978-1781005446. Second edition, 2012.
- Dauvergne, Peter (2001), Loggers and Degradation in the Asia-Pacific: Corporations and Environmental Management, Cambridge, UK: Cambridge University Press, ISBN 978-0521001342.
- Dauvergne, Peter, ed. (1998), Weak and Strong States in Asia-Pacific Societies, Sydney: Allen and Unwin, ISBN 978-1863739832.
- Dauvergne, Peter (1997), Shadows in the Forest: Japan and the Politics of Timber in Southeast Asia, Cambridge, Massachusetts: The MIT Press, ISBN 978-0262540872.
