= Environmental Change and Security Program =

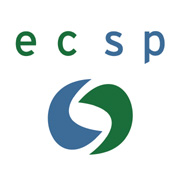

The Environmental Change and Security Program (ECSP) is one of several programs and projects that make up the Global Resilience and Sustainability Program at the Woodrow Wilson International Center for Scholars. ECSP was founded in 1994 to study the connections among environmental, health, population dynamics and their links to conflict, human insecurity, and foreign policy.

== Activities ==
ECSP holds events and publishes research and multimedia content aiming to connect scholars, policymakers, the media, and practitioners. The program currently has three primary topical focus areas:

1. Integrated Development: The intersection of population-health-environment issues in developing countries as well as global population dynamics such as urbanisation, youth bulges, and migration.
2. Environment, Conflict, and Security: The role of natural resources in conflict and peace building, and climate change in the security context.
3. Water: Water's potential to spur conflict and cooperation, its social and economic value, and its relationship to health and disease.

== Publications ==
ECSP produces a series of program reports as well as the FOCUS series of short briefs on integrated population, health, and environment programs. Previous occasional publications include Navigating Peace: Forging New Water Partnerships and Water Stories: Expanding Opportunities in Small-Scale Water and Sanitation Projects. The program also maintains a daily blog, New Security Beat, and a YouTube channel with speaker interviews.

== Support ==
ECSP is supported by grants from the U.S. Agency for International Development, under the Health, Environment, Livelihoods, Population, and Security (HELPS) Project and the Resources for Peace Project (RFPP).

== Staff ==
- Roger-Mark De Souza, Global Fellow and former Director
- Geoff Dabelko, Senior Adviser and former Director
- Lauren Herzer, Program Associate
- John Thon Majok, Program Associate
- Meaghan Parker, Writer/Editor
- Benjamin Dills, Program Assistant
