= Randall Amster =

American author, activist and educator (born 1965)

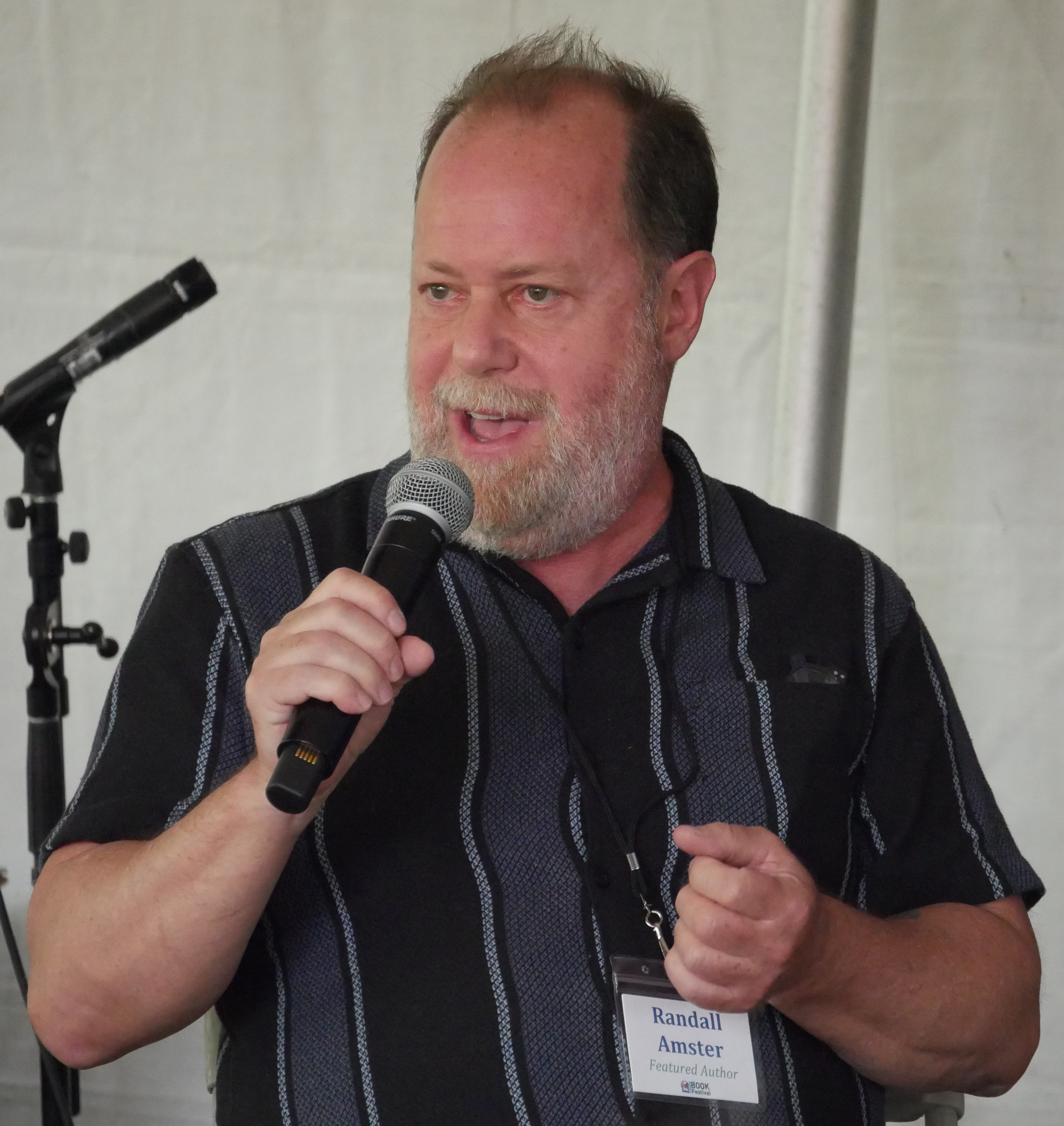
- at the 2026 Gaithersburg Book Festival
- Born: Randall Jay Amster; September 5, 1965 (age 61); New York City, U.S.
- Education: University of Rochester (BS); Brooklyn Law School (JD); Arizona State University (PhD)
- Occupations: Teacher, writer

Randall Jay Amster (born September 5, 1965) is an American author, activist, and educator in areas including peace, ecology, homelessness, and anarchism. He is the co-director of the Environmental Studies program at Georgetown University, and writes for outlets ranging from academic journals to online news media. Amster has worked as an attorney, judicial clerk, university lecturer and academic administrator.

== Career ==
In 2001, Amster was hired to teach Peace Studies at Prescott College in Arizona, where he worked as a faculty member and program chair until June 2013. In 2008, he began serving as the executive director of the Peace and Justice Studies Association (PJSA). He is the editor of the association's newsletter, The Peace Chronicle, among other duties. Amster also serves on the editorial advisory boards for academic journals including the Contemporary Justice Review, the Journal of Sustainability Education, and the Asian Journal of Peacebuilding, In August 2013, Amster became the director of the Program on Justice and Peace at Georgetown University, where he presently teaches.

== Activism ==
During his time at Arizona State University, Amster was engaged in a number of well-reported and controversial activist endeavors. He led an effort to overturn an ordinance making it a criminal offense to sit on the local sidewalks, arguing the case before a federal judge and winning an injunction against enforcement of the law before it was overturned on appeal.

Amster organized "sit-in" demonstrations against the ordinance, which he argued was aimed primarily at the local homeless population. He also helped to spearhead a successful campaign to preserve one of the last remaining open spaces in downtown Tempe, Arizona. These efforts resulted in a number of articles, editorials, and interviews about his work – including an extensive Phoenix New Times portrayal in 2000 and also formed the basis for his doctoral dissertation, which subsequently yielded two books on these themes of public space and nonviolence.

He was featured in Jeff Ferrell's 2001 book Tearing Down the Streets: Adventures in Urban Anarchy as a practitioner of nonviolent "anarchist direct action" in the effort to "reclaim public space" in downtown Tempe.

Amster, a critic of military adventurism and an interventionist foreign policy, has been a vocal opponent of the wars in Iraq and Afghanistan since their inception; he was part of a local group engaging in civil disobedience when the Iraq War began in March 2003, resulting in a trial later that year during which he acted as lead attorney for the group as they invoked a "necessity defense" in light of their assertion of the war's illegality under international law.

He engaged in grassroots relief efforts in New Orleans and the Gulf Coast following Hurricane Katrina in 2005, working with Food Not Bombs and local collectives in the region. Amster has worked with the Catalyst Infoshop in Prescott, Arizona, and was part of a group that supported founder Bill Rodgers during the course of his arrest, prosecution, and eventual death in jail in December 2005 on charges of ecoterrorist arson attacks.

From 2005 to 2007, Amster was part of a legal observer initiative on the U.S.-Mexico border that monitored the activities of the Minuteman Project. In 2008, he received an award for Entertainment Program of the Year for hosting and producing a local television program on politics and culture, The Artist's Mind.

Following the passage of Arizona's immigration law, SB 1070 in April 2010, Amster began to refocus his activism. He authored a series of articles on Arizona, and helped spearhead an initiative that brought together more than a dozen academic and professional associations in issuing a joint statement condemning SB 1070 and related state policies. After a federal judge blocked parts of SB 1070 from taking effect in July 2010, Amster's editorial on the ruling was excerpted by USA Today. His editorial argued that "there is a sense of vindication and relief on the part of many who have been working for justice in regard to immigration issues." In the ensuing months, he continued to write on related topics.

== Writing and scholarship ==
Amster's writing covers a range of topics and themes. His work on homelessness and public spaces have resulted in two books, including Lost in Space: The Criminalization, Globalization, and Urban Ecology of Homelessness (LFB Scholarly, 2008), which was called "a savvy look into local and global processes of neoliberalization, particularly as it transforms what it means to be a citizen" in a 2011 review appearing in Antipode: A Radical Journal of Geography. An earlier co-edited volume, with Pat Lauderdale, focusing on issues of injustice and inequality, was published in 1997. A later co-edited work, with Elavie Ndura, focused on the theme of "building cultures of peace," and was released by Cambridge Scholars Publishing in 2009. Amster was also part of the editorial collective that produced Contemporary Anarchist Studies, published by Routledge in 2009 and recipient of the Critics Choice Award that year for "recent scholarship deemed to be outstanding in its field" by the American Educational Studies Association. The sole-authored book Anarchism Today was published by Praeger in 2012 and was described by the Philadelphia City Paper as "a much-needed contemporary read."

Amster is also the author of numerous journal articles and book chapters on various subjects. social movements, critical pedagogy, eco-terrorism, border issues, post-Katrina New Orleans, and Peace Ecology. In addition, he is a frequent blogger and op-ed columnist, writing on similar themes in venues including online media such as The Huffington Post Amster's work continues to focus on social and ecological issues.

Amster launched an initiative in January 2011 called "New Clear Vision" (NCV), a website where Amster serves as a Contributing Editor, and includes Devon G. Pena, Jay Walljasper, Pat LaMarche, David Swanson, Diane Lefer, and Robert C. Koehler among its regular contributors. The site's stated intention is "to advance a multiplicity of views on what people are standing for, rather than merely highlighting what they’re against," and seeks to foster "a constructive take on politics, ecology, economy, community, family, culture, and current events."

== Bibliography ==
=== Books ===
- Lauderdale, Pat; Amster, Randall (1997), Lives in the balance: Perspectives on global injustice and inequality, International studies in sociology and social anthropology, v. 66, Leiden, ISBN 978-90-04-10875-2, OCLC 36746461
- Amster, Randall (2004), Street people and the contested realms of public space, Criminal justice (LFB Scholarly Publishing LLC), LFB Scholarly Pub, ISBN 978-1-59332-066-9
- Amster, Randall (2008), Lost in space: The criminalization, globalization, and urban ecology of homelessness, LFB Scholarly Publishing, ISBN 978-1-59332-297-7, OCLC 221150739
- Amster, Randall; et al. (2009), Contemporary anarchist studies: An introductory anthology of anarchy in the academy, Routledge, ISBN 978-0-203-89173-5, OCLC 239236182
- Ndura-Ouédraogo, Elavie; Amster, Randall (2009), Building cultures of peace: Transdisciplinary voices of hope and action, Cambridge Scholars, ISBN 978-1-4438-1329-7, OCLC 435734902
- Amster, Randall (2012), Anarchism today, Praeger, ISBN 978-0-313-39872-8, OCLC 745980493
- Valado, Trenna; Amster, Randall (2012), Professional lives, personal struggles: Ethics and advocacy in research on homelessness, Lexington Books, ISBN 978-0-739-17428-9, OCLC 785874881
- Amster, Randall; Ndura, Elavie (2013), Exploring the power of nonviolence: Peace, politics, and practice, Syracuse University Press, ISBN 978-0-815-63344-0, OCLC 872675972
- Amster, Randall (2014), Peace ecology, Paradigm, ISBN 978-1-612-05297-7, OCLC 861068931

=== Academic articles ===
- Lauderdale, P; Amster, R (1997), "Critical Perspectives on Justice: The Persistence of Global Injustice and Inequality", International Journal of Comparative Sociology, 38 (1): 1–5, doi:10.1177/002071529703800101, ISSN 0020-7152, OCLC 198749555, S2CID 220899913, archived from the original on June 4, 2011 – via Questia
- Amster, Randall (2002), "Anarchist Pedagogies for Peace", Peace Review, 14 (4): 433–439, doi:10.1080/1040265022000039222, S2CID 145787263
- Amster, Randall (2003), "Patterns of Exclusion: Sanitizing Space, Criminalizing Homelessness", Social Justice, 30 (1): 195, ISSN 1043-1578, OCLC 96219391, archived from the original on 2011-06-04 – via Questia
- Amster, R (2003), "Restoring (Dis)Order: Sanctions, Resolutions, and "Social Control" in Anarchist Communities", Contemporary Justice Review, 6 (1): 9–24, doi:10.1080/1028258032000055612, S2CID 145108567
- Amster, Randall (2006), "Perspectives on Ecoterrorism: Catalysts, Conflations, and Casualties", Contemporary Justice Review, 9 (3): 287–301, doi:10.1080/10282580600827991, S2CID 144582327
- Starr, Amory; Fernandez, Luis; Amster, Randall; Wood, Lesley (2008), "The Impacts of State Surveillance on Political Assembly and Association: A Socio-Legal Analysis", Qualitative Sociology, 31 (3): 251–270, doi:10.1007/s11133-008-9107-z, S2CID 145385477
- Amster, Randall (2009), "Repeal NAFTA, Adopt LAFTA", Peace Review, 20 (4): 448–454, doi:10.1080/10402650802495049, S2CID 145648497
- Amster, Randall (2012), "Just, in Time: Cultivating the Long Arc of Justice", Contemporary Justice Review, 15 (2): 1–6, doi:10.1080/10282580.2012.681163, S2CID 143565318
- Amster, Randall (2013), "Toward a Climate of Peace", Peace Review, 25 (4): 473–479, doi:10.1080/10402659.2013.846129, S2CID 144044412
- Amster, Randall (2014), "Teaching to the Test: Climate Change, Perpetual War, and the Pedagogy of Hopefulness", Journal of Peace Education, 11 (3): 267–278, doi:10.1080/17400201.2014.954362, S2CID 143722964

Reviews

- Review: Globalization and Its Discontents Archived 2011-07-09 at the Wayback Machine The New Formulation, Volume 2, Issue 1, February 2003
- Review: Breaking the Law: Anti-authoritarian Visions of Crime and Justice Archived 2010-04-12 at the Wayback Machine The New Formulation, Volume 2, Issue 2, Winter-Spring 2004
- Review: Less Than Two Dollars a Day: A Christian View of World Poverty and the Free Market Journal of Church and State, Volume 51, Issue 1, pages 157–9, 2009
- Policing Dissent: Social Control and the Anti-globalization Movement Contemporary Justice Review, Volume 13, Issue 4, pages 487–9, 2010
- Review: A Living Revolution: Anarchism in the Kibbutz Movement Shofar: An Interdisciplinary Journal of Jewish Studies, Volume 29, Issue 3, pages 175–7, 2011
- Review: Toward Climate Justice: Perspectives on the Climate Crisis and Social Change Archived 2012-10-12 at the Wayback Machine Z Magazine, Volume 24, Issue 5, May 2011.
