= Environment Strategy and Administration in Nigeria =

Environment Strategy and Administration in Nigeria

Environmental change is one of the most squeezing worldwide difficulties within recent memory, and Nigeria, as Africa's most crowded country and perhaps of its biggest economy, has chosen to address the issue through environment strategy and administration drives.

== Strategy structure ==
Nigeria has fostered an exhaustive strategy system to direct its reaction to environmental change. The Public Environmental Change Strategy and Reaction System (NCCPRS), founded in 2012, forms the foundation of the country's environment activity plan. The NCCPRS frames systems for relief, transformation, and limit building.

== Worldwide responsibilities ==
Nigeria is a signatory to accords on environmental change, such as the Paris Agreement.

Nigeria has presented its Broadly Resolved Commitments (NDCs), framing its objectives and systems to lessen discharges and adjust to environmental change.
