= Krampe =

Krampe is a German language surname. Notable people with the name include:

- Florian Krampe (born 1980), German-Swedish political scientist
- Hans-Dieter Krampe (1937–2019), East German footballer
- Hugh Charles Krampe (1925–2016), American actor and humanitarian

== See also ==
- Kramp
