= Ken Conca =

American academic

Ken Conca is an American professor of international relations specializing in global environmental politics, including peacebuilding, water politics and governance, and the United Nations. Since 2010, he has worked at the Department of Environment, Development & Health, at the School of International Service of the American University in Washington, D.C. He is the author of multiple award winning books, and has received numerous awards for his teaching and service at American University. He is also known for helping to initiate the environmental peacebuilding field, together with co-author Geoff Dabelko.

== Education ==
Conca studied geological Science at Brown University, and completed his undergraduate degree in 1982. He then obtained an MS at the University of Wisconsin-Madison, and a PhD from the University of California, Berkeley.

== Awards and honors ==
- 2003 Harold & Margaret Sprout Award of the International Studies Association for his co-authored book "Confronting Consumption"
- 2006 Chadwick F. Alger Prize of the International Studies Association for his book "Governing Water: Contentious Transnational Politics and Global Institution Building"
- 2006 Harold & Margaret Sprout Award for his book "Governing Water: Contentious Transnational Politics and Global Institution Building"
- 2006 Elmer Plischke Faculty Research Award in Political Science
- 2018 Al-Moumin Award (and distinguished lecture) together with Geoff Dabelko "for their outstanding contributions to environmental peacebuilding" from the Environmental Peacebuilding Association
- 2021 Grawemeyer Award winner for "Ideas Improving World Order" for his book "An Unfinished Foundation: The United Nations and Global Environmental Governance"
