= Jennifer Clapp =

Canadian political economist

- Born: December 6, 1963 (age 62)

Academic background
- Education: B.A., University of Michigan; MSc., PhD, London School of Economics
- Thesis: African agricultural transformation and the World Bank: the case of Guinea 1984-90. (1992)

Academic work
- Institutions: York University; Trent University; University of Waterloo
- Main interests: Global Environmental Politics; Global Governance; Agriculture; Food Security
- Website: uwaterloo.ca/scholar/jclapp/home

Jennifer Ann Clapp FRSC (born December 6, 1963) is a Canadian political economist. She is a Professor and Canada Research Chair in Global Food Security and Sustainability at the University of Waterloo.

== Education ==
Clapp earned her Bachelor of Arts in Economics from the University of Michigan and her master's degree and PhD in International Political Economy from the London School of Economics.

== Career ==
After conducting her post-doctoral fellowship at Cambridge University, Clapp returned to North America and accepted an Associate Professor position at York University. She later joined the faculty at Trent University, where she taught courses regarding shrinking the Global Food Supply Chain. While there, she also received funding from the Social Sciences and Humanities Research Council to help Canadians " improve their quality of life." Clapp joined the faculty of Environment at the University of Waterloo in 2005. A few years later, while still at Waterloo, Clapp edited "The Global Food Crisis: Governance Challenges and Opportunities" with Marc J. Cohen.

From 2008 until 2012, Clapp served as co-editor of the journal Global Environmental Politics. In her last year as co-editor, Clapp published "Hunger in the Balance: The New Politics of International Food Aid" and "Food." Her book "Food" focused on what contributes to society that influences and shape the current global food system, with a specific interest on industrial agriculture, corporate control, inequitable agricultural trade rules, and the financialization of food. Similarly, her book "Hunger in the Balance: The New Politics of International Food Aid" focused on the politics of food aid with a specific focus on contemporary clashes between donors and recipients. It was also shortlisted for the Donner Prize, an award given to a book considered to be excellent in regard to the writing of Canadian public policy. She would also be appointed Associate Dean of Research on January 1, 2012 and win the Canadian Association for Food Studies Award for Excellence in Research.

The year after her last term, Clapp was appointed a Tier 1 Canada Research Chair in Global Food Security and Sustainability, and was the recipient of a Trudeau fellowship for her work in global environmental and food policy. In 2014, Clapp was the recipient of Waterloo's Excellence in Graduate Supervision Award. Two years later, she was elected a Fellow of the Royal Society of Canada for her contributions to global environmental politics and international food security.

By 2017, Clapp was honoured as with Waterloo's Outstanding Performance Award. The next year, she received the Royal Society of Canada's Innis-Gérin Medal for enriching social sciences literature, and the Distinguished Scholar Award of the Environmental Studies Section of the International Studies Association.
