= Norman Myers =

British environmentalist (1934–2019)

Norman Myers CMG (24 August 1934 – 20 October 2019) was a British environmentalist specialising in biodiversity and also noted for his work on environmental refugees.

== Biography ==
Myers was born in Whitewell (Lancashire, then Yorkshire) and was raised until the age of 11 on the family farm, without electricity, gas or an internal toilet. He lived in Kenya for over 30 years and later settled in Headington, Oxford, England. He attended Clitheroe Royal Grammar School and then the University of Oxford (BA in French and German, Keble College 1958; MA 1963) and became a District Officer in the last few years of the Kenya Administration from 1958 to 1961. He then worked as a high school teacher in Nairobi from 1961 to 1966 and as a freelance writer and broadcaster until 1969. He spoke Swahili, Masai, French and German. In 1972, after PhD studies at the University of California, Berkeley (graduated 1973), he became a consultant for the UN, the World Bank and other organisations, remaining in Kenya until the early 1980s.

In 1965, he married Dorothy Halliman. They separated in 1993 and divorced in 2012. He is survived by their two daughters, Malindi and Mara, and grandchildren. Mara Yamauchi is a retired marathon runner who was raised in Kenya until the age of 8.

He died in Oxford on 20 October 2019 after a long battle with dementia and Parkinson's.

== Career ==
Myers was an advisor to organisations including the United Nations, the World Bank, scientific academies in several countries, and various government administrations worldwide. He was an Honorary Visiting Fellow at Green College, Oxford University, and an adjunct professor at Duke University and the University of Vermont. Other vising academic appointments were at Harvard, Cornell, Stanford, Berkeley, Michigan and Texas Universities. He is a patron of London-based population concern charity Population Matters.

Myers's work ranged over diverse critical global issues and includes 18 books and over 250 scientific papers, produced while working as a consultant and in temporary academic posts. In the late 1970s, his work addressed rapidly accelerating decline of tropical forests. His estimates were later verified through satellite imagery. In the early 1980s Myers addressed the issue of deforestation in the context of land conversion for cattle production, a process that he called the "hamburger connection", showing the international linkages between industrial food production and environmental decline.

He did some of the early work on biodiversity, highlighting the critical importance of "biodiversity hotspots" – regions that are home to a disproportionately high number of species. This work was cited when he was named 2007 Time Magazine Hero of the Environment. Myers proposed, (in Nature, an article published in 2000 and cited 19,000 times by 2017) that these hotspots should be the focus of preservation efforts as a way to cut the rates of mass extinction and this strategy has been adopted by global conservation organisations raising hundreds of millions of dollars to date – by some estimates the largest amounts ever assigned to a single conservation strategy.

He wrote an influential book Ultimate Security: The Environmental Basis of Political Stability that was an early contribution to the field of environmental security and how environmental factors influence local and international politics. Together with Jennifer Kent, he wrote Perverse Subsidies (published in 1997 by the International Institute for Sustainable Development; rev. edition, 2001) that highlighted how large-scale government intervention in the form of subsidies, both direct and indirect, can lead to adverse rather than beneficial effects on society and the environment. Also in 1997, he published Environmental Refugees, warning that there might be 50 million environmental refugees by 2010 "if not before."

== Criticism ==
Myers's widely cited work on 'climate refugees' has been criticised by social scientists, and migration scholars in particular. Professor Myers himself admitted that his estimates, although calculated from the best available data, required some "heroic extrapolations", In April 2011, the UN was reported to have distanced itself from Myers's forecasts in 2005 that the total number of climate refugees would reach 50 million by 2010. One academic has stated that "my understanding is that Norman Myers looked at a map of the world, and he said which are the hotspots that we think are going to be affected by climate change; then he looked up the projected populations for those areas in 2010 and 2050 and added them up.... That's how he got to such a figure, because he didn't take into account that some people wouldn't move." Populations continue to rise in many regions, with one effect being attempts at migration. Other estimates place the number of climate refugees in the tens of thousands.

== Honours ==
- Cornell University's Andrew D. White Professor-at-Large, 1990-1996
- Blue Planet Prize (1991)
- Volvo Environment Prize (1992)
- Pew Fellow in Environment (1994)
- Foreign Associate, US National Academy of Sciences (1994)
- UNEP Environment Prize, Sasakawa Award (1995)
- Companion (CMG), Order of St. Michael and St. George, Queen's Honours (1998)
- Honorary doctorate, University of Kent (2003)
- Fellow, American Association for the Advancement of Science
- Fellow, World Academy of Art and Science
- Fellow, Linnean Society of London
- Fellow, Royal Society of Arts, London
- Global 500 Roll of Honour, United Nations Environment Programme
- Gold Medal, World Wildlife Fund International
- Order and Knight of the Golden Ark, Netherlands
