= Arthur H. Westing =

American ecologist (1928–2020)

Arthur H. Westing (July 18, 1928 – April 30, 2020) was an American ecologist. He was a longtime researcher at the Stockholm International Peace Research Institute.

== Biography ==
Westing was born in Brooklyn, New York on July 18, 1928, to Dr. Siegfried W. Westing and Paula (Riesenfeld) Westing. Growing up in Brooklyn, he was an Eagle Scout, which instilled in him a love for nature and the environment. Westing then graduated from Columbia University in 1950 with a B.A. in botany and served in the United States Marine Corps during the Korean War. He returned to the United States after the war and earned his master's degree in forestry and doctorate in plant physiology and ecology from Yale University.

Westing taught at a number of academic institutions, including Purdue University, Middlebury College, Hampshire College, Windham College, and the University of Massachusetts Amherst. He received a Guggenheim Fellowship in 1973.

From 1975 to 1987, Westing was a member of the research staff of the Stockholm International Peace Research Institute. His research focused on the military impact of the environment and was considered an expert in the field of environmental security. He also worked for Peace Research Institute Oslo from 1988 to 1990, where he worked on his project on ‘Peace, Security, and Environment’ funded by the United Nations Environment Programme. He was a visiting professor at the European Peace University and Durham University.

Westing died on April 30, 2020, in Shelburne, Vermont.
