= Environmental peacebuilding =

Environmental peacebuilding (frequently termed environmental peacemaking) examines and advocates environmental protection and cooperation as a factor in creating more peaceful relations. Peacebuilding is both the theory and practice of identifying the conditions that can lead to a sustainable peace between past, current or potential future adversaries. At the most basic level, warfare devastates ecosystems and the livelihoods of those who depend on natural resources, and the anarchy of conflict situations leads to the uncontrolled, destructive exploitation of natural resources. Preventing these impacts allows for an easier movement to a sustainable peace. From a more positive perspective, environmental cooperation can be one of the places where hostile parties can sustain a dialogue, and sustainable development is a prerequisite for a sustainable peace.

== Definitions ==
The study of peacebuilding (a term coined by Galtung, 1975) develops from interest in identifying the conditions that lead beyond a temporary cessation of violence to sustainable processes of conflict management and mutual cooperation between those who have previously been adversaries or might engage in destructive conflicts in the future. As envisioned by key thinkers such as Galtung or Lederach, peacebuilding refers to a comprehensive and long-term transformation of a conflict situation towards negative and eventually positive forms of peace. Beginning with Secretary General Boutros Boutros-Ghali promoting An Agenda for Peace in 1992, the United Nations adopted the language of post-conflict peacebuilding and developed programs based on it.

Recent studies have identified two dominant perspectives: the cooperation perspective is driven by the potential of environmental cooperation to contribute to peace through spillover effects. This perspective focuses primarily on the interstate level and often on conflict prevention rather than post-conflict peacebuilding. In contrast, the resource risk perspective recognizes resource-induced instability, especially after intrastate conflicts, and stresses the need to mitigate these risks to sustain the absence of violence (negative peace), through facilitating environmental cooperation.

The exact definition of environmental peacebuilding varies between different academic and policy documents, and the term is often used interchangeably with concepts like environmental peacemaking, disaster diplomacy or peace ecology. One literature review, published in 2018, suggests that environmental peacebuilding could be used to refer to "all forms of cooperation on environmental issues between distinct social groups, which aim at and/or achieve creating less violent and more peaceful relations between these groups." In this context, peace is explicitly understood to refer to negative forms of peace (absence of violence) as well as to positive forms of peace (social justice and the inconceivability of violent conflict). In a similar vein, Krampe and Swain suggest that "environmental peacebuilding can be defined as the sustainable management of natural resources to prevent conflict and build peace—before, during, or after conflict—emphasizing the potential for environmental cooperation to support peace and stability."

The Environmental Peacebuilding Association uses the following definition: "Environmental peacebuilding integrates natural resource management in conflict prevention, mitigation, resolution, and recovery to build resilience in communities affected by conflict." In 2021, several leading scholars and leaders of the Environmental Peacebuilding Association proposed the following definition: "environmental peacebuilding comprises the multiple approaches and pathways by which the management of environmental issues is integrated in and can support conflict prevention, mitigation, resolution and recovery." This definition has since been widely adopted.

== Mechanisms ==
Environmental peacebuilding can result from unilateral efforts or from cooperation between two adversarial parties. Actors such as international donors, governments or the civil society might work on their own or engage with other stakeholders to resolve environmental and resource management issues that give rise or have the potential to create conflict. These efforts can, intentionally or non-intentionally, result in more peaceful conditions by, for example, increasing trust, encouraging cooperation or creating new interstate institutions (see, as examples, the Nile Basin Initiative or the Mekong River Commission). If water infrastructure is provided in post-war cities, former combatants could receive support to build alternative livelihoods (e.g., land, sees and training for agriculture), or high-value resources (e.g., oil, gas) could be managed to mitigate grievances, environmental destruction and resource curse effects. Since the 1990s, the United Nations Environment Programme (UNEP) has placed environmental peacebuilding and conflict on its agenda, conducted environmental assessments of conflict zones, and has recommended a stronger integration of environmental issues into the work of the UN Peacebuilding Commission.

A 2021 article made effort to develop the theoretical thinking on why environmental peacebuilding would lead to peace. Building on Ken Conca's early work the study suggests three potential mechanisms "through which improved natural resource governance in post-conflict contexts is theorized to have positive effects on peace: (a) the contact hypothesis, whereby the facilitation of intergroup cooperation reduces bias and prejudice; (b) the diffusion of transnational norms, where the introduction of environmental and other good governance norms supports human empowerment and strengthens civil society; and (c) state service provision, where the provision of access to public services addresses the instrumental needs of communities, thereby strengthening their belief in the state."

In their award-winning article, McKenzie F Johnson, Luz A Rodríguez and Manuela Quijano Hoyos distinguish between five key mechanisms through which environmental peacebuilding can work: (1) improving economic development and the livelihoods of people (particularly in politically fragile areas), (2) establishing or strengthening resource management institutions that exert inclusive and transparent governance, (3) building trust and cooperation between (former, current or potential) conflict parties, (4) maintaining a sustainable environment (particularly for resource-dependent groups), and (5) enhancing knowledge, including on environmental conservation and conflict management.

== Limits of scholarship ==
While there is a substantial volume of case-based, qualitative research that explores the impacts of specific environmental peacebuilding projects or initiatives (see "Environmental peacebuilding in the Middle East" and "Environmental peacebuilding in other world regions" below), there are less large-N, statistical studies available on this topic which renders it more difficult to robustly determine that such environmental peacebuilding initiatives are the direct causes, rather than outcomes, of more peaceful interstate relations. The few large-N available studies indicate that transnational conservation and international water cooperation can contribute to peacebuilding.

== Environmental peacebuilding in the Middle East ==
The 1991 Madrid Conference, co-sponsored by the United States and the USSR, brought together representatives of the governments of Israel, Syria, Lebanon, and Jordan, and a Palestinian delegation within the Jordanian delegation. The conference established working groups on refugees, regional security, economic development, water, and environment. The working groups on water and environment, and to some extent the one on economic development as well, had the agenda of bringing environmental cooperation and sustainable development into the formulation of a path to a sustainable Middle East peace.

The subsequent Oslo Accords between Israel and the Palestinian Liberation Organization and the Peace treaty between Jordan and Israel each had sections that envisioned joint committees on water, environmental cooperation and economic development. When negotiations between Israel and the Palestinian Authority stalled and relations again became strongly adversarial, progress towards cooperation on water, the environment and sustainable development also stalled. At the formal level there are contacts across adversarial lines between government officials and experts, water infrastructure was kept out of the violence of the Second Intifadah, and there is some degree of cooperation – not widely publicized - on urgent water and environmental concerns. Cooperative relations between Jordan and Israel have been maintained but progress is limited by the effects of the unresolved Palestinian-Israeli conflict.

Diplomatic work on environmental peacebuilding in the region has been supplemented by the development of a small network of civil society organizations that promote and practice regional environmental cooperation. Hamas' massacre of Israeli on 7 October 2023 and the subsequent Israeli invasion of Gaza have seriously hampered the prospects of environmental peacebuilding in the region.

=== Organizations involved in environmental peacebuilding in the Middle East ===
==== Israel-Palestine Center for Research and Information ====
IPCRI opened in 1989 during the first Intifada under joint Israeli and Palestinian directors. IPCRI established the Water and Environment division in 1992. A 1993 edited book presented Palestinian and Israeli perspectives on water cooperation. Three IPCRI workshops held between 1994 and 1996 on "Our Shared Environment" were followed by three volumes of papers from the workshops. The IPCRI Water and Environment division took the lead in organizing a 2004 Israeli-Palestinian International "Water for Life" Conference, co-chaired by Israeli and Palestinian professors, held in Turkey, where over five days about 130 participants from the region were joined by about 50 international water experts.

Subsequently, working with Israeli and Palestinian experts, IPCRI undertook a study of the management of the trans-boundary Nahal Alexander / Wadi Zomer basin. IPCRI is a partner in the "GLOWA Jordan River" study of the impact of climate change on the Jordan basin, and has undertaken, with the support of the Government of Japan, work designed to provide a model for low cost sanitation to a West Bank village.

==== EcoPeace Middle East ====
EcoPeace Middle East was founded in 1994 as a meeting place for Palestinian, Egyptian, Jordanian and Israeli environmental NGOs and became an affiliate of Friends of the Earth in 1998. EcoPeace has a wide range of projects – organized around particular geographic areas (the Jordan River valley, the Dead Sea, the Gulf of Aqaba / Eilat), water (Good Water Neighbors, the Red Sea-Dead Sea Conduit, the mountain aquifer, "water, peace and the environment," water privatization), and environmental policy (sustainable development, climate change, "violent conflicts and the environment," trade and environment, solar power and healthy food). FoEME has promoted protection rather than development of the Dead Sea and its designation as a UNESCO World Heritage Site, advocated the establishment of a "peace park" along the Jordan River, and vigorously questioned the proposed mega-project to channel water from the Read Sea to the Dead Sea. The NGO circulates a monthly "environmental peacemaking" newsletter.

Since 2001 the EcoPeace Good Water Neighbors project has been working with Israeli, Palestinian and Jordanian communities that are mutually dependent on shared water resources. Each community is partnered with a neighboring community. Good Water Neighbors works with local community members on water awareness and development. GWN uses dependence on shared water sources as a basis for dialogue and cooperation between partnered communities. EcoPeace features a significant educational component, including working in school with students, teacher training and green business trainings.

EcoPeace has published its own study of environmental peacebuilding. Some external research on EcoPeace and the Good Water Neighbors have claimed that they provide small but positive contributions to peacebuilding and environmental protection in the Middle East, in contrast to more critical and skeptical assessments that highlight their limited on-the-ground impacts.

==== Migrating Birds Know No Boundaries ====
The initiative aims to preserve trans-boundary bird life in the region. In order to do so, it brings together Israelis, Jordanians and Palestinians, hence also facilitating trans-boundary exchange and cooperation, for instance to put up nesting boxes for barn owls. Other activities include the lobbying to decision makers, workshops with farmers and education projects in schools. Migrating Birds Know No Boundaries was founded by Tel Aviv University scientist Yossi Leshem and is supported by prominent decision makers such as former IDF general Baruch Spiegel and the retired Jordanian general Mansour Abu Rashid.

== Environmental peacebuilding in other regions ==
Environmental peacebuilding projects have also been conducted in other regions.

In Southern Africa, several trans-boundary peace parks have been established with the support of the Peace Parks Foundation since the 1990s, such as the Great Limpopo Transfrontier Park (Mozambique, South Africa, Zimbabwe), the Kgalagadi Transfrontier Park (Botswana, South Africa), the Maloti-Drakensberg Transfrontier Conservation and Development Area (Lesotho, South Africa) and the Lubombo Conservancy (Eswatini, Mozambique, South Africa). Assessments of these projects often highlight several negative aspects, such as the dominance of South Africa, the exclusion of local populations vis-a-vis state and business interests, and a low impact on peaceful international relations. Conservation cooperation between the DR Congo, Rwanda and Uganda in the Virunga region, by contrast, is reported to have yielded some conservation and peace benefits even though it took place in an environment characterized by political instability and low economic development. There are also bottom-up dynamics of environmental cooperation amidst conflict between pastoralists and farmers in several African countries, including Ghana and Kenya.

In Europe, environmental peacebuilding has taken place in, for example, Cyprus and the Kosovo, focusing on managing shared water resources across political boundaries. A trans-boundary peace park for the Balkan region has also been suggested. So far, these initiatives are believed to have encouraged civil society cooperation between (former) conflict parties, but it is unclear what their impacts are on formal peace processes.

Latin America has also seen some environmental peacebuilding projects take root, including the establishment of a conservation area and demilitarized zone in the Cordillera del Cóndor which supported Ecuador and Peru in resolving their long-standing conflict in 1998. Environmental cooperation in the context of the Central American Commission for Environment and Development (CCAD) and in the Trifinio region had reportedly contributed to the termination of hostilities between El Salvador and Honduras in the early 1990s as well. Since the end of the civil war in 2016, NGOs, governments, and local communities have launched several environmental peacebuilding projects in Colombia.

Asia has seen a great variety of environmental peacebuilding initiatives. Water cooperation along the Aral Sea served to improve interstate relations in the 1990s, even though it could not prevent environmental disasters in the region. Similarly, the Permanent Indus Commission and the Mekong River Commission have allowed for environment-related cooperation and exchange even during times of conflict, though the impact on wider international relations are believed to be more limited. UNEP's efforts to rehabilitate the Iraqi Marshlands are also reported to have indirectly contributed to peacebuilding by restoring livelihoods in the region, whereas in various African states, there are well-documented cases of bottom-up environmental peacebuilding (such as around water resources in Yemen) that have reportedly resulted in positive outcomes.

== Critiques ==
While environmental peacebuilding aims to address peace- and environment-related problems simultaneously and offers a more positive and less deterministic lens on environmental security, it has also been criticized both as a concept and a practice. Some researchers have argued that environmental peacebuilding suggests a win-win approach and romanticizes environmental cooperation, which risks giving rise to technical solutions that obscure wider political conflicts and socio-economic inequalities. For example, peace parks in southern Africa as well as large-scale hydropower cooperation can result in displacements of local populations and the occurrence of conflicts. Some scholars show how the technical approach to environmental peacebuilding in fact served as a securitising move, thereby legitimising environmental actors in conflict settings. Environmental peacebuilding can also serve as a pretext for coordinated resource exploitation, among other adverse consequences.

Some scholars also argue that the United Nations Environment Programme (UNEP)'s Environmental Cooperation for Peacebuilding Programme (2008–2015) overwhelmingly framed local actors as a risk in the context of natural resource management, hence discouraging their inclusion. Others experts retain a more positive view of UNEP's program.

== Professional associations and scholars ==
The Environmental Peacebuilding Association was established to further exchange, research and training on environmental peacebuilding. It conducts conferences and workshops on the issue and also sponsors several awards, including the Al-Moumin Award and Distinguished Lecture on Environmental Peacebuilding. It has also developed a MOOC on environmental peacebuilding. The Association produces a bi-weekly update (or newsletter) that contains information about publications, events, positions and developments relevant to environmental peacebuilding. The official peer-reviewed journal of the association, Environment and Security, launched in 2023.

"Land and Environment" is one of the ten themes of the United Nations Peacebuilding Portal. The University for Peace, sponsored by the United Nations, includes "Environmental Security and Peace" as one of its eight graduate programs. Governmental and civil society organizations have also explored the role of environmental issues in peacebuilding. The EU sponsored Initiative for Peacebuilding has produced a series of papers on environmental peacebuilding. The International Crisis Group includes Climate Change and Conflict as one of its key areas.

Key academics and researchers in the field of environmental peacebuilding include (in alphabetical order) Saleem Ali, Ken Conca, Geoffrey D. Dabelko, Tobias Ide, Florian Krampe, McKenzie F. Johnson and Erika Weinthal.

== See also ==
- Arava Institute for Environmental Studies
- Climate security
- Peacebuilding
- Environmental security
