= Pat Lauderdale =

American academic

Pat Lee Lauderdale (born Hobart, Oklahoma, U.S.A. October 19, 1944 – November 6, 2023) was an American professor in the School of Justice and Social Inquiry at Arizona State University. He received his doctorate in the sociology of law from Stanford University. In 2008, he was appointed a visiting scholar at the Center for Comparative Studies in Race and Ethnicity at Stanford University. His teaching and research interests include indigenous jurisprudence, racialization, diversity, global indigenous struggles, law and the social science, and international terrorism. In the 1980s he helped create the Herbert Blumer Institute in Costa Rica with the goal of discovering and describing alternatives to violence and criminal law. He also is known internationally for his research on the relationship between social deviance, law and diversity, and is a former editor of the International Studies Quarterly.

His book Law and Society (with James Inverarity and Barry Feld) has been translated into Japanese. His related research has been published in Spanish, German, and Italian (including the Calabrian dialect).

He is the former director of the university-wide Ph.D./J.D. program in justice studies, law, and the social sciences. Before coming to ASU in 1981, Lauderdale was an associate professor of sociology and law at the University of Minnesota. He had been a visiting scholar at the University of California, Santa Cruz. He has received Fulbright Research Fellowships to Costa Rica and Austria. He also has been a visiting scholar and professor at the University of Lecci, Italy, the University of Austria, and Stanford University. In 2007, he received an invitation to be a Fulbright Senior Specialist for a research project on "Indigenous peoples, minorities and globalization," Department of Sociology and UNISA Press, University of South Africa. He was a national president of Phi Theta Kappa Honorary Society and a Woodrow Wilson Scholar.

== Works ==
Cruit, Michael and Pat Lauderdale 2018. Climate Disruption: Neoliberalism Unmasked. Costa Rica: HBI.

Rodriguez, Pedro and Pat Lauderdale 2014 Hegemony and Collective Memories: Japanese-American Relocation and Imprisonment on American Indian ‘Land’, in Color Behind Bars: Racism in the U.S. Prison System. Praeger.

Oliverio, Annamarie and Pat Lauderdale, editors 2006. Terrorism: A New Testament. London: Sage UK and de Sitter

Inverarity, James and Pat Lauderdale Forthcoming, Law, Justice and Society (revised version of Law and Society). New York: General Hall.

Zegeye, Abebe, Richard Harris and Pat Lauderdale, editors 2005. Globalization and Post-Apartheid South Africa. Willowdale, Canada: de Sitter Publications.

Lauderdale, Pat, editor 2003. A Political Analysis of Deviance, New Edition. Toronto, Canada: de Sitter Publications.

Toggia, Pietro, Pat Lauderdale and Abebe Zegeye, editors 2000. Terror and Crisis in the Horn of Africa: Autopsy of Democracy, Human Rights, and Freedom. London: Ashgate.

Lauderdale, Pat and Randall Amster, Special Issue Editors 1997. Lives in the Balance: Perspectives on Global Injustice and Inequality. Leiden, the Netherlands: E. J. Brill.

Lauderdale, Pat and Michael Cruit 1993. The Struggle for Control: A Study of Law, Disputes and Deviance. New York: SUNY Press.

David Altheide, et al. 1990. School of Justice Studies, Lauderdale, Pat, co-editor New Directions in the Study of Justice, Law and Social Control. New York: Plenum.

Inverarity, James, Pat Lauderdale and Barry Feld 1983. Law and Society. Boston, Mass.: Little, Brown and Company.

1994–95. Japanese translated version (Law & Society by Setsuo Miyazawa), Rokko, Kobe, Japan.

Lauderdale, Pat, editor 1980. A Political Analysis of Deviance. Minneapolis: University of Minnesota Press.
