= International Affairs (journal) =

Academic journal

- Discipline: International relations
- Language: English
- Edited by: Andrew Dorman

Publication details
- Former name(s): Journal of the British Institute of International Affairs
- History: 1922–present
- Publisher: Oxford University Press on behalf of Chatham House (United Kingdom)
- Frequency: Bimonthly
- Open access: Gold and Green
- Impact factor: 5.957 (2021)

Standard abbreviations
- ISO 4: Int. Aff.

Indexing
- ISSN: 0020-5850 (print); 1468-2346 (web)
- JSTOR: inteaffaroyainst

Links
- Journal homepage; Journal page at publisher's website; Online access; Online archive

International Affairs is a peer-reviewed academic journal of international relations. Since its founding in 1922, the journal has been based at Chatham House, the Royal Institute of International Affairs. It has an impact factor of 3.9, according to the 2024 ISI Journal Citation Reports, and it was ranked No.8 out of 165 International Relations Journals. It aims to publish a combination of academically rigorous and policy-relevant research. It is published six times per year in print and online by Oxford University Press on behalf of Chatham House. In its 100-year history International Affairs has featured work by some of the leading figures in global politics and academia; from Mahatma Gandhi and Che Guevara to Joseph S. Nye and Susan Strange. The journal is currently co-edited by Rita Floyd and Asaf Siniver.

== History ==
=== 1922–1945 ===
In the wake of the First World War, the British (later Royal) Institute of International Affairs was established in 1920. It was based at Chatham House in London. Two years later the first issue of its journal was published. The founding editor, Geoffrey Malcolm Gathorne-Hardy, wrote in the first editorial that ‘the journal will, it is hoped… become a source of information and a guide to judgment in international affairs.’

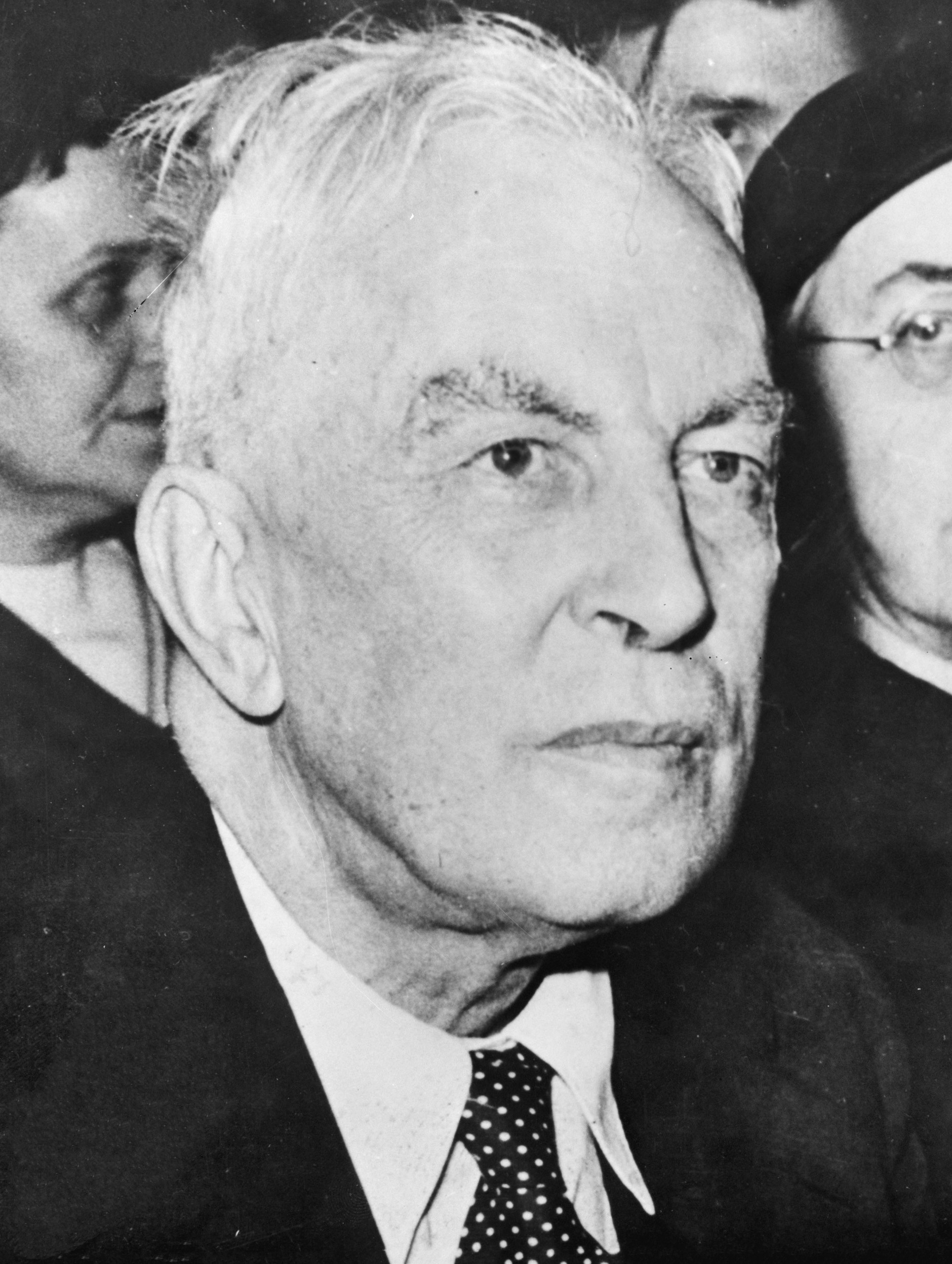
The historian Arnold J. Toynbee was a regular contributor in the early years of International Affairs.

For much of its early life the journal consisted of transcriptions of the major addresses and speeches given at Chatham House.

In 1931 the journal was renamed International Affairs. During that decade a number of highly regarded authors were featured including Mahatma Gandhi, who visited Chatham House in 1931 to give a speech titled ‘The Future of India.’ The historian Arnold J. Toynbee also appeared several times in the journal. The onset of the Second World War in 1939 saw the journal suspended ‘until further notice.’ Activity did not completely cease during the war, however, as a comprehensive book review supplement – often consisting of as many as 60 or more reviews – was published three times per year for four years. Taken together these supplements formed the 19th volume of International Affairs when publication resumed in 1944.

=== 1945–1970 ===
In the aftermath of the Second World War and through the 1950s International Affairs published many articles focused on the development of international institutions as well as analysis of Soviet foreign policy and the ongoing Cold War. The journal also maintained its global scope by covering the major events of the period for the African continent. As the wave of independence struggles gained momentum, articles for a special issue on Africa were commissioned and published in October 1960. Tanzanian president Julius Nyerere, as well as the heads of states of Tunisia and Mali were published in the journal around this period. Continuing to transcribe the major speeches given at Chatham House, in 1964 the journal published an article by Ernesto Che Guevara on the economic transformation of Cuba under Fidel Castro. Domestic political figures also published in International Affairs, including Vince Cable.

=== 1970–1991 ===
By the 1970s International Affairs had transitioned from acting solely as a record of Chatham House speeches to also publishing scholarly articles. Works by the likes of Hedley Bull, Joseph Nye and Susan Strange exemplified this new approach, including Strange's influential article ‘International economics and international relations: a case of mutual neglect.’ Indeed, Strange was a prolific regular contributor to the journal due to her links with Chatham House – publishing 81 articles and book reviews between 1950 and 1996 . During the 1980s this new reputation for academic research was combined with a focus on current affairs.

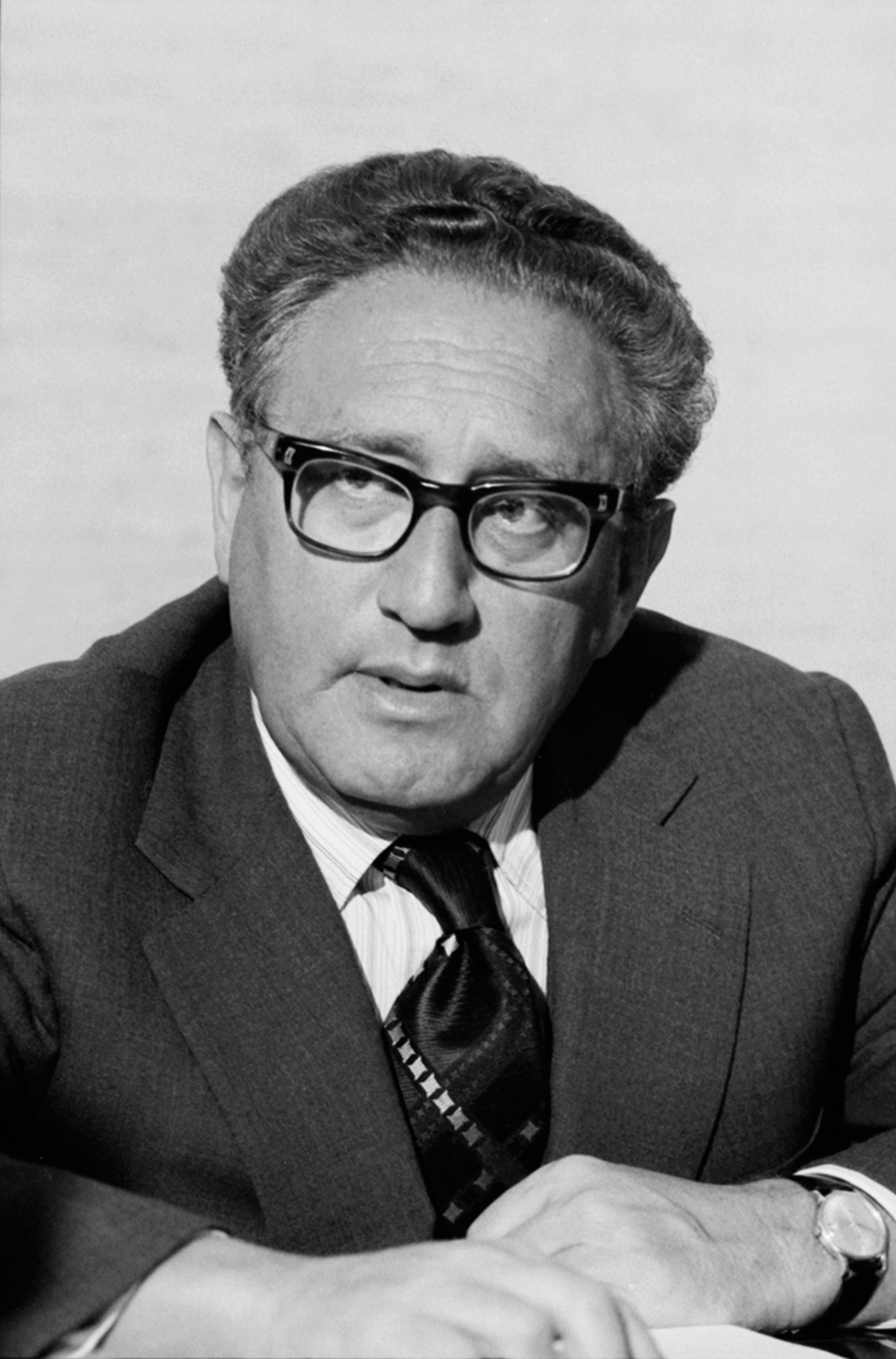
Former US Secretary of State Henry Kissinger contributed an article in 1982.

Articles on Afghanistan, Iran and the Falklands War appeared alongside more theoretical contributions to the field of International Relations. International security, nuclear weapons and the continuing instability in the Middle East were recurring themes. In 1982 the former US Secretary of State Henry Kissinger’s Chatham House speech appeared in the journal, titled ‘Reflections on a partnership: British and American attitudes to postwar foreign policy.’

=== 1991–present ===
The fall of the Soviet Union created a new geopolitical landscape, and in 1991 International Affairs published its first in a long line of articles seeking to understand the new reality: future Estonian president Lennart Meri’s ‘Estonia’s role in the new Europe’. In 1995, the 75th anniversary of Chatham House was commemorated with a special issue featuring reflections by Sir Michael Howard, Fred Halliday, Paul Krugman, Malcolm Bradbury and others. The 75th anniversary of the journal itself was celebrated in 1999.

The political implications of the 9/11 terror attacks on the United States resulted in a response from the journal, with a special issue April 2002 titled ‘New orders, new norms,’ which included an article by Joseph Nye. Through commissioning targeted special issues, International Affairs has covered a range of disciplines; including topics such as bio-diversity and environmental peacebuilding, global health crises such as HIV/AIDS and Ebola, and UK-EU relations.

The 85th volume of International Affairs was published in 2009. That year the first issue featured an article by longstanding editor Caroline Soper on the journal's history as well as one by former US National Security Advisor Zbigniew Brzezinski, which looked ahead to the major challenges for the newly inaugurated President Obama. 2014 saw the commemoration of the journal's 90th issue and also the 100th anniversary of the start of the First World War. Special issues marking both were published in January and March respectively.

2015 saw the transition to the current editorial team. Since this time the geographical coverage of the journal and its contributors has also broadened, with special issues published on China, India and Japan, featuring authors from those countries alongside western contributors. The journal has since developed social media and blog presences, and adopted an Open Access policy, following the 'Gold' model.

In 2020 half of all contributors to the journal, apart from book reviewers, identified as women.

== List of editors ==
Since 1922, 97 volumes of International Affairs have been published by 14 editors, totalling 451 issues. Below is a summary of the tenures of the respective editors.

Editor	Tenure
G.M. Gathorne-Hardy	1922-1931
Margaret Cleeve	1932-1957
Muriel Grindrod	1957-1963
N.P. Macdonald	1963-1971
Thomas Barman	1971 (January–April)
Wendy Hinde	1971-1979
Robert Jackson	1980
David Stephen	1981-1983
John Roper	1984-1989
Lucy Seton-Watson	1989-1992
J. E. Spence	1992-1996
Caroline Soper	1996-2014
Andrew Dorman	2015–2024
Rita Floyd & Asaf Siniver	2024-

== Book reviews ==
International Affairs has a comprehensive book reviews section. Each issue includes 30 or more reviews in a range of disciplines including the following:

- International Relations theory
- International history
- Governance, law and ethics
- Conflict, security and defence
- Political economy, economics and development
- Energy, environment and global health
- Europe
- Russia and Eurasia
- Middle East and North Africa
- Sub-Saharan Africa
- South Asia
- East Asia and Pacific
- North America
- Latin America and Caribbean

== Virtual issues ==
In recent years the International Affairs editors have curated a series of online-only ‘Virtual Issues’, in which a collection of articles from the archive demonstrate the journal's engagement with specific critical themes. All Virtual Issues are provided free to access by Oxford University Press, and are accompanied by introductions from noted specialists in the given disciplines. Current Virtual Issues include:

- India’s odyssey through international affairs
- UK defence policy
- The Falklands
- World development and world government in ‘International Affairs’
- The Middle East in ‘International Affairs’
- 70 years of the United Nations in ‘International Affairs’

== Editor's Choice ==
With every new issue, the Editor of International Affairs spotlights one paper recognized for its significant contribution to advancing research in the field. These selected articles are made available for free access, allowing readers to explore and download them without charge.

- Editor's Choice Articles

== Early Career Prize ==
In 2017 International Affairs launched their Early Career Prize, aimed at celebrating the work of journal contributors with less than seven years of academic experience. The Prize is awarded each year to an author (or authors if multi-authored article) whose International Affairs article is deemed by a committee comprising members of the journal's editorial board to fulfil the following criteria:

- An outstanding article that shows innovative thinking on an issue in international affairs/studies
- Offers a valuable contribution to the field/literature
- Demonstrates excellent research methods, analytical abilities and a clear presentation of argument
- Is well written in an accessible style
- Overall stands out as the best article by an early career author in the given calendar year, observing International Affairs remit to be an academically rigorous and policy-relevant journal.

The prize is awarded at the annual International Studies Association Convention. The previous winners are as follows:

Year	Name(s)	Article	Issue
2018	Jasmine-Kim Westendorf and Louise Searle	'Sexual exploitation and abuse in peace operations: trends, policy responses and future directions'	93:2 (March 2017)
2019	Katja Lindskov Jacobsen and Troels Gauslå Engell	'Conflict prevention as pragmatic response to a twofold crisis: liberal interventionism and Burundi'	94:2 (March 2018)
2020	Paula Drumond	'What about men? Towards a critical interrogation of sexual violence against men in global politics'	95:6 (November 2019)
2021	Olivier Schmitt	'Wartime paradigms and the future of western military power'	96:2 (March 2020)
2022	Jelena Cupać and Irem Ebetürk (joint winner)	'Backlash advocacy and NGO polarization over women's rights in the United Nations '	97:4 (July 2021)
2022	Clare Elder (joint winner)	'Somaliland's authoritarian turn: oligarchic–corporate power and the political economy of de facto states'	97:6 (November 2021)

== International Affairs Blog ==
In 2016 International Affairs launched a blog on the social publishing platform Medium. It was designed to bring insights from the journal to a wider audience, and raise the profile of the contributing academics. Since 2017 the blog has also featured a series of professional development posts, providing advice on publishing in academic journals.

== Abstracting and indexing ==
The journal is abstracted and indexed in:

- Academic ASAP
- Academic Search
- Arts & Humanities Citation Index
- British Humanities Index
- CSA Biological Sciences Database
- CSA Environmental Sciences & Pollution Management Database
- Current Contents/Social & Behavioral Sciences
- Ecology Abstracts
- Excerpta Indonesica
- GeoRef
- International Bibliographies of Periodical Literature
- International Bibliography of the Social Sciences
- InfoTrac
- International Political Science Abstracts
- Public Affairs Information Service
- ProQuest databases
- Scopus
- Social Sciences Citation Index
- Worldwide Political Sciences Abstracts
