= Climate security =

Environmental aspect of geopolitics

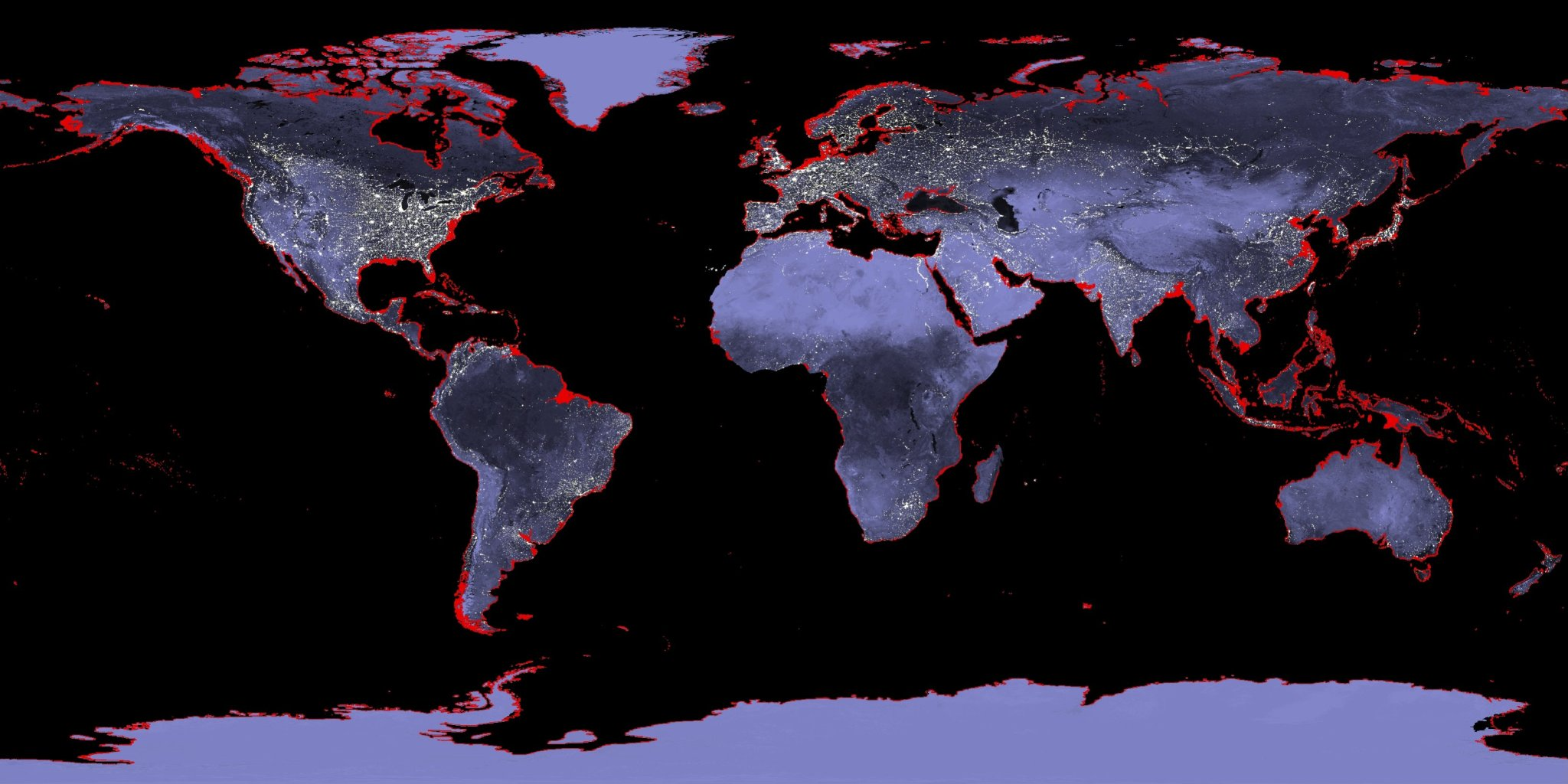
Map of the Earth with a six-meter sea level rise represented in red (uniform distribution, actual sea level rise will vary regionally). Hotspots of SLR can divert 3–4 times in the rate of rise, compared to the global average, such as projected for parts of the U.S. East Coast.

Climate security (also referred to as climate, peace and security) is a political and policy framework that looks at the impacts of climate on peace and security. Climate security often refers to the national and international security risks induced, directly or indirectly, by changes in climate patterns. It is a concept that summons the idea that climate-related change amplifies existing risks in society that endangers the security of humans, ecosystems, economy, infrastructure and societies. Climate-related security risks have far-reaching implications for the way the world manages peace and security. Climate actions to adapt and mitigate impacts can also have a negative effect on human security if mishandled.

The term climate security was initially promoted by national security analysts in the US and later Europe, but has since been adopted by a wide variety of actors including the United Nations, low and middle income states, civil society organizations and academia. The term is used in fields such as politics, diplomacy, environment and security with increasing frequency.

There are also critics of the term who argue that the term encourages a militarized response to the climate crisis, and ignores issues of maldistribution and inequity that underpin both the climate crisis and vulnerability to its impacts.

Those who look at national and international security risks argue that climate change has the potential to exacerbate existing tensions or create new ones – serving as a threat multiplier. For example, climate change is seen as a threat to military operations and national security, as the rise in sea level can affect military bases or extreme heat events can undermine the operability of armies. Climate change is also seen as a catalyst for violent conflict and a threat to international security, although the causality of climate and conflict is also debated. Due to the growing importance of climate security on the agendas of many governments, international organizations, and other bodies some now run programs which are designed to mitigate the effects of climate change on conflict. These practices are known as climate security practices. These practices stem from a variety of actors with different motivations in the sphere of development, diplomacy and defense; both NATO and the UN Security Council are involved in these practices.

== Definition ==
Climate security looks at the impacts of climate on security. Climate security often refers to the national and international security risks induced, directly or indirectly, by changes in climate patterns. It is a concept that summons the idea that climate-related change amplifies existing risks in society that endangers the security of humans, ecosystems, economy, infrastructure and societies.

== Background ==
Climate security refers to the security risks induced, directly or indirectly, by changes in climate patterns. Climate change has been identified as a severe-to-catastrophic threat to international security in the 21st century by multiple risk and security reports. The 2020 Global Catastrophic Risks report, issued by the Global Challenges Foundation, concluded that climate change has a high likelihood to end civilization. 70% of international governments consider climate change to be a national security issue. Policy interest in climate security risks has grown rapidly and affects the policy agenda in relation to food and energy security, migration policy, and diplomatic efforts.

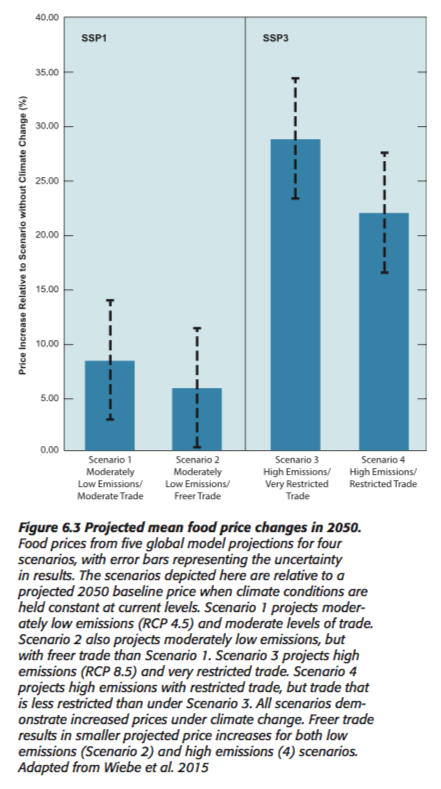
USDA, projected changes in food prices, depending on emissions scenarios, also factoring trade.

== Development ==
The term climate security was initially promoted by national security analysts in the US and later Europe, but has since been adopted by a wide variety of actors including the United Nations, low and middle income states, civil society organizations and academia.

The term is used in fields such as politics, diplomacy, environment and security with increasing frequency.

Within academia, climate security emerged from a discourse of environmental security and was first mentioned in the Brundtland Report in 1987. During the '70s and '80s the Jason advisory group, concerned with security, conducted research on climate change. Global climate change became an international issue with the broadening of the concept of security which emerged in the 1980s in the post-Cold War era. The broadening of the concept of security sought to look beyond the military domain, and include political, economic, societal, and environmental areas in the security agenda. The term security can refer to a broad range of securities including national, international, ecological and human security.

To map the different ways in which climate change is conceptualized, scholar Matt McDonald identifies four discourses of climate security advanced by policymakers, lobbyists, environmental advocates, civil society groups and academic analysts. He divides them into national, human, international and ecological types of security which respectively concern nation-states, 'people', the international community, and the 'ecosystem'. National climate security is the most dominant of the four discourses as it focuses on the threat climate change poses to nation-states and the maintenance of its sovereignty and 'territorial integrity' from an external threat. This discourse is advanced by national security institutions where the nation-state is viewed as the most capable provider of security through the military apparatus. This discourse has also been advanced by policy think tanks embracing the concept of 'threat multiplier'.

The international security discourse focuses on internationalism and global cooperation where international organizations are viewed as providers of security. Mitigation and adaptation strategies are central to this discourse, such as the transition to low carbon economies and the transfer of technology, sources, and expertise to developing countries. International organizations such as the UN Environment Program are involved in these processes and the more recent Sustainable Development Goals are an embodiment of such discourse. However, the UN Security Council plays a central role as the securitizing agent, which has been often criticized by developing countries, such as Group 77 and the non-Aligned Movement, as they are concerned climate change will be used to justify military intervention and increased military budgets by powerful countries. The human security discourse emerged as a counteracting alternative to national security, and was embraced first by the United Nations Development Program in 1994. It seeks to center the wellbeing of people rather than states. For the UN agencies, mitigation strategies and the redistribution of resources are seen as central to providing security to populations. The ecological security discourse is seldom included in dominant policy or academic debates.

While many International Relations (IR) scholars link climate change with security and conflict through a traditional military approach, there is an ongoing debate on whether climate change and environmental issues should be securitized and who and what is really protected. The scholars who theorized the concept of securitization allowed to deepen and broaden concepts of security beyond traditional military security through discourse methodology and 'speech acts.' For example, Copenhagen School scholars, such as Barry Buzan and Ole Wæver, argue that security justifies urgency and exceptionalism, focusing on defense, the military and the state and that climate change should instead be placed into 'normal politics' and removed from the security agenda. Furthermore, some scholars note how securitization theory, stemming as a response to traditional realism theory in the post-Cold War era, is mostly a Eurocentric field and does not include the legacies of colonialism and racial hierarchies inform global politics and governance.

The impacts of climate change, highlighted in 1990 by the First Assessment Report (FAR) of the Intergovernmental Panel on Climate Change (IPCC) and in 1992 by the United Nations Framework Convention on Climate Change (UNFCCC), highlighted the need for climate change to be viewed as a security threat and influenced international entities to do so. A report in 2003 by Peter Schwartz and Doug Randall looked at potential implications from climate-related scenarios for the national security of the United States, and concluded, "We have created a climate change scenario that although not the most likely, is plausible, and would challenge United States national security in ways that should be considered immediately."

In 2008, the EU published a report on climate change and international security, defining climate change as a 'threat multiplier' affecting EU own security and interests.

== Critiques and alternatives ==
The climate security approach has become prominent among political and policy spheres and has been called inevitable by some countries, inviting the UN Security Council to adopt more militarized approaches. However, some scholars and activists criticize climate security, arguing that framing climate change as a security issue can be problematic as it could increase solutions that rely on militaries which can worsen the injustices of those most affected by the climate crisis. This can also mean that security solutions end up benefiting the status quo, ignoring the well-being of the rest, such as refugees and other marginalized communities.

The climate security approach has also a significant impact on borders and migration, as its narrative emphasizes the 'threat' of climate-induced mass migration. Indeed, the border industrial complex is expected to grow globally by 7% annually. As the Transnational Institute report "Global Climate Wall" shows, the seven biggest GHG emitters the United States, Germany, Japan, the United Kingdom, Canada, France, and Australia spent collectively at least twice on border and immigration control than on climate finance between 2013 and 2018. The EU's budget for Frontex has increased by 2763% since its establishment in 2016 through 2021.

Social movements and organizations, such as Climate Justice alliance, We are Dissenters, Grassroots Global Justice Alliance, Indigenous Environmental Network, call for a bigger emphasis on climate justice and environmental justice rather than climate security. Climate justice puts the emphasis on the root causes of climate change, like colonialism and neocolonialism, global inequality, globalization and exploitative economic systems such as the exploitation of natural resources. Many call this addressing the era of climate colonialism. Indeed, many proponents of climate justice call for bigger support for Indigenous people and other frontline communities that are fighting for climate change and also already protecting 80% of Earth's biodiversity.

Many civil society actors also call for climate reparations on top of more climate finance, and also the establishment of Loss and Damage Finance Facility (LDFF), which has been proposed by low-income countries, as well as sovereign debt cancellation. This way, low-income countries could tackle the impacts of climate change for which they are bear the least responsibility.

From an academic standpoint, the concept of ecological security, allows for a more systemic approach to climate change that examines the structural roots of the climate crisis as the overlapping economic, political, and social issues of the global system.

== Effects of climate change ==
Climate change is a global challenge which will affect all countries in the long-term as the impact of climate change is spread unevenly across different regions. However, there may be a disproportionately harsher effect in fragile contexts and/or socially vulnerable and marginalized groups due to climate change vulnerability. For example, the Bay of Bengal, which includes Bangladesh, Myanmar, India, Indonesia, and Sri Lanka, is one of the world's most climate-vulnerable regions. Marginalized groups and minority communities, both in the Global North and Global South, are most affected by the effects of climate change, for which they are least responsible, which many call environmental injustice (see also climate justice).

Indeed, the richest 10% (circa 630 million people), of the world's population, mostly from EU and North America, are in fact responsible for 52% of carbon emissions, whereas the poorest 50% (circa 3.1 billion people) were responsible for only 7% of cumulative emissions. The Global North is responsible for 92 percent of GHG emissions and climate change is devastating the Global South. To account for this, the UNFCCC embodies the notion of "common but differentiated responsibilities (CBDR)" which addresses developed countries' responsibility to transfer aid and technology to developing countries.

Effects of climate change are well documented and growing for Earth's natural environment and human societies. Changes to the climate system include an overall warming trend, changes to precipitation patterns, and more extreme weather. As the climate changes it impacts the natural environment with effects such as more intense forest fires, thawing permafrost, and desertification. These changes impact ecosystems and societies, and can become irreversible once tipping points are crossed. Climate activists are engaged in a range of activities around the world that seek to ameliorate these issues or prevent them from happening.

Climate justice is a type of environmental justice that focuses on the unequal impacts of climate change on marginalized or otherwise vulnerable populations. Climate justice seeks to achieve an equitable distribution of both the burdens of climate change and the efforts to mitigate climate change through advocacy and policy change. The economic burden of climate change mitigation is estimated by some at around 1% to 2% of GDP. Climate justice examines concepts such as equality, human rights, collective rights, justice and the historical responsibilities for climate change.

=== Conflicts ===
Studies have shown that extreme weather events can damage economies, lower food production and raise inequality, which can increase risks of violence when combined with other factors. An article by leading experts found that climate change has influenced between 3% and 20% of armed conflict in the last century, that an increase of 2 °C above pre-industrial levels more than doubles the current risk of conflict, increasing it to 13%, and that an increase of 4 °C multiplies the risk by five, up to a 26% risk. Other researchers have specified the conditions under which climate change increases the risk of conflict and violence. These include a history of political instability, agricultural dependence, low levels of development, the political of ethnic groups from the political system, and insufficient conflict resolution institutions. At the micro level, temperature volatility associated with climate change has likewise been found to act as a risk multiplier for short-term spikes in interpersonal violent crime.

A report by the Global Peace Index found that 971 million people lived in areas with either a high or very high climate change exposure and that 400 million of those people lived in countries with low levels of peacefulness. It warned that climate change can increase the likelihood of violent conflict by impacting upon resource availability, job security, and by causing forced migration. Predicting future risks of climate change and conflict remains difficult, despite the existence of several predictive models and tools. Future climate change is likely to be very different from what humanity has experienced previously and the ability of societies to adapt is unclear.

Climate threats and risks

The secondary impacts of climate hazards could be even more dangerous. Chief among them is an increased risk of armed conflict in places where established social orders and populations are disrupted. The risk will rise even more where climate effects compound social instability, reduce access to basic necessities, undermine fragile governments and economies, damage vital infrastructure, and lower agricultural production.

— U.S. Army Climate Strategy
February 2022

A 2016 article suggested that conflict over climate-related water issues could lead to nuclear conflict between India and Pakistan. However, other scholars believe that climate change are unlikely to have major impacts on the nature of interstate wars, but have expressed concerns about its impacts on civil wars and communal conflicts. Based on a meta-analysis of 60 studies, Hsiang, Burke and Miguel concluded in 2013 that warmer temperatures and more extreme rainfall could increase interpersonal violence by 4%, and intergroup conflict by 14% (median estimates). However, their results have been disputed by other researchers as being not sufficiently robust to alternative model specifications.

Recent studies by authors like Buhaug, Detges, Ide and von Uexkull have been more careful. They agree that climate-related disasters (including heatwaves, droughts, storms and floods) modestly increase armed conflict risks, but only in the presence of contextual factors like agricultural dependence, insufficient infrastructure, the political exclusion of ethnic groups, insufficient conflict management, and high disaster vulnerability. Climate change is therefore rather a "risk multiplier" that amplifies existing risks of conflict. In line with this and other reviews of the topic, an expert assessment published 2019 in Nature concludes that between 3% and 20% of intrastate, armed conflict risks in the previous century were affected by climate-related factors, but that other drivers of conflict are far more important. The expert assessment itself notes that major knowledge gaps and uncertainties continue to exist in the research field, especially regarding the pathways connecting climate change to conflict risk.

Recently, researchers have paid increased attention to the impacts of climate change on low-intensity and even non-violent conflicts, such as riots or demonstrations. Even if people do not have the means or motivation to use violence, they can engage in such forms of conflict, for instance in the face of high food prices or water scarcity. Studies indeed show that in vulnerable societies, the anticipated consequences of climate change such as reduced food and water security increase the risk of protests. These conflicts often add to and trigger the escalation of deeper social and political struggles.

On a country by country basis, several case studies have linked climate change to increased violent conflicts between farmers and herders in Kenya and Sudan, but have found mixed results for Ghana, Mali, Nigeria and Tanzania. Evidence is also ambiguous and highly contested for high-intensity conflicts such as civil wars. Some experts suggest a contribution of climate change to civil wars in Mali, Nigeria, Somalia and Sudan. Other studies suggest that there is very little evidence for these causal claims, including for the cases of Darfur, Egypt, and Lake Chad.

The most prominent example of these debates is the Syrian civil war. Several studies claim that a climate-induced drought between 2006 and 2009 led to mass migration into urban areas, contributing to grievances and unrest that erupted in the 2011 protests. The repression of the latter marked the start of the civil war. A team around Jan Selby argues that these claims are overstated and that political decisions and mismanagement, rather than climate change and migration, have caused the onset of the war. Several recent studies find that the debate is not yet settled because there is evidence for both positions, yet a lack of comprehensive empirical data.

There are a number of studies that criticize how climate-conflict research is based on a deterministic and conflict-oriented worldview, that findings of statistical studies on the topic are based on problematic models and biased datasets, and that constructivist approaches are largely ignored. Existing research also predominantly focuses on a few, well-known and already conflict-ridden regions, such as Sub-Saharan Africa and the Middle East. This raises questions about sampling biases as well as implications for less-considered regions like Latin America and the Pacific, with topics such as peaceful adaptation and environmental peacebuilding also understudied. The IPCC's Sixth Assessment Report concluded in 2022: "Climate hazards have affected armed conflict within countries (medium confidence), but the influence of climate is small compared to socio-economic, political, and cultural factors (high confidence). Climate increases conflict risk by undermining food and water security, income and livelihoods, in situations where there are large populations, weather-sensitive economic activities, weak institutions and high levels of poverty and inequality (high confidence)."

Many politicians, decision makers, and journalists have drawn a connection between climate change and conflict. Already in a 2007 study on the topic, the German Advisory Council on Global Change identified four pathways potentially connecting climate change to conflict: degradation of freshwater resources, food insecurity, an increasing frequency and intensity of natural disasters, and increasing or changing migration patterns. A more recent 2021 report from the US Office of the Director of National Intelligence predicts intensifying physical effects of climate change "will exacerbate geopolitical flashpoints, particularly after 2030, and key countries and regions will face increasing risks of instability and need for humanitarian assistance." The United Nations Security Council has discussed the links between climate change and security various times, even though the position of its member states vary. Other key decision makers in the USA, the European Union, and NATO are also concerned about climate conflict risks.

In some cases, climate change could also decrease conflict risks. This happens either if climate-related disasters impose financial and logistical constraints on conflict parties or if various social groups come together to cooperate about the shared challenge of climate change (environmental peacebuilding).

== Adaptation ==
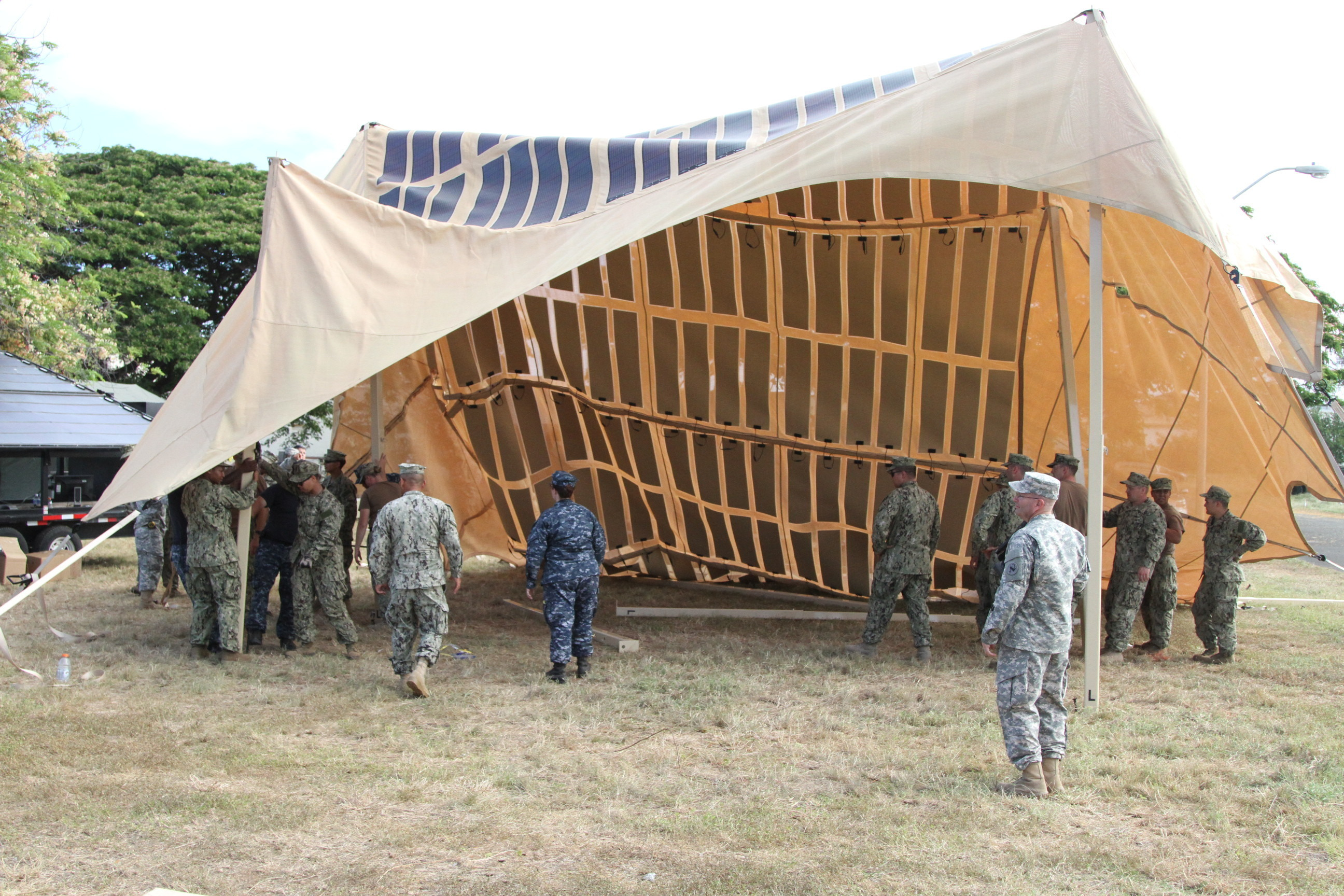
Setup of a solar shade canopy for humanitarian aid and disaster relief. The solar shade has the potential to provide enough energy for continuous 24-hour use.

=== Energy ===
At least since 2010, the U.S. military begun to push aggressively to develop, evaluate and deploy renewable energy to decrease its need to transport fossil fuels. Based on the 2015 annual report from NATO, the alliance plans investments in renewables and energy efficiency to reduce risks to soldiers, and cites the impacts from climate change on security as a reason.

=== Military operations and climate security ===
The main concern for military strategists - and central to many military and national security strategies - is the operability of armed forces during climate change. There are concerns over the impact of climate change on infrastructure, such as military bases, as well as on the capacity to fight, for example in extreme heat. A 2018 Pentagon report revealed that half of 3,500 military sites were suffering the effects of six key categories of extreme weather events, such as storm surge, wildfires and droughts.

There have consequently been efforts to 'green' the military and prepare it for a climate changed world, through the installation of solar panels at military bases, alternative fuels in shipping and renewable energy equipment.

There are also concerns about the reliance on fossil fuels, which can pose vulnerabilities for armed forces. The Pentagon alone is the world's largest consumer of fossil fuel. For example, during the US invasion of Iraq, one in nearly 40 fuel convoys in Iraq in 2007 resulted in a death or serious injury. At least since 2010, the U.S. military begun to push to develop, evaluate and deploy renewable energy to decrease its need to transport fossil fuels. The NATO's 2021 Climate Change and Security Action Plan proposes strategies to protect its assets along with a promise of GHG emissions reduction by 2050.

However, because military emissions reporting is only voluntary, there is a lack of transparent data on militaries' GHG emissions. A 2019 study by Brown University estimated 1.2 billion metric tons of GHG have been consumed by the U.S. military alone since the beginning of the war on terror in 2001. Additionally, Scientists for Global Responsibility have calculated UK military emissions to be 11 million tonnes, and EU emissions to be 24.8 million tonnes with France contributing to a third of the total.

The military's sustainability plans have been criticized as 'greenwashing.' Additionally, militarism and war have caused devastating environmental damages. The chemical contamination left in Afghanistan and the nuclear contamination in the Marshalls Islands are some examples of American imperialism and its environmental legacy.

=== Climate security practices ===
Due to the growing importance of climate security on the agendas of many governments, international organizations, and other bodies some now run programs which are designed to mitigate the effects of climate change on conflict. These practices are known as climate security practices which are defined by von Lossow et al. as "tangible actions implemented by a (local or central) government, organization, community, private actor or individual to help prevent, reduce, mitigate or adapt (to) security risks and threats related to impacts of climate change and related environmental degradation". The Planetary Security Initiative at the Clingendael Institute maintain an updated list of climate security practices.

These practices stem from a variety of actors with different motivations in the sphere of development, diplomacy and defence. An example is the Arms to Farms project in Kauswagan municipality, the Philippines. An insurgency in the area was aggravated by food insecurity because irregular rainfall that caused poor harvests led to an uptick in insurgent recruitment sparking further violence. The project successfully integrated former insurgents into the community by training them in agricultural methods and fostering trust between communities, increasing food security, peace and human security overall. Another example is a division of the UN peacekeeping mission in Mali (MINUSMA) that seeks to solve community conflicts, which can stem from climate change caused resource shortages. One project in Kidal built a new and more effective water pump in order to solve the issue of conflict between different stakeholders in the area over water which risked a violent confrontation.

A growing number of non-military and civil society organizations are advocating for a national security approach including Brookings Institution and the Council on Foreign Relations (US), the International Institute for Strategic Studies and Chatham House (UK), Stockholm International Peace Research Institute, Clingendael (Netherlands), French Institute for International and Strategic Affairs, Adelphi (Germany) and the Australian Strategic Policy Institute. Environmental groups have also embraced a national security approach such as the World Wildlife Fund, the Environmental Defense Fund and Nature Conservancy (US) and E3G in Europe. The grassroots group Extinction Rebellion Netherlands even invited a Dutch military general to contribute to their 'rebel' handbook. Even though these groups are often more concerned with human security they seek to involve the military as allies, driven by the belief that it can help achieve broader political and economic support.

The field of climate security practices is still young and even though the issue is growing in importance, some actors are still reluctant to get involved due to the uncertainty inherent in the new field. Because climatic change will only increase in the near future von Lossow et al. conclude that expanding the number of climate security practices in vulnerable areas of the world has "huge potential to catalyse more sustainable and long-term peace and stability".

== Political approaches ==
The transnational character of climate-related security risks often goes beyond the capacity of national governments to respond adequately. Many parts of governments or state leaders acknowledge climate change as an issue for human security, national or regional security.

Despite ongoing concerns about the securitization of climate change, it has had little effect on the policies and activities of national governments, which have tended to take 'business as usual' approaches to managing and containing international migration.

=== NATO ===
NATO stated in 2015 that climate change is a significant security threat and that "Its bite is already being felt". In 2021, NATO agreed a Climate Change and Security Action Plan that committed the alliance to 1) analyze the impact of climate change on NATO's strategic environment and NATO's assets, installations, missions and operations 2) incorporate climate change considerations into its work 3) contribute to the mitigation of climate change and 4) exchange with partner countries, as well as with international and regional organizations that are active on climate change and security.

The deployment of security forces can sometimes lead to insecurity, rather than security, for certain populations.For example, the 20-year US-led and NATO-supported military invasion and occupation of Afghanistan was launched in order to obtain security from terrorism and fight the war on terror, but it ended up fueling more war, conflict, and the return to power of the Taliban as a result of the withdrawal of United States troops from Afghanistan (2020–2021).

=== United Nations ===
Although climate change is first and foremost dealt within the United Nations Framework Convention on Climate Change (UNFCCC) and now also under the Paris agreement, the security implications of climate change do not have an institutional home within the United Nations system, and hence remain largely unaddressed, in spite of the urgency of the threat it poses to peace and security in several regions. The UN, through its COP - The Conference of the Parties - is the supreme body to negotiate climate frameworks under the UNFCCC Convention. It consists of the representatives of the Parties to the Convention and holds its sessions every year, and takes decisions which are necessary to ensure the effective implementation of the provisions of the Convention and regularly reviews the implementation of these provisions. Preventing "dangerous" human interference with the climate system is the ultimate aim of the UNFCCC. The UNFCCC is a "Rio Convention", one of three adopted at the "Rio Earth Summit" in 1992. The UNFCCC entered into force on March 21, 1994. Today, it has near-universal membership. The COP has discussed Climate Security during panels, workshops as session, but not as a programmatic track. The greater focus on this topic by the UN has led to the launch in October 2018 of the inter-agency DPPA-UNDP-UN Environment cooperation called the Climate Security Mechanism.

==== United Nations Security Council ====
The UN Security Council first debated climate security and energy in 2007 and in 2011 issued a presidential statement expressing concern at the possible adverse security effects of climate change. There has been a series of informal Arria-Formula meetings on issues related to climate change. In July 2018, Sweden initiated a debate on Climate and Security in the United Nations Security Council. In 2021 the UN Security Council convened for a high-level open debate on climate security. Climate change grew beyond its categorization as a hypothetical, existential risk and became an operational concern of relevance to other peace and security practitioners beyond the diplomats in the Security Council.

However, some countries, especially low and middle income countries (LMICs), do not think climate change should be seen as a security issue. When the topic of climate and security first emerged in the UN, LMICs opposed the securitization of climate change. In 2006 the Group of 77 (G77) argued that 'the United Nations Framework Convention on Climate Change (UNFCCC) is the primary international, intergovernmental forum for negotiating the global response to climate change' and that the richest countries should not only address the 'consequences [of climate change] but mainly the roots of the problem.' The G77 also stated that it is inappropriate to consider the issue of energy in the UNSC, 'reaffirming the key role of energy in achieving the goals of sustainable development, poverty eradication and achieving the MDGs [Millennium Development Goals]'. In 2013, the G77 and China argued that the UNSC was 'not the appropriate forum for this discussion' and that such issues should be assigned to the Economic and Social Council (ECOSOC) and the UN General Assembly. The G77 has not issued public positions since then.

== Country and continent examples ==
=== Africa ===
Climate change has had devastating effects on the African continent, affecting the poorest communities. It has escalated food insecurity, led to the displacement of populations and exerted extreme pressure on the available water resources. Africa's exposure to climate change is high due to the legacy of colonialism, inequitable global trade arrangements, its low adaptive capacity and limited government capabilities, making it the most vulnerable continent. A 2007 report by the UN Secretary-General, Ban Ki-Moon points out that, climate change and environmental degradation were partly responsible for the Darfur, Sudan conflict. Between 1967 and 2007, the total rainfall in the area had reduced by 30 percent and the expansion of the Sahara was beyond a mile every year. The ensuing friction between farmers and pastoralists over the reducing grazing land and the few water sources available was at the heart of the Darfur civil war. More recently US and European security analysts refer to the Sahel and the Lake Chad basin as a 'hotspot' because of its severe climate-related vulnerabilities, communal violence, jihadist insurgencies, political instability, and internal and regional displacement.

Climate change has caused rainfall variations and desertification threatening the well-being of people whose lives depend on Lake Chad. Reports suggest that Lake Chad is shrinking at a fast speed, which is creating sharp competition for water. In 2017, the UNSC adopted Resolution 2349 connecting conflict and water scarcity in the region. In 2020, Niger co-organized a UN Security Council meeting on climate security, following a 2018 UNSC statement on the Lake Chad Basin which identified climate change and the shrinking of Lake Chad as one of the root causes of the Boko Haram uprisings.

However scholars disagree on whether the desertification of Lake Chad has indeed led to conflicts, because there are other factors such as pre-existing socioeconomic and political conditions, the influx of arms into the region, unfair terms of trade, religious issues, and the marginalization of pastoralist communities.

=== Australia ===
A 2018 published report by the Australian Senate noted how "climate change as a current and existential national security risk... defined as one that threatens the premature extinction of Earth-originating intelligent life or the permanent and drastic destruction of its potential for desirable future development." Several reports by the Australian Security Leaders Climate Group have warned that climate change will pose a serious security threat to Australia, urging policy makers to strive for more ambitious mitigation and adaptation measures. Academic assessments have nuanced such claims, but generally agree that Australia is vulnerable to climate change in the human security and national security realm.

=== European Union ===
The European Council's conclusions on climate diplomacy state that "Climate change is a decisive global challenge which, if not urgently managed, will put at risk ... peace, stability and security." The Intelligence on European Pensions and Institutional Investment think-tank published a 2018 report with the key point, "Climate change is an existential risk whose elimination must become a corporate objective". In June 2018 European External Action Service (EEAS) High-Level Event hosted an event themed "Climate, Peace and Security: The Time for Action". The EU's comprehensive approach to security would suggest that the EU is well placed to respond to climate-related security risks. However, recent scientific research shows that the European Union has not yet developed a fully coherent policy.

=== Iceland ===
In late 2025, Iceland became one of the first nations to formally integrate the potential collapse of the Atlantic meridional overturning circulation (AMOC) into its national security framework. The Icelandic National Security Council designated the phenomenon as an existential threat, citing its potential to cause extreme weather, food insecurity, and economic disruption.

=== United Kingdom ===
The UK's former Foreign and Commonwealth Office (FCO) (now the Foreign, Commonwealth and Development Office, FCDO) was the first to push the UN to hold a meeting in the UN Security Council on climate change and urged the UNFCCC to take action in 2007. In 2011, the then UK Department for International Development (DFID) committed to spending 30% of its aid in fragile and conflict-affected states by 2014–15. Between 2013 and 2015, the FCO had discussions on the climate, security and conflict in 'fragile' states at G8 and G7 meetings.In 2014, David Cameron noted that "Climate change is one of the most serious threats facing our world". A 2018 article in UK's The Independent also argued that the U.S.' Trump administration is "putting British national security at risk", according to over 100 climate scientists. In the same year, the former UK Special Representative for Climate Change, Rear Admiral Neil Morisetti, claimed that 'Climate change will require more deployment of the British military in conflict prevention, conflict resolution or responding to increased humanitarian requirements due to extreme weather impacts.' The UK-established International Climate Fund (ICF) identifies climate change as a 'threat multiplier' within 'fragile' states. In 2015 a report by the Joint Committee on the National Security Strategy (NSS) confirmed that climate change presents a risk to national security and that spending on security would need to adapt.

On September 23, 2021, Lord Ahmad of Wimbledon, UK Minister for the United Nations stated that climate change threatened the safety of the country and all people. Recently the United Kingdom hosted the 26th UN Climate Change Conference of the Parties (COP26) in Glasgow on October 31–12 November 12, 2021. The UK's 'Integrated Review of Defence, Security, Development, and Foreign Policy', published in March 2021, argues that dealing with climate change and biodiversity loss was its 'number one international priority' and identified African countries as vulnerable countries to climate change, which can amplify insecurity, migration and instability on the continent.

=== United States ===
In the United States, analysis of climate security and the development of policy ideas for addressing it has been led by the Center for Climate and Security, founded by Francesco Femia and Caitlin Werrell in 2011, which is now an institute of the Council on Strategic Risks.

US intelligence analysts have expressed concern about the "serious security risks" of climate change since the 1980s. In 2007, the Council on Foreign Relations released a report titled, Climate Change and National Security: An Agenda for Action, stating that "Climate change presents a serious threat to the security and prosperity of the United States and other countries." A 2012 report published by the Joint Global Change Research Institute indicated that second and third order impacts of climate change, such as migration and state stability, are of concern for the US defense and intelligence communities. A 2015 report published by the White House found that climate change puts coastal areas at risk, that a changing Arctic poses risks to other parts of the country, risk for infrastructure, and increases demands on military resources. In 2016, Director of National Intelligence James Clapper noted: "Unpredictable instability has become the 'new normal,' and this trend will continue for the foreseeable future...Extreme weather, climate change, environmental degradation, rising demand for food and water, poor policy decisions and inadequate infrastructure will magnify this instability."

A 2015 Pentagon report pointed out how climate denial threatens national security. In 2017, the Trump administration removed climate change from its national security strategy. But in January 2019 the Pentagon released a report stating that climate change is a national security threat to USA. In June 2019, in the course of House Select Committee on Intelligence hearings on the national security implications of climate change, the White House blocked the submission of a statement by the State Department's Bureau of Intelligence and Research Office, and the analyst who wrote the statement resigned. The idea of creating a presidential committee on climate security has been proposed. As part of the United States National Defense Authorization Act the U.S. Congress asked the Department of Defense for a report on climate matters. The report was published in 2019, and notes, "The effects of a changing climate are a national security issue with potential impacts to Department of Defense (DoD or the Department) missions, operational plans, and installations." In 2021, United States President Biden declared climate change a national security priority.

== See also ==
- Climate resilience
- Energy security
- Environmental monitoring
- Food security
- Water conflict
- Water security
