= Geoffrey Dabelko =

American academic

Geoffrey D. Dabelko
- Education: University of Maryland; Duke University
- Known for: Environmental peacebuilding

Geoffrey D. Dabelko is a professor at the George V. Voinovich School of Leadership and Public Service at Ohio University in Athens, OH. He teaches and conducts research in the School's Environmental Studies Program and its Master's in Sustainability, Security, and Resilience. His recent research focuses on backdraft, the conflict and cooperation potential of responses to climate change, environmental peacebuilding, climate resilience and aging.

== Early life and education ==
Dabelko grew up in Athens, Ohio, graduating from Athens High School. He has an AB in political science from Duke University and a Ph.D. in government and politics from the University of Maryland.

== Career ==
From 1997-2012, Dabelko served as director of the Environmental Change and Security Program (ECSP) at the Woodrow Wilson International Center for Scholars in Washington, D.C. He continued to work with ECSP as a senior advisor to the Wilson Center until the Wilson Center was shut down in April 2025. He also served as an Associate Senior Fellow with the Stockholm International Peace Research Institute on its Environment of Peace Initiative. From 2012-2018, he served as director of Ohio University's Environmental Studies Program. From 2016-2022, he was am Associate Dean at the Voinovich School. He has held previous positions at the Carnegie Endowment for International Peace's Foreign Policy and the Council on Foreign Relations.

Dabelko is a former member of the United Nations Environment Programme's Expert Advisory Group on Environment, Conflict, and Peacebuilding. He was a board member (and former board chair) at Population Reference Bureau and a founding board member of the Environmental Peacebuilding Association. He is an editorial board member of the journal Environment and Security published by Sage and Case Studies in the Environment, published through University of California Press. Dabelko was a lead author on the 5th Assessment of the Intergovernmental Panel on Climate Change, Working Group II Chapter 12 on "Human Security." He was a chapter author on "Climate Effects on U.S. International Interests" of the 5th U.S. National Climate Assessment.

== Research ==
Together with Ken Conca, Dabelko developed the concept of environmental peacemaking in the early 2000s including editing a 2002 volume entitled Environmental Peacemaking. Not satisfied with existing approaches that conceived of the environment primarily as a source of conflict and violence, Dabelko and Conca outlined how cooperating on joint environmental issues can contribute to improved relations between nations. Drawing on several case studies, they analysed how international environmental cooperation can change the strategic climate between states (more trust, higher levels of interdependence) and even contribute to post-Westphalian governance (broader forms of transnational integration). This work was key for the development of environmental peacebuilding research and has been picked up by many studies in both international and domestic contexts. Dabelko continues to work in the field, for instance by co-editing a special issue on environmental peacebuilding and being an author of the Environment of Peace report. Dabelko and Conca were the co-recipients of the Fifth Al-Moumin Award and Distinguished Lecture on Environmental Peacebuilding in 2018 for their work on environmental peacebuilding. Erik Solheim, then Executive Director of the United Nations Environment Programme said "No two individuals have shaped our institutional thinking on environmental peacebuilding more than Geoff Dabelko and Ken Conca."

Dabelko is also co-editor, with Ken Conca of American University, of Green Planet Blues: Critical Perspectives on Global Environmental Politics and Environmental Peacemaking. Furthermore, he has coined the concept of "backdraft" to raise attention to the adverse and potentially conflict-enhancing effects of climate change mitigation and adaptation.

== Personal life ==
Dabelko lives in Athens, OH.

== Publications ==
- Conca, Ken; Dabelko, Geoffrey D. (2002). Environmental peacemaking. Washington, D.C.: Woodrow Wilson Center Press. ISBN 0-8018-7192-1. OCLC 50520518.
- Conca, Ken; Dabelko, Geoffrey D., eds. (2019). Green planet blues: critical perspectives on global environmental politics (6th ed.). New York: Routledge. ISBN 978-0-429-32220-4. OCLC 1099544139.
- Dabelko, Geoffrey D. et al. (2023). Navigating a just and peaceful transition. Part 3. Environment of Peace Initiative. Stockholm: Stockholm International Peace Research Institute. https://doi.org/10.55163/BHYR7656
- Dabelko-Schoeny, Holly; Dabelko, Geoffrey D., Rao, Smitha; Damico, Melissa; Doherty, Fiona C.; Travor, Anthony C.; Sheldon, Marissa. (2024). "Age-friendly and climate resilience communities: A grey green alliance." The Gerontologist Vol 64 No 3. March. https://academic.oup.com/gerontologist/advance-article/doi/10.1093/geront/gnad137/7293249
