= Environmental security =

Field of study on environmental threats

Environmental security examines threats posed by environmental events and trends to individuals, communities or nations. It may focus on the impact of human conflict and international relations on the environment, or on how environmental problems cross state borders.

== General ==
The Millennium Project assessed definitions of environmental security and created a synthesis definition:

Environmental security is environmental viability for life support, with three sub-elements:

- preventing or repairing military damage to the environment,
- preventing or responding to environmentally caused conflicts, and
- protecting the environment due to its inherent moral value.

It considers the abilities of individuals, communities or nations to cope with environmental risks, changes or conflicts, or limited natural resources. For example, climate change can be viewed as a threat to environmental security (see the article climate security for more nuance to the discussion.) Human activity impacts CO_{2} emissions, impacting regional and global climatic and environmental changes and thus changes in agricultural output. This can lead to food shortages which will then cause political debate, ethnic tension, and civil unrest.

Environmental security is an important concept in three fields: international relations and international development and human security.

Within international development, projects may aim to improve aspects of environmental security such as food security or water security, but also connected aspects such as energy security, that are now recognised as Sustainable Development Goals at UN level. Targets for MDG 7 about environmental sustainability show international priorities for environmental security. Target 7B is about the security of fisheries on which many people depend for food. Fisheries are an example of a resource that cannot be contained within state borders. A conflict before the International Court of Justice between Chile and Peru about maritime borders and their associated fisheries is a case study for environmental security.

== History ==
The Copenhagen School defines the referent object of environmental security as the environment, or some strategic part of it.

Historically, the definition of international security has varied over time. After World War II, definitions typically focused on the subject of realpolitik that developed during the Cold War between the United States and the Soviet Union.

As tensions between the superpowers eased after the collapse of the Soviet Union, academic discussions of definitions of security significantly expanded, particularly including environmental threats associated with the political implications of resource use or pollution. By the mid-1980s, this field of study was becoming known as "environmental security". Despite a wide range of semantic and academic debates over terms, it is now widely acknowledged that environmental factors play both direct and indirect roles in both political disputes and violent conflicts.

In the academic sphere, environmental security is defined as the relationship between security concerns such as armed conflict and the natural environment. A small but rapidly developing field, it has become particularly relevant for those studying resource scarcity and conflict in the developing world. Prominent early researchers in the field include Felix Dodds, Norman Myers, Jessica Tuchman Mathews, Michael Renner, Richard Ullman, Arthur Westing, Michael Klare, Thomas Homer Dixon, Geoffrey Dabelko, Peter Gleick, Rita Floyd and Joseph Romm.

=== Origins ===
According to Jon Barnett, environmental security emerged as an important concept in security studies because of some interrelated developments which started in 1960s. The first one was the increasing level of environmental consciousness in so called developed countries. Various occurrences and events triggered the growth of the environmental movement during this period of time. Rachel Carson's well-known book Silent Spring was one of the extraordinary publications of that time and brought greater degree of environmental awareness among ordinary people by warning them of the dangers to all natural systems including animals and food chain from the misuse of chemical pesticides such as DDT. Whilst Carson undoubtedly contributed to public debate at the time she was arguably not amongst the more radical 'social revolutionaries' who were also urging greater public awareness of environmental issues. Moreover, a number of the largest well-known environmental non-governmental organizations such as the World Wildlife Fund (1961), Friends of the Earth (1969), and Greenpeace (1971) were founded during that time. Climate security is an extension of environmental security.

The second notable development which brings the emergence of concept of environmental security was number of scholars started to criticize the traditional notion of security and mainstream security debates in their work from 1970s by emphasizing its inability to handle environmental problems at national and international security level. First commentators were Richard Falk who published 'This Endangered Planet' (1971), and Harold and Margaret Sprout who wrote 'Toward a Politics of Planet Earth' (1971). These two commentators asserted in their book that the notion of security can no longer be centered only on military power, rather nations should collectively take measurements against common environmental problems since they pose threat to national well-being and thus international stability. These main ideas about environmental interdependence between countries and common security threat have remained key themes of environmental security studies. However, not until Richard Ullman publishes an academic article named "Redefining Security" (1983), radical departure from the dominant security discourse haven't happened. Ullman offered the following definition of national security threat as "an action or sequence of events that (1) threatens drastically and over a relatively brief span of time to degrade the quality of life for the inhabitants of a state, or (2) threatens significantly to narrow the range of policy choices available to the government of a state, or to private, nongovernmental entities within the state". Significant other scientists onward also linked the issue of security by focusing on the role of environmental degradation in causing violent conflict. Others, while recognizing the importance of environmental problems, argued that labeling them 'environmental security' was problematic and abandoned analytical rigor for normative and emotional power.

== Environmental change and security ==
Even though environmental degradation and climate change sometimes cause violent conflict within and between countries and other times not, it can weaken the national security of the state in number of profound ways. Environmental change can undermine the economic prosperity which plays big role in country's military capacity and material power. In some developed countries, and in most developing countries, natural resources and environmental services tend to be important factors for economic growth and employment rate. Income from and employment in primary sectors such as agriculture, forestry, fishing, and mining, and from environmentally dependent services like tourism, may all be adversely affected by environmental change. If natural capital base of an economy erodes, then so does the long-term capacity of its armed forces. Moreover, changes in environmental condition can exposes people to health threats, it can also undermine human capital and its well-being which are essential factors of economic development and stability of human society.

Climate change also could, through extreme weather events, have a more direct impact on national security by damaging critical infrastructures such as military bases, naval yards and training grounds, thereby severely threatening essential national defense resources.

== Selected early literature ==
- Brown, L. 1977. "Redefining Security," WorldWatch Paper 14 (Washington, D.C.: WorldWatch Institute)
- Ullman, R.H. 1983. "Redefining Security," International Security 8, No. 1 (Summer 1983): 129–153.
- Westing, A.H. 1986. "An Expanded Concept of International Security," In Global Resources and International Conflict, ed. Arthur H. Westing. Oxford: Oxford University Press.
- Myers, N. 1986. "The Environmental Dimension to Security Issues." The Environmentalist 6 (1986): pp. 251–257.
- Ehrlich, P.R., and A.H. Ehrlich. 1988. The Environmental Dimensions of National Security. Stanford, CA: Stanford Institute for Population and Resource Studies.
- Svensson, U. 1988. "Environmental Security: A Concept." Presented at the International Conference on Environmental Stress and Security, the Royal Swedish Academy of Sciences, Stockholm, Sweden, December 1988.
- Mathews, J.T. 1989. "Redefining Security," Foreign Affairs 68, No. 2 (Spring 1989): 162–177.
- Gleick, P H. "The Implications of Global Climate Changes for International Security." Climate Change 15 (October 1989): pp. 303–325.
- Gleick, P.H. 1990c. "Environment, resources, and international security and politics." In E. Arnett (ed.) Science and International Security: Responding to a Changing World. American Association for the Advancement of Science Press, Washington, D.C. pp. 501–523.
- Gleick, P.H. 1991b. "Environment and security: The clear connections." Bulletin of the Atomic Scientists. Vol. 47, No. 3, pp. 16–21.
- Homer-Dixon, T.F. 1991. "On the Threshold: Environmental Changes as Causes of Acute Conflict, International Security 16, No. 2 (Fall 1991): 76-116
- Romm, Joseph (1992). The Once and Future Superpower: How to Restore America's Economic, Energy, and Environmental Security. New York: William Morrow & Co. ISBN 978-0-688-11868-6. ISBN 0-688-11868-2
- Romm, Joseph J. 1993. Defining National Security: The Nonmilitary Aspects (New York: Council on Foreign Relations)
- Levy, M.A. 1995. "Is the Environment a National Security Issue?" International Security 20, No. 2 (Fall 1995)
- Swain, A (1996). "Displacing the Conflict: Environmental Destruction in Bangladesh and Ethnic Conflict in India". Journal of Peace Research. 33 (2): 189–204. doi:10.1177/0022343396033002005. S2CID 111184119.
- Wallensteen, P., & Swain, A. 1997. "Environment, Conflict and Cooperation." In D. Brune, D. Chapman, M. Gwynne, & J. Pacyna, The Global Environment. Science, Technology and Management (Vol. 2, pp. 691–704). Weinheim: VCH Verlagsgemeinschaft mbH.
- Terminski, Bogumil. 2009. "Environmentally-Induced Displacement. Theoretical Frameworks and Current Challenges", CEDEM, Université de Liège.
- Dabelko, G.D. 1996. "Ideas and the Evolution of Environmental Security Conceptions." Paper presented at the International Studies Association Annual Meeting, San Diego, CA, April 1996.
- Kobtzeff, Oleg. 2000. "Environmental Security and Civil Society", in- Gardner, Hall, (ed.) Central and South-central Europe in Transition, Westport, Connecticut: Praeger, 2000, pp. 219–296.
- Dodds, F. Pippard, T. 2005. (edited) "Human and Environmental Security: An Agenda for Change, London. Earthscan.
- Dodds, F. Higham, A. Sherman, R. 2009. (edited) "Climate Change and Energy Insecurity: The Challenge for Peace, Security and Development", London. Earthscan
- Djoghlaf, A. Dodds, F. 2010 (edited) "Biodiversity and Ecosystem Insecurity: A Planet in Peril", London, Earthscan
- Dodds, F. Bartram, J. 2016 (edited) "The Water, Food, Energy and Climate Nexus: Challenges and an agenda for action", London, Routledge

== See also ==
- Impact event
