= Stacy D. VanDeveer =

American academic

- Born: Stacy Dale VanDeveer; 1967 (age 58–59); Chillicothe, Illinois, United States

Academic background
- Education: University of Illinois at Urbana-Champaign (BA); University of Maryland (MA) (PhD)

Academic work
- Main interests: International relations, environmentalism, US foreign policy, Eurasian foreign affairs, human rights
- Notable works: Comparative Environmental Politics: Theory, Practice, and Prospects (American and Comparative Environmental Policy)
- Website: www.umb.edu/faculty_staff/bio/stacy_d._vandeveer

Stacy D. VanDeveer (born 1967) is an American academic and international relations scholar. He is Professor, Department of Conflict Resolution, Human Security, and Global Governance at the McCormack Graduate School at the University of Massachusetts, Boston. He was Chair of the Department of Political Science and Professor of Political Science at the University of New Hampshire. He has also taught courses with Harvard Extension School and Harvard Summer School, and been a fellow at Harvard University's John F. Kennedy School of Government, Brown University's Transatlantic Academy, UMASS, and UNH London Program. VanDeveer has authored and co-authored over 90 articles, book chapters, reports and six co-edited books on his specialties. His research interests include international relations, comparative politics, LGBT rights, EU and transatlantic politics, humanitarian degradation and connections between environmental and security issues.

== Early life ==
VanDeveer was born in 1967 in Chillicothe, Illinois and attended Il Valley Central High School. He earned a BA in Political Science/International Relations and Western Literature from the University of Illinois at Urbana-Champaign (1985–1990), a MA from the University of Maryland (1994) and a PhD in Political Science/International Relations from the same university (1990–1997). Later at Harvard, he became a post-doctoral research fellow in the Belfer Center for Science and International Affair's at the John F. Kennedy School of Government.

He is married (since 2012) and currently resides in Boston, Massachusetts.

== Career ==
VanDeveer taught as an associate professor at the University of New Hampshire (2004 -2013) and as a professor and department chair at the same institution (2013–present) and has taught courses with Harvard Extension School and Harvard Summer School. He has also been a fellow at Harvard University's John F. Kennedy School of Government, Brown University's Transatlantic Academy, UMASS, and UNH London Program.

He has received research funding from the European Union, US National Science Foundation, the US Embassy of Canada, the Swedish Foundation for Strategic Environmental Research (MISTRA), among other entities. He has also briefed at the White House, Woodrow Wilson Center's Environmental Change and Security Program, among others.

== Books ==
- VanDeveer, Stacy D.; Axelrod, Regina S.; Downie, David Leonard (2016) The Global Environment: Institutions, Law, and Policy (Choice Outstanding Academic Books) CQ Press, ISBN 978-0872899667
- VanDeveer, Stacy D.; Selin, Henrik (2015) European Union and Environmental Governance (Global Institutions) Routledge, ASIN B00WZIDFDO
- VanDeveer, Stacy D.; Bulkeley, Harriet; Andonova, Liliana; Betsill, Michele M.; Compagnon, Daiel; Hale, Thomas; Hoffmann, Matthew J.; Newell, Peter; Paterson, Matthew; Roger, Charles (2014) Transnational Climate Change Governance, Cambridge University Press, ISBN 110706869X
- VanDeveer, Stac D.; Bleischwitz, Raimund; Boersma, Tim; Johnson, Corey (2014) Want, Waste or War?: The Global Reousrce Nexus and the Struggle for Land, Energy, Food, Water and Minerals Routledge, ISBN 978-1138784598
- VanDeveer, Stacy D. (2013) Still Digging: Extractive Industries, Resource Curses, and Transnational Governance in the Anthropocene, German Marshall Fund, ASIN B00B1H2HUC
- VanDeveer, Stacy D.; Kemp, Geoffrey; Johnson, Corey; Andrews-Speed, Philip; Boersma, Tim; Bleischwitz, Raimund (2012) The Global Resource Nexus: The Struggles for Land, Energy, Food, Water and Minerals, Transatlantic Academy, ASIN B0083H7O4M
- VanDeveer, Stacy D.; Steinberg, Paul F. (2012) Comparative Environmental Politics: Theory, Practice, and Prospects (American and Comparative Environmental Policy) The MIT Press, ASIN B0078XFX9A
- VanDeveer, Stacy D.; Schreurs, Miranda A.; Selin, Henrick (2009), Transatlantic environment and Energy Politics (Global Governance), Ashgate, ISBN 978- 0754675976
- VanDeveer, Stacy D.; Selin, Henrik (2009) Changing Climates in North American Politics: Institutions, Policymaking, and Multilevel Governance, The MIT Press, ISBN 978-0262512862
- VanDeveer, Stacy D.; Carmin, Joann (2004) EU Enlargement and the Environment: Institutional Changes and Environmental Policy in Central and Eastern Europe, Frank Cass & Co ISBN 978-0714685892
- VanDeveer, Stacy D.; Brooks, L. Anathea (1997), Saving the Seas: Values, Scientists and International Governance, Cornell Maritim Pr/Tidewater Pub, ISBN 978-0943676623
