= Peace ecology =

The term peace ecology has been used by Christos Kyrou of American University to describe a proposed theoretical framework that is intended to provide "a better understanding, of the inherent capacities of the environment to inform and sustain peace."

== Use of the term ==
Peace ecology was introduced by Professor Christos Kyrou, of American University first in an article at the annual meeting of the International Studies Association, in San Diego, California, Mar 22, 2006. It was later published in its completed form in an article with the title Peace Ecology: An Emerging Paradigm In Peace Studies in The International Journal of Peace Studies, Volume 12 #1, 2007.

With a follow-up article submitted for the Conference on Cutting Edge Theories and Recent Developments in Conflict Resolution, September 27 and 28, 2007, at Syracuse, NY, Dr. Kyrou examined various methodological perspectives from Peace Ecology.

Dr. Kyrou, together with his graduate and undergraduate students at the International Peace & Conflict Resolution Division of the School of International Service at The American University in Washington DC continues their efforts to expand the practical and theoretical potential of Peace Ecology.
