= Global Environmental Politics =

Academic journal

- Discipline: Environmental politics
- Language: English
- Edited by: Susan Park, Henrik Selin, D.G. Webster

Publication details
- History: 2000-present
- Publisher: MIT Press (United States)
- Frequency: Quarterly
- Impact factor: 4.8 (2022)

Standard abbreviations
- ISO 4: Glob. Environ. Politics

Indexing
- ISSN: 1526-3800 (print); 1536-0091 (web)
- LCCN: sn99009158
- OCLC no.: 47266514

Links
- Journal homepage; Online access

Global Environmental Politics (GEP) is a quarterly peer-reviewed academic journal which examines the relationship between global political forces and environmental change. It covers such topics as the role of states, international finance, science and technology, and grass roots movements. The journal is associated with the environmental section of the International Studies Association. Issues of Global Environmental Politics are divided into three types of articles: short commentaries for a section called Current Debates/Forum, full-length research articles, and book review articles.

According to the Journal Citation Reports, the journal has a 2022 impact factor of 4.8, ranking it 7th out of 160 journals in the category "International Relations".

== Scope ==
Articles published in Global Environmental Politics include issues concerning certain countries and small groups within those countries, but they must address environmental disputes that are relevant on a global scale. Due to the primary focus of political and policy issues discussed in GEP articles, the range of reader and author backgrounds is presumed and expected.

The range of submissions focuses on how local-global interactions affect the natural environment, as well as how environmental change affects world politics. The articles published address issues like poverty and inequality, norms and institutions, and economic relationships. The scope of articles also includes specific environmental issues, for example, ozone depletion, climate change, and deforestation.

GEP also offers an "Early Access" submission option. The Early Access option applies to articles that have been accepted for publication and copyedited, but are not yet finished. These articles are displayed online for durations spanning from weeks to months. They are only to be replaced once the final version is completed and its issue is published. The Early Access option allows the peer review process to begin, increasing the opportunities for feedback and displaying what an uncorrected proof looks like before it is ready for publication. This helps establish the standards for what GEP accepts as an uncorrected proof and expects once it is finalized, while also creating transparency in the editing process that benefits peer reviewers.

== Editorial History ==
The journal was established in 2000 and is published by MIT Press online . The founding editor was Peter Dauvergne. Jennifer Clapp and Matthew Paterson were the co-editors 2007 through 2012, and Kate O'Neill and Stacy VanDever led the journal 2013–2017. The editors for 2018-2022 were Steven Bernstein, Matthew Hoffmann, and Erika Weinthal. Currently, Susan Park, Henrik Selin and D.G. Webster edit the journal.

== Current Debates/Forum ==
Originally called "Current Debates", the emphasis for this section of the article was shifted when the new editorial team consisting of Jennifer Clapp and Matthew Paterson took over the editorial board. The shorter articles in the Forum section are included in the journal as a means to encourage debate as well as future research. They include new theoretical or historical insights, emerging environmental issues, and discussion of controversial developments in environmental policy.

Some issues of Global Environmental Politics feature numerous articles discussing a single topic while others contain only one article with the goal of inciting debate on a range of connected issues. These forum articles comprise short commentaries (2000-3000 words) that prompt discussion on salient issues of interest to other readers and scholars in the field.

== Research Articles ==
The journal hosts full-length research articles that provide an academic setting for original theoretical or empirical contributions relating to global environmental or comparative politics on a global scale. Research Articles are full-length papers of a maximum of 8000 words, including footnotes and bibliography, that must contain original first-party research. Each journal edition typically consists of four to six articles.

== Book reviews ==
Each addition of Global Environmental Politics contains an array of book reviews pertaining to global political forces and environmental changes. The current book review editor is Elizabeth DeSombre. The book review process consists of the editor choosing a number of books per journal edition to which a reviewer may submit a single book review or a review essay. Review essays contain a collective analysis of multiple books on one topic which have been previously outlined by the review editor.

== Abstracting and indexing ==
GEP is indexed in sources including:

- Academic Search
- BIOBASE
- CNKI, China
- Current Awareness in Biological Sciences
- Current Contents
- EBSCO Discovery
- EconLit
- Environment Index
- Environmental Sciences and Pollution Management
- GEOBASE
- International Political Science Abstracts
- Political Science Complete
- Pollution Abstracts
- ProQuest Summon
- Public Affairs Index
- Scopus
- Social Sciences Citation Index

== See also ==
- List of political science journals
- MIT Press
- Jstor
