= Democracy Video Challenge =

The Democracy Video Challenge is an annual film contest featuring films under three minutes in length that complete the phrase "Democracy is…" It is part of a broader initiative called "Democracy is…" that seeks to use creative mediums to start a global discussion about the meaning of democracy. The contests use social media to foster that dialogue among people around the world.

The 2009 Video Challenge was first announced on September 15, 2008, International Day of Democracy. Richard Engel, NBC News chief foreign correspondent served as master of ceremonies for both the 2009 and 2010 contest launches. Since its launch, more than 1,600 people from 111 countries have entered the contest, while nearly 3.5 million people have been engaged online.

== Process ==
Each year the Challenge honors one winner from each of six regions: Sub-Saharan Africa, East Asia and the Pacific, Europe, the Near East and North Africa, South and Central Asia, and the Western Hemisphere.

A jury selects 18 finalists – three videos from each of the six geographic regions. The winners are then selected during a global online vote on YouTube. The six winning filmmakers receive an all-expense-paid trip to Washington, D.C., Hollywood and New York City to meet with professionals from entertainment, government, media and civil society.

== Jury ==
Years jurors participated are in parentheses. Jury co-chairs are noted with an asterisk.

- Michael Apted, President, Directors Guild of America (2009)*
- Hernando de Soto, President, Institute for Liberty and Democracy (2009, 2010)*
- Mitch Bainwol, Chairman & CEO, Recording Industry Association of America (2010)
- Michael Blieden, Member, Directors Guild of America (2009)
- Charles Burnett, Member, Directors Guild of America (2009)
- Mary Schmidt Campbell, Dean, New York University Tisch School of the Arts (2009, 2010)
- Kendra Carter, Director Diversity Talent Initiatives and Executive Lead on the Comedy Short Cuts Film Festival, NBC Universal (2010)
- Jay Chandrasekhar, Member, Directors Guild of America (2009)
- Tsering Choden, 2009 Democracy Video Challenge winner from South and Central Asia (2010)
- Jennifer Corriero, Executive Director and Co-Founder, TakingITGlobal (2009, 2010)
- Lorne W. Craner, President, International Republican Institute (2009, 2010)
- Richard Engel, Chief Foreign Affairs Correspondent, NBC News (2009, 2010)
- Lesli Linka Glatter, Member, Directors Guild of America (2009)
- Dan Glickman, President, Motion Picture Association of America (2009, 2010)
- Rodin Hamidi, 2009 Democracy Video Challenge winner from Near East (2010)
- Anna Israel, 2009 Democracy Video Challenge winner from Western Hemisphere (2010)
- Victoria Hochberg, Member, Directors Guild of America (2009)
- Norman Hollyn, Associate Professor, University of Southern California School of Cinematic Arts (2009)
- Jeremy Kagan, Professor, University of Southern California School of Cinematic Arts (2009)
- Rob Lieberman, Member, Directors Guild of America (2009)
- Aissa Peñafiel, 2009 Democracy Video Challenge winner from East Asia and Pacific (2010)
- Gina Prince-Bythewood, Member, Directors Guild of America (2009)
- William Reese, Chief Executive Officer, International Youth Foundation (2009, 2010)
- Luke Russert, Special Correspondent, NBC News (2009)
- Penelope Spheeris, Member, Directors Guild of America (2009)
- John Sullivan, Executive Director, Center for International Private Enterprise (2009, 2010)
- Lukasz Szozda, 2009 Democracy Video Challenge winner from Europe (2010)
- Chansa Tembo, 2009 Democracy Video Challenge winner from Africa (2010)
- Ernest J. Wilson III, Dean of Annenberg, University of Southern California Annenberg School for Communication & Journalism (2010)
- Ken Wollack, President, National Democratic Institute (2009, 2010)

== 2009 Winners ==
Name	Film	Country/Region
Tsering Choden	Democracy is…A Movement of the People	Nepal / South and Central Asia
Rodin Hamidi	The Path	United Arab Emirates / Near East and North Africa
Anna Israel	In a Democracy, We are all Parts of the Same Body	Brazil / Western Hemisphere
Aissa Peñafiel	Long Live the Fearless Man	Philippines / East Asia and Pacific
Lukasz Szozda	Democracy is…Animation	Poland / Europe
Chansa Tembo	Democracy is like a smoothie	Zambia / Sub-Saharan Africa

== 2010 Winners ==
Name	Film	Country/Region
Adhyatmika	Democracy is yet to learn.	Indonesia / East Asia and the Pacific
Farbod Khoshtinat	ATTN: Mr. Democrat	Iran / Near East and North Africa
Joel Marsden	World Vote Now	Spain / Europe
Juan Pablo Patiño Arévalo	"Democracy is... the right of life" (War Child).	Colombia / Western Hemisphere
Anup Poudel	Democracy is Black	Nepal / South and Central Asia
Yared Shumete	Democracy is fair play	Ethiopia / Sub-Saharan Africa

== Spinoffs ==
In January 2010 a Democracy is… Twitter contest was conducted. The contest received 1,400 entries with the winner determined by the entry with the greatest number of re-tweets. The winner received a Flip HD video camera.

On July 1, 2010 the first Democracy Photo Challenge was announced. Like the other challenges, participants will be asked to submit photos that complete the phrase "Democracy is…" The contest entry period is slated to run July 7–28, 2010. The winners announced on the United Nations’ International Day of Democracy, September 15, 2010. The winning photographs exhibited at the UN headquarters in New York.

Democracy Photo Challenge jury co-chairs include:

- Phil Borges, documentary photographer and founder of the nonprofit Bridges to Understanding
- Willis Hartshorn, Ehrenkranz director of the International Center of Photography
- Louie Psihoyos, Academy Award-winning documentary director (“The Cove”), photographer and executive director of the Oceanic Preservation Society

== Partners ==
- Center for International Private Enterprise
- International Republican Institute
- International Youth Foundation
- Motion Picture Association of America
- National Democratic Institute
- NBC Universal
- New York University Tisch School of the Arts
- Recording Industry Association of America
- TakingITGlobal
- University of Southern California Annenberg School for Communication & Journalism
- U.S. Department of State
- YouTube

Additional partners in the Democracy Photo Challenge include:

- The Annenberg Space for Photography
- Bridges to Understanding
- Getty Images
- International Center of Photography
- One Economy Corporation
- Picasa Web Albums
