= Democracy Photo Challenge =

The Democracy Photo Challenge is a contest that invites people to complete the phrase "Democracy is..." through digital photos submitted online. Google’s Picasa Web Albums created the online platform for the contest, a first for the photo sharing website. In 2010, nearly 3,000 people from 131 countries entered the contest online.

The Photo Challenge is a spinoff of the Democracy Video Challenge, an annual contest in which contestants complete the phrase “Democracy is…” through short online videos.

== Process ==
Submissions for the 2010 contest were accepted online from July 7 to July 28, 2010. An independent jury narrowed the submissions to 36 finalists representing each region of the world. The online public then voted for their favorites. In total, more than half a million people took part in the voting.

The 12 winners were announced on September 15, 2010 during International Day of Democracy. The winning photographs were displayed at the United Nations.

== Jury ==
The 2010 jury was co-chaired by documentary photographer Phil Borges, International Center of Photography director Willis Hartshorn and Academy Award-winning director Louie Psihoyos.

== Winners ==
Name	Country/Region
Kaveh Baghdadchi	Iran / Near East
Ian M. Cunningham	United States / Western Hemisphere
Wladia Drummond	Brazil / Western Hemisphere
Kaylene George	South Africa / Africa
Venkatesh Hamyanaik	Australia / East Asia and Pacific
Samir Atabey	Azerbaijan / Europe
Jun Krishna Joshi	Nepal / South and Central Asia
Mohamed Kaouche	Algeria / Near East
Mustafa Kia	Afghanistan / South and Central Asia
Mikas Matsuzawa	Philippines / East Asia and Pacific
Mike Mitchell	Benin / Africa
Dino Peri	Bosnia and Herzegovina / Europe

== Partners ==
- The Annenberg Space for Photography
- Bridges to Understanding
- Center for International Private Enterprise
- Getty Images
- International Center of Photography
- International Republican Institute
- International Youth Foundation
- Motion Picture Association of America
- National Democratic Institute
- NBC Universal
- New York University-Tisch School of the Arts
- One Economy
- Recording Industry Association of America
- TakingITGlobal
- University of Southern California
- U.S. Department of State
- YouTube
