= Peacebuilding =

Nonviolent intervention to prevent conflict

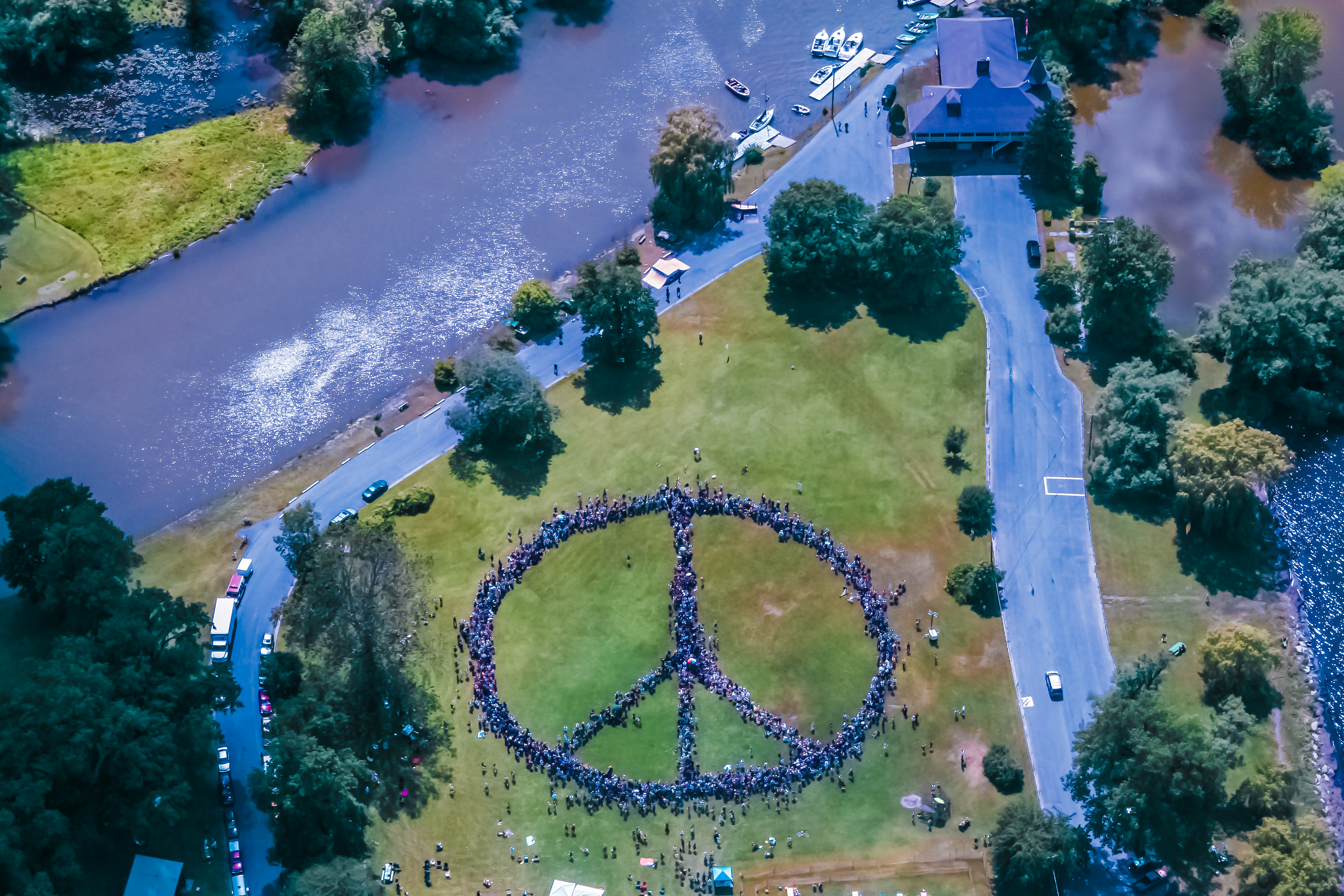
Human peace sign - symbolically represents a holistic approach to peacebuilding.

Peacebuilding is an activity that aims to resolve injustice in nonviolent ways and to transform the cultural and structural conditions that generate deadly or destructive conflict. It revolves around developing constructive personal, group, and political relationships across ethnic, religious, class, national, and racial boundaries. The process includes violence prevention; conflict management, resolution, or transformation; and post-conflict reconciliation or trauma healing before, during, and after any given case of violence.

As such, peacebuilding is a multidisciplinary cross-sector technique or method that becomes strategic when it works over the long run and at all levels of society to establish and sustain relationships among people locally and globally and thus engenders sustainable peace. Strategic peacebuilding activities address the root or potential causes of violence, create a societal expectation for peaceful conflict resolution, and stabilize society politically and socioeconomically.

The methods included in peacebuilding vary depending on the situation and the agent of peacebuilding. Successful peacebuilding activities create an environment supportive of self-sustaining, durable peace; reconcile opponents; prevent conflict from restarting; integrate civil society; create rule of law mechanisms; and address underlying structural and societal issues. Researchers and practitioners also increasingly find that peacebuilding is most effective and durable when it relies upon local conceptions of peace and the underlying dynamics that foster or enable conflict.

== Definition ==
The definition of peacebuilding varies depending on the actor, with some definitions specifying what activities fall within the scope of peacebuilding or restricting peacebuilding to post-conflict interventions. Even if peacebuilding has remained a largely amorphous concept without clear guidelines or goals, common to all definitions is the agreement that improving human security is the central task of peacebuilding. In this sense, peacebuilding includes a wide range of efforts by diverse actors in government and civil society at the community, national, and international levels to address the root causes of violence and ensure civilians have freedom from fear (negative peace), freedom from want (positive peace) and freedom from humiliation before, during, and after violent conflict.

Although many of peacebuilding's aims overlap with those of peacemaking, peacekeeping and conflict resolution, it is a distinct idea. Peacemaking involves stopping an ongoing conflict, whereas peacebuilding happens before a conflict starts or once it ends. Peacekeeping prevents the resumption of fighting following a conflict; it does not address the underlying causes of violence or work to create societal change, as peacebuilding does. Peacekeeping also differs from peacebuilding in that it only occurs after conflict ends, not before it begins. Conflict resolution does not include some components of peacebuilding, such as state building and socioeconomic development.

While some use the term to refer to only post-conflict or post-war contexts, most use the term more broadly to refer to any stage of conflict. Before conflict becomes violent, preventive peacebuilding efforts, such as diplomatic, economic development, social, educational, health, legal and security sector reform programs, address potential sources of instability and violence. This is also termed conflict prevention. Peacebuilding efforts aim to manage, mitigate, resolve and transform central aspects of the conflict through official diplomacy; as well as through civil society peace processes and informal dialogue, negotiation, and mediation. Peacebuilding addresses economic, social and political root causes of violence and fosters reconciliation to prevent the return of structural and direct violence. Peacebuilding efforts aim to change beliefs, attitudes and behaviors to transform the short and long term dynamics between individuals and groups toward a more stable, peaceful coexistence. Peacebuilding is an approach to an entire set of interrelated efforts that support peace.

Peace-building is a term of more recent origin that, as used in the report of the Panel on United Nations Peace Operations (2000), defines "activities undertaken on the far side of conflict to reassemble the foundations of peace and provide the tools for building on those foundations something that is more than just the absence of war. "

In 2007, the UN Secretary-General's Policy Committee defined peacebuilding as follows: "Peacebuilding involves a range of measures targeted to reduce the risk of lapsing or relapsing into conflict by strengthening national capacities at all levels for conflict management, and to lay the foundations for sustainable peace and sustainable development. Peacebuilding strategies must be coherent and tailored to specific needs of the country concerned, based on national ownership, and should comprise a carefully prioritized, sequenced, and therefore relatively narrow set of activities aimed at achieving the above objectives."

Peacebuilding can apply knowledge and theories from peace and conflict studies.

== History ==
As World War II ended in the mid-1940s, international initiatives such as the creation of the Bretton Woods institutions and The Marshall Plan consisted of long-term postconflict intervention programs in Europe with which the United States and its allies aimed to rebuild the continent following the destruction of World War II. The focus of these initiatives revolved around a narrative of peacekeeping and peacemaking.

Norwegian sociologist Johan Galtung coined the term "peacebuilding" in 1975, arguing that "peace has a structure different from, perhaps over and above, peacekeeping and ad hoc peacemaking... The mechanisms that peace is based on should be built into the structure and be present as a reservoir for the system itself to draw up. ... More specifically, structures must be found that remove causes of wars and offer alternatives to war in situations where wars might occur." Galtung's work emphasized a bottom-up approach that decentralized social and economic structures, amounting to a call for a societal shift from structures of coercion and violence to a culture of peace.

Then, as the Cold War and the various phenomena of its fizzling came to a close (e.g. civil wars between Third World countries, Reagonomics, "Bringing the State Back In"), American sociologist John Paul Lederach further refined the concept of peacebuilding through several 1990s publications that focus on engaging grassroots, local, NGO, international and other actors to create a sustainable peace process, especially with respect to cases of intractable deadly conflict where he was actively mediating between warring parties. From a political-institutional perspective, he does not advocate the same degree of structural change as Galtung. However, Lederach's influence in the conceptual evolution of peacebuilding still reflects Galtung's original vision for "positive peace" by detailing, categorizing, & expanding upon the sociocultural processes through which we address both direct and structural elements of violent conflict.

Peacebuilding has since expanded to include many different dimensions, such as disarmament, demobilization and reintegration and rebuilding governmental, economic and civil society institutions. The concept was popularized in the international community through UN Secretary-General Boutros Boutros-Ghali's 1992 report An Agenda for Peace. The report defined post-conflict peacebuilding as an "action to identify and support structures which will tend to strengthen and solidify peace in order to avoid a relapse into conflict". At the 2005 World Summit, the United Nations began creating a peacebuilding architecture based on Kofi Annan's proposals. The proposal called for three organizations: the UN Peacebuilding Commission, which was founded in 2005; the UN Peacebuilding Fund, founded in 2006; and the UN Peacebuilding Support Office, which was created in 2005. These three organizations enable the Secretary-General to coordinate the UN's peacebuilding efforts. National governments' interest in the topic has also increased due to fears that failed states serve as breeding grounds for conflict and extremism and thus threaten international security. Some states have begun to view peacebuilding as a way to demonstrate their relevance. However, peacebuilding activities continue to account for small percentages of states' budgets.

== Approaches to peace ==
In a very broad sense, there are three primary approaches to peacebuilding, which each correspond to three primary types of peace: (1) negative peace vs. (2) positive peace (Galtung) vs. (3) justpeace (Lederach, sometimes spelled "just peace"). In turn, these three types of peace correspond respectively to three primary types of violence: (1) direct violence vs. (2) structural violence vs. (3) cultural violence.

=== Negative peace: direct violence ===
Negative peace refers to the absence of direct, or "hot" violence, which refers to acts that impose immediate harm on a given subject or group. In this sense, negative peacebuilding (aimed at negative peace) intentionally focuses on addressing the direct factors driving harmful conflict. When applying the term "peacebuilding" to this work, there is an explicit attempt by those designing and planning a peacebuilding effort to reduce direct violence.

=== Positive peace: structural violence ===
Positive peace refers to the absence of both direct violence as well as structural violence. Structural violence refers to the ways that systems & institutions in society cause, reinforce, or perpetuate direct violence. In this sense, positive peacebuilding (aimed at positive peace) intentionally focuses on address the indirect factors driving or mitigating harmful conflict, with an emphasis on engaging institutions, policies, and political-economic conditions as they relate to exploitation and repression.

=== Justpeace: cultural violence ===
Justpeace (or "just peace") refers to the absence of all three types of violence enumerated above: direct, structural, & cultural. Cultural violence refers to aspects of culture that can be used to justify or legitimize direct or structural violence—the ways in which direct or structural violence look or feel "right" according to the moral fabric of society. In this sense, just peacebuilding (aimed at justpeace) intentionally combines the methods of "positive peacebuilding" (as described above) with a special focus on building and transforming sustainable relationships among conflicting sectors & cultures in such a way that promotes more alignment between each culture's mores (standards of "right" behavior or conditions) and the extent to which those mores are built/equipped to prevent, resolve, and heal patterns of direct and structural violence.

When Lederach first proposed the term in the late 1990s, he wrote:

Inspired by colleagues from the Justapaz Centre in Bogota, Colombia, I propose that by the year 2050 the word justpeace be accepted in everyday common language and appear as an entry in the Webster's Dictionary. It will read:

Justpeace \ jest pés \ n, vi, (justpeace-building) 1: an adaptive process-structure of human relationships characterized by high justice and low violence 2: an infrastructure of organization or governance that responds to human conflict through nonviolent means as first and last resorts 3: a view of systems as responsive to the permanency and interdependence of relationships and change.

== Institutionalization ==
Following periods of protracted violence, peacebuilding often takes shape in the form of constitutional agreements, laying out a path for co-operation and tolerance between former warring factions. A common method that has been applied in a variety of states is consociationalism. Initially set forth by political scientist Arend Lijphart, consociationalism calls for a power-sharing form of democracy. Identified by four aspects: grand coalition, mutual veto, proportionality and segmental autonomy; it aims to generate peace across societies that have been torn apart by their internal divisions. Ultimately, consociationalism aims to create a stable society that is able to outlast and overcome differences that may remerge. Examples of consociational agreements can be seen in Northern Ireland, Bosnia and Herzegovina and Lebanon.

In an effort to de-emphasise the importance of ethnicity, critics of consociationalism such as Brian Barry, Donald L. Horowitz, and to a certain extent, Roland Paris, have developed their own brands of constitutional peacebuilding that rely on the existence of a moderate society.

Centripetalism as advocated by Horowitz, encourages political parties of divided societies to adopt a moderate campaign platform. Through the alternative vote and a distributive requirement, centripetalism aims to create a society that votes across ethnic or religious lines, allowing civic issues to take precedence.

== Components ==
The activities included in peacebuilding vary depending on the situation and the agent of peacebuilding. Successful peacebuilding activities create an environment supportive of self-sustaining, durable peace; reconcile opponents; prevent conflict from restarting; integrate civil society; create rule of law mechanisms; and address underlying structural and societal issues. To accomplish these goals, peacebuilding must address functional structures, emotional conditions and social psychology, social stability, rule of law and ethics, and cultural sensitivities.

Preconflict peacebuilding interventions aim to prevent the start of violent conflict. These strategies involve a variety of actors and sectors in order to transform the conflict. Even though the definition of peacebuilding includes preconflict interventions, in practice most peacebuilding interventions are postconflict. However, many peacebuilding scholars advocate an increased focus on preconflict peacebuilding in the future.

There are many different approaches to categorization of forms of peacebuilding among the peacebuilding field's many scholars.

Barnett et al. divide postconflict peacebuilding into three dimensions: stabilizing the post-conflict zone, restoring state institutions, and dealing with social and economic issues. Activities within the first dimension reinforce state stability post-conflict and discourage former combatants from returning to war (disarmament, demobilization and reintegration, or DDR). Second dimension activities build state capacity to provide basic public goods and increase state legitimacy. Programs in the third dimension build a post-conflict society's ability to manage conflicts peacefully and promote socioeconomic development.

1st Dimension	2nd Dimension	3rd Dimension
Taking away weapons; Re-integrating former combatants into civilian society	Rebuilding basic facilities, transportation and communication networks, utilities; Developing rule of law systems and public administration; Building educational and health infrastructure; Providing technical and capacity-building assistance for institutions; Creating legitimate (democratic, accountable) state institutions	Trauma counseling; Transitional justice and restoration; Community dialogue; Building bridges between different communities; Increasing human rights; Gender empowerment; Raising environmental awareness; Promoting economic development; Developing a civil society and private sector that can represent diverse interests and challenge the state peacefully

A mixture of locally and internationally focused components is key to building a long-term sustainable peace. Mac Ginty says that while different "indigenous" communities utilize different conflict resolution techniques, most of them share the common characteristics described in the table below. Since indigenous peacebuilding practices arise from local communities, they are tailored to local context and culture in a way that generalized international peacebuilding approaches are not.

Local, customary and traditional	International
Respected local figures; Public dimension; Storytelling and airing of grievances; Emphasis on relationships; Reliance on local resources	Top-down: engages with national elites, not locals; Exclusive: deals are made behind closed doors; Technocratic/ahistorical basis: emphasis on 'striking a deal', 'moving on'; Modeled on corporate culture: reaching a deal, meeting deadlines prioritzed over relations; Relies on external personnel, ideas and material resources

== Theory ==
The Ripeness theory by I. William Zartman introduces the concept of a "ripe moment" for the commencement of peace negotiations in a conflict, a necessary (but not sufficient) condition that must be fulfilled before actors in a conflict will be willing to faithfully engage in peace negotiations. The ripe moment requires: (1) a stalemate, where none of the actors can achieve victory and conflict continuation is mutually hurting; (2) a way out, where actors can provide the necessary security that enables peace negotiation to occur.

Without these features, Zartman argues that belligerents will lack the necessary motivations to pursue peace. Therefore, the sides in a conflict will either not engage in peace negotiation, or any peace will be short-lived. Approached in game-theoretical terms, Zartman argues that the presence of an mutually hurting stalemate and a means of escaping the stalemate transform conflicts from a prisoner's dilemma to a chicken game. The durability of ceasefires can depend on the continued existence of a mutually enticing opportunity (MEO) and resolution of substantive grievances. Changes in the perceived cost-benefit analysis can result in resolution of intractable or decade-long conflicts, such as The Troubles. The Ripeness theory has been criticized for limited predictivity when time and conditions are ripe for peace.

Bottom-up theories of peace processes such as Interplay theory consider additional dimensions, such as the cost-benefit analysis for actual combatants.

== Preservation of cultural heritage ==
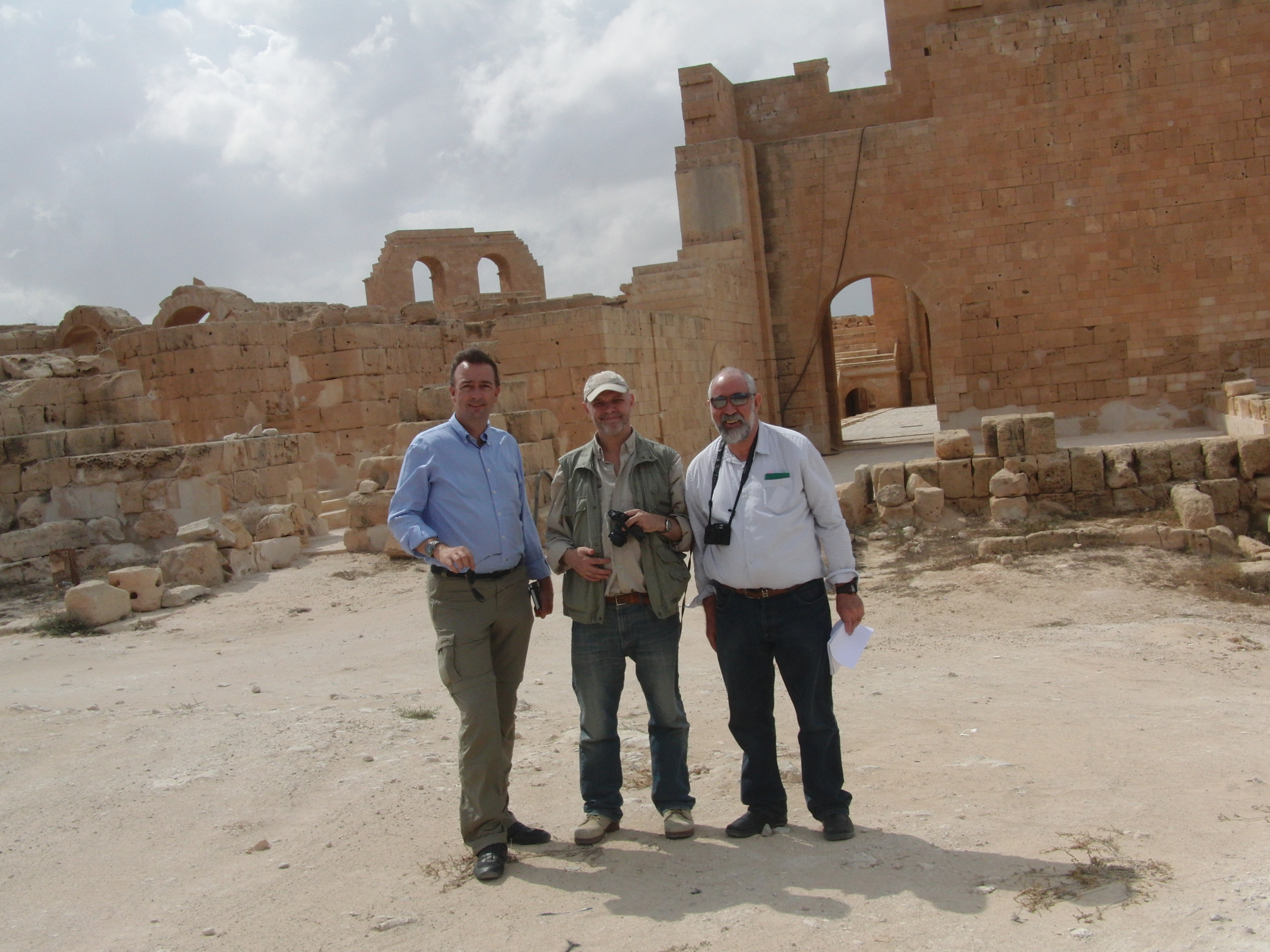
Karl von Habsburg, on a Blue Shield International fact-finding mission in Libya during the war in 2011 to protect cultural assets

In today's world, peacebuilding also means maintaining and protecting the economic and cultural foundations of a community and the population. The protection of culture and cultural assets is therefore becoming increasingly important nationally and internationally. United Nations, UNESCO and Blue Shield International deal with the protection of cultural heritage and therefore with peacebuilding. This also applies to the integration of United Nations peacekeeping.

In international law, the UN and UNESCO try to establish and enforce rules. It is not a question of protecting a person's property, but of preserving the cultural heritage of humanity, especially in the event of war and armed conflict. According to Karl von Habsburg, founding president of Blue Shield International, the destruction of cultural assets is also part of psychological warfare. The target is the opponent's identity, which is why symbolic cultural assets become a main target. It is also intended to address the particularly sensitive cultural memory, the growing cultural diversity and the economic basis (such as tourism) of a state, a region or a municipality.

== Major organizations ==
=== International organizations ===
The United Nations participates in many aspects of peacebuilding, both through the peacebuilding architecture established in 2005–2006 and through other agencies.

- Peacebuilding architecture
  - UN Peacebuilding Commission (PBC): intergovernmental advisory body that brings together key actors, gathers resources, advises on strategies for post-conflict peacebuilding and highlights issues that might undermine peace.
  - UN Peacebuilding Fund (PBF): supports peacebuilding activities that directly promote post-conflict stabilization and strengthen state and institutional capacity. PBF funding is either given for a maximum of two years immediately following conflict to jumpstart peacebuilding and recovery needs or given for up to three years to create a more structured peacebuilding process.
  - UN Peacebuilding Support Office (PBSO): supports the Peacebuilding Commission with strategic advice and policy guidance, administers the Peacebuilding Fund and helps the Secretary-General coordinate UN agencies' peacebuilding efforts.
- Other agencies
  - UN Department of Political Affairs: postconflict peacebuilding
  - UN Development Programme: conflict prevention, peacebuilding, postconflict recovery
  - UNESCO: through democracy, the promotion of human rights and global citizenship

The World Bank and International Monetary Fund focus on the economic and financial aspects of peacebuilding. The World Bank assists in post-conflict reconstruction and recovery by helping rebuild society's socioeconomic framework. The International Monetary Fund deals with post-conflict recovery and peacebuilding by acting to restore assets and production levels.

The EU's European Commission describes its peacebuilding activities as conflict prevention and management, and rehabilitation and reconstruction. Conflict prevention and management entails stopping the imminent outbreak of violence and encouraging a broad peace process. Rehabilitation and reconstruction deals with rebuilding the local economy and institutional capacity. The European Commission Conflict Prevention and Peace building 2001–2010 was subjected to a major external evaluation conducted by Aide a la Decisions Economique (ADE) with the European Centre for Development Policy Management which was presented in 2011. The European External Action Service created in 2010 also has a specific Division of Conflict Prevention, Peacebuilding and Mediation.

=== Governmental organizations ===
==== France ====
AFD logo

- French Ministry of Defence: operations include peacekeeping, political and constitutional processes, democratization, administrative state capacity, technical assistance for public finance and tax policy, and support for independent media
- French Ministry of Foreign and European Affairs: supports peace consolidation, including monitoring compliance with arms embargoes, deployment of peacekeeping troops, DDR, and deployment of police and gendarmerie in support of the rule of law
- French Development Agency: focuses on crisis prevention through humanitarian action and development

==== Germany ====
- German Federal Foreign Office: assists with conflict resolution and postconflict peacebuilding, including the establishment of stable state structures (rule of law, democracy, human rights, and security) and the creation of the potential for peace within civil society, the media, cultural affairs and education
- German Federal Ministry of Defence: deals with the destruction of a country's infrastructure resulting from intrastate conflict, security forces reform, demobilization of combatants, rebuilding the justice system and government structures and preparations for elections
- German Federal Ministry for Economic Cooperation and Development: addresses economic, social, ecological, and political conditions to help eliminate the structural causes of conflict and promote peaceful conflict management; issues addressed include poverty reduction, pro-poor sustainable economic growth, good governance and democracy

==== Japan ====
- Ministry of Foreign Affairs (MOFA): supports peacebuilding. In response to Minister Taro Aso's statement in his speech in 2007, the Ministry is conducting the project (平和構築人材育成事業) to train civilian specialists from Japan and other countries who can work in the field of peacebuilding.

==== Switzerland ====
- Federal Department of Foreign Affairs (FDFA): following the bill passed by the Swiss Federal Parliament in 2004 which outlined various measures for civil peacebuilding and human rights strengthening, the Human Security Division (HSD) of the Federal Department of Foreign Affairs (FDFA) has been responsible for implementing measures which serve to promote human security around the world. It is the competence centre for peace, human rights and humanitarian policy, and for Switzerland's migration foreign policy. To this end, the FDFA gets a line of credit to be renewed and approved by Parliament every four years (it was CHF 310 million for the 2012–2016 period.) Its main peacebuilding programmes focus on 1. the African Great Lakes region (Burundi and Democratic Republic of Congo), 2. Sudan, South Sudan and the Horn of Africa, 3. West Africa and Sahel, 4. Middle East, 5. Nepal, 6. South Eastern Europe and 7. Colombia.

==== United Kingdom ====
- UK Foreign and Commonwealth Office: performs a range of reconstruction activities required in the immediate aftermath of conflict
- UK Ministry of Defence: deals with long-term activities addressing the underlying causes of conflict and the needs of the people
- UK Department for International Development: works on conflict prevention (short-term activities to prevent the outbreak or recurrence of violent conflict) and peacebuilding (medium- and long-term actions to address the factors underlying violent conflict), including DDR programs; building the public institutions that provide security, transitional justice and reconciliation; and providing basic social services

==== United States ====
USAID logo

- United States Department of State: aids postconflict states in establishing the basis for a lasting peace, good governance and sustainable development
- United States Department of Defense: assists with reconstruction, including humanitarian assistance, public health, infrastructure, economic development, rule of law, civil administration and media; and stabilization, including security forces, communication skills, humanitarian capabilities and area expertise
- United States Agency for International Development: performs immediate interventions to build momentum in support of the peace process including supporting peace negotiations; building citizen security; promoting reconciliation; and expanding democratic political processes
- United States Institute of Peace:

=== Nongovernmental organizations ===
- Catholic Relief Services: Baltimore-based Catholic humanitarian agency that provides emergency relief post-disaster or post-conflict and encourages long-term development through peacebuilding and other activities
- Conscience: Taxes for Peace not War: Organisation in London that promotes peacebuilding as an alternative to military security via a Peace Tax Bill and reform of the £1 billion UK Conflict, Stability and Security Fund.
- Conciliation Resources: London-based independent organisation working with people in conflict to prevent violence and build peace.
- Crisis Management Initiative: Helsinki-based organization that works to resolve conflict and build sustainable peace by bringing international peacebuilding experts and local leaders together
- Generations For Peace: An Amman-based global non-profit peace-building organization dedicated to sustainable conflict transformation at the grassroots with a focus on youth.
- IIDA Women's Development Organisation is a Somali non-profit, politically independent, non-governmental organisation, created by women in order to work for peacebuilding and women's rights defence in Somalia.
- Initiatives of Change: global organization dedicated to "building trust across the world's divides" (of culture, nationality, belief, and background), involved in peacebuilding and peace consolidation since 1946 and currently in the Great Lakes area of Africa, Sierra Leone and other areas of conflict.
- Institute for Conflict Transformation and Peacebuilding (ICP): Swiss based NGO specialised in peacebuilding, non-violent conflict transformation, mediation and training delivery.
- International Alert: London-based charity that works with people affected by violent conflict to improve their prospects for peace and helps shape and strength peacebuilding policies and practices
- International Crisis Group: Brussels-based nonprofit that gives advice to governments and intergovernmental organizations on the prevention and resolution of deadly conflict
- Interpeace: Geneva-based nonprofit and strategic partner of the United Nations that works to build lasting peace by following five core principles that put people at the center of the peacebuilding process
- Jewish-Palestinian Living Room Dialogue Group: Since 1992 models and supports relationships among adversaries, while creating how-to documentary films. From 2003 to 2007, with Camp Tawonga brought hundreds of adults and youth from 50 towns in Palestine and Israel to successfully live and communicate together at the Palestinian-Jewish Family Peacemakers Camp—Oseh Shalom – Sanea al-Salam
- Karuna Center for Peacebuilding: U.S.-based international nonprofit organization that leads training and programs in post-conflict peacebuilding for government, development institutions, civil society organizations, and local communities
- Nonviolent Peaceforce: Brussels-based nonprofit that promotes and implements unarmed civilian peacekeeping as a tool for reducing violence and protecting civilians in situations of violent conflict
- Peace Direct: London-based charity that provides financial and administrative assistance to grassroots peacebuilding efforts and increases international awareness of both specific projects and grassroots peacebuilding in general;
- Search for Common Ground: international organization founded in 1982 and working in 35 countries that uses evidence-based approaches to transform the way communities deal with conflict towards cooperative solutions
- Seeds of Peace: New York City-based nonprofit that works to empower youth from areas of conflict by inviting them to an international camp in Maine for leadership training and relationship building
- Tuesday's Children: New York-based organization that brings together teens, ages 15–20, from the New York City area and around the world who share a "common bond"—the loss of a family member due to an act of terrorism. Launched in 2008, Project COMMON BOND has so far helped 308 teenagers from 15 countries and territories turn their experiences losing a loved one to terrorism into positive actions that can help others exposed to similar tragedy. Participants share the vision of the program to "Let Our Past Change the Future."
- UNOY Peacebuilders (United Network of Young Peacebuilders): The Hague-based network of young leaders and youth organizations that facilitates affiliated organizations' peacebuilding efforts through networking, sharing information, research and fundraising

=== Research and academic institutes ===
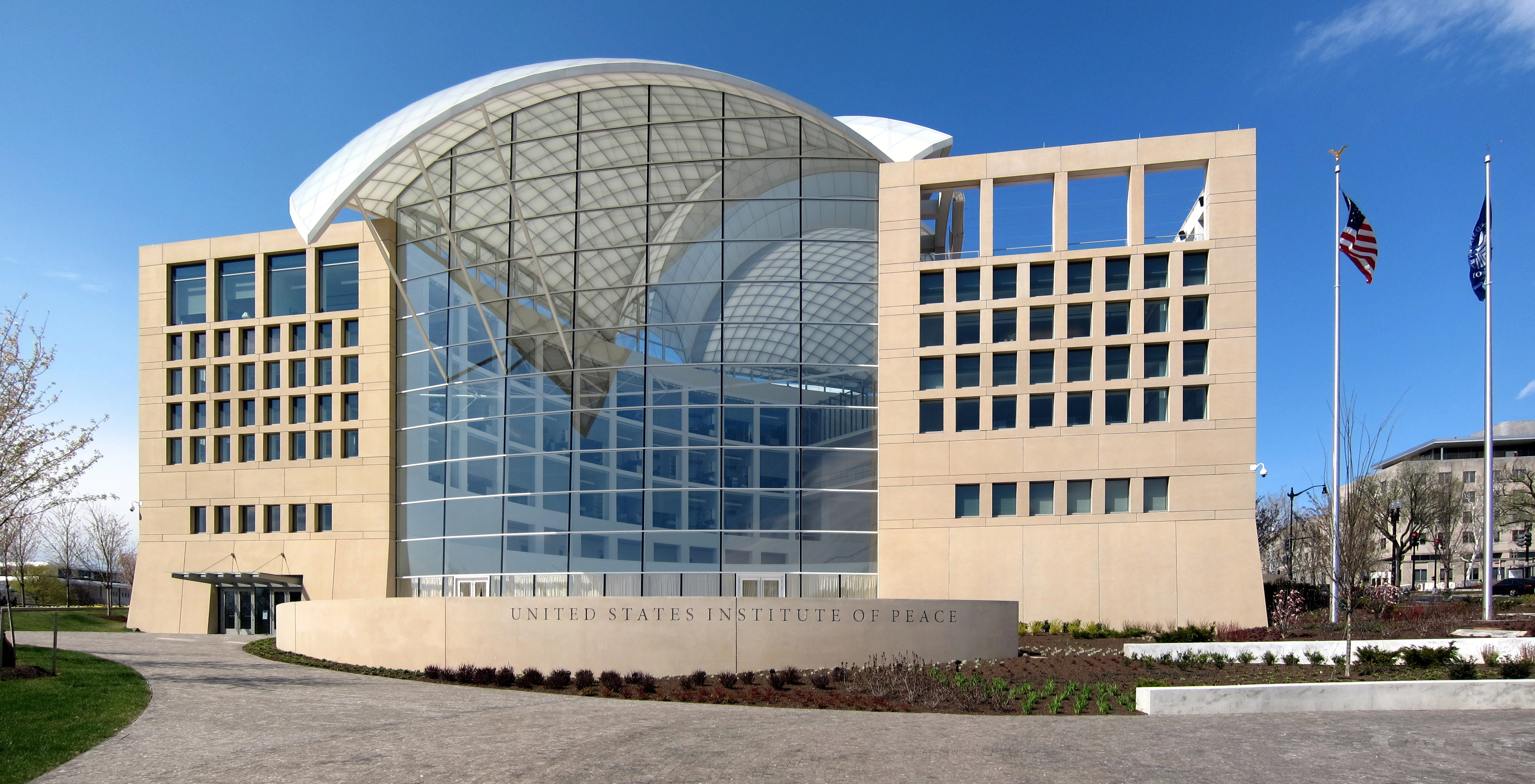
United States Institute of Peace Headquarters in Washington D.C.

- Center for Justice and Peacebuilding: academic program at Eastern Mennonite University; promotes peacebuilding, creation care, experiential learning, and cross-cultural engagement; teachings are based on Mennonite Christianity
- Center for Peacebuilding and Development: academic center at American University's School of International Service; promotes cross-cultural development of research and practices in peace education, civic engagement, nonviolent resistance, conflict resolution, religion and peace, and peacebuilding
- Irish Peace Institute: promotes peace and reconciliation in Ireland and works to apply lessons from Ireland's conflict resolution to other conflicts
- Joan B. Kroc Institute for International Peace Studies: degree-granting institute at the University of Notre Dame; promotes research, education and outreach on the causes of violent conflict and the conditions for sustainable peace
- United States Institute of Peace: non-partisan federal institution that works to prevent or end violent conflict around the world by sponsoring research and using it to inform actions
- University for Peace: international institution of higher education located in Costa Rica; aims to promote peace by engaging in teaching, research, training and dissemination of knowledge necessary for building peace
- swisspeace: a practice-oriented peace research institute that is associated with the University of Basel, Switzerland; analyzes the causes of violent conflicts and develops strategies for their peaceful transformation.
- CDA Collaborative Learning Projects: an action research and advisory organization dedicated to improving the effectiveness and accountability of peacebuilding, development, and humanitarian efforts wherever communities experience conflict.

== Role of women ==
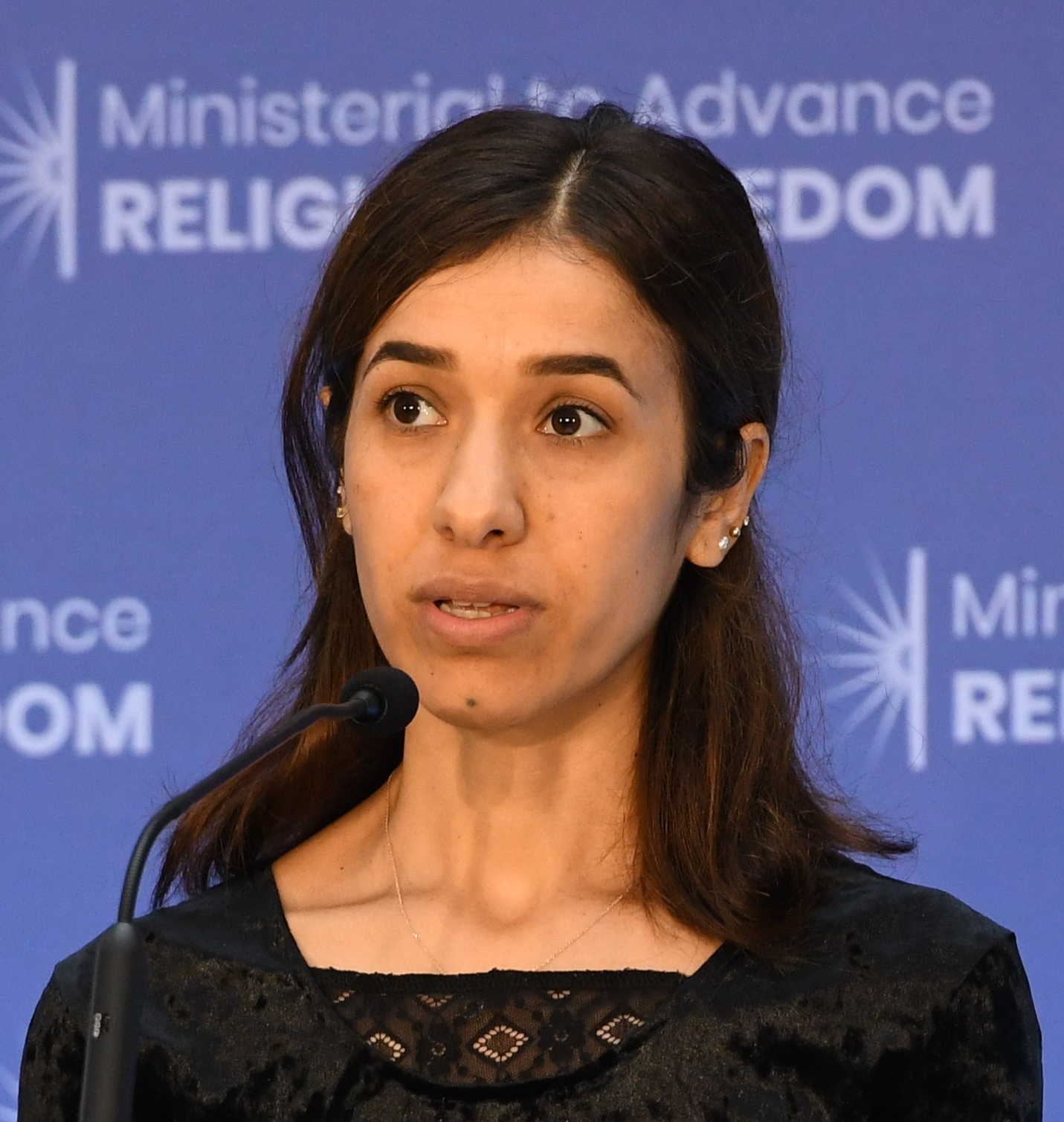
Nadia Murad was awarded the Nobel Peace Prize for "efforts to end the use of sexual violence as a weapon of war and armed conflict.

Women have traditionally played a limited role in peacebuilding processes even though they often bear the responsibility for providing for their families' basic needs in the aftermath of violent conflict. They are especially likely to be unrepresented or underrepresented in negotiations, political decision-making, upper-level policymaking and senior judicial positions. Many societies' patriarchal cultures prevent them from recognizing the role women can play in peacebuilding. However, many peacebuilding academics and the United Nations have recognized that women play a vital role in securing the three pillars of sustainable peace: economic recovery and reconciliation, social cohesion and development and political legitimacy, security and governance.

In October 2000, United Nations Security Council Resolution 1325 (S/RES/1325) on women, peace, and security was adopted unanimously by the UN Security Council, after recalling resolutions 1261 (1999), 1265 (1999), 1296 (2000), and 1314 (2000). The resolution acknowledged the disproportionate and unique impact of armed conflict on women and girls. It calls for the adoption of a gender perspective to consider the special needs of women and girls during conflict, repatriation and resettlement, rehabilitation, reintegration, and post-conflict reconstruction.

In 2010, at the request of the Security Council, the Secretary-General issued an updated report on women's participation in peacebuilding. The report outlines the challenges women continue to face in participating in recovery and peacebuilding process and the negative impact this exclusion has on them and societies more broadly. To respond to these challenges, it advocates a comprehensive 7-point action plan covering the seven commitment areas: mediation; post-conflict planning; financing; civilian capacity; post-conflict governance; rule of law; and economic recovery. The action plan aims to facilitate progress on the women, peace and security agenda. The monitoring and implementation of this action plan is now being led jointly by the Peacebuilding Support Office and UN Women. In April 2011, the two organizations convened a workshop to ensure that women are included in future post-disaster and post-conflict planning documents. In the same year, the PBF selected seven gender-sensitive peacebuilding projects to receive $5 million in funding.

Porter discusses the growing role of female leadership in countries prone to war and its impact on peacebuilding. When the book was written, seven countries prone to violent conflict had female heads of state. Ellen Johnson-Sirleaf of Liberia and Michelle Bachelet of Chile were the first female heads of state from their respective countries and President Johnson-Sirleaf was the first female head of state in Africa. Both women utilized their gender to harness "the power of maternal symbolism - the hope that a woman could best close wounds left on their societies by war and dictatorship."

== Examples in early 21st century ==
UN PBC and PBF projects as of 2012 UN PBF projects as of 2012

The UN Peacebuilding Commission works in Burundi, Central African Republic, Guinea, Guinea-Bissau, Liberia and Sierra Leone and the UN Peacebuilding Fund funds projects in Burundi, Central African Republic, Chad, Comoros, Côte d'Ivoire, the Democratic Republic of the Congo, Guinea, Guinea Bissau, Guatemala, Haiti, Kenya, Kyrgyzstan, Lebanon, Liberia, Nepal, Niger, Sierra Leone, Somalia, Sri Lanka, Sudan, South Sudan, Timor-Leste and Uganda. Other UN organizations are working in Haiti (MINUSTAH), Lebanon, Afghanistan, Kosovo and Iraq.

The World Bank's International Development Association maintains the Trust Fund for East Timor in Timor-Leste. The TFET has assisted reconstruction, community empowerment and local governance in the country.

After it had carried out the War in Afghanistan and the War in Iraq, the United States followed its attacks on the two countries by investing $104 billion in reconstruction and relief efforts. The Iraq Relief and Reconstruction Fund alone received $21 billion during FY2003 and FY2004. The money came from the United States Department of State, the United States Agency for International Development and the United States Department of Defense and included funding for security, health, education, social welfare, governance, economic growth and humanitarian issues.

Civil society organisations contribute to peacebuilding, as is the case in Kenya, according to the magazine D+C Development and Cooperation. After the election riots in Kenya in 2008, civil society organisations started programmes to avoid similar disasters in the future, such as the Truth, Justice and Reconciliation Commission (TJRC) and peace meetings organised by the church. They supported the National Cohesion and Integration Commission.

== Results ==
In 2010, the UNPBC conducted a review of its work with the first four countries on its agenda. An independent review by the Pulitzer Center on Crisis Reporting also highlighted some of the PBC's early successes and challenges.

One comprehensive study finds that UN peacebuilding missions significantly increase the likelihood of democratization.

== Criticisms ==
Jennifer Hazen contends there are two major debates relating to peacebuilding; the first centres on the role of the liberal democratic model in designing peacebuilding activities and measuring outcomes and the other one questions the role of third-party actors in peacebuliding.

Regarding the debate about the role of the liberal democratic model in peacebuilding, one side contends that liberal democracy is a viable end goal for peacebuilding activities in itself but that the activities implemented to achieve it need to be revised; a rushed transition to democratic elections and market economy can undermine stability and elections held or economic legislation enacted are an inappropriate yardstick for success. Institutional change is necessary and transitions need to be incremental.

Another side contends that liberal democracy might be an insufficient or even inappropriate goal for peacebuilding efforts and that the focus must be on a social transformation to develop non-violent mechanisms of conflict resolution regardless of their form.

With regards to the role of third-party actors, David Chandler contends that external support creates dependency and undermines local and domestic politics, thus undermining autonomy and the capacity for self-governance and leaving governments weak and dependent on foreign assistance once the third-party actors depart. Since the logic of peacebuilding relies on building and strengthening institutions to alter societal beliefs and behaviour, success relies on the populations' endorsement of these institutions. Any third party attempt at institution building without genuine domestic support will result in hollow institutions - this can lead to a situation in which democratic institutions are established before domestic politics have developed in a liberal, democratic fashion, and an unstable polity.

Séverine Autesserre offers a different approach, which focuses on the role of everyday practices in peacebuilding. She argue that the foreign peace builders' everyday practices, habits, and narratives strongly influence peacebuilding effectiveness. Autesserre stresses that international peacebuilders do not fully understand the conflicts they are trying to resolve because they rarely include local leaders in decision making, do not speak the local languages, and do not stay posted long enough to oversee effective change. This leaves decision makers out of touch with the key players in the peacebuilding process.

Jeremy Weinstein challenges the assumption that weak and failing states cannot rebuild themselves. He contends that through the process of autonomous recovery, international peacekeeping missions can be unnecessary for recovery because they assume that conflicts cannot be resolved by the country internally. He describes autonomous recovery as a "process through which countries achieve a lasting peace, a systematic reduction in violence, and postwar political and economic development in the absence of international intervention". Through peace and institutions generated by allowing war to run its natural course, autonomous recovery can be viewed as a success. He claims that war leads to peace by allowing the naturally stronger belligerent gain power, rather than a brokered peace deal that leaves two sides still capable of fighting. Secondly he claims that war provides a competition among providers of public goods until one can control a monopoly. He says that war can create an incentive to create institutions at all levels in order to consolidate power and extract resources from the citizens while also giving some power to the citizens depending upon how much the institutions rely on them for tax revenues.

Virginia Fortna of Columbia University, however, holds that peacekeeping interventions actually do substantively matter following the end of a civil war. She claims that selection bias, where opponents point only to failed peacekeeping interventions and do not compare these missions to those situations where interventions do not occur, is partly to blame for criticisms. Fortna says that peacekeeping missions rarely go into easily resolvable situations while they are sent into tougher, more risky post war situations where missions are more likely to fail, and peace agreements are unlikely to be committed to. When all factors of a certain peacekeeping case study are properly considered, Fortna shows that peacekeeping missions do in fact help increase the chances of sustained peace after a civil war.

The case of Timor-Leste can be seen as appeasement without addressing underlying conflict grievances.

In recent years, there has been a growing trend towards approaches that view art and culture as essential components of peacebuilding and that criticize their marginalization in traditional approaches. Peacebuilding and the Arts, edited by Jolyon Mitchell, Giselle Vincett, Theodora Hawksley, and Hal Culbertson in 2020, for example, explores the potential and limitations of various artistic disciplines such as theater, visual arts, and music for peacebuilding. Latest approaches highlight the role of popular culture in peacebuilding, as demonstrated, for example, by political scientist Siobhan McEvoy-Levy in her book Peace and Resistance in Youth Cultures: Reading the Politics of Peacebuilding from Harry Potter to The Hunger Games (2018) or by art historian Jörg Scheller in his scholarly article “Disposable Hero? Heavy Metal as Peacebuilding” (2025), in which he examines the aesthetics of Heavy metal music as a counterintuitive medium for peacebuilding.

=== Implementation ===
Michael N. Barnett et al. criticize peacebuilding organizations for undertaking supply-driven rather than demand-driven peacebuilding; they provide the peacebuilding services in which their organization specializes, not necessarily those that the recipient most needs. In addition, he argues that many of their actions are based on organizations precedent rather than empirical analysis of which interventions are and are not effective. More recently, Ben Hillman has criticized international donor efforts to strengthen local governments in the wake of conflict. He argues that international donors typically do not have the knowledge, skills or resources to bring meaningful change to the way post-conflict societies are governed.

=== Perpetuation of cultural hegemony ===
Many academics argue that peacebuilding is a manifestation of liberal internationalism and therefore imposes Western values and practices onto other cultures. Mac Ginty states that although peacebuilding does not project all aspects of Western culture on to the recipient states, it does transmit some of them, including concepts like neoliberalism that the West requires recipients of aid to follow more closely than most Western countries do. Barnett also comments that the promotion of liberalization and democratization may undermine the peacebuilding process if security and stable institutions are not pursued concurrently. Richmond has shown how 'liberal peacebuilding' represents a political encounter that may produce a post-liberal form of peace. Local and international actors, norms, institutions and interests engage with each other in various different contexts, according to their respective power relations and their different conceptions of legitimate authority structures. Knowles and Matisek adapt to the inherent problem of peacebuilding by arguing for a better vision of security force assistance (SFA) - donor states/actors trying to build effective host-nation security forces in a weak state - where they shift the focus from military effectiveness (a typical western hegemonic approach) to one that empowers local informal security actors to take ownership of their security and to be a part of the strategic vision of the state. Such an approach attempts to bypass the inherent flaws of SFA imposing a Western security architecture on a state that does not have the institutions, resources, or civil-military relations to support this 'alien' form of security sector reform (SSR).

== See also ==
- Environmental peacebuilding
- Religion and peacebuilding
- Peace and conflict studies
- Peacebuilding in Jammu and Kashmir
- Nation-building
- Reconciliation studies
- State-building

== References and further reading ==
- Adhikari, Monalisa. "Peacebuilding with “Chinese characteristics”? Insights from China's engagement in Myanmar's peace process." International Studies Review 23.4 (2021): 1699-1726.
- Andersson, Ruben; Weigand, Florian (2015). "Intervention at Risk: The Vicious Cycle of Distance and Danger in Mali and Afghanistan". Journal of Intervention and Statebuilding. 9 (4): 519–541. doi:10.1080/17502977.2015.1054655. S2CID 142711187.
- Autesserre, Severine (2014). Peaceland: Conflict Resolution and the Everyday Politics of International Intervention. UK: Cambridge University Press.
- Barnett, Michael; Kim, Hunjoon; O'Donnell, Madalene; Sitea, Laura (2007). "Peacebuilding: What Is in a Name?". Global Governance. 13: 35–58. doi:10.1163/19426720-01301004. S2CID 143099117.
- Doyle, Michael W., and Nicholas Sambanis. "International peacebuilding: A theoretical and quantitative analysis." American political science review 94.4 (2000): 779-801. online
- Duffield, Mark R. (2010). "Risk-Management and the Fortified Aid Compound: Everyday Life in Post-Interventionary Society". Journal of Intervention and Statebuilding. 4 (4): 453–474. doi:10.1080/17502971003700993. S2CID 143968012.
- Keating, Tom; Knight, W., eds. (2004). Building Sustainable Peace. Canada: United Nations University Press and The University of Alberta Press. ISBN 978-92-808-1101-8.
- Kopelman, Shirli (February 2020). "Tit for tat and beyond: the legendary work of Anatol Rapoport". Negotiation and Conflict Management Research. 13 (1): 60–84. doi:10.1111/ncmr.12172. hdl:2027.42/153763.
- Mac Ginty, Roger (2011). International Peacebuilding and Local Resistance. United Kingdom: Palgrave Macmillan. ISBN 978-0-230-27376-4.
- McEvoy-Levy, Siobhan (2018). Peace and Resistance in Youth Cultures: Reading the Politics of Peacebuilding from Harry Potter to The Hunger Games. London: Palgrave Macmillan. ISBN 978-1-137-49870-0.
- Mitchell, Jolyon, and Giselle Vincett, Theodora Hawksley, Hal Culbertson, eds. (2020). Peacebuilding and the Arts. London: Palgrave Macmillan. ISBN 978-3-030-17874-1.
- Ndura-Ouédraogo and, Elavie; Amster, Randall, eds. (2009). Building Cultures of Peace: Transdisciplinary Voices of Hope and Action. Newcastle, UK: Cambridge Scholars Publishing. ISBN 9781443813297. OCLC 435734902.
- "Peace, Peacebuilding, Peacemaking" (PDF). Berghof Glossary on Conflict Transformation. Berlin, Germany: Berghof Foundation. 2012. pp. 59–64. ISBN 978-3-941514-09-6.
- Porter, Elisabeth (2007). Peacebuilding: Women in International Perspective. Oxon, UK: Routledge. ISBN 978-0-415-39791-9.
- Rae, James DeShaw. Peacebuilding and Transitional Justice in East Timor (Lynne Rienner Publishers, 2022).
- Richmond, Oliver (2011). A Post-Liberal Peace. UK: Routledge.
- Sandole, Dennis (2010). Peacebuilding. Cambridge, UK: Polity Press. ISBN 978-0-7456-4165-2.
- Scheller, Jörg (2025). "Disposable Hero? Heavy Metal as Peacebuilding". In: Pichler/Höpflinger/Scheller/Dawes/Béra (eds.), Meta/Metal. Open Questions in Metal Studies, Stuttgart: Kohlhammer Verlag. doi.org/10.17433/978-3-17-043459-2.
- Schirch, Lisa (2006). Little Book of Strategic Peacebuilding. Little Books of Justice & Peacebuilding. Intercourse, PA: Good Books. ISBN 9781561484270. OCLC 56111659.
- Schirch, Lisa (2013). Conflict Assessment and Peacebuilding Planning: Toward a Participatory Approach to Human Security. Boulder, Colo.: Kumarian Press. ISBN 9781565495784. OCLC 805831468.
- Bojicic-Dzelilovic, Vesna (2017). "Owning the Peace in International Interventions: a Delusion or a Possibility?". DataverseNL. doi:10.34894/JXQNOX. hdl:10411/20875.
- Tarnoff, Curt; Marian L. Lawson (2011). Foreign Aid: An Introduction to U.S. Programs and Policy (Technical report). Congressional Research Service. R40213.
- Walters, Diana; Laven, Daniel; Davis, Peter (2017). Heritage & Peacebuilding. Suffolk, UK: Boydell Press. ISBN 9781783272167. Archived from the original on 2017-03-31.
