= Basel Peace Forum =

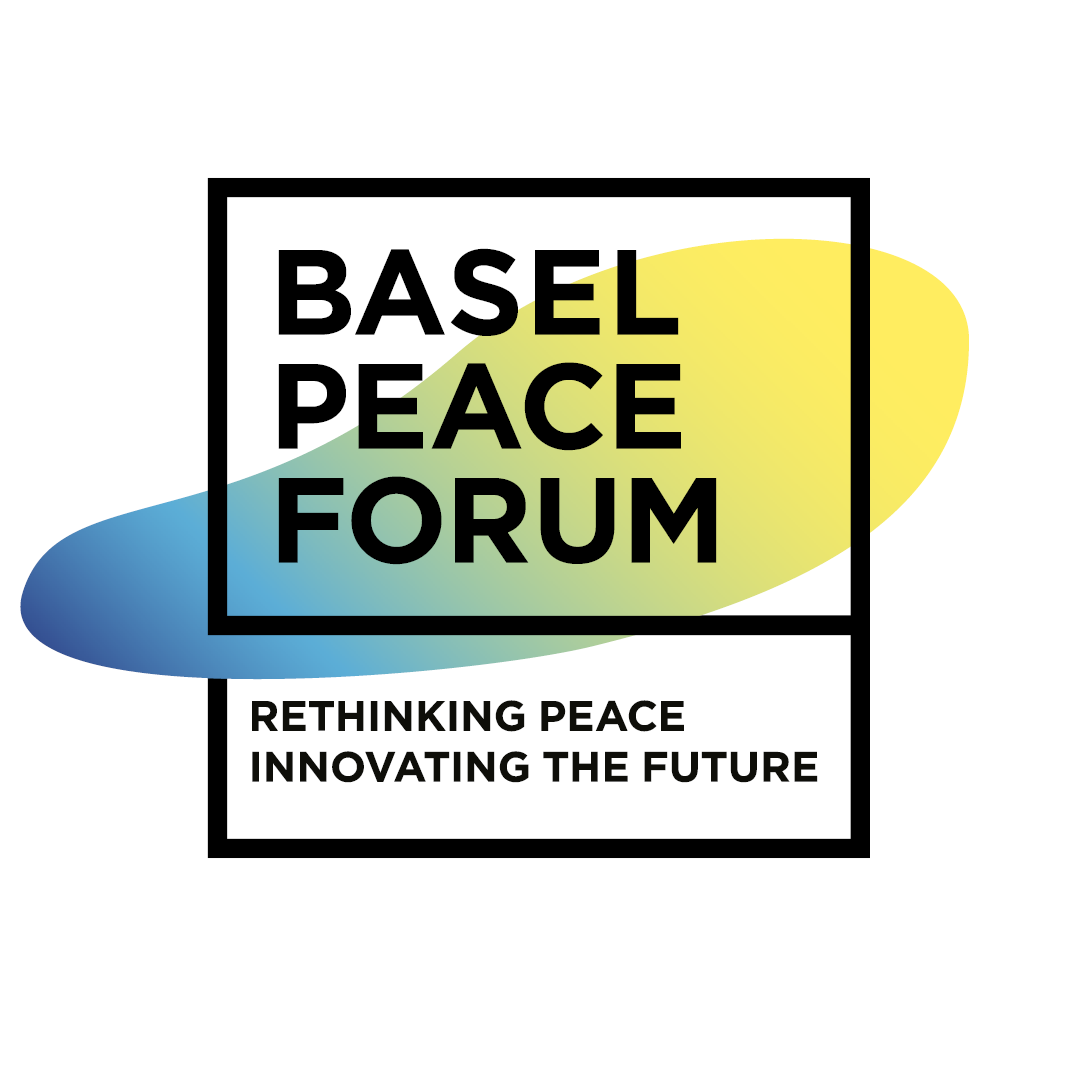
- Rethinking Peace. Innovating the Future.
- Abbreviation: BPF
- Founder: swisspeace
- Founded at: Basel
- Type: International Conference
- Purpose: Peacebuilding, Peace Research, Innovation
- Headquarters: Basel
- Official language: English
- Key people: Basel Peace Forum Patron Committee
- Parent organization: swisspeace
- Affiliations: University of Basel, Swiss Academies of Arts and Sciences
- Website: https://basel-peace.org/

The Basel Peace Forum is a Swiss initiative to further innovation in peacebuilding which is based in Basel, Switzerland. It was founded in 2016 by the Swiss Peace Foundation (swisspeace) and holds annual meetings in January in Basel. It aims to unit representatives from the economy, science, politics and society to reflect on previous endeavors and generate new ideas for peace and peacebuilding.

== Organization ==
The forum is hosted and operated by swisspeace. However, it has its own Patron Committee, which serves to incorporate it within society and an advisory board composed by swisspeace members to take on the operative business. It is financially supported by the city of Basel, the Swiss Federal Departement of Foreign Affairs and by contributions from private donors.

== Vision ==
The Basel Peace Forum intends to inspire new ideas for peacebuilding.

== Activities ==
=== Basel Peace Forum 2017: Rethinking Peace. Innovating the Future. ===
From January 15 to 16 the first edition of the Basel Peace Forum took place in the Basel Messehalle and was partnered by the European Institute of Peace. It concluded that despite many international efforts, setbacks have called earlier successes of peacebuilding into question. The participants also have called on world leaders to strengthen responsive and responsible leadership for peace within the United Nations, the G8 or the World Economic Forum.

=== Basel Peace Forum 2018 ===
The second edition of the Basel Peace Forum took place from January 14 to 15 in Basel.

=== Basel Peace Forum 2019 ===
The third edition of the Basel Peace Forum was held January 13 to 14 in Basel and focused on the potential of AI and Big Data in mediation, health issues on migration routes, peacebuilding investment and architecture in a post-conflict context.

=== Basel Peace Forum 2020: Cities of Peace? ===
The fourth edition of the Basel Peace Forum took place from January 9 to 10 in Basel and dealt with the topic of cities in times of conflict and peace. Among the over 50 speakers and experts present on the event were the artists Zehra Doğan, Omaïd Sharifi and Yescka.

=== Basel Peace Forum 2021 ===
The 2021 edition of the Basel Peace Forum focused on the impact of the COVID-19 pandemic on peace and conflict in cities around the world. The event, which took place virtually on January 20 to 21 2021, brought together experts and decision-makers from a variety of fields to discuss and explore solutions to the challenges posed by the pandemic.

One of the main themes of the forum was the impact of the pandemic on urban areas, including the potential for increased segmentation, division, and competition, as well as the possibility for greater collaboration and joint endeavors. The event featured a range of panels and keynote speeches from figures in politics, business, civil society, and academia, providing attendees with the opportunity to engage in discussions and workshops on these and other related topics.

=== Basel Peace Forum 2022 ===
The sixth edition of the Basel Peace Forum took place from January 20 to 21st in Basel and virtually. The forum focused on the connections between peace, conflict, and two main themes: the role of cities in fostering peace and the power of emotions.

On the first day of the event, attendees had the opportunity to discuss and explore how cities can address challenges such as climate change, migration, and public health while promoting peace. The second day of the forum focused on the role of emotions in peacebuilding and conflict prevention, including how to navigate between facts and fiction in a digital world, the potential for chatbots to be used in peacebuilding efforts, and the role of journalists in preventing violent conflicts.
