= Jonah Wittkamper =

Jonah Wittkamper is a biologist, technologist, startup founder and social entrepreneur. He is the Co-Founder and President of the NEXUS, a movement to help wealthy families engage in charity and impact investing. In 2020, he founded the Amazon Investor Coalition to advance forest friendly economic development and the rule of law. In addition, in 2017, he created the Healthy Democracy Coalition, a network of philanthropists dedicated to bridging political divides.

Wittkamper works to unite young social and philanthropic leaders to influence the public sector, including the United Nations, the White House and the United States Congress. Earlier in his career, he co-founded the Global Youth Action Network, a global association of youth organizations that merged with TakingITGlobal and grew to become one of the largest communities of young social change leaders on the internet. In 2007, he joined Distributive Networks and helped to build the text messaging technology of the 2008 Obama campaign and in 2015 he served as an advisor to the Council on Foundations' Evolution of Philanthropy Initiative. He has worked as the United States Director of Search for Common Ground and is the founder and owner of EZinTouch.com, a contact management platform. He is an alumnus of Williams College, Saint Ann's School (Brooklyn) and Camp Rising Sun.

== Prior to NEXUS ==
Before co-founding NEXUS, Wittkamper served in various roles that focused on impacting and inspiring youth leaders across the world. Beginning in 2000, Wittkamper co-founded the Global Youth Action Network (GYAN). Through the help of Wittkamper, GYAN reinforced the participation of youth in global decision-making. Wittkamper served as the Chief Technology Officer and opened the South American Regional Office, which he ran until 2006. Soon, GYAN merged with TakingITGlobal, as mentioned previously. TakingITGlobal quickly became the largest Internet site dedicated to the empowerment of young leaders, receiving almost 2 million hits every day.

== Family ==
Jonah Wittkamper is the grandson of Will Wittkamper, a former steward of Koinonia Farm. This is the inter-racial Christian intentional community in Americus, Georgia, that inspired the creation of Habitat for Humanity. The Wittkamper family is profiled in the book Class of 65. Wittkamper is also a grand-nephew of George S. Vest, former Director General of the US Foreign Service.
