= Generations For Peace =

Jordanian non-governmental organisation

- Founded: 2007
- Founded at: Amman, Jordan
- Type: International non-governmental organization
- Purpose: Peacebuilding; Youth leadership Conflict transformation Curriculum development
- Headquarters: Al Hussein Youth City, Amman, Jordan
- Region served: Worldwide
- Founder and chairman: Prince Feisal Al Hussein, Lama Hattab (CEO)
- Employees: 60
- Website: generationsforpeace.org

Generations For Peace (GFP) is a Jordanian non-governmental organisation based in Amman dedicated to peacebuilding through sustainable conflict transformation at the grassroots. Founded in 2007 by Prince Feisal Al Hussein, GFP has worked with and empowered volunteer leaders of youth in 51 countries around the world to promote active tolerance and responsible citizenship in communities experiencing various forms of conflict and violence. As a peace-through-sports organisations officially recognised by the International Olympic Committee, it uses sport-based games, art, advocacy, dialogue, and empowerment activities to serve as an entry point for engaging children, youth, and adults, and to promote integrated education and sustained behavioural change.

== History ==
Generations For Peace was founded as a peace-through-sports initiative of the Jordan Olympic Committee in 2007, but has since expanded to include art, advocacy, dialogue, and empowerment as tools to bring peace to communities facing division and conflict. Since its founding, the organisation has trained more than 16,000 volunteers and reached over 780,000 children, youth, and adults across Africa, Europe, Asia, and the Middle East as of 2019. It has also been supported by a variety of partners, including the European Union, UNICEF, USAID, UNESCO, International Olympic Committee, Samsung, and the University of Oxford.

Generations For Peace established a research institute, the Generations For Peace Institute, in 2010.

== Model ==
Generations For Peace uses a volunteer cascading model in which trained volunteers in turn train future volunteers in their home communities, ensuring that programmes and ideas are spread while remaining true to their original design.

Generations For Peace has trained youth volunteers in regions affected by conflict across 50 countries around the globe.

== Locations ==
=== Satellite Offices ===
- Sarajevo, Bosnia and Herzegovina
- Kaduna, Nigeria
- Garoowe and Mogadishu, Somalia
- Juba, South Sudan
- Khartoum, Sudan

=== Countries with GFP Programmes ===
All countries with currently active GFP Programmes as of 2020 are highlighted in bold.

Afghanistan	Algeria	Armenia	Azerbaijan	Bangladesh
Belarus	Bosnia and Herzegovina	Burundi	Côte d'Ivoire	Cyprus
Egypt	Gambia	**Georgia**	**Ghana**	India
**Indonesia**	**Iraq**	**Jordan**	Kenya	Kosovo
**Kyrgyzstan**	**Lebanon**	Lesotho	Liberia	Libya
Madagascar	**Nepal**	**Nigeria**	**North Macedonia, Republic of**	**Pakistan**
**Palestine**	Russian Federation	**Rwanda**	Senegal	Serbia
**Sierra Leone**	Somalia	**South Sudan**	**Sri Lanka**	**Sudan**
Tajikistan	Timor-Leste	Togo	**Tunisia**	Turkmenistan
**Uganda**	Ukraine	**Yemen**	Zambia	**Zimbabwe**

== Research Partners ==
- Uppsala University
- Georgetown University
- University of the Western Cape
- Institute for Conflict Transformation and Peacebuilding
- University of Oxford
