= Healthy Democracy Coalition =

American National Non-profit Organization

The Healthy Democracy Coalition was an American national non-profit organization dedicated to cross-partisan philanthropic learning and collaboration. Founded by Jonah Wittkamper, the Coalition managed a network of philanthropists, convened events, and developed strategies for collective action. Catalyzed years earlier, the group formally launched in 2017 with support from the Hewlett Foundation and the Fetzer Institute. The organization had local chapters in dozens of cities across the country. The group was developed over years of coalition building through events at the White House and the United States Congress that were facilitated by NEXUS in collaboration with a Council of Advisors from across the political spectrum, representing several of the most influential partisan donor networks in the country. In 2020, the organization redirected its membership to join forces with the Leadership Now Project to invest in the integrity of US democracy.
