= UNOY Peacebuilders =

International non-governmental organization

The United Network of Young Peacebuilders (UNOY Peacebuilders) is a global network of young people and youth organisations active in the field of peacebuilding and conflict transformation. UNOY Peacebuilders was founded in 1989 and is working with youth mostly in violent conflict and post war regions. The core activities of UNOY Peacebuilders are capacity building as well as advocacy and campaigning.

The organisation is non-political, non-religious and non-governmental and welcomes youth membership regardless of gender, colour, ethnicity, social class, religion, sexual orientation or any other status.

== Activities ==
Besides the core programs on capacity building and advocacy and campaigning, UNOY Peacebuilders support its members by providing networking possibilities, sharing information, providing a pool of resource persons, carrying out research, fundraising as well as giving administrational support. UNOY Peacebuilders also runs a gender program that aims to mainstream gender within the network.

Since the start, UNOY Peacebuilders has organised a number of international working group meetings, peacebuilding training seminars and global and regional conferences. An important focus of UNOY’s peacebuilding activities has been on Eastern Europe (Russia, Belarus, Caucasus, Ukraine), Africa and Latin America. In 1996, 1997 and 2006, UNOY Peacebuilders organised peacebuilding training seminars in Crimea. Young people who have participated in former UNOY events have created effective local and regional organisations or projects working for peacebuilding in the Balkans, in the Caucasus area, and in Africa with extensive outreach capacity to local youth.

== History ==
In 1993, UNOY convened the International Conference of Young Peacebuilders on Axes of Conflict and the Role of Youth in Non-Violent Conflict Resolution and Reconciliation in the Peace Palace in The Hague, Netherlands. The aim of this conference was to explore the possibilities in conflict regions for youth to play a more dynamic role in the prevention, transformation and solution of conflicts, as well as in the promotion of mutual understanding and reconciliation between the conflicting sides. The young participants then recognised a unique peacebuilding role for UNOY and suggested that it adopt the following objectives: - to provide youth NGO leadership training in the field of non-violent conflict resolution and reconciliation; - to organise conferences and cross-conflict working groups for representatives of youth peace organisations, networks, and initiatives; - to develop a global peacebuilding, reconciliation and solidarity network focusing on youth

Following these recommendations, UNOY successfully organised three major regional peacebuilding conferences and training seminars for the Caucasus and Crimea, and the UNOY Global Youth Peace Conference (GYPC) which took place in May 1999 in the Netherlands. In addition to this event, UNOY created a global network designed to interconnect a vast range of young peacebuilders and activists.

Inspired by the success of its regional work in Eastern Europe, UNOY extended its work to empower the capacities of African youth committed to building peace in Africa. In June–July 2001, the UNOY African Youth for a Culture of Peace Training Conference in South Africa gathered 90 youth activists (17–30 years old) from all regions of Africa. As a result, the African Network of Young Peacebuilders (ANYP) was created, setting up working groups and starting the organising of regional and national activities.

In November 2002, UNOY and ANYP organised the African Young Peacebuilders Training Seminar in Cotonou, Benin; it was followed in December same year by the National Training Conference on a Culture of Peace, Networking and NGO Project Management in Freetown, Sierra Leone. A large number of other projects carried out at a local level have followed since these landmark events.

Since 1999, UNOY has organised the annual African Students Conference (ASC) at the Institute of Social Studies (ISS) in The Hague, Netherlands. Since 2005, UNOY has organised training seminars twice a year.

In 2005, UNOY Peacebuilders was invited by the Municipality of The Hague to move its headquarters to The Hague in the context of developing The Hague as the International City of Peace and Justice. The same year, UNOY was invited to take part in and contribute towards the Global Partnership for the Prevention of Armed Conflict (GPPAC) global conference in New York. Furthermore, in 2005 UNOY held the first Dutch Building Peace Skills Training, celebrated the International Day of Peace for the first time and sent their Youth Advocacy Team to visit UN in New York.

2006 and 2007 marked a great deal of organizational changes at UNOY, and the network developed from a loose network into a Membership-based one. The International Steering Group also held its first meeting in the Hague in 2007.

In 2008, UNOY started developing their Gender Programme, and the following year they participated in the COE Study Session on Gender Equality in Youth Peacebuilding Projects as well as held two gender trainings in the Netherlands. Aside from that, UNOY published “Youth Advocacy for Culture of Peace” in 2008 and “Partners for Peace” in 2009.

In 2010, UNOY marked the end of Decade for a Culture of Peace and non-violence for Children of the World, which they had been participating in since 2001. Throughout the year, UNOY took part in coordinating the Civil Society Report on the International Decade for a Culture of Peace. The report was presented in December at the End of Decade conference in Spain.

In 2015 UNOY's advocacy efforts culminated in the adoption of the United Nations Security Council Resolution 2250 on youth, peace and security. The UNOY advocacy work is mainly coordinated and run by the Youth Advocacy Team. The team consists of representatives of member organisations, young peacebuilders active in their own local communities making their voice heard globally through the Youth Advocacy Team. Additionally, UNOY has permanent advocacy representatives based in New York and Geneva who work on a voluntary basis to represent young peacebuilders towards different United Nations bodies.

== See also ==
- Conflict Resolution
- Peacebuilding
- Culture of Peace
- NGOs

NGOs working in peacebuilding

- Search for Common Ground
- Global Youth Action Network
- International Crisis Group
- International Alert
