= Global Youth Action Network =

Youth empowerment organization

The Global Youth Action Network (GYAN) is an international network of youth NGOs spanning 180 countries, and headquartered in New York, near the United Nations. GYAN is a youth-led not for profit organization (registered in 2001, New York [USA], under section 501[c]3) that incubates global partnerships and increases youth participation in decision-making. GYAN has registered chapters in Brazil, Colombia, France, Ghana, Mexico, and South Africa, with teams working out of an additional eight countries.

GYAN is known for co-coordinating Global Youth Service Day, a program of Youth Service America, since its launch in 2000. These have grown into the world's largest annual celebration of young volunteers, with millions of participants. The organization has also worked to increase youth participation and channel youth voices into policy-making at international institutions, such as the United Nations, where it holds Special Consultative Status with the Economic and Social Council (ECOSOC), and Affiliate Status with the Department of Public Information.

GYAN catalogs and helps to connect youth groups to each other, to information, resources and opportunities that empower their work for social change. Membership is open to any organization that does not promote hatred or violence towards others, and that is youth-led, youth-serving or youth-friendly. GYAN's 600 member organizations help determine future priorities for the Network, working to implement a "5-Level Model of Effective Youth Organizing", based on Ken Wilber's Integral theory and 10 years of organizing experience.

Through a partnership with TakingITGlobal, an active Internet community of student organizers, volunteers and activists, GYAN has helped to catalog more than 10,000 youth organizations on-line. GYAN's YouthLinkExpress e-newsletter reaches tens of thousands of subscribing individuals, institutions and leaders in the youth development and other sectors.

== Mission ==
The Global Youth Action Network aims to:

- increase youth participation and intergenerational partnership in decision-making
- facilitate greater collaboration among youth organizations
- create support and broader recognition for positive youth action

== Vision ==
GYAN envisions millions of young people working together towards a more just, peaceful and sustainable world, where youth are seen as key stakeholders and are active participants in the design of their future. GYAN believes that critical issues facing the planet today demand every generation's attention and action, and that youth are instrumental in movements for positive social change.

== Programs ==
GYAN also helps to organize the following initiatives:

- Global Youth Service Day
- Youth Movement for Democracy
- Global Youth Coalition on HIV/AIDS
- Local Jam
- Chat the Planet TV
- Global Youth Action Awards
- Millennium Development Goals Youth Campaign
- G-Sync

== History ==
The Global Youth Action Network evolved out of the United Nations Youth Assembly Project, proposed by 18-year-old Benjamin Quinto in 1996, and the work of other young organizers, including Bremley Lyngdoh and Jonah Wittkamper. During the Hague Appeal for Peace (May 1999, The Netherlands), and the United Youth Conference (July 1999, USA), young people helped to reshape the project and launch the Global Youth Action Network. GYAN opened its New York Headquarters in January 2000, under the fiscal sponsorship of the One Day Foundation and Youth In Action, then incorporated the following year.

== See also ==
- Youth Activism
- United Network of Young Peacebuilders (UNOY Peacebuilders)
- TakingITGlobal
- Peace Child International
- Higher Ground for Humanity
- Youth council
- Youth movement
- Youth participation
- Youth voice
- National Youth Service Day
