= Swisspeace =

Practice and research institute in Basel, Switzerland

swisspeace
- Type: Non-governmental organization
- Headquarters: Basel, Switzerland
- Key people: Jakob Kellenberger (President) Prof. Laurent Goetschel (Director)
- Affiliations: University of Basel; Swiss Academies of Arts and Sciences
- Staff: 60
- Formerly called: Swiss Peace Foundation

The Swiss Peace Foundation, operating as Swisspeace (stylized in all lowercase), is a practice and research institute located in Basel, Switzerland promoting effective peacebuilding. Partnerships with local and international actors form the basis of its work. Together with its partner organizations, Swisspeace manages strategies and interventions to reduce violence and promote peace in conflict-affected contexts.

== History ==
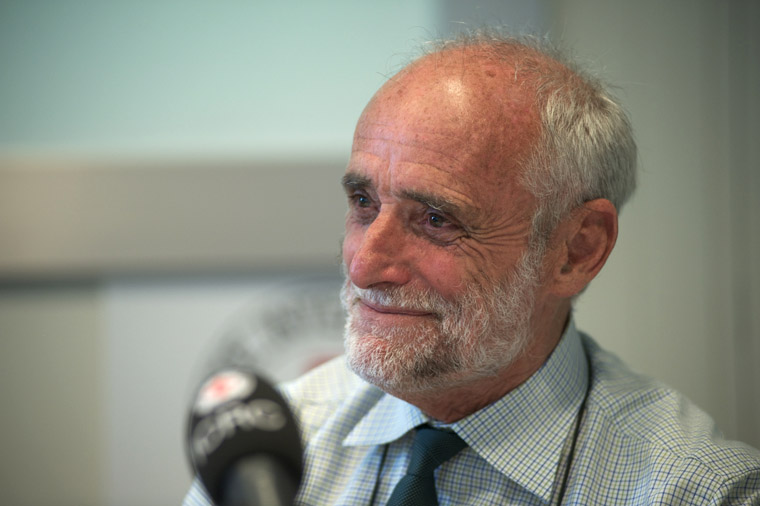
Swisspeace President Jakob Kellenberger during an ICRC press conference in Geneva in 2010

Swisspeace was founded in 1988 as the Swiss Peace Foundation with the goal of strengthening independent peace research in Switzerland. Today Swisspeace employs approximately seventy people and is headquartered in Basel, Switzerland. Swisspeace is a member of the Swiss Academy of Humanities and Social Sciences (SAHS) and is an associated Institute of the University of Basel. Jakob Kellenberger, former president of the International Committee of the Red Cross (ICRC), became president of Swisspeace on the organization’s 25th anniversary on 10 September 2013. Professor Laurent Goetschel is the current Director of Swisspeace.

== Donors and clients ==
The most important donors and clients are the Swiss Federal Department of Foreign Affairs (FDFA), the Swiss National Science Foundation (SNSF), State Secretariat for Education, Research and Innovation (SERI) as well as national and international organizations, foundations and think tanks.

== Fields of expertise ==
Swisspeace operates through several thematic programs, offering support and guidance to local and international actors involved in peacebuilding. Swisspeace focuses on the following subjects:

=== Analysis and Impact ===
Swisspeace serves as a hub for methodological innovation focused on advancing conflict sensitivity and adaptive management in research, policy, and institutional practice. Through a blend of research and practical insights, the Foundation develops approaches to improve analysis, management and learning processes. These efforts aim to support partners and clients in their peacebuilding and development work in fragile and conflict-affected contexts.

=== Mediation ===
Third parties can play an important role in establishing dialogue between warring parties. Swisspeace provides support for ongoing peace mediation and dialogue processes. It provides guidance to mediators and conflict parties and facilitates inclusive formats such as consultations with civil society actors. Swisspeace experts also offer dialogue and mediation training, develop knowledge products based on critical reflection and lessons learned from peace mediation, negotiation and dialogue processes, and conduct research to inform academic debates and the practice of peace mediation.

=== Dealing with the Past ===
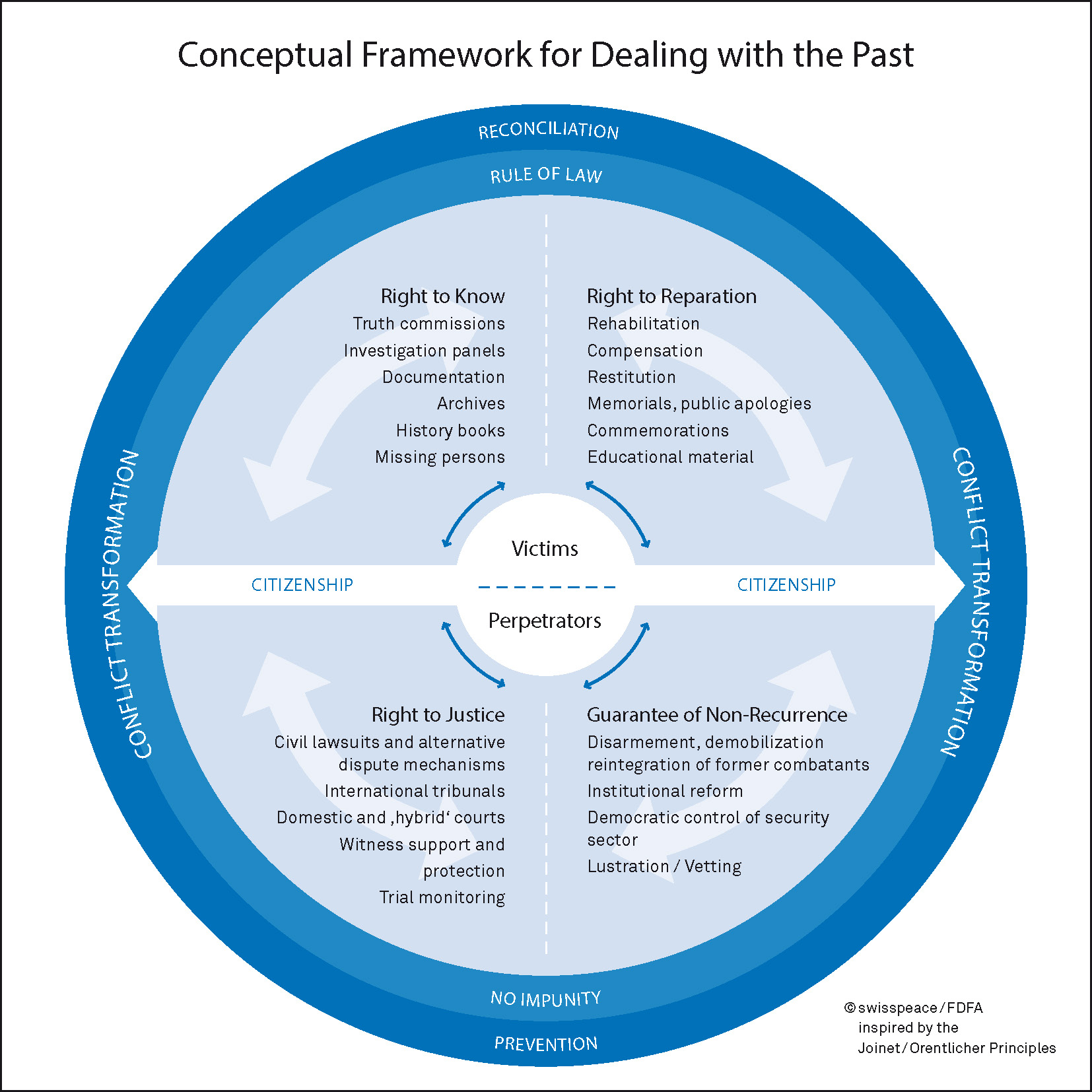
Figure 1: Conceptual framework of Swisspeace's Dealing with the Past (DwP) program

Violent conflicts, dictatorships and repressive regimes often have a lasting impact on societies. Dealing with the legacy of human rights violations and other crimes, also called transitional justice has thus become a central topic for swisspeace. The Foundation seeks to pursue a holistic approach that was jointly developed with the Swiss Federal Department of Foreign Affairs (FDFA). This approach has four pillars: the right to know; the right to justice; the right to reparation; and the guarantee of non-recurrence (see Figure 1). The Swisspeace Dealing with the Past program supports governmental and non-governmental institutions in dealing with the aftermath of serious human rights violations and violations of international humanitarian law, with a focus on preventing their recurrence.

=== Climate Change, Natural Resources, Responsible Business Conduct ===
Private companies can play a critical role in conflict-ridden areas. Against this background, Swisspeace offers companies assistance in identifying conflict-related risks of their operations and in adapting their business practices accordingly. swisspeace also focuses on the impact of changing climatic conditions and global, regional and national climate policies on tensions and conflicts over the use of natural resources.

=== Statehood and conflict ===
Whether state institutions can function properly once an armed conflict has ended often depends on the history and the dynamics of the conflict. In this field, the focus of Swisspeace’s activities lies on state-building, democracy and traditional authorities for example in South Sudan.

=== Gender and Peacebuilding ===
Conflicts affect different genders in different ways. Swisspeace analyses different gender roles, the hierarchies established between them, and their implications for conflict prevention and transformation. To take these differences into account, Swisspeace has sought to promote the implementation of the UN Security Council Resolution 1325 on women, peace and security.

=== Postgraduate courses ===
Swisspeace offers postgraduate education programs and courses in the peacebuilding field. As associated Institute of the University of Basel, Swisspeace offers the following continuing education options:

- Short Courses
- Certificates of Advanced Studies (CAS) in "Peacebuilding Essentials", "Peace Mediation & Dialogue", "Dealing with the Past", and "Religion, Peace, and Conflict".
- Diploma of Advanced Studies (DAS) Peace & Conflict (30 ECTS)
- Master of Advanced Studies (MAS) Peace & Conflict (60 ECTS)

== Projects ==
=== Basel Peace Forum ===
In 2016 Swisspeace launched as a new project the Basel Peace Forum. It organizes an annual conference uniting representatives from economics, politics, science and society to think about peace and to further innovation in peacebuilding.

=== KOFF platform ===
In 2001, Swisspeace founded the Center for Peacebuilding (KOFF) to provide a dialogue, exchange and networking platform for Swiss state and non-state actors that are engaged in peacebuilding activities. Today, KOFF is a well-established platform for exchange, dialogue and network composed of around 40 civil society organizations and 2 state organizations engaged in the fields of peace, human rights and development cooperation. Its objective is to contribute to the reinforcement, the visibility and the relevance of Swiss peacebuilding across the spectrum from fragility to peace.
