= Nexus (non-profit) =

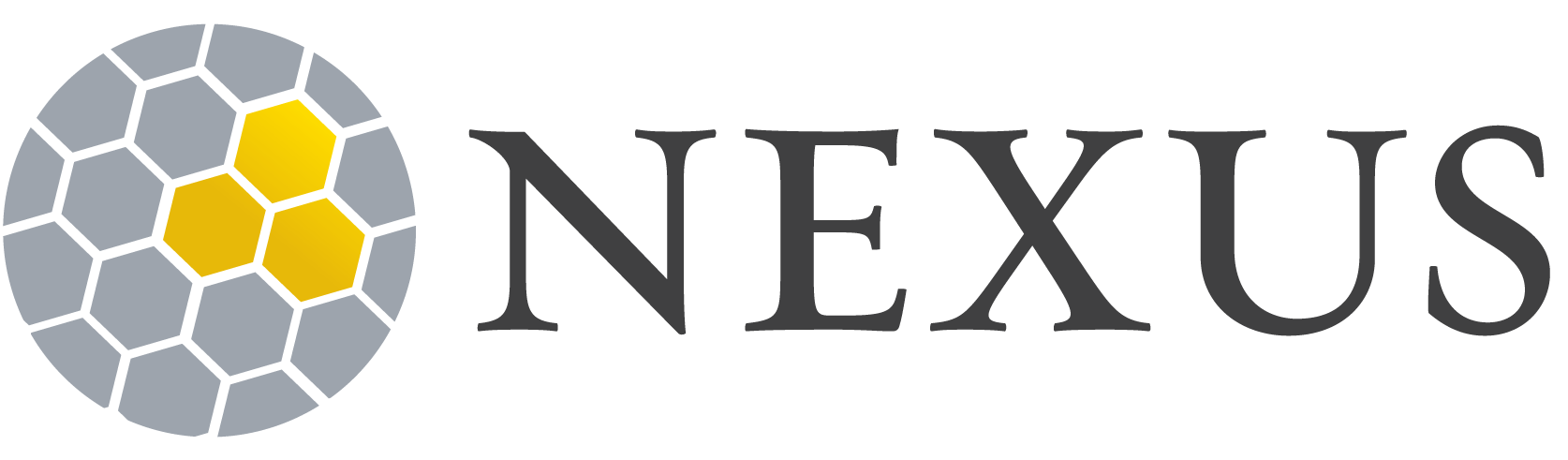
- Formation: 2011; 15 years ago
- Type: International non-profit organization
- Headquarters: Washington, D.C., United States
- Members: About 6000 from 70+ countries
- Key people: Jonah Wittkamper & Rachel Cohen Gerrol
- Staff: 15+
- Website: http://www.nexusglobal.org

Nexus is an international non-profit organization founded in 2011 to bridge communities of wealth and impact. The inaugural Nexus convened at the United Nations and other venues around New York City. Nexus global teams have developed in about 20 countries, hosting regional summits in Europe, Asia, Africa, Australia, and Latin America. In addition to an annual global summit, Nexus hosts salons, government delegations, regional summits, traveling seminars, retreats, research and awareness raising campaigns.

== See also ==
- Philanthropy
- Impact investing
- Youth empowerment
- United Nations
