= Peacebuilding Commission =

United Nations intergovernmental advisory body

United Nations Peacebuilding Commission
- Abbreviation: PBC
- Formation: 20 December 2005 (20 years ago)
- Type: Commission
- Legal status: Active
- Headquarters: United Nations Headquarters
- Chair: Ambassador Sérgio França Danese
- Parent organization: United Nations General Assembly; United Nations Security Council
- Website: PBC Website

The United Nations Peacebuilding Commission (PBC) is a United Nations intergovernmental advisory body of both the General Assembly and the Security Council that supports peace efforts in conflict-affected countries. A key addition to the capacity of the international community in the broad peace agenda, it was established in 2005 with the passage of both A/RES/60/180 and S/RES/1645 Mr. Sérgio França Danese (Brazil) is the incumbent chair of the PBC.

The Peacebuilding Commission has a specific role to play in advancing intergovernmental coherence through its cross-pillar mandate. It has diversified its working methods to enhance its flexibility as a dedicated intergovernmental platform.

Recent good practices of the Peacebuilding Commission include attention to cross-border and regional issues in the Great Lakes region and the Sahel, support to the transition from a peace operation in Liberia and the adoption of a gender strategy that is the first of its kind for an intergovernmental body of the United Nations. Member States have also used the platform of the commission for constructive discussions on Burkina Faso, Colombia, Kyrgyzstan, Papua New Guinea, Solomon Islands, Somalia and Sri Lanka, at the initiative of the countries concerned.

== Members ==
The commission is composed of 31 member states, which gather in two main fora: an Organizational Committee, and country-specific Configurations, one for each country that currently is part of the PBC's agenda.

=== Members ===
As of 2025, the current composition of the Peacebuilding Commission's Organizational Committee is as follows:

Selected by the Security Council	Selected by the General Assembly	Selected by the Economic and Social Council	Selected due to contributions to UN missions	Selected due to contributions to the UN budget	Additional partners
Algeria	Brazil	Australia	Bangladesh	Canada	African Union
China	Cambodia	Colombia	India	Germany	Caribbean Community
France	Egypt	Kenya	Nepal	Japan	EU
Panama	Morocco	Netherlands	Pakistan	Norway	IMF
Russian Federation	Poland	Slovenia	Rwanda	Sweden	OIC
United Kingdom	Uganda	South Africa			World Bank
vacant	Uruguay	South Korea			

=== Former members ===
United States

=== Leadership ===
The leadership of the PBC is currently as follows:

- Chair: Germany
- Vice-Chairs: Morocco, Japan, Poland, and Brazil

== Origins ==
The PBC is one of the new entities created by the reform process initiated during the 60th session of the General Assembly of the United Nations, as part of the 2005 World Summit Outcome. The debate over the reform of the United Nations systems is not a recent one. Since the creation of the organization (June 1945), most delegates and commentators believed that the structure they had given birth to was a merely temporary one as a first step towards the establishment of the new multilateral system. Indeed, the third paragraph of article 109 is a clear clue of this initial orientation, as it states that a General Conference aimed at reviewing the UN Charter should be called from the tenth annual session of the General Assembly onward. But, the first attempt to reform the UN structure failed at the very 10th session, when the General Assembly, even though aware of the need for reform, decided to postpone any decision. Various attempts to reform the UN took place over the decades but the core issues (Security Council reform, veto power, UN enforcement) failed to be properly addressed. The PBC was inaugurated in June 2006, with the inclusion of Burundi and Sierra Leona as the first cases of the commission, as previously requested by the Security Council, to develop a country-specific model aiming to contribute to the implementation of the post-conflict tasks in each of both countries.

=== High-level Panel on Threats, Challenges and Change ===
The new environment and challenges brought by the post–September 11 system of international relations spurred the Secretary-General Kofi Annan to seek new proposals and solutions to reform a certain sensitive area of the UN system. This approximately was the mandate of the High-Level Threat Panel.

Annan announced the membership of the 16-member Panel in a letter, dated November 3, 2003, addressed to the President of the General Assembly, Julian Robert Hunte (Saint Lucia). Mr Anand Panyarachun, former Prime Minister of Thailand, was appointed to chair the high-level panel on global security threats and reform of the international system.

The Panel was asked to analyse and assess future threats to peace and security and to evaluate existing approaches, instruments and mechanisms, including the organs of the UN system. In this view, the Panel was specifically asked to:

- Examine today's global threats and provide an analysis of future challenges to international peace and security;
- Identify the contribution that collective action can make in addressing these challenges;
- Recommend the changes necessary to ensure effective collective action, including but not limited to a review of the principal organs of the United Nations.

The list above makes clear that the panel was not asked to formulate policies on specific issues. Rather it was asked to make an assessment of current challenges and to recommend proper changes to meet them effectively. The final report of the High-level Panel, named "A More Secure World: Our Shared Responsibility," set out several recommendations to address problems and issues in six main areas of concern on which the multilateral system should concentrate its action now and in the decades ahead:

1. war between States;
2. violence within States (civil wars, gross violations of human rights and genocide);
3. poverty, infectious diseases and environmental degradation;
4. nuclear, radiological, chemical and biological weapons;
5. terrorism; and
6. transnational organized crime.

Considering the second point, the analysis of the panel identified "a key institutional gap: there is no place in the United Nations system explicitly designed to avoid State collapse and the slide to war or to assist countries in their transition from war to peace" (reference: report, paragraph 261). Since the United Nations should be able to act coherently and effectively from preventive action through post-conflict peace-building, the panel recommended establishing a Peacebuilding Commission as a subsidiary body of the Security Council itself. As it is stated in the report, "the core functions of the Peacebuilding Commission should be to identify countries which are under stress and risk sliding towards State collapse; to organize, in partnership with the national Government, proactive assistance in preventing that process from developing further; to assist in the planning for transitions between conflict and post-conflict peacebuilding; and in particular to marshal and sustain the efforts of the international community in post-conflict peacebuilding over whatever period may be necessary". For what concerns more practical and in-depth aspects of this new body, the panel just recommends that the commission should be reasonably small, meet in different configurations in order to consider both general policy issues and country-by-country situations and strategies, involving the main relevant actors in different fields (UN organs such as ECOSOC and representative from UN agencies, International Financial and Economic Institutions, representatives of regional and subregional organizations) and it should be assisted by Peacebuilding Support Office established in the Secretariat.

=== High-Level Threat Panel members ===
The High-Level Panel was integrated by 16 prominent politicians, diplomats and development experts:

- Anand Panyarachun (Thailand), former Prime Minister of Thailand (chair)
- Robert Badinter (France), French Senator and former Minister of Justice
- João Clemente Baena Soares (Brazil), former Secretary-General of the Organization of American States;
- Gro Harlem Brundtland (Norway), former Prime Minister of Norway and former Director-General of the World Health Organization;
- Mary Chinery-Hesse (Ghana), Vice-chairman, National Development Planning Commission of Ghana and former Deputy Director-General, International Labour Organization;
- Gareth Evans (Australia), President of the International Crisis Group and former Australian Minister for Foreign Affairs;
- David Hannay (United Kingdom), former Permanent Representative of the United Kingdom to the United Nations and United Kingdom Special Envoy for Cyprus;
- Enrique V. Iglesias (Uruguay), President of the Inter-American Development Bank;
- Amr Moussa (Egypt), Secretary-General of the Arab League;
- Satish Nambiar (India), former Indian Army lieutenant general and United Nations Protection Force (UNPROFOR) commander;
- Sadako Ogata (Japan), former United Nations High Commissioner for Refugees;
- Yevgeny Primakov (Russia), former Prime Minister of the Russian Federation;
- Qian Qichen (China), former Vice Premier and Foreign Minister of the People's Republic of China;
- Nafis Sadik (Pakistan), former executive director of the United Nations Population Fund;
- Salim Ahmed Salim (United Republic of Tanzania), former Secretary-General of the Organization of African Unity; and
- Brent Scowcroft (United States), former United States Air Force lieutenant general and National Security Advisor.

== Structure and mandate ==
=== Institutional Framework ===
The Peacebuilding Commission is a subsidiary organ of both the General Assembly and the Security Council, thus the legal basis for its institution is to be found in articles 22 and 29 of the UN Charter, devoted respectively to GA and SC subsidiary bodies.

In this regard, the Security Council adopted Resolution 1645 on December 20, 2005, in concurrence with an analogue act approved by the General Assembly, the 60/180 resolution of December 30, 2005. In both texts, the Peacebuilding Commission is described as an intergovernmental advisory body, and among its tasks, there is the duty to submit an annual report to the General Assembly which is supposed to hold an annual session to discuss it.

The main task of the new Peacebuilding Commission is that of taking care of post-conflict actions to be adopted and enforced in countries emerging from conflicts, whose Governments choose to ask for relief from the International Community. It is up to the PBC to collect all available resources and funds directed to support recovery projects in those countries, and to draft long-term strategies in order to guarantee reconstruction, institution-building and sustainable development.

As said, this new body represents an innovation to the UN's traditional approach to conflict situations for the first time, there is a single organ charged with a mission that relies on a complex of capacities and expertise which used to be of many UN subjects' concern, without any substantial coordination set out. For this reason, the commission can benefit from all the UN experience on such matters as conflict prevention, mediation, peacekeeping, respect for human rights, the rule of law, humanitarian assistance, reconstruction and long-term development.

Obviously, as it is an advisory body, its natural role is that of proposing action patterns to be followed by the countries involved in the peace-building operations, and it is not entitled to take effective action. Another important task the PBC is supposed to fulfill is of ensuring actual funding both for early reconstruction activities and for longer-term strategies. This last mission is aimed at fixing the previous general praxis, according to which Countries were often more disposable to engage themselves to offer resources for short-term interventions (mainly devoted to peace-keeping operations) than to keep their promises of supporting peace-building operations once the conflict had been soothed and the hype on it had ceased to affect international public opinion.

=== The Peacebuilding Support Office (PBSO) ===
This Peacebuilding Support Office was envisaged as part of the founding resolutions from the Security Council and General Assembly that established the Peacebuilding Commission in order “to establish, within the Secretariat and from within existing resources, a small peacebuilding support office staffed by qualified experts to assist and support the Peacebuilding Commission and drawing from the best expertise available.”

The PBSO also administers the Peacebuilding Fund and provides support to the Secretary General's efforts regarding the coordination of peacebuilding activities. In September 2014, the Secretary-General appointed Oscar Fernandez-Taranco, from Argentina, as Assistant Secretary-General for Peacebuilding Support.

The PBSO comprises three branches: the Peacebuilding Commission Support Branch, the Policy, Planning and Application Branch and the Financing for Peacebuilding Branch.

== Initial operations ==
In its first year of operations, the Commission focused its attention on Burundi and Sierra Leone.

In Burundi, the PBC and the Government of Burundi agreed on four critical peacebuilding areas to form the basis of a strategic framework: promoting good governance, strengthening the rule of law, reform of the security sector, and ensuring community recovery with a special focus on youth.

In Sierra Leone, the PBC and national partners identified reform of the justice and security sectors, youth employment and empowerment, and capacity-building in governance institutions as key priorities. Effective partnerships between national and international actors helped ensure that recent elections in Sierra Leone were conducted in a peaceful, orderly and genuinely contested manner.

The 2010 elections in Burundi were more problematic. Allegations of fraud in an earlier local poll marred the June 2010 presidential election, in which incumbent Pierre Nkurunziza was the only candidate after the country's opposition parties pulled out of the campaign.

According to the constituting resolutions of the PBC, the further inclusion of a situation in the PBC agenda, which is also part of the Security Council's agenda, would need formal action by the members of the council. In this regard, the council has adopted the practice of issuing a letter to the president of the PBSO to request the consideration of other countries as part of the PBC agenda. Once a country's situation has been put under the consideration of the PBC, it should remain as part of the agenda for several years, or until the peacebuilding phase is considered to be completed. Currently, the agenda of the PBC includes the situation in Burundi, Sierra Leone, Guinea, Guinea-Bissau, Liberia and the Central African Republic. The six cases in the agenda of the PBC and the overall progress achieved since the establishment of the Commission reveal the complexity in relying on peacebuilding efforts, as well as the coexistence of several factors within this process, including the ability of the PBC and its different Configurations to engage with the host government, as well as civil society and important stakeholders on the ground, in the conduction and implementation of coordinated actions. Besides, there are several factors largely dependent on the Security Council's substantive engagement in each situation, including the need for regular interactions with the PBC and its Configurations.

== Expanding role in the United Nations ==
=== PGA High-level dialogue on sustainable development and sustaining peace in 2017 ===
In January 2017, the President of the General Assembly convened a high-level dialogue on sustainable development and sustaining peace, which brought together the President of the General Assembly, the President of the Security Council, the President of the Economic and Social Council and the Chair of the Peacebuilding Commission for the first time to promote coordination and coherence across peace and development efforts. The Human Rights Council also considered the links between peacebuilding and human rights at its thirty-fourth session. Such initiatives have built upon the regular exchanges held by the Peacebuilding Commission with the Economic and Social Council and the Security Council.

=== PGA high-level meeting on peacebuilding and sustaining peace in 2018 ===
The President of the General Assembly will convene the High-Level Meeting on Peacebuilding and Sustaining Peace on 24 and 25 April 2018.

Briefing on the high-level event to the Peacebuilding Commission, the President of the General Assembly stressed that "Again and again, we have reaffirmed the role of the PBC as one of the UN’s most valuable tools for Sustaining Peace. This was clear, during the review of the Peacebuilding Architecture, in 2015. It was clear, through the adoption of the twin resolutions on Sustaining Peace, a year later. And, it is clear, again, from the recent report of the Secretary-General."

== Analysis ==
In 2010, the Pulitzer Center on Crisis Reporting and the Stanley Foundation sent an independent journalist to visit the PBC's four agenda countries. The journalistic investigation suggested that the PBC's greatest strength was in its creation and execution of a political mandate for its work. Among its weaknesses were in its open-ended funding mechanism.

== See also ==
- United Nations Secretary-General's Peacebuilding Fund
- United Nations Peacebuilding Support Office
