= United Nations Peacebuilding Fund =

Peacebuilding trust fund

The United Nations Peacebuilding Fund (PBF) is a multi-year standing trust fund for post-conflict peacebuilding, established in 2006 by the UN Secretary General at the request of the UN General Assembly with an initial funding target of $250 million.

The fund was established out of the recognition that among the impediments to successful peacebuilding is the scarcity of resources, most notably financial resources. The fund aims, therefore, to extend critical support during the early stages of a peace process. Its design embodies several key principles:

- Recognition of national ownership of peace processes
- The need to serve as a 'catalyst' to kick-start critical peacebuilding inventions
- To utilize United Nations Agencies, funds and programmes as recipients to support project implementation by national entities
- To operate as a disbursement process at the country level

Since its establishment in October 2006, the Peacebuilding Fund facility has been activated for the two countries currently under consideration by the Peacebuilding Commission, Burundi and Sierra Leone. The secretary-general allocated US$35 million each for these two countries earlier this year.

== Burundi ==
To date, the Peacebuilding Fund has approved 12 projects with a total budget of US$26,883,000 in the four priority areas set out in the United Nations-Burundi Government Peacebuilding Fund priority plan namely; governance, the security sector, justice and human rights, and land issues.

== Sierra Leone ==
At present, the Peacebuilding Fund has approved 7 projects with a total budget of US$15,982,577 in the priority areas of good governance, security and justice sector reform, youth employment and empowerment, and capacity-building.

== Côte d'Ivoire ==
The fund approved emergency funding of US$700,000 to support the ongoing "Direct Dialogue" between President Laurent Gbagbo and the former armed opposition, the Forces Nouvelles de Côte d'Ivoire, in Ouagadougou, Burkina Faso. The funds will help build confidence between ex-belligerents of the Ivorian conflict and contribute to the implementation of the Ouagadougou Political Agreement, leading to the organization of free and fair elections.

== Central African Republic ==
The fund approved emergency funding of US$801,975 to support political dialogue, including a period of mediation by international facilitators, between the government, civil society members, opposition political parties and armed opposition groups.

== Governance arrangements ==
The general assembly guides the operations of the fund and may offer overall policy guidance. The Peacebuilding Commission supports the development of integrated strategies for post-conflict peacebuilding and recovery and provides strategic advice in relation to countries under its review. The Peacebuilding Support Office (PBSO) provides overall direction and guidance on programme management and monitoring.

== Fund administration ==
The Multi-Donor Trust Fund (MDTF) Office of the United Nations Development Programme (UNDP) serves as the administrative agent and is responsible for fund management, including the receipt of donor contributions, the disbursement of funds, and the submission of consolidated narrative and financial reports.

== The advisory group ==
An independent advisory group has been appointed by the secretary-general to provide advice and oversight of the speed and appropriateness of fund allocations and to examine performance and financial reports. In March 2007, the secretary-general announced the composition of the advisory group: 10 eminent persons, from all regions, with significant peacebuilding experience. The advisory group met for the first time on 6 September 2007.
