= Institute for Conflict Transformation and Peacebuilding =

The Institute for Conflict Transformation and Peacebuilding (ICP) is a Swiss non-governmental organization specialized in the promotion of non-violent conflict transformation. Created by Pascal Gemperli and Uri Ziegele in 2007, the organization focuses on promoting conflict transformation and peacebuilding through peace mediation courses and trainings. Its comprehensive approach is based on interdisciplinary practice and research in the areas of international peace and conflict research, critical systems theory, culture and communication studies, political psychology, group psychotherapy and other related fields. The ICP has offices in both Bern and Morges (Switzerland). It is accredited ECOSOC and certified EDUQUA. It is active in the following countries: Switzerland, Serbia, Bosnia and Herzegovina, Croatia, Morocco, Azerbaijan and Armenia.

== Activities ==
The ICP offers mediation services on the one hand, and organizes peace mediation trainings and workshops on the other hand. Hence it is active both in mediation and in the promotion of peacebuilding through education, in Switzerland and abroad.

The ICP holds a Konfliktbüro (conflict office) in Bern. The office proposes mediation services to enterprises, institutions and administrations as well as to individuals. The advanced training Die Kunst der Konfliktbearbeitung (The Art of Conflict Transformation) is recognized by the Swiss Federation for Mediation Associations (SDM-FSM) and organized in partnership with the University of Basel.

Every summer since 2008, the ICP organizes the International Summer Academy and Forum on Peace Mediation and National Dialogue, which is a mediation and peacebuilding training taking place in Caux (Montreux, Switzerland). This one-week course allows participants to attend classes about peace mediation and to take advantage of the skills and knowledge of international experts in the field. Participants also acquire practical skills through peace mediation simulations. Each year, the focus of the course changes slightly: new topics are introduced and other perspectives presented. Participants in the Summer Academy can also decide to attend the International Peace-builders' Forum, which takes place in Caux, usually just before the beginning of the Summer Academy.

The Institute for Conflict Transformation and Peacebuilding is jointly involved with the Universities of Basel, Belgrade, Sarajevo and Zagreb in the creation of a regional Master in Peace Studies in South-East Europe
