= Phil Borges =

American photographer

Phil Borges (born 1942) is an American documentary photographer and filmmaker, recognized for his documentation of indigenous peoples and tribal cultures, with a particular focus on Tibet, human rights, and women's empowerment issues.

== Career ==
Borges has focused on capturing the stories of indigenous and tribal communities. His exhibitions and documentaries have shed light on cultural preservation, the effects of modernization, and the intricate relationship between mental health and cultural practices.

Borges established an online educational program to enhance global citizenship and understanding among youth. He also co-founded "Blue Earth Alliance", a 501(c)(3) nonprofit that sponsors photographic projects focusing on endangered cultures and threatened environments.

== Notable works ==
Books:

- Enduring Spirit
- Tibetan Portrait
- The Gift
- Women Empowered (Inspiring Change in the Emerging World)

Collections:

- Spirit of Place
