= TakingITGlobal =

Non-governmental organization

TakingITGlobal, which is also known as TIG, is a charitable non-governmental organization focusing on global issues by promoting awareness and engagement among global youth. It was founded in 1999 in Toronto, Ontario, Canada, by Jennifer Corriero and Michael Furdyk, who are the Executive Director and Director of Technology respectively. TIG uses an online social network aimed primarily at youth to raise awareness and discussion on a number of global issues and encourages youth to take action that affects their local and global communities.

== History ==
When founding the organization in 1999, co-founders Corriero and Furdyk wanted to "work together to create a global network for young people who either have an idea that they want to develop, or who want the opportunity to work on someone else's project." This was the foundation for one of the world's first online social communities. Within a year of its official launch on September 2, 2000, (predating services such as Facebook, MySpace and Friendster), the network was populated by thousands of teenagers from over 100 countries. As the services and programs of TakingITGlobal evolved, Corriero now calls TakingITGlobal "a platform to support collaboration among young people in developing projects, in understanding and grappling issues, and influencing the decision-making processes, especially around those that are directly affecting young people." TakingITGlobal merged with the Global Youth Action Network and developed various programs to strengthen youth participation in global decision-making, such as forums of the United Nations.

== Programs ==
One of TIG's main offerings is its Online Community, which "guides users to a deeper awareness of social, economic, and environmental issues." It "builds a bridge between learning and action" thus "fostering mutual understanding across continents and languages." There are a number of tools that users can use, from managing projects, participating in discussion boards, signing petitions and writing blogs.

== Awards and recognition ==
TakingITGlobal is notable for receiving a number of awards for its work with global youth. At the 2005 Canadian Awards for International Cooperation, TIG received the Mark Drake Award for Excellence in Communicating the Private Sector's Contribution to International Cooperation Issues. In 2007, TIG received the Microsoft Education Award as a Laureate of the 2007 Tech Museum Awards. TIG was also recognized as one of the World's Most Democratic Workplaces by WorldBlu, having received the honor two years in a row in 2007 and 2008. TakingITGlobal's founders have also won a number of awards on a personal level for their work with TIG. Correiro has won the 2008 Social Entrepreneur of the Year (Impact Conference), and has been listed as one of Canada's 100 Most Powerful Women in 2007 by Women's Executive Network in the 2007 Future Leader Category.

== Membership ==
Membership is free, and is done in keeping with the organization’s privacy policies, to aid freedom of expression, information and online security of its members. The minimum age of membership is 13 years, though teachers or parents are also allowed to gain membership on behalf of a minor.

== Criticism ==
TIG came under criticism in 2008, when Mathew Trevisan of the Canadian newspaper The Globe and Mail commented on TIG’s size, and observed that TIG might be “too big to be effective.” Apart from this, TIG was also seen by some others as one that only serves the interests of developing nations and in need of a wider appeal to attract a more global membership. Another concern was the need to initiate selective sponsorship onto its website, in order to fund its increasing impact, and its need to incorporate a more exclusive approach to its membership, without being seen as a "sell-out."

== See also ==
- One World Youth Project
