= Nonkilling =

Approach to nonviolence

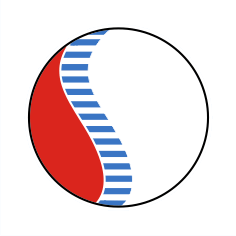
This logo, created by Glenn D. Paige, explains the concept of nonkilling combining the ancient Asian yin-yang symbol with the recent brain research finding that stimulation of the pathways between systems of the brain controlling emotions and movement can assist change from violent to nonviolent human behavior. Analogously Creative Transformational Initiatives (blue), drawing upon Nonkilling Human Capabilities (white), can bring an end to Human Killing (red).

Nonkilling refers to the absence of killing, threats to kill, and conditions conducive to killing in human society. It traces its origin from the broader concept of ahimsa or nonviolence, one of the central tenets of Indian religions, namely, Jainism, Hinduism, and Buddhism, where it includes all sentient life forms. This is also the case for the traditional use of the term "nonkilling" (or "non-killing") as part of Buddhist ethics, as expressed in the first precept of the Pancasila, and in similar terms throughout world spiritual traditions (see Nonkilling studies). While it is typically extended to include the killing of animals and other forms of life, the use of the term in political and academic contexts refers mostly to the killing of human beings. The term was popularised as a modern political concept in the 2002 book Nonkilling Global Political Science by Glenn D. Paige.

== Origins ==
The origin of the concept of non-killing can be traced back to ancient Indian philosophy. The concept arises from the broader concept of nonviolence or ahimsa, which is one of the cardinal virtues and an important tenet of Jainism, Hinduism and Buddhism. It is a multidimensional concept, inspired by the premise that all living beings have the spark of the divine spiritual energy; therefore, to hurt another being is to hurt oneself. It has also been related to the notion that any violence has karmic consequences. While ancient scholars of Hinduism pioneered and over time perfected the principles of ahimsa, the concept reached an extraordinary status in the ethical philosophy of Jainism.

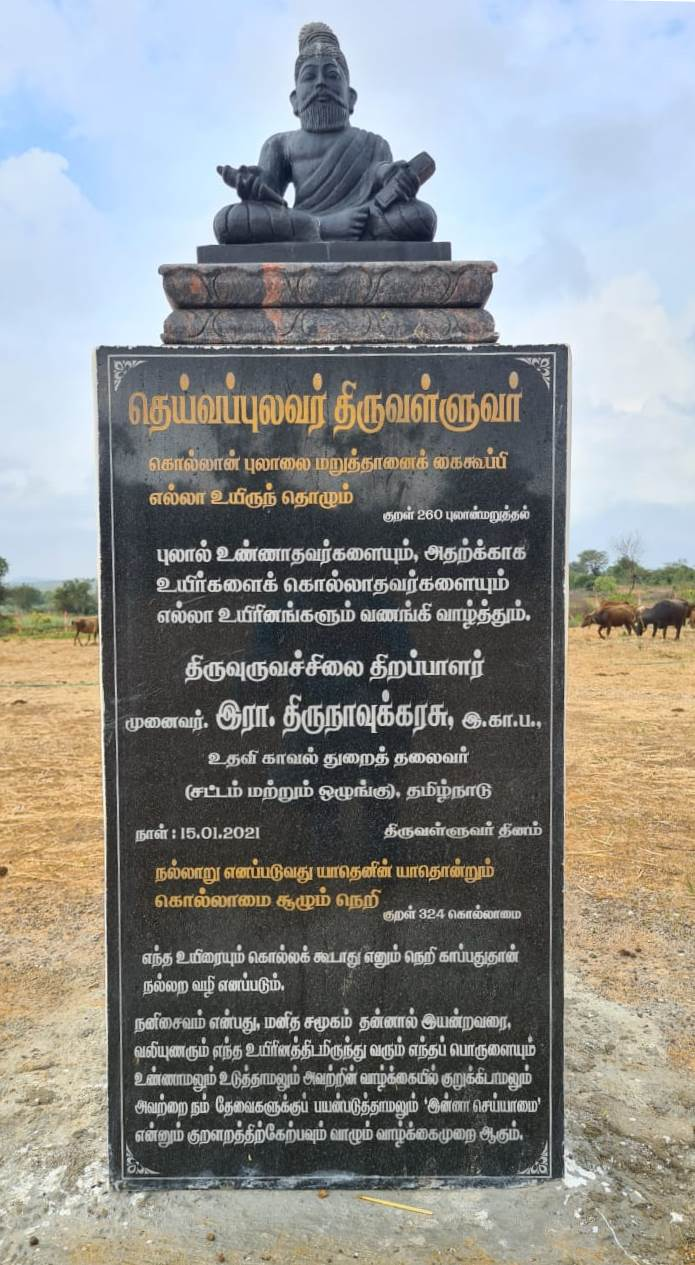
Statue of Valluvar at an animal sanctuary in Tiruvallur. The plaque describes the Kural's teachings on ahimsa and non-killing, summing them up with the definition of veganism.

Historically, several early Indian and Greek philosophers advocated for and preached ahimsa and non-killing. Parsvanatha, the twenty-third tirthankara of Jainism, was one of the earliest individuals to preach the concept of ahimsa and non-killing around the 8th century BCE. Mahavira, the twenty-fourth and last tirthankara, then further strengthened the idea in the 6th century BCE. The earliest Greek philosophers who advocated for ahimsa and non-killing is Pythagoras. The Indian philosopher Valluvar has written exclusive chapters on ahimsa and non-killing as fundamental virtues for an individual in his work of the Tirukkural.

== Terms ==
In analysis of its causes, nonkilling encompasses the concepts of peace (absence of war and conditions conducive to war), nonviolence (psychological, physical, and structural), and ahimsa (noninjury in thought, word and deed). Not excluding any of the latter, nonkilling provides a distinct approach characterized by the measurability of its goals and the open-ended nature of its realization. While the usage of terms such as "nonviolence" and "peace" often follow the classical form of argument through abstract ideas leading to passivity, killing (and its opposite, nonkilling), it can be quantified and related to specific causes, for example by following a public health perspective (prevention, intervention and post-traumatic transformation toward the progressive eradication of killing), as in the World Report on Public Health.

In relation to psychological aggression, physical assault, and torture intended to terrorize by manifest or latent threat to life, nonkilling implies removal of their psychosocial causes. In relation to killing of humans by socioeconomic structural conditions that are the product of direct lethal reinforcement as well as the result of diversion of resources for purposes of killing, nonkilling implies removal of lethality-linked deprivations. In relation to threats to the viability of the biosphere, nonkilling implies absence of direct attacks upon life-sustaining resources as well as cessation of indirect degradation associated with lethality. In relation to forms of accidental killing, nonkilling implies creation of social and technological conditions conducive to their elimination.

== Approach ==
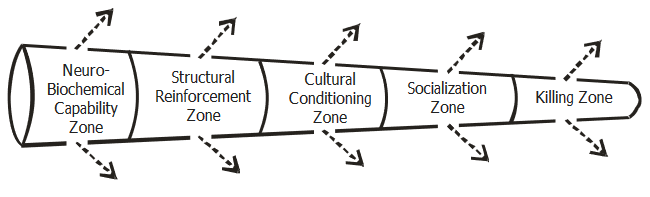
Unfolding Fan of Nonkilling

Paige's nonkilling approach has strongly influenced the discourse of nonviolence. Paige's position is that if we are able to imagine a global society that enjoys an absence of killing, we would be able to diminish and even reverse the present harmful effects of killing and utilize the resulting public funding saved from manufacturing and employing weapons to create a more benevolent, richer and more socially just world.

Nonkilling does not set any predetermined path for the achievement of a killing-free society in the same way as some ideologies and spiritual traditions that foster the restraint from the taking of life do. As an open-ended approach, it appeals to infinite human creativity and variability, encouraging continuous explorations in the fields of education, research, social action and policy making, by developing a broad range of scientific, institutional, educational, political, economic and spiritual alternatives to human killing. Also, in spite of its specific focus, nonkilling also tackles broader social issues.

A considerable literature on nonkilling describes various theoretical and conceptual approaches to nonkilling and codifies a set of potentially useful conceptual lenses. Nonkilling Global Political Science (NKGPS) advocates a threefold paradigmatic shift in human society to the absence of killing, of threats to kill, and of conditions conducive to killing. Since Paige introduced his framework, a body of associated scholarship, guided by his Center for Global Nonkilling, a Honolulu-based NGO with Special Consultative Status with the United Nations Economic and Social Council, has developed across a variety of disciplines. Through academic work sponsored by the center, it has both associated NKGPS with previous nonviolent or peace-building scholarship from different religious frameworks, including Buddhism, Christianity, Hinduism, and Islam. and expanded on these traditions, providing it a broad functional and moral inheritance. Within the NKGPS approach, preventing violence and encouraging peacebuilding involves applying NKGPS as a global political science through advocacy work in favour of a paradigmatic shift from killing to nonkilling, utilizing various conceptual lenses. Paige's own work focused on the Korean peninsular, but scholars have applied NKGPS to a wide variety of regional and national conflicts, for example the Balkans and the Philippines.

Various theoretical elaborations on nonkilling exist. For instance, Motlagh introduced a fundamental objective hierarchy of steps to transform the social institutions that can contribute to nonkilling. Motlagh emphasizes that societal transformation towards nonkilling needs social institutions to adopt inspiring symbols of perpetual peace and concepts such as weapon-free zones, as well as actions like eliminating economic structures that support lethality, protecting the environment, and defending human rights.

In a broad conception, nonkilling opposes aggression, animal cruelty, animal euthanasia, animal killing and animal slaughter, animal testing, assassination, autogenocide, blood sport, contract killing, corporate manslaughter, culling, cultural genocide, capital punishment, democide, domestic killings, ethnic cleansing, ethnocide, femicide, feticide, fishing, gendercide, genocide, honor killing, hunting, infanticide, linguicide, live food, manslaughter, mass murder, meat eating, murder–suicide, omnicide, policide, politicide, regicide, ritual killings, ritual slaughter, school shootings, structural violence, suicide, terrorism, thrill killing, tyrannicide, ventilation shutdown, violence, vivisection, war, and other forms of killing, direct, indirect or structural.

== See also ==
- Animal rights
- Civil resistance
- Nonviolence
- Nonviolent resistance
- Satyagraha – Form of nonviolent resistance
- Veganism
- Vegetarianism
- World peace
