= Nonkilling Global Political Science =

Book by Glenn D. Paige

- First edition
- Author: Glenn D. Paige (1929–2017)
- Language: English
- Subject: Nonkilling
- Publisher: Xlibris, Center for Global Nonkilling
- Publication date: 2002
- Publication place: United States
- Pages: 267
- ISBN: 0-7388-5745-9
- OCLC: 45093643

Nonkilling Global Political Science is a 2002 book written by political scientist Glenn D. Paige. In his book, Paige challenges the violence-accepting assumptions of the discipline of political science as a whole. Paige introduces the concept of nonkilling, which refers to the absence of killing, threats to kill, and conditions conducive to killing in human society.

The book has been translated into over two dozen languages and had led to convening the First Global Nonkilling Leadership Forum in Honolulu, Hawai‘i, 1–4 November 2007. The book spurred the creation of the Center for Global Nonkilling, a United Nations special consultative status nongovernmental organization, and has subsequently led to a body of scholarship, including dedicated issues in peace and conflict study journals.

== See also ==
- Nonviolence
- World peace
