= Anoop Swarup =

Academic (b. 1959)

- Born: 10 January 1959 (age 67)

Anoop Swarup (born 10 January 1959) is the Founding Vice Chancellor Jagran Lakecity University and Chairman Center for Global Nonkilling, Hawaii; having been Vice Chancellor Shobhit University; United Nations Representative with the UNSC; Founder Chairman Global Knowledge Alliance, GEO Reviewer with the IPCCUNEP; as an officer of Indian Revenue Service and Commissioner at the Government of India. He has authored many books notably Regional Economics Engagement and the Free Trade Agreements - Analytical Insights and Policy Options (2010) and The World of Money Laundering Financial Crimes and Commercial Frauds (2006). He has been a visitor with Monash University, a speaker and resource person with Universities and Think Tanks in India and abroad.

== Career and contributions ==
Swarup has been a Fulbright Visitor to the United States in 2004 and is an expert on Strategic Studies, Finance, Management and Environment. He holds a Doctorate in Science, distinguished University Medals for first position in Master of Science and Master of Philosophy as also a Master of Science in DSSC Wellington, University of Madras and an MBA (Finance & Strategy) from the AGSE, Swinburne University. A National Science Talent Scholar (1975), Junior Research Fellow, Council of Scientific and Industrial Research (1980) and University Grants Commission Senior Fellow (1981). He has been a patron of Melbourne School of Knowledge Management and co-founder of Himsa Mukt Bharat Andolan (a movement for nonviolence and against all conflicts) and founder of Sambhav Nasha Mukti Abhiyan (a voluntary coalition for a drug-free society and de-addiction campaigns) in the State of Rajasthan. He has held various key positions as a Member of Indian Revenue Service since 1985 such as Commissioner/ Director in the Ministry of Finance, Government of India.

== Awards and achievements ==
Swarup has been an International Hiroshima Peace Awardee of Japan and Presidential Awardee of Republic of India in 2003 for distinguished record of service and received the UNESCAP hon’ble mention for youth empowerment and the voluntary relief efforts during Orissa Super Cyclone in 1999 and Gujarat earthquake in 2001 as the Executive Director of Nehru Yuva Kendra Sangathan. He is a recipient of the National Gandhi Fellowship by Gandhi Smriti and Darshan Samiti, Ministry of Culture in 2000 and AusAID Fellowship to Australia in 2001. He was awarded the Amrita Devi Vishnoi Medal for his contribution to environmental studies in 2013. He is a member of the International Institute of Strategic Studies (IISS) at London since 2008 and Fellow Zoological Society of India in 2013. In July 2020, Swarup was honoured with the prestigious award of "Ambassador For Peace" from the Universal Peace Federation Oceania in recognition for his longstanding service in peace-building and academic leadership.

== Peacekeeping with the UN in Darfur ==
Anoop Swarup was appointed in 2007 by the UN Secretary General Ban Ki Moon as UN Finance Expert for implementation of UN Security Council Resolution in Darfur. As Executive Director of NYKS, the largest youth Organisation of its kind in the world (1996)and the Managing Director of the National Youth Cooperative Bank that he had set up in 1998 he launched several new initiatives and schemes working closely with UNDP, UNESCO and UNICEF.

== Activist and social entrepreneurship in the aftermath of Bhopal gas tragedy ==
Anoop Swarup had set up ‘Sambhavami’ not for profit society at Bhopal in the aftermath of Bhopal Disaster to promote micro enterprises in 1992 and ‘Youth and Biosphere for raising environmental consciousness in 1984. He initiated the UNDP-NYKS Poverty Alleviation Awards in 2000, was instrumental in launching a ‘National Think Tank’ in the Ministry of Finance in 2004 and campaign on ‘Indian Civilization through the Millennium’ (ICTM) in 2008 now an ongoing yearly event at Hastinapur. He founded the ‘Sambhav’ Trust in the Indian State of Rajasthan for de addiction in 2008.

== Other associations ==
Anoop Swarup is associated with various organizations that include Board of Directors of OISCA Organization for Industrial, Spiritual and Cultural Advancement International, Tokyo Japan, United Nations Inter Agency working group on Population and Development as part of United Nations Development Assistance Frame Work (UNDAF), Indian Institute of Public Administration (IIPA), a founder Trustee of Indian Council of Gandhian Studies (ICGS), International Institute for Strategic Studies (IISS) in 2008, on the Global Advisory Board, Human Dignity and Humiliation Studies (DGHS), Orgdyn and the Governing Council, Center for Global Nonkilling.
