= Center for Global Nonkilling =

International non-profit organization

Center for Global Nonkilling (formerly Center for Global Nonviolence)
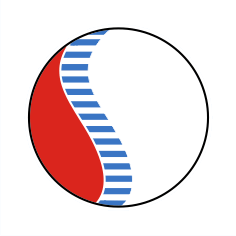
- Founded: 1988; Honolulu, Hawai‘i
- Type: Non-governmental organization
- Purpose: Nonkilling
- Location: Honolulu, Hawai‘i (international)
- Region served: Worldwide
- Method: education, action, advocacy, research, innovation
- Key people: Glenn D. Paige, Founder; Anoop Swarup, Chair; Joám Evans Pim, Director
- Website: nonkilling.org/center/

The Center for Global Nonkilling (originally known as the Center for Global Nonviolence) is an international non-profit organization focused on the promotion of change toward the measurable goal of a killing-free world. The Center for Global Nonkilling is an NGO in Special Consultative Status with the United Nations Economic and Social Council and a participant organization of the World Health Organization's Violence Prevention Alliance.

== History ==
The history of the Center for Global Nonkilling started in 1988 in Honolulu, Hawai‘i, as the "Center for Global Nonviolence Planning Project", an exploratory initiative set up at the Spark M. Matsunaga Institute for Peace and Conflict Resolution, University of Hawaiʻi, by Professor Glenn D. Paige. Its purpose was to be a creative facilitator of research, education-training, and action in the form of problem-solving leadership for nonviolent global transformation. During this phase the Center was responsible for a series of publications and events in partnership with the University of Hawaiʻi.

== Organization ==
The Center is governed by a chairperson, currently Anoop Swarup, together with a governing council. Its everyday business, such as meetings and publications, is executed by a Director, currently Joám Evans Pim. The Center has three UN Representatives: Christophe Barbey (Geneva), Winnie Wang (New York), and Elina Viitasaari (Gender Focal Point). The Center also has special advisers and honorary sponsors, including Máiread Corrigan Maguire, Óscar Arias, Juan Esteban Aristizábal Vásquez, A. T. Ariyaratne, Federico Mayor Zaragoza, Neelakanta Radhakrishnan, and Bernard Lafayette Jr. The Center also maintains a number of research committees.

== See also ==
- Glenn D. Paige
- Nonkilling
- Nonkilling Global Political Science
- World peace
