= Glenn D. Paige =

American political scientist

Glenn Durland Paige
- Born: June 28, 1929; Brockton, Massachusetts, U.S.
- Died: January 22, 2017 (aged 87); Honolulu, Hawaii, U.S.
- Known for: Korean War decision-making, the scientific study of political leadership, and nonkilling

Academic background
- Education: Princeton University; Harvard University; Northwestern University

Glenn Durland Paige (June 28, 1929 – January 22, 2017) was an American political scientist. He was Professor Emeritus of political science at the University of Hawaiʻi and Chair of the Governing Council of the Center for Global Nonkilling. Paige is known for developing the concept of nonkilling, his studies on political leadership, and the study of international politics from the decision-making perspective with a case study of President Harry S. Truman's decision to involve the United States in the Korean War.

== Biography ==
The son of a YMCA social worker, Glenn Durland Paige was born on June 28, 1929, in Brockton, Massachusetts, in the northeastern part of the United States known as New England. He grew up in Rochester, New Hampshire, with summers in Provincetown, Cape Cod, Massachusetts. He served in the U.S. Army (1948–52) as recruit, private, corporal, sergeant, second lieutenant (OCS), first lieutenant and later captain (Army Reserve, 1956–60). A Korean War veteran (1950–52), he served as communications officer at the 10th Anti-Aircraft Artillery Group, attached to the First Republic of Korea Infantry Division, September–December 1950.

He graduated from Phillips Exeter Academy (1947), Princeton University (A.B., Politics, 1955; International Politics; Chinese and Russian languages), Harvard University (A.M., East Asian regional studies, 1957; Korean Studies, Chinese, Japanese and Korean languages) and Northwestern University (PhD political science, 1959; interdisciplinary behavioral science curriculum). After teaching at Seoul National University's Graduate School of Public Administration (1959–61), and Princeton University (1961–67), he taught at the University of Hawaiʻi (1967–92). There he introduced new courses and seminars on political leadership (1967–92) and nonviolent political alternatives (1978–92), besides lecturing introduction to political science and world politics. He helped to found the University of Hawai‘i Center for Korean Studies in 1972, the Spark M. Matsunaga Institute for Peace and its Center for Global Nonviolence Planning Project (later to become the Center for Global Nonkilling).

The journey from soldier to scholar to founder with others of the Center for Global Nonkilling can be told in terms of three discoveries.

The first began with a case study with interviews of how President Harry S Truman and other leaders engaged the United States in the Korean War in which Paige had served during 1950–52. This became a doctoral dissertation published as a book entitled The Korean Decision: June 24–30, 1950 (see also Study of the Korean War Decision-Making)

Subsequent comparative study of divided Korea’s divergent development since 1945 led to discovery of the creative potential of political leadership for social change and a call to make this a special field for research, teaching, and service in the academic discipline of political science. This was published in The Scientific Study of Political Leadership (New York: The Free Press, 1977). This "discovery" of the importance of creative political leadership for global problem-solving contributed to thinking that led to creation of the United Nations University/International Leadership Academy at the University of Jordan in 1995 through the pioneering efforts of Prime Minister Dr. Abdelsalam al-Majali under the leadership of King Hussein who announced its establishment in New York during the UN's 50th Anniversary ceremonies. Glenn D. Paige served as participant-observer and evaluator of the First UNU/ILA Leadership Programme in Jordan, Israel, Palestine, and Egypt in 1997.

The second discovery was of nonkilling as a basic value for political science and life. Glenn D. Paige's awakening to nonkilling occurred during 1973–74 and has led to more than a quarter century of discovery and re-education resulting in the thesis of Nonkilling Global Political Science. This unexpected shift by a conventionally trained, violence-accepting political scientist, whose doctoral dissertation justified war and threat of war in Korea, perhaps can be attributed in part to a process of "cognitive dissonance" in which one's values and perceptions of reality come in conflict. Having participated in and justified a Cold War crusade for freedom and peace in Korea (values) combined with opposition in 1973 by the United States and ROK governments to a University of Hawai‘i initiative to invite North Korean scholars to visit Honolulu for a peaceful cultural exchange (non-peace reality) one day produced a strongly felt value shift expressed in three words of an inner voice, "No more killing!" (see photograph above). Consequently, this value shift led both to heightened perceptions of lethal realities and to search for realistic nonkilling alternatives.

As a result, he produced a critical book review by him of his book on the Korean War, which essentially had been a scientific apologia for war. This was published as "On Values and Science: The Korean Decision Reconsidered" in American Political Science Review. Such an author review was unprecedented in the history of the APSR since 1906.

The third discovery followed projection of the logic of nonviolent critical analysis applied to his own scientific work to critique the violence-accepting assumptions of the discipline of political science as a whole. After 28 years of research, teaching, and travel to discover foundations for a new nonkilling discipline the results were published in 2002 as Nonkilling Global Political Science In 2007 it led to convening the First Global Nonkilling Leadership Forum in Honolulu, Hawai‘i, November 1–4, 2007, and by 2014 the book had been translated into 30 languages.

== Social and scientific contributions ==
=== Nonkilling ===
Nonkilling refers to the absence of killing, threats to kill, and conditions conducive to killing in human society. Even though the use of the term in the academic world refers mostly to the killing of human beings, it is sometimes extended to include the killing of animals and other forms of life. This is also the case for the traditional use of the term "nonkilling" (or "non-killing") as part of Buddhist ethics, as expressed in the first precept of the Pancasila, and in similar terms throughout world spiritual traditions. Significantly, "nonkilling" has also been used recently in the "Charter for a World without Violence" approved by the 8th World Summit of Nobel Peace Laureates.

In analysis of its causes, nonkilling encompasses the concepts of peace (absence of war and conditions conducive to war), nonviolence (psychological, physical, and structural), and ahimsa (noninjury in thought, word and deed). Not excluding any of the latter, nonkilling provides a distinct approach characterized by the measurability of its goals and the open-ended nature of its realization. While the usage of terms such as "nonviolence" and "peace" often follow the classical form of argument through abstract ideas leading to passivity, killing (and its opposite, nonkilling), it can be quantified and related to specific causes by following a clinical perspective (prevention, intervention and post-traumatic transformation toward the progressive eradication of killing). Glenn D. Paige's contributions, namely the volume Nonkilling Global Political Science but also many of his articles dating back from the 80s, significantly developed the usage of this term among the academic world. Currently, the Center for Global Nonkilling hosts a series of Nonkilling Research Committees bringing together over 700 scholars from more than 300 universities.

In 2021 an annual "International Nonkilling Day" was begun on June 28, Dr. Page's birthday. The first global colloquium was virtual, and titled: “Creating an Affirmative Nonkilling World”.

=== The Scientific Study of Political Leadership ===
Paige’s 1977 The Scientific Study of Political Leadership has been considered, jointly with James MacGregor Burns’ 1978 Leadership, a landmark for the foundation and institutionalization of political leadership as discipline, following Harold Lasswell's challenge to study this field as a subject for multidisciplinary research grounded in social science theory. In this essay, Paige presents a conceptual framework through which the study of political leadership, and leadership in general, can be organized and developed following scientific bases. This framework, presented as an "multivariate, multidimensional linkage approach" considers six main factors that impact the behavior of political leaders: personality, role, organization, tasks, values, and setting. At the same time, these factors also generate patterns of behavior that can affect or be affected by 18 societal political dimensions as the extent of conflict, the use of violence, the presence of consensus, and the practice of compromise.

=== Study of the Korean War decision making ===
In his 1968 book The Korean Decision: June 24–30, 1950, Paige provided a significant contribution to the scientific study of international politics by exploring in a first case study the decision-making approach to analysis pioneered by Richard C. Snyder, opening new lines of inquiry. The volume presents a reconstruction of the United States government's decision to intervene in Korea in 1950, through the careful documentation of the seven days of crucial decision-making that led to the country's involvement in the war. Besides reviewing key documentation and examining the circumstances surrounding the intervention from 1945 to 1950, major players in this process, including U.S. President Harry S. Truman, Secretary of State Dean G. Acheson, Secretary of Defense Louis A. Johnson, Secretary of the Air Force Thomas K. Finletter, Secretary of the Army Frank Pace and Assistant Secretary of State for Far Eastern Affairs Dean Rusk, among others, were extensively interviewed.

Beside reconstructing decisions from the point of view of the decision makers, Paige analyzes them in terms of the interaction of organizational, informational, and motivational variables; evaluating and providing guidance for coping with future war-prone crisis situation. With important points in common with the decision-centered conception of the policy sciences laid out by Harold D. Lasswell and Myres S. McDougal, Paige brings forward the importance of decision-making itself. The observational standpoint, conceptions of the decision process, definition of decisional situations, crisis as a special occasion for decision, linkages among variables, and appraisal as a particular decision process function made the work unique, having been used a reference model not only in academia but also among government and the military.

Ten years after the publication of this work, Paige prepared a critical book review of his book on the Korean War, which essentially had been a scientific apologia for war. This was published as “On Values and Science: The Korean Decision Reconsidered” in the American Political Science Review. Such an author review was unprecedented in the history of the APSR since 1906.

== Academic achievements, awards and honors ==
=== Honors and awards ===
- Army Commendation Medal, 1952
- Woodrow Wilson National Fellowship, 1955–56
- Kent Fellow, Society for Religion and Higher Education, 1955–57
- Ford Foundation Foreign Area Training Fellow, 1956–59
- Princeton University John Witherspoon Bicentennial Preceptorship, 1962–65
- Seikyo Culture Price (Japan), 1982
- Ramachandran Award for International Understanding (India), 1986
- Anuvrat Award for International Peace (India), 1987
- Princeton University Class of 1955 Award, 1987
- Third Gandhi Memorial Lecturer (India), 1990
- Distinguished Life Fellow, Delhi School of Nonviolence (India), 1992
- Honorary PhD, Soka University (Japan), 1992
- Magisterium International Council (Russia), 1994
- Jai Tulsi Anuvrat Award (India), 1995
- Orden de Mérito Guillermo Gaviria Correa (Colombia), 2004
- Festschrift in Korean: Pisalsaeng chongch’ihak gwa chigu p’yonghwa undong. Glenn D. Paige kyosu ui hakmun segye [Nonkilling Political Science and the Global Peace Movement. The Scholarly World of Professor Glenn D. Paige] (Seoul: Jipmoondang, 2004)
- Distinguished Career Award, American Political Science Association, 2004
- Lifetime Peacemaker Award, 2005
- Peace Day Hawai‘i Award, 2008
- Distinguished Peace Leadership Award, 2010
- Jamnalal Bajaj International Award for Promoting Gandhian Values Outside India, 2012
- Honorary Doctorate of Humanities from Jagran Lakecity University in Bhopal, India, 2016

=== Visiting appointments ===
- Assistant Professor, Columbia University, 1962.
- Visiting Researcher, Asiatic Research Center, Korea University, Seoul, 1965.
- Senior Specialist, Institute for Advanced Projects, East-West Center, Honolulu, 1964.
- Visiting Researcher, Gandhigram Rural Institute (Deemed University), Madurai District, Tamil Nadu, India, 1976 and 1977.
- Visiting Researcher, Institute for Peace Science, Hiroshima University, Japan, 1978.
- Senior Scholar, Australian-American Educational Commission, Australia, 1980.
- Visiting Scholar, Institute of Oriental Studies, USSR Academy of Sciences, Moscow, 1982.
- Visiting Scholar, Chinese Academy of Social Sciences, Beijing, June 24 – July 6, 1982
- Visiting Scholar, Swedish Association for Adult Education, Stockholm, 1984.
- Research Associate, Peace Research Institute, Soka University, Tokyo, 1985.
- Visiting Scholar, Korean Association of Social Scientists, 1987 and 1990.

=== Professional affiliations ===
- American Political Science Association
- International Political Science Association
- International Peace Research Association
- World Futures Studies Federation

== Select bibliography ==
- Paige GD (2002). Nonkilling global political science (PDF). OCLC 50711626. Archived from the original (PDF) on November 23, 2009.
- ed. by Glenn D. Paige and Joám Evans Pim. (2009). Paige GD; Evans Joám (eds.). Global nonkilling leadership (PDF). Honolulu: University of Hawaii and Center for Global Nonkilling. ISBN 978-1-880309-11-7. Archived from the original (PDF) on July 16, 2011.
- edited by Glenn D. Paige, Chaiwat Satha-Anand (Qader Muheideen), Sarah Gilliatt. (1993). Satha-Anand Chaiwat; Paige GD; Gilliatt Sarah (eds.). Islam and nonviolence (PDF). Honolulu: University of Hawaii. ISBN 978-1-880309-06-3. OCLC 28723586. Archived (PDF) from the original on July 16, 2011. "Report on an international exploratory seminar on Islam and nonviolence, held in Bali, Indonesia, during February 14–19, 1986. Indonesian translation: Islam tanpa Kekerasan, Yogyakarta: LkiS, 1st edition, August 1998; 2nd edition, September 2000. Islam tanpa kekerasan at Google Books"
- Glenn D. Paige. (1993). Paige GD (ed.). To nonviolent political science : from seasons of violence. Honolulu: University of Hawaii. ISBN 978-1-880309-07-0. OCLC 28799961. "Korean translation: 비폭력과 한국정치 [Bipokryeok gwa Hanguk jeongchi, Nonviolence and Korean Politics], Seoul: Jipmoondang, 1999. ISBN 89-303-0706-X"
- Kelly Petra K (1992). Paige GD; Gilliatt Sarah (eds.). Nonviolence speaks to power (PDF). Honolulu: University of Hawaii. ISBN 978-1-880309-05-6. OCLC 26212037. Archived (PDF) from the original on July 16, 2011.
- edited by Glenn D. Paige, Lou Ann Haʹaheo Guanson, George Simson. (1995). Paige GD; Guanson LAH; Simson George (eds.). Hawai'i journeys in nonviolence (PDF). Honolulu: University of Hawaii. ISBN 978-1-880309-10-0. OCLC 32855002. Archived (PDF) from the original on July 16, 2011.
- edited by Glenn D. Paige and Sarah Gilliatt. (1991). Paige GD; Gilliatt Sarah (eds.). Nonviolence in Hawaii's spiritual traditions (PDF). Honolulu: University of Hawaii. ISBN 978-1-880309-00-1. OCLC 24502156. Archived (PDF) from the original on July 16, 2011.
- Paige GD; Gilliatt Sarah, eds. (1991). Buddhism and nonviolent global problem-solving (PDF). Honolulu: University of Hawaii. OCLC 25519413. Archived (PDF) from the original on July 16, 2011.
- Paige GD (1984). Buddhism and leadership for peace. Dae Won Sa Buddhist Temple of Hawaii. OCLC 13164982.
- Paige GD (1977). The scientific study of political leadership. Free Press. ISBN 978-0-02-923630-7.
- Chaplin George; Paige GD (1973). Hawaii 2000: continuing experiment in anticipatory democracy. Honolulu: University Press of Hawaii for the Governor's Conference on the Year 2000. ISBN 978-0-8248-0252-3.
- Paige GD, ed. (1972). Political leadership: readings for an emerging field. Free Press. ISBN 9780029236109. OCLC 354740.
- Paige GD, ed. (1970). 1950, Truman's decision: the United States enters the Korean War. New York. OCLC 267269.
- Paige GD (1968). The Korean decision: June 24–30, 1950. Free Press. ISBN 9780029235904. OCLC 16122772.
- Paige GD (1966). The Korean People's Democratic Republic. Stanford, California: Hoover Institution on War, Revolution and Peace. ISBN 9780817931124. OCLC 413900.

== See also ==
- Center for Global Nonkilling
- Nonkilling Science
- Nonkilling studies
