= Killing of animals =

Act of killing an animal

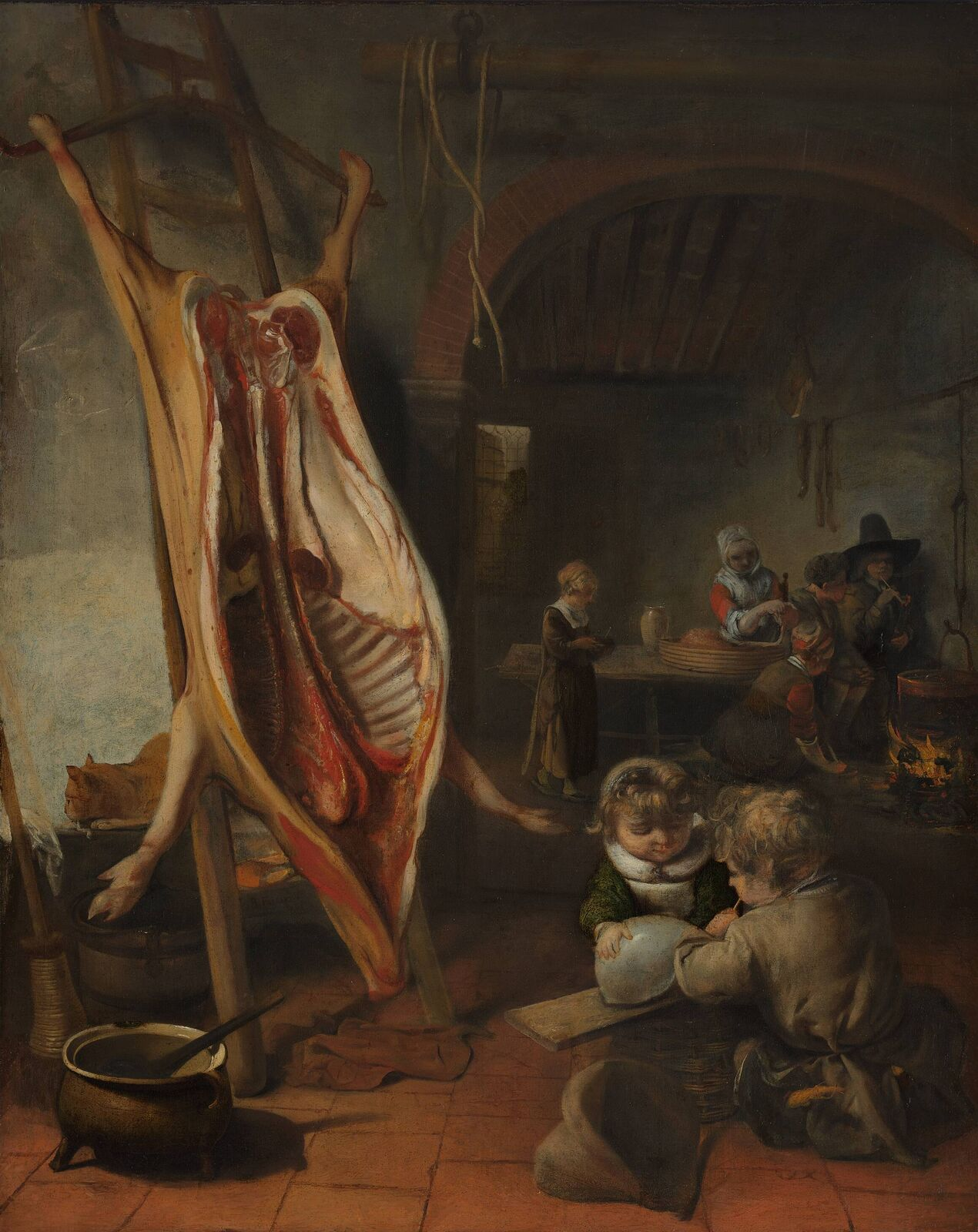
The slaughtered swine (1652) by Barent Fabricius; a depiction of a killed animal

The killing of animals is animal euthanasia (for pain relief), animal sacrifice (for a deity), animal slaughter (for food), hunting (for food, for sport, for fur and other animal products, etc.), blood sports, roadkill (by accident) or self-defense.

== Animal euthanasia ==
Animal euthanasia (euthanasia from Greek: εὐθανασία; "good death") is the act of putting an animal to death or allowing it to die by withholding extreme medical measures. This is often done for domesticated livestock and house pets. It is considered ethically acceptable when performed to prevent prolonged pain or distress, often referred to as "necessary euthanasia." However, euthanasia is also sometimes employed for non-medical reasons, such as shelter overcrowding, lack of adoption, or behavioural issues. These instances raise ethical concerns, as the animal's life may be ended despite the possibility of recovery or rehoming. An increasingly recognised alternative to non-essential euthanasia is temporary fostering which offers short-term home care that helps animals recover from stress, minor health issues, or behavioural problems, increasing their chances of adoption.

== Animal sacrifice ==
=== Hinduism ===
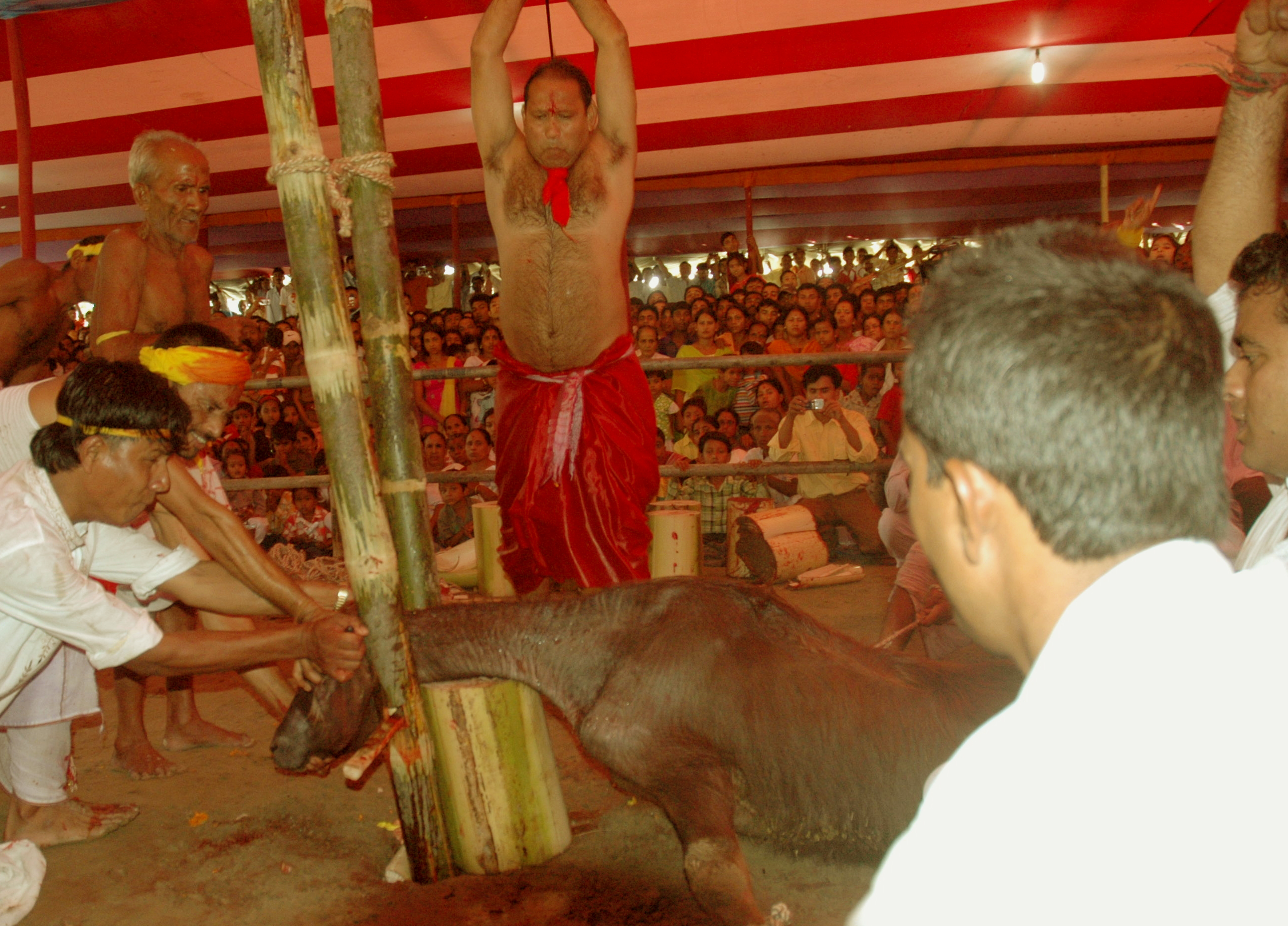
A water buffalo about to be sacrificed by a villager in the Durga Puja festival

In Assam and West Bengal states of India and Nepal some Hindu temples sacrifice goats and chickens. Occasionally water buffalos are also sacrificed. Temples following Shakti school of Hinduism are the ones where sacrifice usually takes place. There are many village temples in Tamil Nadu where this kind of sacrifice takes place. Many animals are sacrificed during the three-day-long Gadhimai festival in Nepal. In 2009 it was speculated that more than 250,000 animals were killed In 2014, 100,000 animals were sacrificed which was a decrease from previous numbers. Animals range from buffalo to rats have been sacrificed. The temple authorities enacted a ban on animal sacrifice in 2015.

=== Indo-European ===
==== Horse sacrifice ====
Many Indo-European religious branches show evidence for horse sacrifice, and comparative mythology suggests that they derive from a Proto-Indo-European (PIE) ritual.

=== Islam ===
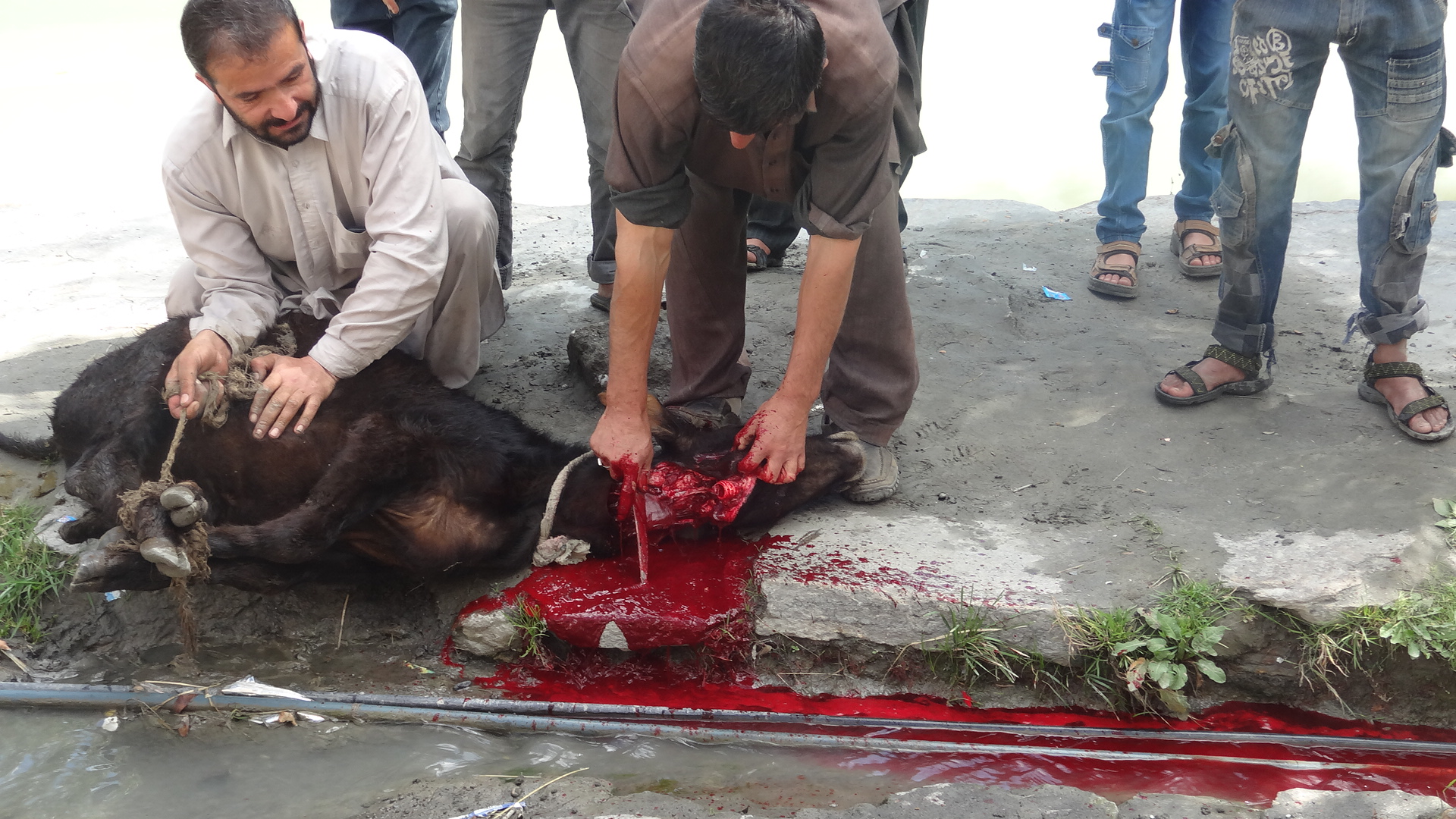
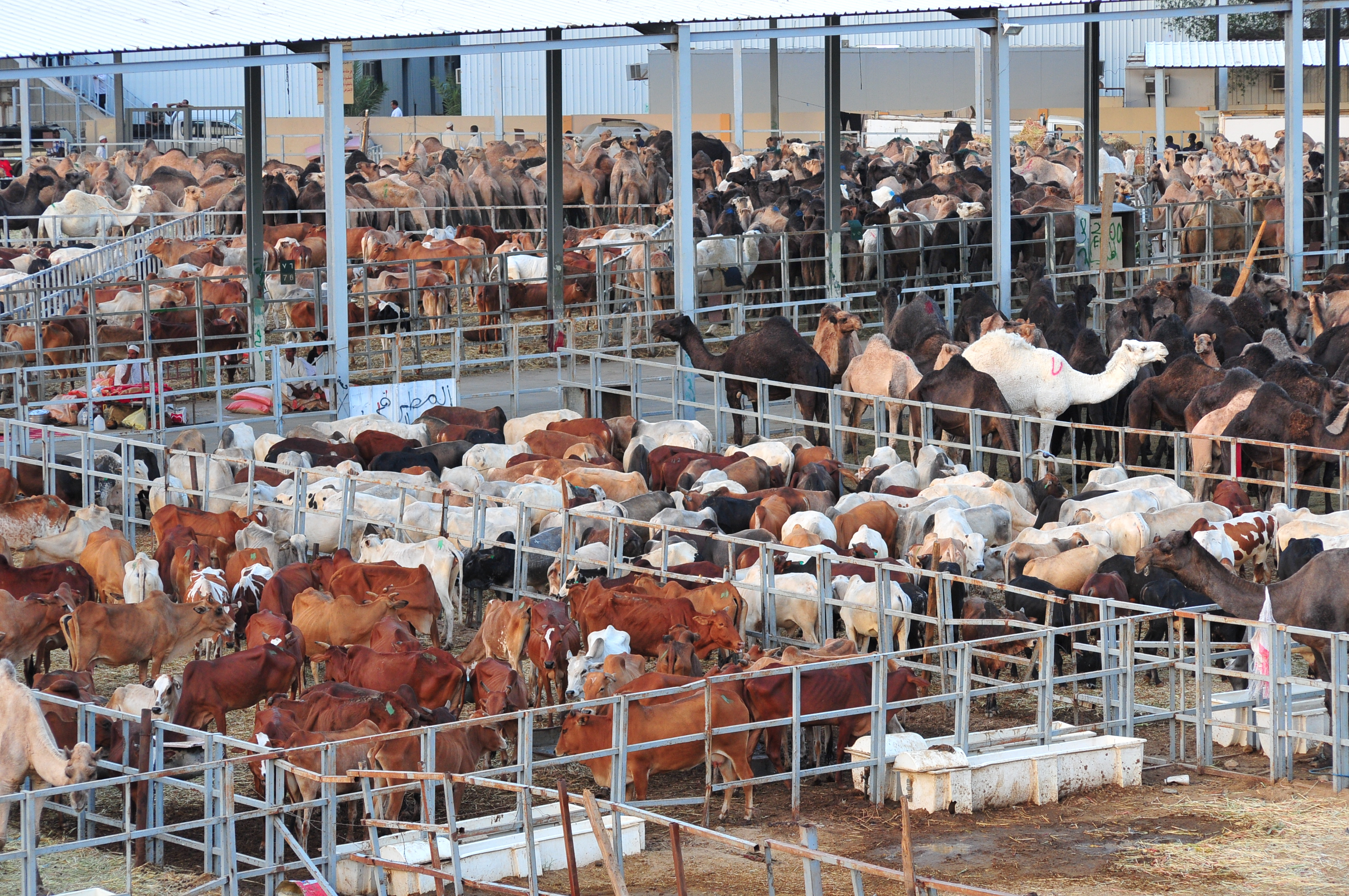
Animal sacrifices at the Eid al-Adha Islamic festival in Pakistan (left). Animals collected for the Hajj sacrifice in Mecca, Saudi Arabia, an obligatory ritual.

Muslims engaged in the Hajj (pilgrimage) are obliged to sacrifice a lamb or a goat or join others in sacrificing a cow or a camel during the celebration of the Eid al-Adha, an Arabic term that means "Feast of Sacrifice", also known as al-Id al-Kabir (Great Feast), or Qurban Bayrami (Sacrifice Feast) in Turkic influenced cultures, Bakar Id (Goat Feast) in Indian subcontinent and Reraya Qurben in Indonesia. Other Muslims not on the Hajj to Mecca also participate in this sacrifice wherever they are, on the 10th day of the 12th lunar month in the Islamic calendar. It is understood as a symbolic re-enactment of Ibrahim's sacrifice of a ram in place of his son. Meat from this occasion is divided into three parts, one part is kept by the sacrificing family for food, the other gifted to friends and family, and the third given to the poor Muslims. The sacrificed animal is a sheep, goat, cow or camel. The animal sacrifice, states Philip Stewart, is not required by the Quran, but is based on interpretations of other Islamic texts.

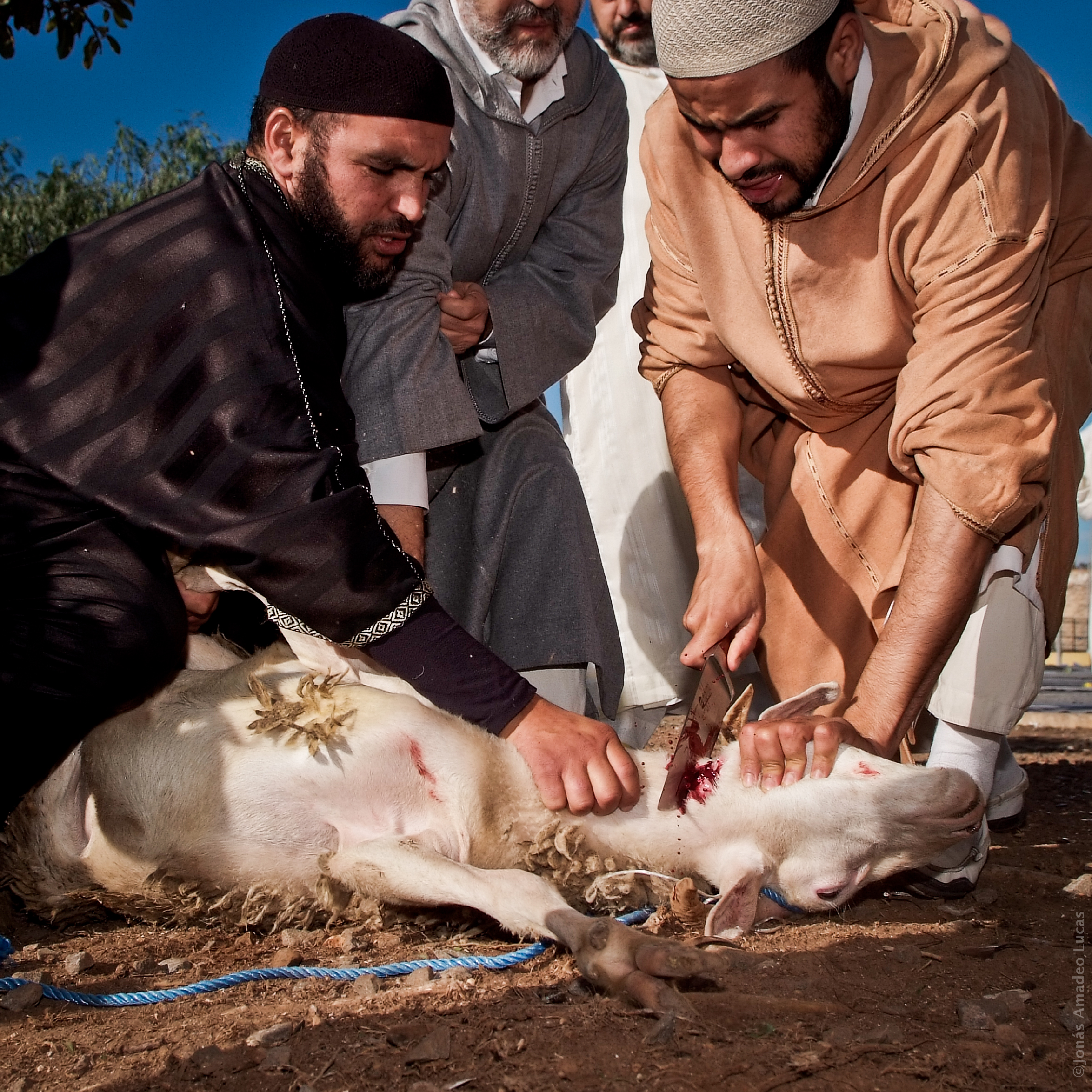
Goat sacrifice.

The Eid al-Adha is major annual festival of animal sacrifice in Islam. In Indonesia alone, for example, some 800,000 animals were sacrificed in 2014 by its Muslims on the festival, but the number can be a bit lower or higher depending on the economic conditions. According to Lesley Hazleton, in Turkey about 2,500,000 sheep, cows and goats are sacrificed each year to observe the Islamic festival of animal sacrifice, with a part of the sacrificed animal given to the needy who didn't sacrifice an animal. According to The Independent, nearly 10,000,000 animals are sacrificed in Pakistan every year on Eid. Millions of animal are brought into the Middle East from north Africa and parts of Asia and slaughter every year on Eid al-Adha.

Other occasions when Muslims perform animal sacrifice include the 'aqiqa, when a child is seven days old, is shaved and given a name. It is believed that the animal sacrifice binds the child to Islam and offers protection to the child from evil.

== Animal slaughter ==
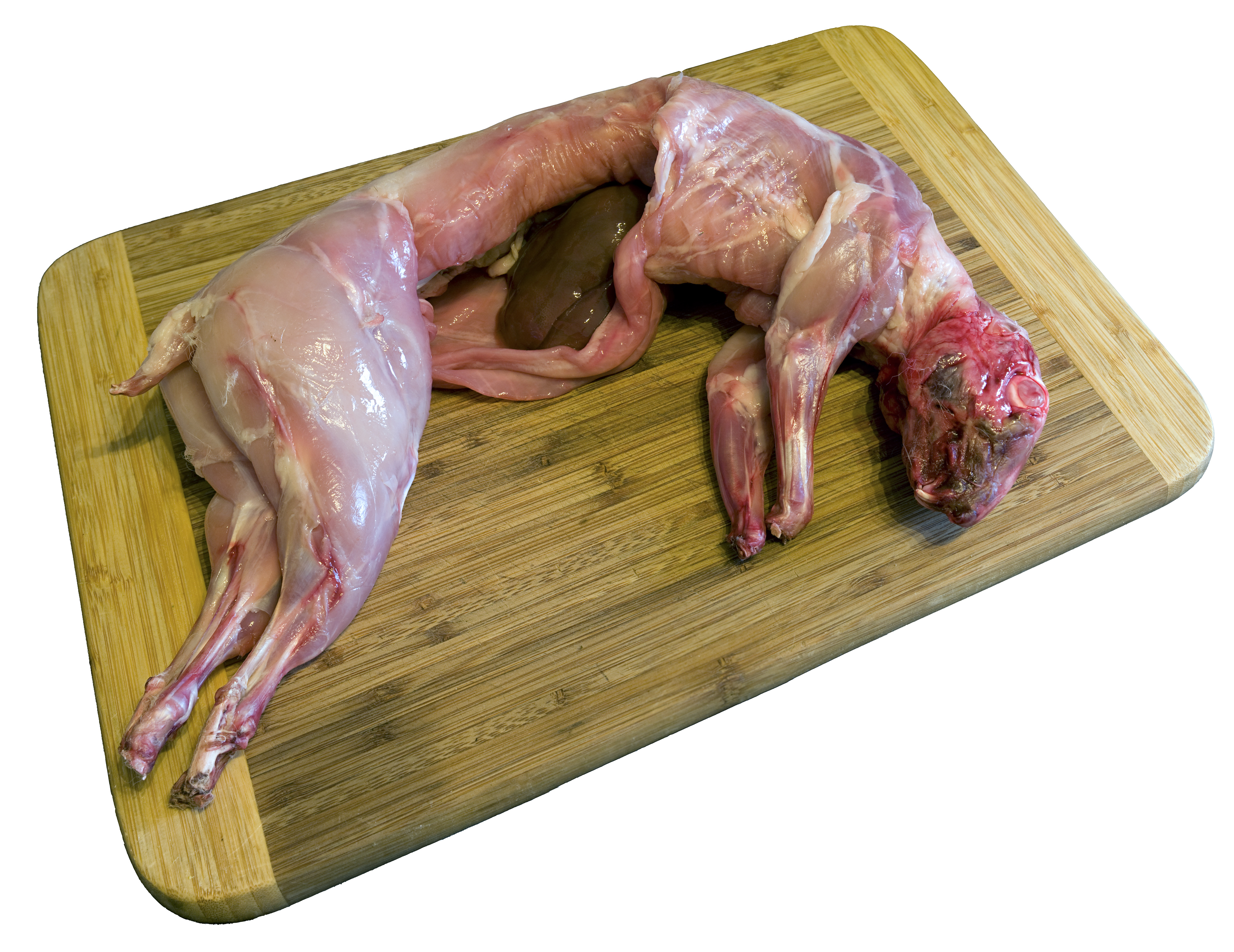
A slaughtered rabbit

Animal slaughter is the killing of nonhuman animals, and often refers to the slaughter of livestock. Animals may be slaughtered for humans to obtain food, and also if they are diseased and unable to be consumed as food.

=== Cultural and religious aspects ===
==== Halal meat ====
Halāl (Arabic: حلال ḥalāl, 'permissible'), also spelled "hallal" or "halaal", is any object or an action which is permissible to use or engage in, according to Islamic law. The term covers and designates not only food and drink but also all matters of daily life. There are three ways of halal killing: slitting of the throat (dabh), plunging the knife into the dimple over the breast bone (nahr), and killing in some other way ('aqr). The name of God (bismillah) must be said before killing the animal. The killing must be swift and with no prior stunning of the animal being killed. Blood must be drained out of the carcass.

==== Ikejime ====
Ikejime is a method of paralyzing fish to maintain the quality of its meat. The technique originated in Japan, but is now in widespread use. It involves the insertion of a spike quickly and directly into the hind brain, usually located slightly behind and above the eye, thereby causing immediate brain death.

==== Kashrut (Kosher) ====
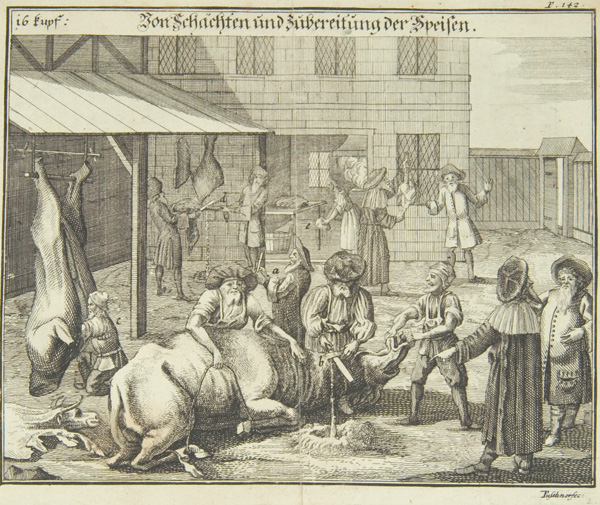
Kosher killing illustration from Juedisches Ceremoniel

Kashrut (also kashruth or kashrus, כַּשְׁרוּת) is the set of Jewish religious dietary laws. Food that may be consumed according to halakha (Jewish law) is termed kosher /ˈkoʊʃər/ in English, from the Ashkenazi pronunciation of the Hebrew term kashér (כָּשֵׁר), meaning "fit" (in this context, fit for consumption). Shechita is the process of slaughtering prescribed by Jewish dietary laws.

==== Qurban ====
Qurbān usually denotes the sacrifice of a livestock animal during Eid al-Adha, a Muslim holiday.

==== Shechita ====
In Shechita the killing must be performed by a shochet (Hebrew: שוחט). The process involves severing the trachea, esophagus, carotid arteries, jugular veins and vagus nerve swiftly with a special knife which is extremely sharp. This is done with the intention of causing a rapid drop in blood pressure in the brain and loss of consciousness, to reduce the pain felt by the animal and exsanguinate it at the same time.

==== Tza'ar ba'alei chayim ====
Tza'ar ba'alei chayim (literally means: "the suffering of living creatures") is the Jewish principle which bans inflicting unnecessary pain on animals. This concept is not clearly enunciated in the written Torah, but was accepted by the Talmud (Bava Metzia 32b) as being a Biblical mandate.

=== Laboratory testing ===
In 2014 nearly 25 million animals were killed in the United States for laboratory testing, with most being "designer" mice.

=== Legal aspects ===
==== Humane Slaughter Act ====
The Humane Slaughter Act is a United States federal law formulated to decrease livestock suffering during slaughter. The act was approved on August 27, 1958.

== Animals killing each other ==
The smallest animal that can kill a human is the Naegleria fowleri amoeba. N. fowleri does this by crawling up the target's nose and eating the targets' brain. Most attacks happen in moist areas like ponds or lakes.

In the middle is the blowfish (fugu) that can kill animals with its toxic organs that contain tetrodotoxin.

The largest animal killer is the blue whale, which is the largest animal on Earth. The blue whale mostly feeds on krill (euphausiacea) which is a small, abundant crustacean. Blue whales are almost entirely killed by killer whales and by humans.

Chimpanzees wage war against rival groups, killing rival males and eating the baby chimps. Ants also wage warfare on other ants, even engaging in cannibalism.

== Killer plants ==
=== Deadly if consumed ===
Many plant based items if eaten in sufficient quantities can cause seizures, spasms, tremors, gastroenteritis, cardiovascular collapse, coma, and then death.

==== Ornamental plants ====
- Foxglove (Digitalis purpurea)
- Hydrangea (Hydrangea macrophylla)
- Larkspur (Delphinium consolida)
- Lily-of-the-Valley (Convallaria majalis)
- Mistletoe (Phoradendron flavescens)
- Mountain Laurel (Kalmia latifolia)
- Oleander (Nerium oleander)
- Poet's Narcissus (Narcissus poeticus)
- Poinsettia (Euphorbia pulcherrima)
- Purple Nightshade (Atropa belladonna)
- Rhododendron (Rhododendron ponticum)
- Water Hemlock/Spotted Parsley (Cicuta maculata)

==== In the wild ====
- Elderberry
- Poison mushroom

==== Products ====
- Castor oil (from the Castor bean)

==== Foods ====
- Ackee
- Apple seeds
- Bitter almonds
- Cherry pits
- Green potatoes or potato leaf tea
- Nutmeg
- Raw lima beans
- Red kidney beans

=== Kills by consuming ===
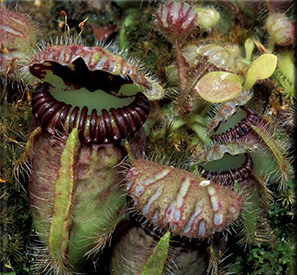
Albany or Western Australian Pitcher Plant. One species occupying peaty swamps in southwestern Australia.

Many plants kill animals by trapping or poisoning them, then digesting them for nourishment. Some plants can kill a rodent with various methods.

- Albany or Western Australian Pitcher Plant (Cephalotus)
- Pitcher plant (Nepenthes northiana) – kills and then digests frogs and rats
- Venus Flytrap (Dionaea)
- Waterwheel Plant (Aldrovanda)

== Hunting ==
In North America, animals such as bear, wolf, caribou, moose, elk, boar, sheep and bison are hunted. In South America, deer and other species are hunted. In Europe, sheep, boar, goats, elk, deer, and other species are hunted. In Asia, several species of deer, bear, sheep and other species are hunted. In Australia, several species of deer and wild boar are hunted.

=== Big-game ===
Big-game hunting is the hunting of large game, almost always large terrestrial mammals, for meat, other animal by-products (such as horn or bone), trophy or sport. The term is historically associated with the hunting of Africa's "big five" game (lion, African elephant, Cape buffalo, leopard and rhinoceros), and with tigers and rhinoceroses on the Indian subcontinent. Along with the big five animals, many other species are hunted including but not limited to kudu, antelope, and hartebeest. Moose, elk, bear, mountain lion, caribou, bison and deer are the largest game hunted in North America, which is where most big-game hunting is conducted today.

Big-game hunting is conducted in Africa, North America, South America, Europe, Asia and Australia. In Africa, lion, Cape buffalo, elephant, giraffe and other large game animals are hunted.

=== Roadkill ===
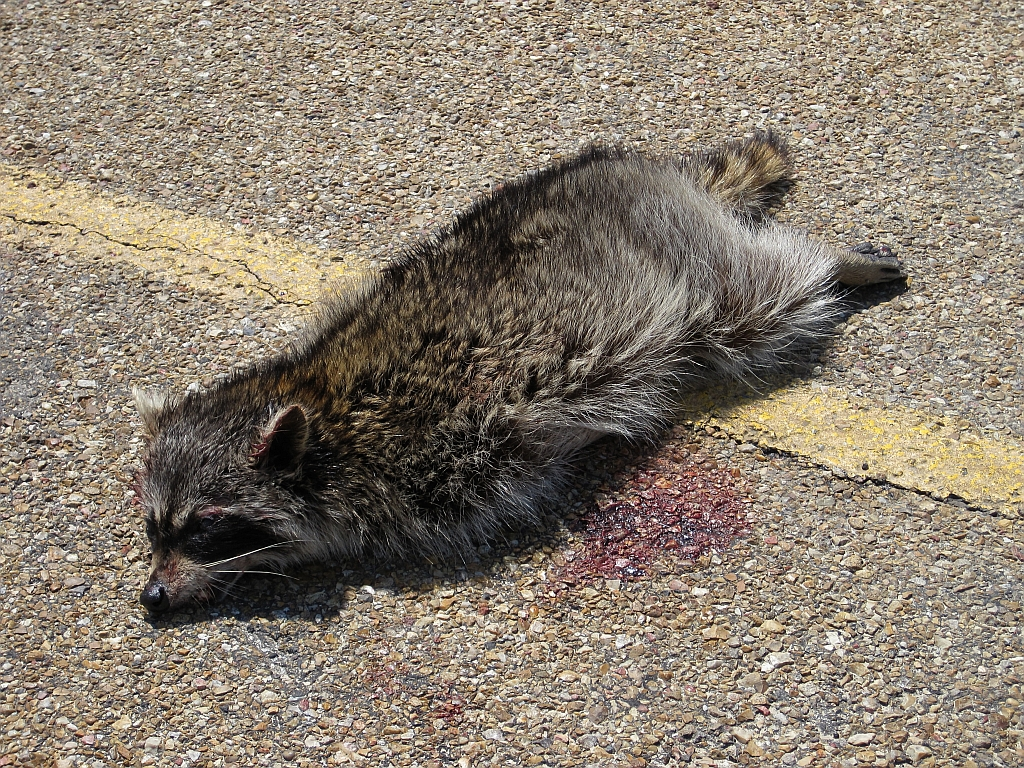
Racoon victim of roadkill

Animals are often killed by moving vehicles. This is known as roadkill. In one case in North Carolina in early 2016 a deer was road killed and butchered outside a restaurant. A concerned citizen took cell phone images and called the police. The restaurant owner was contacted by the police and stated that he had no intention of selling roadkill meals to his customers. Because the deer was butchered outside the restaurant the authorities decided to drop the matter. The restaurant owner also stated he was not aware of any prohibition against eating roadkill; he merely wanted to try something new. In many areas in the United States it is illegal to consume roadkill. However, as of November 2014 it is estimated that 34 percent of U.S. states have passed laws allowing the gleaning of roadkill.

== Alternatives and reactions ==
=== Cecil the lion ===
When Cecil the lion was killed in Africa in summer 2015 by Minnesota dentist Walter Palmer it caused a worldwide commotion. As of July 2015 Palmer went into hiding when it was alleged that his guides and he had lured Cecil out of a Zimbabwe animal preserve at which point Palmer admittedly shot Cecil with an arrow. Cecil ran off wounded for 40 hours before Palmer's guides found Cecil, admittedly shot him, and decapitated him, leaving Cecil's head and tracking collar behind. Palmer later broke silence to say he was heartbroken over the pain he had caused his dental staff.

=== People for the Ethical Treatment of Animals ===
People for the Ethical Treatment of Animals (PETA) is an animal rights group founded in America and is based in Norfolk, Virginia. It is led by Ingrid Newkirk. It claims to have 3 million members and supporters, which would make it the largest animal rights group in the world. Its slogan is "animals are not ours to eat, wear, experiment on, use for entertainment, or abuse in any other way."

=== Veganism and vegetarianism ===
Veganism is the practice of abstaining from the use of all animal products, particularly in diet. Vegetarianism is the practice of abstaining from the consumption of meat (red meat, poultry, seafood, insects and the flesh of any other animal and may also include abstention from by-products of animal slaughter). Vegetarians, however, may consume eggs, dairy products, honey, products that are tested on animals and clothing made with animal-derived materials such as leather and animal fur. There are also sub-variations of Vegetarianism, and they are: Ovo-lacto vegetarianism (consumes milk and eggs), Lacto-vegetarianism (milk), and Ovo-vegetarianism (eggs).

=== Ahimsa ===
Ahimsa is an important tenet of three Indian-origin religions (Jainism, Hinduism, and Buddhism). Ahimsa is a multidimensional concept, inspired by the premise that all living beings have the spark of the divine spiritual energy; therefore, to hurt another being is to hurt oneself. Ahimsa has also been related to the notion that any violence has karmic consequences.

== See also ==
- Animal ethics
- Animal law
- Animal rights
- Animal welfare
- Cannibalism
- Carnism
- Chick culling
- Cruelty to animals
- No-kill shelter
- Poaching
- Unclean animal
