= Ahimsa =

Ancient Indian principle of nonviolence

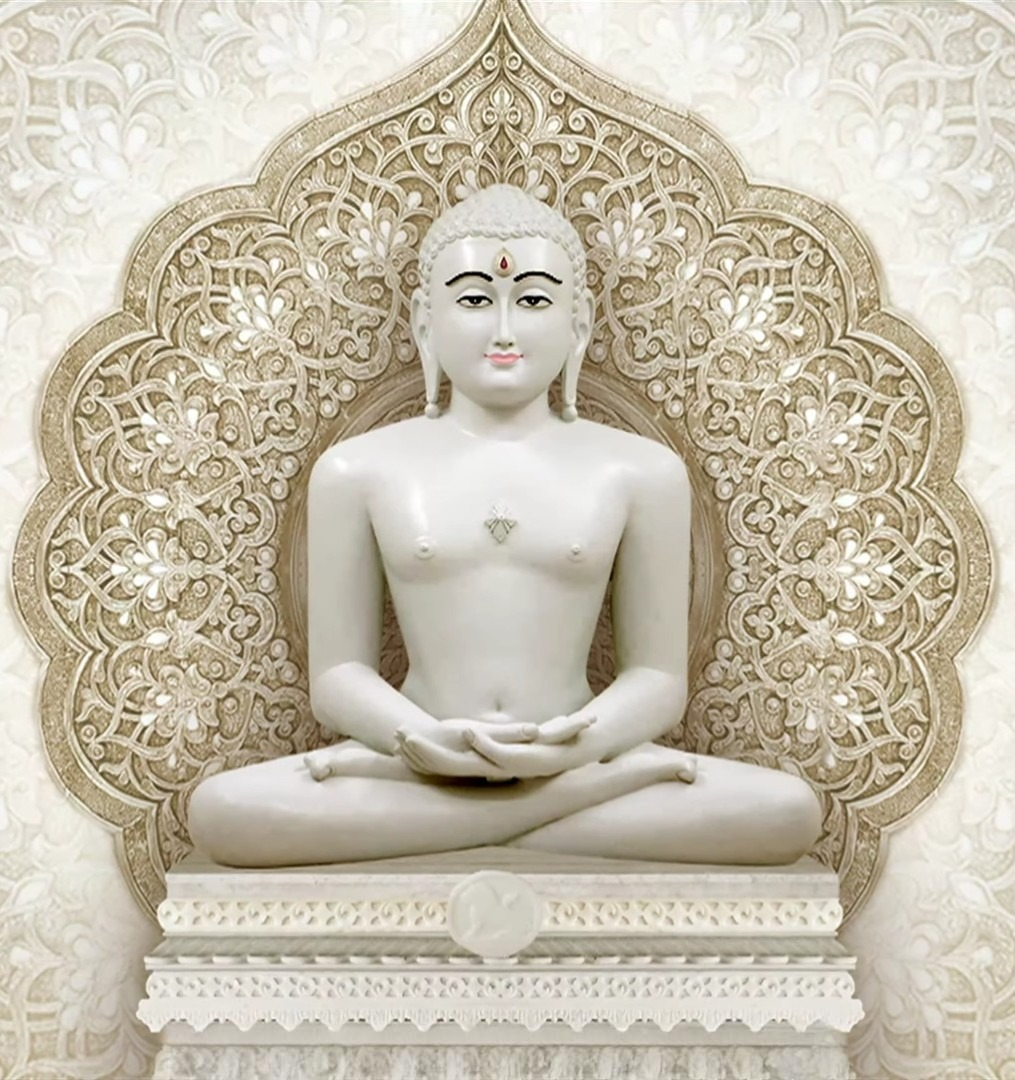
Mahavira, the 24th tirthankara of Jainism, was a major proponent of ahimsa

Ahimsa (Sanskrit: अहिंसा, IAST: ahiṃsā; IPA: [ɐ́.ɦĩ.sɑː]; lit. 'nonviolence') is the ancient Indian principle of nonviolence that applies to actions toward all living beings. It is a key virtue in Jainism, Buddhism, and Hinduism.

Ahimsa (also spelled Ahinsa) is one of the cardinal virtues of Jainism, where it is the first of the Pancha Mahavrata. It is also one of the central precepts of Hinduism and the first of the five precepts of Buddhism. Ahimsa is inspired by the premise that all living beings have the spark of the divine spiritual energy; therefore, to hurt another being is to hurt oneself. Ahimsa is also related to the notion that all acts of violence have karmic consequences. Ancient scholars of Brahmanism investigated and refined the principles of ahimsa, but the concept reached an extraordinary development in the ethical philosophy of Jainism. Mahavira, the 24th and the last tirthankara of Jainism, further strengthened the idea in the 6th century BCE. About the 5th century CE, Valluvar emphasized ahimsa and moral vegetarianism as virtues for an individual, which formed the core of his teachings in the Kural. Perhaps the most popular advocate of ahimsa in modern times was the leader of the Indian independence movement Mahatma Gandhi.

Ahimsa's precept that humans should "cause no injury" to another living being includes one's deeds, words, and thoughts. Classical Hindu texts such as the Mahabharata and the Ramayana, as well as modern scholars, disagree about what the principle of Ahimsa dictates when one is faced with war and other situations that require self-defence. In this way, historical Indian literature has contributed to just war theory and self-defence.

== Etymology ==
The word Ahimsa—sometimes spelled Ahinsa—derives from the Sanskrit root hiṃs, meaning to strike; hiṃsā is injury or harm, while a-hiṃsā (prefixed with the alpha privative), its opposite, is non-harming or nonviolence.

== Historical evolution ==
Reverence for ahimsa can be found in Jain, Hindu, and Buddhist canonical texts. Lord Parshvanatha (the 23rd of Jainism's 24 Tirthankaras) is said to have preached ahimsa as one of the four vows. Scholars describe nonviolence as a central doctrinal and practical principle of Jainism, developed to an extent that distinguishes it from most other religious traditions of the Indian subcontinent.

=== Pre-Vedic and Shramanic roots hypothesis ===
The Rigveda (c. 1500 BCE) is the oldest surviving text in India, but many scholars believe the specific ethical practice of ahimsa originated in the non-Vedic Sramana traditions (which include Jainism and Buddhism) before being absorbed into Brahmanism.

Some scholars, such as P. R. Deshmukh, suggest that the roots of ahimsa and asceticism may date to the Indus Valley Civilisation (c. 3300–1300 BCE), citing the discovery of seals depicting figures in the kayotsarga (standing meditation) posture common to Jain iconography.

Indologist Johannes Bronkhorst has proposed the "Greater Magadha" theory, arguing that the eastern Gangetic plain (modern Bihar/Bengal) developed a distinct non-Vedic culture where concepts like Karma, rebirth, and ahimsa originated. According to this view, the Vedic priesthood later adopted these concepts as they expanded eastward. Similarly, the German Indologist Ludwig Alsdorf argued that ahimsa likely began not as a moral rule but as a "magico-ritualistic" taboo against killing or harming living beings, which was part of a pan-Indian or pre-Aryan heritage later refined into an ethical system by the Jains.

=== Evolution in the Vedic tradition ===
The concept of ahimsa evolved gradually within the Vedic tradition. In the early Vedic period (c. 1500–1000 BCE), animal sacrifice was a central component of ritual life. Then the concept transitioned from a ritualistic concern-avoiding injury to the sacrificer or the minute details of the ritual—to an internalized ethical virtue.

By the late Vedic era, texts like the Chandogya Upanishad (c. 8th century BCE) explicitly listed ahimsa as one of five essential virtues (along with truthfulness and charity). The Yajurveda reflects this shifting ethos with prayers for universal peace, such as: "May all beings look at me with a friendly eye, may I do likewise, and may we look at each other with the eyes of a friend".

=== Integration into governance ===
The principle of ahimsa moved from personal asceticism to state policy under the Mauryan Emperor Ashoka (c. 268–232 BCE). Following the Kalinga War, Ashoka renounced military conquest in favor of "conquest by Dharma". His Rock Edicts restricted animal slaughter, established medical care for animals, and promoted nonviolence as a civic duty, embedding the Shramanic value of ahimsa into India's political fabric.

== Jainism ==
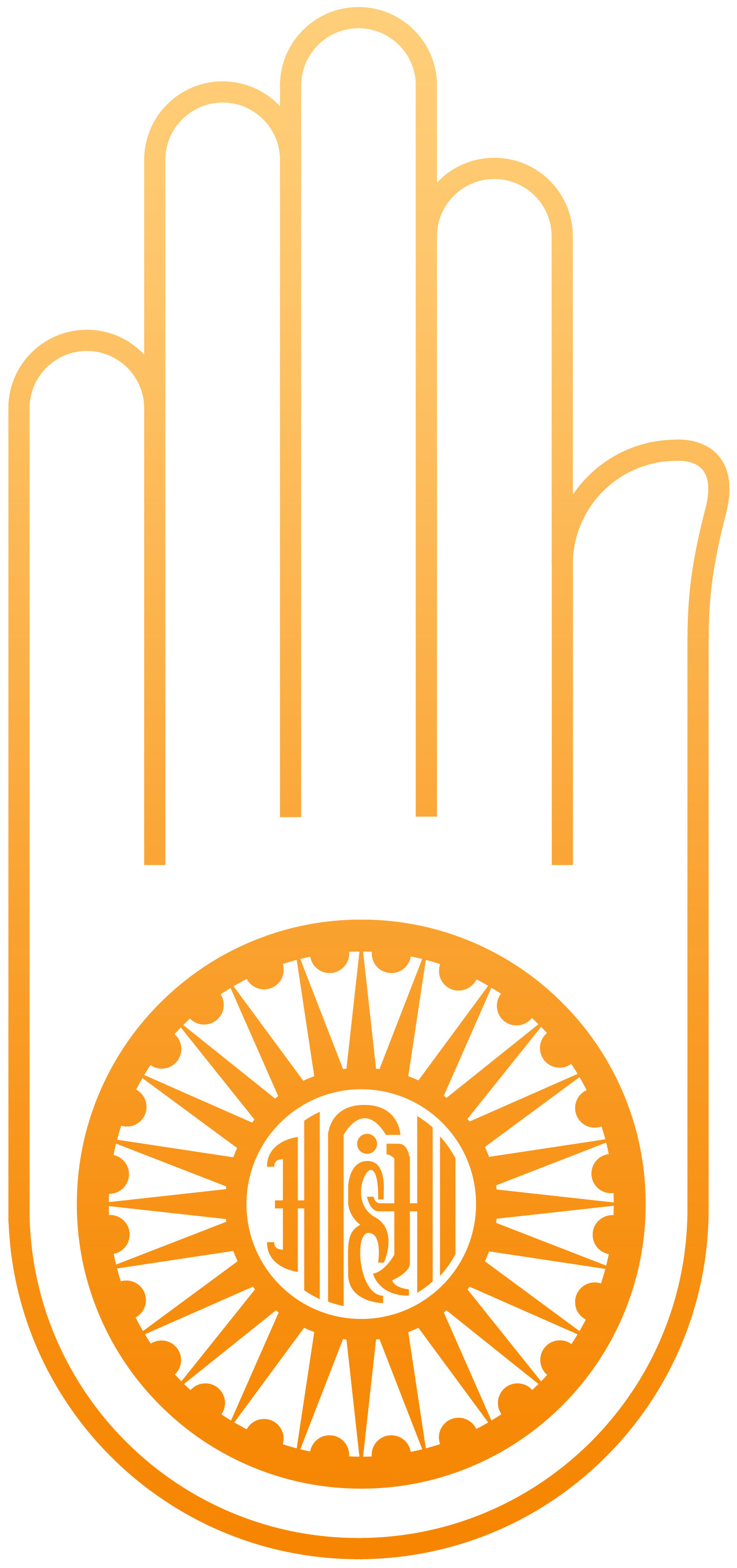
The hand with a wheel on the palm symbolises the Jain Vow of Ahimsa. The word in the middle is Ahimsa. The wheel represents the dharmacakra which stands for the resolve to halt the cycle of reincarnation through relentless pursuit of truth and non-violence.

In Jainism, the understanding and implementation of ahimsa is more radical, scrupulous, and comprehensive than in any other religion. Killing any living being out of passions like attachment is considered hiṃsā (to injure) and abstaining from such an act is ahimsā (noninjury). The vow of ahimsā is considered the foremost among the "five vows of Jainism". Other vows like truth (satya) are meant for safeguarding the vow of ahimsā.

The statement ahimsā paramo dharmaḥ (or, "Non-injury/nonviolence/harmlessness is the supreme/ultimate/paramount/highest/absolute duty/virtue/attribute/religion" (Note: slashes are used here to present alternative denotations)) is often found inscribed on the walls of the Jain temples. As in Hinduism, the aim is to prevent the accumulation of harmful karma.

=== The Hierarchy of Life ===
The Jain concept of ahimsa is characterised by detailed classifications of life. Jains categorize living beings (jiva) based on their sensory faculties (indriyas), ranging from one-sensed beings (plants, water, earth) to five-sensed beings (humans, animals).

Killing of animals for food is absolutely ruled out. Jains also make considerable efforts not to injure plants in everyday life as far as possible. Though they admit that plants must be destroyed for the sake of food, they accept such violence only inasmuch as it is indispensable for human survival, and there are special instructions for preventing unnecessary violence against plants. Jain monks and nuns go out of their way so as not to hurt even small insects and other minuscule animals. Both the renouncers and the laypeople of Jain faith reject meat, fish, alcohol, and honey as these are believed to harm large or minuscule life forms.

=== Ascetic vs. householder codes ===
In the practice of ahimsa, the requirements are less strict for the lay persons (sravakas) who have undertaken anuvrata (Smaller Vows) than for the Jain monastics who are bound by the Mahavrata "Great Vows".

Jain scholars have debated the potential injury to other life forms during one's occupation. Certain Jain texts (according to Padmanabh Jaini, a Jainism scholar) forbid people of its faith from husbandry, agriculture, and trade in animal-derived products. Some Jains abstain from farming because it inevitably entails unintentional killing or injuring of many small animals, such as worms and insects. These teachings, in part, have led the Jain community to focus on trade, merchant, clerical, and administrative occupations to minimize arambhaja-himsa (occupational violence against all life forms). For the layperson, the teaching has been of ahimsa with pramada – that is, reducing violence through proper intention and being careful in every action on a daily basis to minimize violence to all life forms.

=== Intellectual non-violence ===
When Mahavira revived and reorganised the Jain faith in the 6th or 5th century BCE, ahimsa was already an established, strictly observed rule. Rishabhanatha (Ādinātha), the first Jain Tirthankara, whom modern Western historians consider to be a historical figure, followed by Parshvanatha (Pārśvanātha) the twenty-third Tirthankara lived in about the 9th century BCE. He founded the community to which Mahavira's parents belonged. Ahimsa was already part of the "Fourfold Restraint" (Caujjama), the vows taken by Parshva's followers. In the times of Mahavira and in the following centuries, Jains were at odds with both Buddhists and followers of the Vedic religion or Hindus, whom they accused of negligence and inconsistency in the implementation of ahimsa. According to the Jain tradition either lacto vegetarianism or veganism is prescribed.

=== Just war and self-defense ===
The Jain texts, unlike most Hindu and Buddhist texts on just war, have been inconsistent. For its monastic community – sadhu and sadhvi – the historically accepted practice has been to "willingly sacrifice one's own life" to the attacker, to not retaliate, so that the mendicant may keep the First Great Vow of "total nonviolence". Jain literature of the 10th century CE, for example, describes a king ready for war and being given lessons about non-violence by the Jain acharya (spiritual teacher). In the 12th century CE and thereafter, in an era of violent raids, destruction of temples, the slaughter of agrarian communities and ascetics by Islamic armies, Jain scholars reconsidered the First Great Vow of mendicants and its parallel for the laypeople. The medieval texts of this era, such as by Jinadatta Suri, recommended both the mendicants and the laypeople to fight and kill if that would prevent greater and continued violence on humans and other life forms (virodhi-himsa). Such exemptions to ahimsa is a relatively rare teaching in Jain texts, states Dundas.

=== Modern reception ===
The leader of the Indian independence movement Mahatma Gandhi stated, "No religion in the World has explained the principle of Ahiṃsā so deeply and systematically as is discussed with its applicability in every human life in Jainism. As and when the benevolent principle of Ahiṃsā or non-violence will be ascribed for practice by the people of the world to achieve their end of life in this world and beyond, Jainism is sure to have the uppermost status and Mahāvīra is sure to be respected as the greatest authority on Ahiṃsā".

== Hinduism ==
=== Ancient Vedic texts ===
Ahimsa as an ethical concept evolved in the Vedic texts. The oldest scriptures indirectly mention Ahimsa. Over time, the Hindu scripts revised ritual practices, and the concept of Ahimsa was increasingly refined and emphasized until it became the highest virtue by the late Vedic era. The Yajurveda, dated between 1200 BCE and 900 BCE, says, "may all beings look at me with a friendly eye, may I do likewise, and may we look at each other with the eyes of a friend".

The term Ahimsa appears in the text Taittiriya Shakha of the Yajurveda (TS 5.2.8.7), where it refers to non-injury to the sacrificer. It occurs several times in the Shatapatha Brahmana in the sense of "non-injury". The Ahimsa doctrine is a late Vedic era development in Brahmanical culture. The earliest reference to the idea of nonviolence to animals (pashu-Ahimsa), apparently in a moral sense, is in the Kapisthala Katha Samhita of the Yajurveda (KapS 31.11), which may have been written around 1500-1200 BCE. The Chandogya Upanishad (3.17.4) includes ahimsa in its list of virtues.

According to John Bowker, the word appears but is uncommon in the principal Upanishads. Kaneda gives examples of the word pashu-Ahimsa in these Upanishads. Other scholars suggest Ahimsa as an ethical concept started evolving in the Vedas, becoming an increasingly central concept in the Upanishads.

The Chāndogya Upaniṣad, dated to 800 to 600 BCE, one of the oldest Upanishads, has the earliest evidence of Vedic use of the word Ahimsa in the sense familiar in Hinduism (a code of conduct). It bars violence against "all creatures" (sarvabhuta), and the practitioner of Ahimsa is said to escape the cycle of rebirths (CU 8.15.1). Some scholars say this mention may have been a Jainist influence on Vedic Hinduism. Others scholar say that is speculative, and though Jainism is an ancient tradition, the oldest traceable texts of Jainism are from many centuries after the Vedic era ended.

Chāndogya Upaniṣad also names Ahimsa, along with Satyavacanam (truthfulness), Ārjavam (sincerity), Dānam (charity), and Tapo (penance/meditation), as one of five essential virtues (CU 3.17.4).

The Sandilya Upanishad lists ten forbearances: Ahimsa, Satya, Asteya, Brahmacharya, Daya, Arjava, Kshama, Dhriti, Mitahara, and Saucha. According to Kaneda, the term Ahimsa is an important spiritual doctrine shared by Hinduism, Buddhism, and Jainism. It means 'non-injury' and 'non-killing'. It implies total avoidance of harming any living creature by deeds, words, or thoughts.

=== The Epics ===
The Hindu epic the Mahabharata repeatedly uses the phrase Ahimsa Paramo Dharma (अहिंसा परमॊ धर्मः), which literally means "nonviolence is the highest moral virtue". For example, Anushasana Parva has the verse:

अहिंसा परमो धर्मः तथाहिंसा परो दमः।
अहिंसा परमं दानम् अहिंसा परमस्तपः।
अहिंसा परमो यज्ञः तथाहिंसा परं बलम्।
अहिंसा परमं मित्रम् अहिंसा परमं सुखम्।
अहिंसा परमं सत्यम् अहिंसा परमं श्रुतम्॥

The above passage from Mahabharata emphasises the cardinal importance of Ahimsa in Hinduism, and literally means:

Ahimsa is the highest Dharma, Ahimsa is the highest self-control,
Ahimsa is the greatest gift, Ahimsa is the best practice,
Ahimsa is the highest sacrifice, Ahimsa is the finest strength,
Ahimsa is the greatest friend, Ahimsa is the greatest happiness,
Ahimsa is the highest truth, and Ahimsa is the greatest teaching.

The phrase Ahimsa Paramo Dharma also appears in Adi Parva, Vana Parva, and Anushasana Parva. The Bhagavad Gita discusses doubts and questions about appropriate response when one faces systematic violence or war. These verses develop the concepts of lawful violence in self-defence and just war theory. But there is no consensus on this interpretation. Gandhi, for example, considered this debate about nonviolence and lawful violence a mere metaphor for the war within a human being when they face moral questions.

=== Self-defence, criminal law, and war ===
The classical texts of Hinduism devote numerous chapters to discussing what people who practice the virtue of ahimsa can and must do when faced with war, violent threat, or the need to sentence someone convicted of a crime. These discussions have led to theories of just war, ideas of reasonable self-defense, and views of proportionate punishment. Arthashastra discusses, among other things, what constitutes proportionate response and punishment.

War

The precepts of ahimsa in Hinduism require that war must be avoided, with sincere and truthful dialogue. Force must be the last resort. If war becomes necessary, its cause must be just, its purpose virtuous, its objective to restrain the wicked, its aim peace, and its method lawful. War may be started and stopped only by a legitimate authority. Weapons must be proportionate to the opponent and the goal, not indiscriminate tools of destruction. All strategies and weapons used in war must be to defeat the opponent, not to cause them misery; for example, arrows are allowed, but arrows smeared with painful poison are not. Warriors must use judgment in the battlefield. Cruelty to opponents is forbidden. Wounded, unarmed opponents must not be attacked or killed but instead given medical care. Children, women, and civilians must not be injured. While the war is in progress, sincere dialogue for peace must continue.

Self-defence

Different interpretations of ancient Hindu texts have been offered in matters of self-defense. For example, Tähtinen suggests self-defense is appropriate, criminals are not protected by the rule of ahimsa, and Hindu scriptures support violence against an armed attacker. ahimsa is not meant to imply pacifism.

Alternative theories of self-defense, inspired by ahimsa, build principles similar to ideas of just war. Aikido, pioneered in Japan, illustrates one such set of principles for self-defense. Morihei Ueshiba, the founder of Aikido, described his inspiration as Ahimsa. According to this interpretation of ahimsa in self-defense, one must not assume that the world is free of aggression. One must presume that some people will, out of ignorance, error, or fear, attack others or intrude into their space, physically or verbally. The aim of self-defense, suggested Ueshiba, must be to neutralize the attacker's aggression and avoid conflict. The best defense is one with which the victim is protected and the attacker is respected and not injured if possible. Under ahimsa and Aikido, there are no enemies, and appropriate self-defense focuses on neutralizing the immaturity, assumptions, and aggressive strivings of the attacker.

Criminal law

Tähtinen concludes that Hindus have no misgivings about the death penalty; their position is that evil-doers who deserve death should be killed and that a king, in particular, is obliged to punish criminals and should not hesitate to kill them, even if they happen to be his brothers and sons.

Other scholars conclude that Hindu scriptures suggest that sentences for any crime must be fair, proportional, and not cruel.

=== Non-human life ===
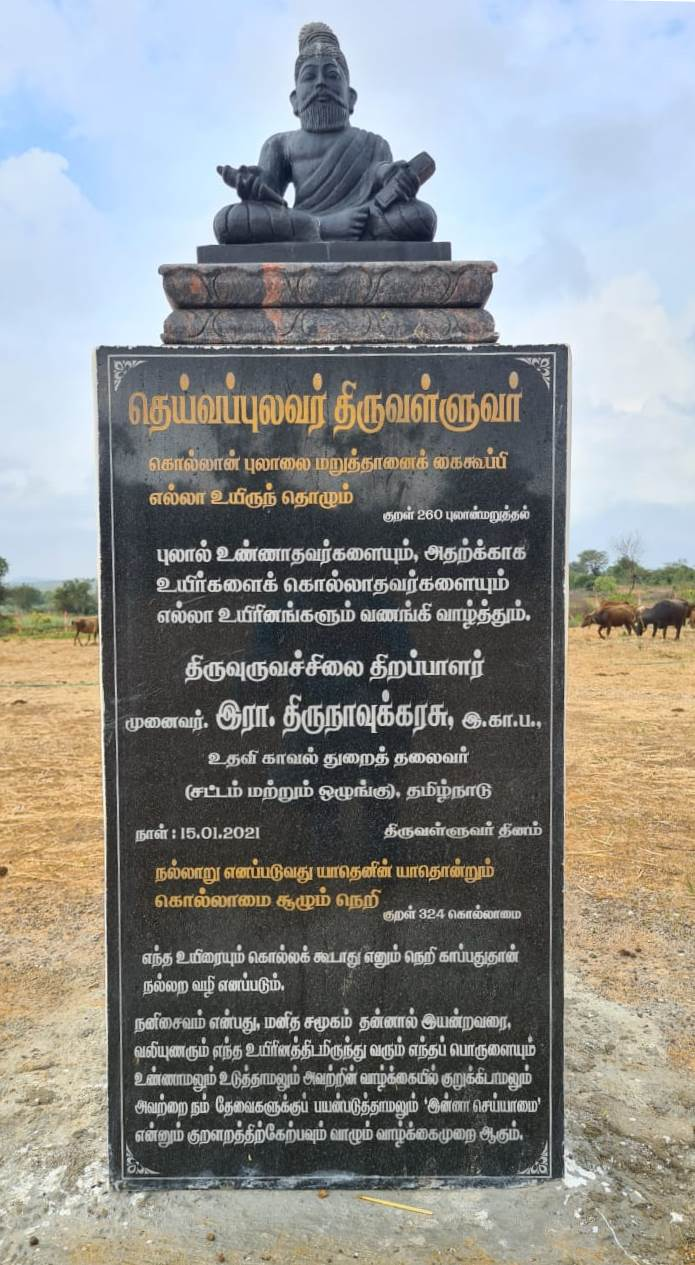
The 5th-century CE Tamil scholar Valluvar, in his Tirukkural, taught ahimsa and moral vegetarianism as personal virtues. The plaque in this statue of Valluvar at an animal sanctuary at Tiruvallur describes the Kural's teachings on ahimsa and non-killing, summing them up with the definition of veganism.

The Hindu precept of "cause no injury" applies to animals and all life forms. This precept is not found in the oldest verses of Vedas (1500–1000 BCE), but increasingly becomes one of the central ideas in post-Vedic period. In the oldest layer of the Vedas, such as the Rigveda, ritual sacrifices of animals and cooking of meat to feed guests are mentioned. This included goat, ox, horse, and others. However, the text is not uniform in its prescriptions. Some verses praise meat as food, while other verses in the Vedas recommend "abstention from meat", in particular, "beef". According to Marvin Harris, the Vedic literature is inconsistent, with some verses suggesting ritual slaughter and meat consumption, while others suggesting a taboo on meat-eating.

Hindu texts dated to 1st millennium BCE initially mention meat as food, then evolve to suggest that only meat obtained through ritual sacrifice can be eaten, thereafter evolving to the stance that one should eat no meat because it hurts animals, with verses describing the noble life as one that lives on flowers, roots, and fruits alone. The late Vedic-era literature (pre-500 BCE) condemns all killings of men, cattle, birds, and horses, and prays to god Agni to punish those who kill.

Later texts of Hinduism declare ahimsa as one of the primary virtues, declare any killing or harming any life as against dharma (moral life). Finally, the discussion in the Upanishads and Hindu Epics shifts to whether a human being can ever live his or her life without harming animal and plant life in some way, which and when plants or animal meat may be eaten, whether violence against animals causes human beings to become less compassionate, and if and how one may exert least harm to non-human life consistent with ahimsa, given the constraints of life and human needs. The Mahabharata permits hunting by warriors, but opposes it in the case of hermits who must be strictly non-violent. Sushruta Samhita, a Hindu text written in the 3rd or 4th century BCE, in Chapter XLVI suggests proper diet as a means of treating certain illnesses, and recommends various fishes and meats for different ailments and for pregnant women, and the Charaka Samhita describes meat as superior to all other kinds of food for convalescents.

Across the texts of Hinduism, there is a profusion of ideas about the virtue of ahimsa when applied to non-human life, but without a universal consensus. Alsdorf claims the debate and disagreements between supporters of vegetarian lifestyle and meat eaters was significant. Even suggested exceptions – ritual slaughter and hunting – were challenged by advocates of ahimsa. In the Mahabharata both sides present various arguments to substantiate their viewpoints. Moreover, a hunter defends his profession in a long discourse.

Many of the arguments proposed in favor of non-violence to animals refer to the bliss one feels, the rewards it entails before or after death, the danger and harm it prevents, as well as to the karmic consequences of violence.

The ancient Hindu texts discuss ahimsa and non-animal life. They discourage wanton destruction of nature including of wild and cultivated plants. Hermits (sannyasins) were urged to live on a fruitarian diet so as to avoid the destruction of plants. Scholars claim the principles of ecological nonviolence are innate in the Hindu tradition, and its conceptual fountain has been ahimsa as its cardinal virtue.

The classical literature of the Indian religions, such as Hinduism and Jainism, exists in many Indian languages. For example, the Tirukkural, written in three volumes, likely between 450 and 500 CE, dedicates verses 251–260 and 321–333 of its first volume to the virtue of ahimsa, emphasizing on moral vegetarianism and non-killing (kollamai). However, the Tirukkural also glorifies soldiers and their valour during war, and states that it is king's duty to punish criminals and implement "death sentence for the wicked".

In 1960, H. Jay Dinshah founded the American Vegan Society (AVS), linking veganism to the concept of ahimsa.

=== Modern times ===
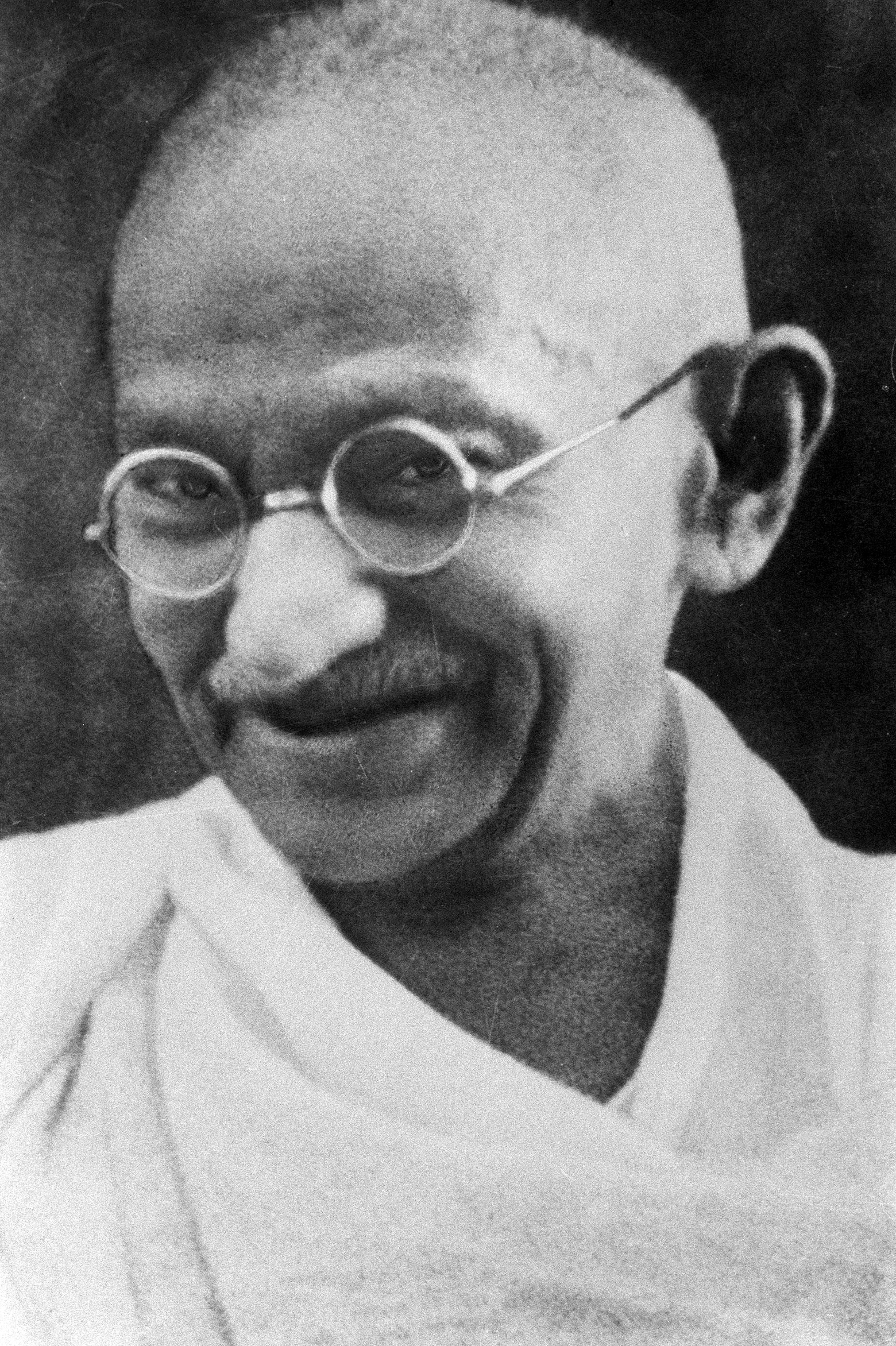
Mahatma Gandhi, who promoted the principle of ahimsa by applying it to politics.

In the 19th and 20th centuries, prominent figures of Indian spirituality such as Shrimad Rajchandra and Swami Vivekananda emphasised the importance of Ahimsa.

Gandhi successfully promoted the principle of ahimsa to all spheres of life, in particular to politics (Swaraj). His non-violent resistance movement satyagraha had an immense impact on India, impressed public opinion in Western countries, and influenced the leaders of various civil and political rights movements such as the American civil rights movement's Martin Luther King Jr. and James Bevel. In Gandhi's thought, ahimsa precludes not only the act of inflicting a physical injury but also mental states like evil thoughts and hatred, and unkind behavior such as harsh words, dishonesty, and lying, all of which he saw as manifestations of violence incompatible with ahimsa. Gandhi believed ahimsa to be a creative energy force, encompassing all interactions leading one's self to find satya, "Divine Truth". Sri Aurobindo criticized the Gandhian concept of ahimsa as unrealistic and not universally applicable, noting that while it is a spiritual truth, it should not be applied as a "rigid ethical rule" to all of humanity. He adopted a pragmatic non-pacifist position, holding that the justification of violence depends on the specific circumstances and the "dharma" (duty/righteousness) of the situation. While he advocated passive resistance as a political policy for India's independence, he maintained that a nation is entitled to use violence for its self-preservation if necessary.

Gandhi took the religious principle of ahimsa, and turned it into a non-violent tool for mass action. He used it to fight not only British rule in India, but Indian social issues such as casteism and untouchability as well. Gandhi stated his belief that "[a]himsa is in Hinduism, it is in Christianity as well as in Islam." He added, "Nonviolence is common to all religions, but it has found the highest expression and application in Hinduism (I do not regard Jainism or Buddhism as separate from Hinduism)." When questioned whether violence and nonviolence are taught in Quran, he stated, "I have heard from many Muslim friends that the Koran teaches the use of nonviolence. (... The) argument about nonviolence in the Holy Koran is an interpolation, not necessary for my thesis."

Studying ahimsa's history and philosophy influenced Albert Schweitzer's principle of "reverence for life". He commended Indian traditions for their ethics of ahimsa, considering the prohibition against killing and harming "one of the greatest events in the spiritual history of humankind". However, he noted that "not-killing" and "not-harming" might be unfeasible in certain situations, like self-defense, or ethically complex, as in cases of prolonged famine.

=== Yoga ===
Ahimsa means "abstinence from malice towards all living creatures in every way and at all times". Ahimsa is imperative for practitioners of Patañjali's eight limb Raja yoga system. It is included in the first limb and is the first of five Yamas (self restraints) which, together with the second limb, make up the code of ethical conduct in Yoga philosophy. Commentators on the Yoga Sutras II.30 emphasize that ahimsa is the most important and foundational yama of the five yamas. Vijnanabhiksu uses the analogy of an elephant to convey its importance, while Vyasa defines it as refraining from harming any living being at any time, emphasizing that all other yamas support and purify ahimsa.

Ahimsa is also one of the ten Yamas in Hatha Yoga according to verse 1.1.17 of its classic manual Hatha Yoga Pradipika. The significance of ahimsa as the first restraint in the first limb of Yoga (Yamas) is that it defines the necessary foundation for progress through Yoga. It is a precursor to Asana, implying that success in Yogasana can be had only if the self is purified in thought, word, and deed through the self-restraint of ahimsa.

== Buddhism ==
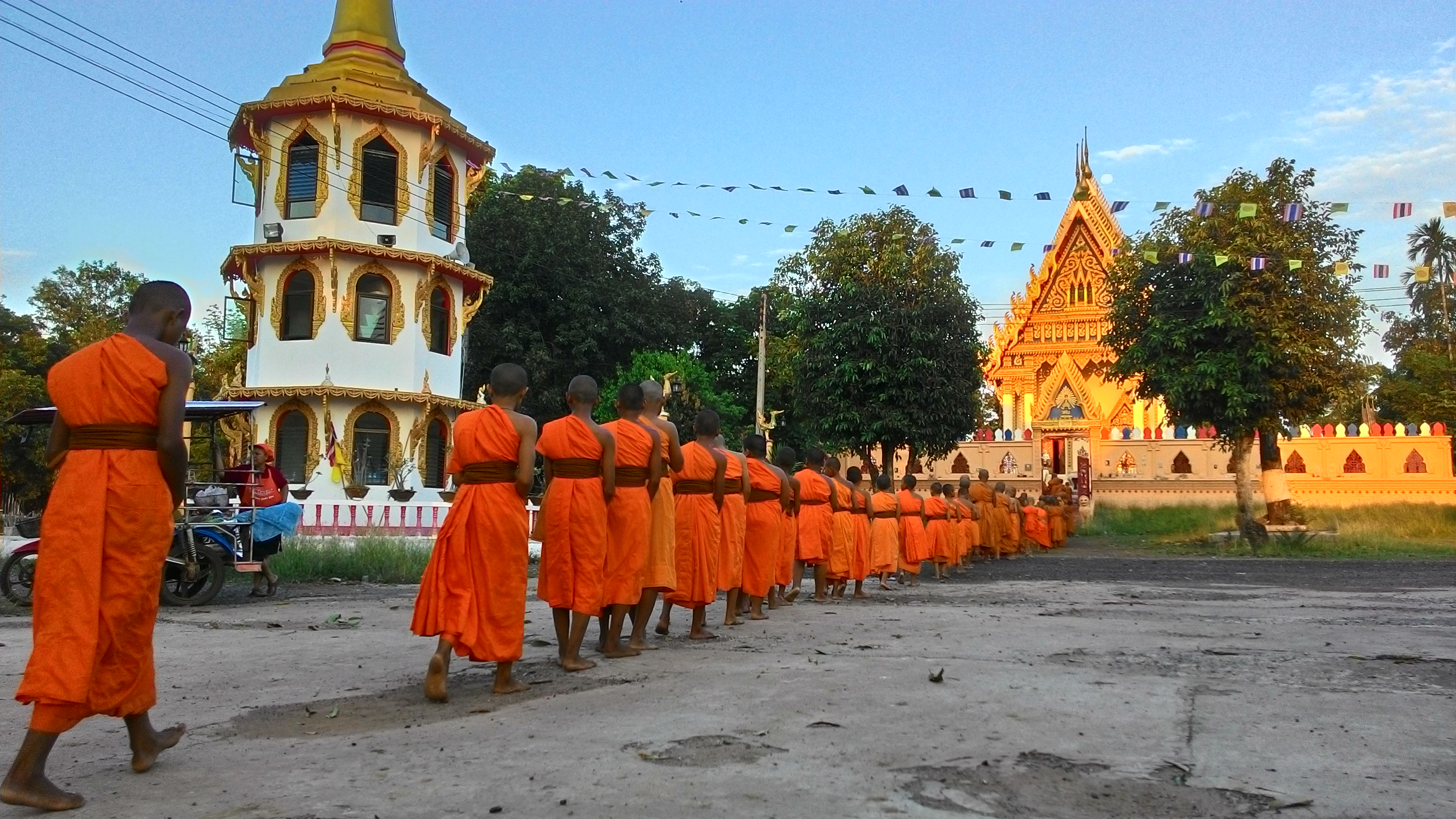
Buddhist monk peace walk

In Buddhist texts ahimsa (or its Pāli cognate avihiṃsā) is part of the Five Precepts (Pañcasīla), the first of which has been to abstain from killing. This precept of ahimsa is applicable to both the Buddhist layperson and the monastic community.

The ahimsa precept is not a commandment, and transgressions did not invite religious sanctions for laypersons, but their power has been in the Buddhist belief in karmic consequences and their impact in afterlife during rebirth. Killing, in Buddhist belief, could lead to rebirth in the hellish realm, and for a longer time in more severe conditions if the murder victim was a monk. Saving animals from slaughter for meat is believed to be a way to acquire merit for better rebirth. These moral precepts have been voluntarily self-enforced in lay Buddhist culture through the associated belief in karma and rebirth. Buddhist texts not only recommend ahimsa, but suggest avoiding trading goods that contribute to or are a result of violence:

These five trades, O monks, should not be taken up by a lay follower: trading with weapons, trading in living beings, trading in meat, trading in intoxicants, trading in poisons.

— Anguttara Nikaya V.177, Translated by Martine Batchelor

Unlike with lay Buddhists, transgressions by monks do invite sanctions. Full expulsion of a monk from sangha follows instances of killing, just like any other serious offense against the monastic nikaya code of conduct.

=== War ===
Violent ways of punishing criminals and prisoners of war were not explicitly condemned in Buddhism, but peaceful ways of conflict resolution and punishment with the least amount of injury were encouraged. The early texts condemn the mental states that lead to violent behavior.

Nonviolence is an overarching theme within the Pāli Canon. While the early texts condemn killing in the strongest terms, and portray the ideal ruler as a pacifist, such a ruler is nonetheless flanked by an army. It seems that the Buddha's teaching on nonviolence was not interpreted or put into practice in an uncompromisingly pacifist or anti-military service way by early Buddhists. The early texts assume war to be a fact of life, and well-skilled soldiers are viewed as necessary for defensive warfare. In Pali texts, injunctions to abstain from violence and involvement with military affairs are directed at members of the sangha; later Mahayana texts, which often generalise monastic norms to laity, require this of lay people as well.

The early texts do not contain just-war ideology as such. Some argue that a sutta in the Gamani Samyuttam rules out all military service. In this passage, a soldier asks the Buddha if it is true that, as he has been told, soldiers slain in battle are reborn in a heavenly realm. The Buddha reluctantly replies that if he is killed in battle while his mind is seized with the intention to kill, he will undergo an unpleasant rebirth. In the early texts, a person's mental state at the time of death is generally viewed as having a great impact on the next birth.

Some Buddhists point to other early texts as justifying defensive war. One example is the Kosala Samyutta, in which King Pasenadi of Kosala, a righteous king favored by the Buddha, learns of an impending attack on his kingdom. He arms himself in defence, and leads his army into battle to protect his kingdom from attack. He lost this battle but won the war. King Pasenadi eventually defeated Emperor Ajātasattu and captured him alive. He thought that, although this King of Magadha has transgressed against his kingdom, he had not transgressed against him personally, and Ajātasattu was still his nephew. He released Ajātasattu and did not harm him. Upon his return, the Buddha said (among other things) that Pasenadi "is a friend of virtue, acquainted with virtue, intimate with virtue", while the opposite is said of the aggressor, King Ajātasattu.

According to Theravada commentaries, there are five requisite factors that must all be fulfilled for an act to be both an act of killing and to be karmically negative. These are: (1) the presence of a living being, human or animal; (2) the knowledge that the being is a living being; (3) the intent to kill; (4) the act of killing by some means; and (5) the resulting death. Some Buddhists have argued on this basis that the act of killing is complicated, and its ethicality is predicated upon intent. Some have argued that in defensive postures, for example, the primary intention of a soldier is not to kill, but to defend against aggression, and the act of killing in that situation would have minimal negative karmic repercussions.

According to Babasaheb Ambedkar, there is circumstantial evidence encouraging ahimsa from the Buddha's doctrine, "Love all, so that you may not wish to kill any." Gautama Buddha distinguished between a principle and a rule. He did not make ahimsa a matter of rule, but suggested it as a matter of principle. This gives Buddhists freedom to act.

=== Laws ===
Maurya Emperor Ashoka banned animal sacrifice, hunting, slaughter of "all four-footed creatures that are neither useful nor edible" and specific animal species, female goats, sheep and pigs nursing their young as well as their young up to the age of six months. Fishing was banned during Chaturmasya and Uposatha. Slave trade in the Maurya Empire was also banned by Ashoka.

The emperors of the Sui dynasty, Tang dynasty, and early Song dynasty banned killing in the Lunar calendar's 1st, 5th, and 9th months. Empress Wu Tse-Tien banned killing for more than half a year in 692. Some rulers banned fishing for a period of time each year.

There were also bans after the death of emperors, after Buddhist and Taoist prayers, and after natural disasters such as Shanghai's 1926 summer drought, as well as an eight-day ban beginning August 12, 1959, after the August 7 flood (Chinese: 八七水災; pinyin: Bāqī shuǐzāi), the last big flood before the 88 Taiwan Flood.

People avoid killing during some festivals, like the Taoist Ghost Festival, the Nine Emperor Gods Festival, and the Vegetarian Festival, as well as during others.

== See also ==
- Anekantavada – Jain doctrine of many-sidedness
- Animal rights – Rights belonging to animals
- Civil resistance – Political action that relies on the use of non-violent methods by civil groups
- Consistent life ethic – Ethic opposing loss of life
- Eight precepts – Buddhist code of conduct observed during Uposatha days and festivals
- Ethics – Philosophical study of morality
- Five precepts – Basic code of ethics for Buddhist laity
- Gandhism – Body of ideas inspired by Mahatma Gandhi
- Golden Rule – Principle of treating others reciprocally
- History of vegetarianism
- Human rights – Fundamental rights belonging to all humans
- Karuṇā – Sanskrit term translated as empathy, compassion or mercy
- Non-aggression Principle – Core concept in libertarianism
- Nonkilling – Approach to nonviolence
- Nonresistance – Nonviolent philosophy
- Nonviolence – Principle or practice of not causing harm to others
- Pacifism – Philosophy opposing war or violence
- Satyagraha – Form of nonviolent or civil resistance
- Veganism – Non-usage of animal products
- Vegetarianism and religion – Religious practices involving not eating meat
- Yamas – Ethical rules in Hinduism and Yoga
