= World Summit of Nobel Peace Laureates =

International conference

- Coat of arms
- Official organization Permanent Secretariat of Nobel Peace Laureates
- Headquarters: Piacenza,^{a} Italy; Moscow,^{b} Russia
- Official languages: 7 languages: Arabic; Chinese; English; French; Russian; Spanish; Polish
- Correspondents: 6 states: Ghana; Italy; Japan; Poland; Russia; South Africa

Leaders
  - President: Ekaterina Zagladina
  - Vice President: Marzio Dallagiovanna
  - Vice President: Ayami Gensei Ito
- Website nobelpeacesummit.com
- 1. Galleria Piazza Cavalli 7b, 29121, Piacenza; 2. Bldg 14, 39 Leningradsky Prospect, Moscow 125167.

The World Summit of Nobel Peace Laureates was initiated by Mikhail Gorbachev in the 1990s, as a forum in which the Nobel Peace Laureates and the Peace Laureate Organizations could come together to address global issues with a view to encourage and support peace and human well-being in the world. Its Permanent Secretariat is an independent, non-profit, ECOSOC non-governmental organization, based in Piacenza, operating on a permanent basis. A permanent staff, mainly composed of volunteers, promotes the work of the Nobel Peace Prize Winners and organizes the World Summit of Nobel Peace Laureates on a yearly basis. To date, the Permanent Secretariat has organized 19 Summits, the most recent having been held in September 2024 in Monterrey, Mexico

== List of World Summits ==
	Date	Host country	Host city	Participants
19th	18-20 September 2024	Mexico	Monterrey	Óscar Arias, Shirin Ebadi, José Ramos-Horta, Tawakkol Karman, Lech Wałęsa, Kailash Satyarthi, Rigoberta Menchú, Leymah Gbowee, Abdessattar Ben Moussa, Mohamed Fadhel Mahfoud, Houcine Abassi, Wided Bouchamaoui, International Physicians for the Prevention of Nuclear War, Ruth Mitchell, Jans Fromow-Guerra, International Campaign to Abolish Nuclear Weapons, Ira Helfand, American Friends Service Committee, Joyce Ajlouny, Intergovernmental Panel on Climate Change, Hoesung Lee, Tunisian National Dialogue Quartet, United Nations Development Coordinations Office
18th	12-14 December 2022	South Korea	Pyongchang	Shirin Ebadi, Leymah Gbowee, Tawakkol Karman, Kailash Satyarthi, Ouided Bouchamaoui, Ruth Mitchell, International Physicians for the Prevention of Nuclear War, Tetsujiro Suzuki, Pugwash Conferences on Science and World Affairs, Ira Helfand, International Campaign to Abolish Nuclear Weapons, David Steward, FW de Klerk Foundation, Joy Ngoma, Desmond and Leah Tutu Legacy Foundation
17th	19–22 September 2019	Mexico	Mérida	Frederik Willem De Klerk, Juan Manuel Santos, Lech Wałęsa, Shirin Ebadi, Tawakkol Karman, David Trimble, Jody Williams, Leymah Gbowee, Kailash Satyarthi, Rigoberta Menchú Tum, José Manuel Barroso, Tebogo Joy Ngoma, International Committee of the Red Cross, American Friends Service Committee, Tunisian National Dialogue Quartet, Martin Luther King Centre, Albert Schweitzer Institute, Desmond Tutu Peace Centre, Grameen Creative Lab, Nelson Mandela Foundation, Institute of International Law, ICAN, Amnesty International, European Commission, International Campaign to Ban Landmines, International Labour Organization, International Peace Bureau, International Physicians for the Prevention of Nuclear War, Pugwash Conferences on Science and World Affairs, United Nations, United Nations High Commissioner for Refugees
16th	2–5 February 2017	Colombia	Bogotá	David Trimble, Shirin Ebadi, Rigoberta Menchú, Jody Williams, Jose Ramos-Horta, Lech Wałęsa, Oscar Arias, Tawakkol Karman, Leymah Gbowee, Mohamed El Baradei, Kailash Satyarthi, American Friends Service Committee, Institute of International Law, International Peace Bureau, UNICEF, International Physicians for the Prevention of Nuclear War, Tunisian National Dialogue Quartet, Intergovernmental Panel on Climate Change, International Labour Organization, Médecins Sans Frontières, United Nations, European Union, United Nations High Commissioner for Refugees, Pugwash Conferences on Science and World Affairs, International Committee of the Red Cross
15th	13–15 November 2015	Spain	Barcelona	Oscar Arias, Frederik Willem De Klerk, Shirin Ebadi, Tawakkol Karman, Mairead Maguire, David Trimble, Lech Wałęsa, Betty Williams, Jody Williams, American Friends Service Committee, European Commission, International Campaign to Ban Landmines, International Labour Organization, Intergovernmental Panel on Climate Change, International Peace Bureau, International Physicians for the Prevention of Nuclear War, Pugwash Conferences on Science and World Affairs, United Nations, United Nations High Commissioner for Refugees
14th	12–14 December 2014	Italy	Rome	14th Dalai Lama, Shirin Ebadi, Leymah Gbowee, Tawakkol Karman, Mairead Corrigan, José Ramos-Horta, David Trimble, Betty Williams, Jody Williams, American Friends Service Committee, Amnesty International, European Union, International Campaign to Ban Landmines, International Labour Organization, Intergovernmental Panel on Climate Change, International Peace Bureau, International Physicians for the Prevention of Nuclear War, Organisation for the Prohibition of Chemical Weapons, Pugwash Conferences on Science and World Affairs, United Nations High Commissioner for Refugees, United Nations
13th	21–23 October 2013	Poland	Warsaw	Muhammad Yunus, 14th Dalai Lama, Frederik Willem de Klerk, Shirin Ebadi, Lech Wałęsa, Mairead Corrigan, Betty Williams, International Peace Bureau, American Friends Service Committee, Amnesty International, International Physicians for the Prevention of Nuclear War, Pugwash Conferences on Science and World Affairs, Intergovernmental Panel on Climate Change, United Nations, United Nations High Commissioner for Refugees, European Union
12th	23–25 April 2012	United States	Chicago	Mikhail Gorbachev, Muhammad Yunus, 14th Dalai Lama, Frederik Willem de Klerk, Jimmy Carter, Shirin Ebadi, Jody Williams, Lech Wałęsa, International Peace Bureau, American Friends Service Committee, International Committee of the Red Cross, Amnesty International, International Physicians for the Prevention of Nuclear War, Pugwash Conferences on Science and World Affairs, International Campaign to Ban Landmines, United Nations Department of Economic and Social Affairs, Intergovernmental Panel on Climate Change
11th	12–14 November 2010	Japan	Hiroshima	Mikhail Gorbachev, 14th Dalai Lama, Frederik Willem de Klerk, Lech Wałęsa, Mohamed ElBaradei, Mairead Maguire, Shirin Ebadi, Jody Williams, United Nations, United Nations High Commissioner for Refugees, International Labour Organization, International Committee of the Red Cross, International Federation of Red Cross and Red Crescent Societies, International Physicians for the Prevention of Nuclear War, Pugwash Conferences on Science and World Affairs, International Peace Bureau, American Friends Service Committee, Médecins Sans Frontières, Amnesty International
10th	9–11 November 2009	Germany	Berlin	Mikhail Gorbachev, Frederik Willem de Klerk, Lech Wałęsa, Muhammad Yunus, Mairead Maguire, Betty Williams, Ahmed Kathrada (representing Nelson Mandela), United Nations, International Committee of the Red Cross, Amnesty International, International Labour Organization, Intergovernmental Panel on Climate Change, Pugwash Conferences on Science and World Affairs, International Physicians for the Prevention of Nuclear War, American Friends Service Committee, International Peace Bureau
9th	11–13 December 2008	France	Paris	Mikhail Gorbachev, Frederik Willem de Klerk, Lech Wałęsa, John Hume, Mairead Maguire, Betty Williams, United Nations (Department of Peacekeeping Operations), United Nations High Commissioner for Refugees, Intergovernmental Panel on Climate Change, International Physicians for the Prevention of Nuclear War, International Peace Bureau, American Friends Service Committee, Pugwash Conferences on Science and World Affairs, International Red Cross and Red Crescent Movement, International Labour Organization, International Campaign to Ban Landmines, United Nations Children's Fund
8th	13–15 December 2007	Italy	Rome	Mikhail Gorbachev, 14th Dalai Lama, Mairead Maguire, Muhammad Yunus, Lech Wałęsa, Betty Williams, International Physicians for the Prevention of Nuclear War, International Peace Bureau, American Friends Service Committee, Institut de Droit International, Pugwash Conferences on Science and World Affairs, International Committee of the Red Cross, United Nations Children's Fund, United Nations, International Labour Organization, Médecins Sans Frontières, International Atomic Energy Agency, Amnesty International, United Nations High Commissioner for Refugees, International Campaign to Ban Landmines
7th	17–19 November 2006	Italy	Rome	Mikhail Gorbachev, Lech Wałęsa, Mairead Maguire, Carlos Filipe Ximenes Belo, Rita Levi-Montalcini, Juan Somavía, Jeremy Rifkin, International Atomic Energy Agency
6th	24–26 November 2005	Italy	Rome	Mikhail Gorbachev, Lech Wałęsa, Frederik Willem de Klerk, Betty Williams, Mairead Maguire, Rigoberta Menchú, Adolfo Pérez Esquivel, American Friends Service Committee, Amnesty International, International Campaign to Ban Landmines, Médecins Sans Frontières, International Physicians for the Prevention of Nuclear War, International Labour Organization, International Peace Bureau, Pugwash Conferences on Science and World Affairs, United Nations, United Nations High Commissioner for Refugees, United Nations Children's Fund
5th	10–12 November 2004	Italy	Rome	Mikhail Gorbachev, Kim Dae-jung, Lech Wałęsa, José Ramos-Horta, Betty Williams, Mairead Maguire, Rigoberta Menchú, Carlos Filipe Ximenes Belo, Adolfo Pérez Esquivel, Joseph Rotblat, American Friends Service Committee, International Campaign to Ban Landmines, United Nations Children's Fund, United Nations, United Nations High Commissioner for Refugees, Pugwash Conferences on Science and World Affairs, International Physicians for the Prevention of Nuclear War, International Labour Organization, International Peace Bureau, Institut de Droit International, Médecins Sans Frontières, Amnesty International
4th	27–30 November 2003	Italy	Rome	14th Dalai Lama, Mikhail Gorbachev, Mairead Maguire, Shimon Peres, Óscar Arias, Lech Wałęsa, Betty Williams, Jody Williams, American Friends Service Committee, Amnesty International, International Campaign to Ban Landmines, International Labour Organization, United Nations (Department of Peacekeeping Operations), United Nations Children's Fund, Institut de Droit International, Pugwash Conferences on Science and World Affairs, International Peace Bureau, International Physicians for the Prevention of Nuclear War, United Nations High Commissioner for Refugees
3rd	18–21 October 2002	Italy	Rome	Mikhail Gorbachev, Rigoberta Menchú, Adolfo Pérez Esquivel, Joseph Rotblat, Lech Wałęsa, Betty Williams, Institut de Droit International, International Peace Bureau, American Friends Service Committee, United Nations High Commissioner for Refugees, International Labour Organization, United Nations (Department of Peacekeeping Operations), International Physicians for the Prevention of Nuclear War, Pugwash Conferences on Science and World Affairs, International Campaign to Ban Landmines, Médecins Sans Frontières, Amnesty International
2nd	11–12 November 2000	Italy	Rome	Mikhail Gorbachev, Lech Wałęsa, Joseph Rotblat, Betty Williams, Adolfo Pérez Esquivel, International Labour Organization, International Committee of the Red Cross, International Peace Bureau, Médecins Sans Frontières, United Nations High Commissioner for Refugees, American Friends Service Committee, Amnesty International, Institut de Droit International, International Physicians for the Prevention of Nuclear War, International Campaign to Ban Landmines, United Nations Children's Fund
1st	21–22 April 1999	Italy	Rome	Mikhail Gorbachev, Rigoberta Menchú, Frederik Willem de Klerk, Shimon Peres, Joseph Rotblat, Betty Williams, David Trimble

== Peace Summit Award ==
Every year, during the World Summit of Nobel Peace Laureates, the Nobel laureates honour with the Peace Summit Award the men or women of peace chosen from personalities from the world of culture and entertainment who have stood up for human rights and for the spread of the principles of Peace and Solidarity in the world and have made an outstanding contribution to international social justice and peace. Before 2006, it was known as the Man of Peace Award.

- 2002 Roberto Benigni
- 2003 Italian National Singers’ Football Team
- 2004 Cat Stevens
- 2005 Bob Geldof and PeaceJam
- 2006 Peter Gabriel
- 2007 Don Cheadle and George Clooney
- 2008 Bono
- 2009 Annie Lennox
- 2010 Roberto Baggio
- 2012 Sean Penn
- 2013 Sharon Stone
- 2014 Bernardo Bertolucci
- 2015 René Pérez Joglar "Residente"
- 2017 Richard Branson
- 2019 Ricky Martin

== Peace Summit Medal for Social Activism ==
- 2012 Michaela Mycroft
- 2013 Jurek Owsiak
- 2014 Tareke Brhane
- 2015 Arcadi Oliveres
- 2017 Kerry Kennedy

== Peace Summit Medal for Social Impact ==
- 2017 Leyner Palacios Asprilla

== Youth Program ==
With the objective of fostering a culture of peace for future generations in Latin America and the Caribbean, the Secretariat is seeking to develop an educational campaign entitled "Peace is Possible". Characteristics are as follows:
Flagship campaign: "La Paz es Posible"
Scope: Youth (15–24 years old) of Latin America and the Caribbean
Main Objective: To educate youth about the legacy of the Nobel Peace Laureates and Peace laureate organizations and to foster leadership for peace among youth.
Approach: Inspirational and knowledge sharing – By bringing to life the struggles and stories of each of the laureates, the campaign seeks to inspire youth with the examples of courage and non-violence set by the laureates with a message of hope and possibility. Also, by introducing the work of the laureate organizations and the backgrounds of each of the laureates, the campaign will share knowledge about institutional mandates, and the geo-political contexts in which peace has thrived.

== See also ==
- Nobel Peace Prize
- Nobel Prize
- Paolo Petrocelli
