= Wided Bouchamaoui =

Tunisian businesswoman

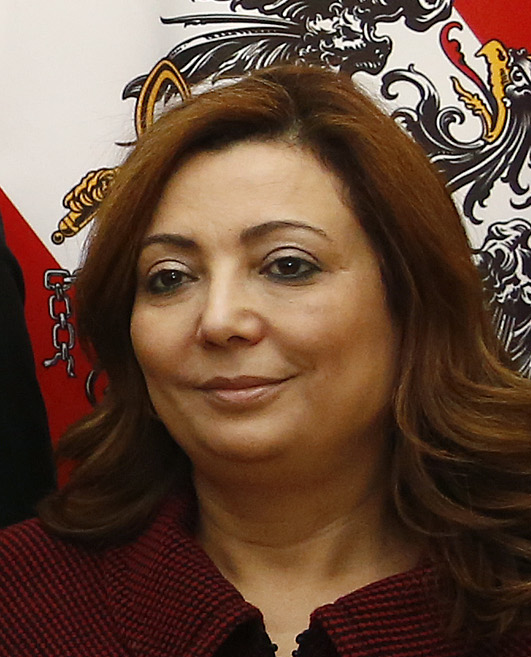
- Wided Bouchamaoui in 2016
- Born: 1961 (age 64–65)
- Occupation: Businesswoman
- Parent: Hédi Bouchamaoui
- Relatives: Tarek Bouchamaoui (brother)

Wided Bouchamaoui, also transcribed Ouided Bouchamaoui, (Arabic: وداد بوشماوي; born 1961) is a Tunisian businesswoman who since 2011 has been leader of the Tunisian Confederation of Industry, Trade and Handicrafts (UTICA). From 2013, she led the organization in its participation in the Tunisian National Dialogue Quartet, which resulted in the organization being awarded the 2015 Nobel Peace Prize. The French news magazine Jeune Afrique has identified her as one of the Top 25 Business Women in Africa. In 2014 she won the Oslo Business for Peace Award for her work in UTICA where she championed constructive dialogue between business, labor, and government during a period of national transition.

Effective April 1, 2024, she took up the appointment as Professor of Practice in Diplomacy and Conflict Resolution at New York University Abu Dhabi.

== Career ==
Wided Bouchamaoui was born into a wealthy business family. Her grandfather, Ahmed, founded a civil engineering company that laid the foundation for the family's entrepreneurial legacy. Her father later expanded part of the enterprise into Hédi Bouchamaoui & Sons, a diversified firm active in oil, textile and other industry. After earning a DESS degree in international trade and marketing, Wided gained early experience working in her father's company before establishing her own venture, which grew to employ around 200 people and specialized in cotton production.

Following the Tunisian revolution in 2011, Bouchamaoui became leader of the Tunisian Confederation of Industry, Trade and Handicrafts (UTICA), an employers union. In September 2013 she co-formed the Tunisian National Dialogue Quartet, whose aim was to secure a transition to democracy. The group included Bouchamaoui as President of UTICA, Houcine Abassi as the Secretary General of the Tunisian General Labour Union (UGTT), Abdessattar ben Moussa as the President of the Tunisian Human Rights League (LTDH), and Mohamed Fadhel Mahmoud as the president of the Tunisian Order of Lawyers. The group was disestablished in December 2014 after the 2014 Tunisian parliamentary election took place in October.

The Quartet was awarded the 2015 Nobel Peace Prize "for its decisive contribution to the building of a pluralistic democracy in Tunisia in the wake of the Jasmine Revolution of 2011". Along with other leaders of the Quartet, Houcine Abassi, Mohammed Fadhel Mafoudh and Abdessatar Ben Moussa, Bouchamaoui traveled to Oslo to collect the Nobel Prize on December 10, 2015. Bouchamaoui emphasized the collaborative nature of the group's activities, and the importance of encouraging people: "We are here to give hope to young people in Tunisia, that if we believe in our country, we can succeed." The committee's decision has been described as "rewarding hope rather than a finished product".

Since April 1, 2024, Bouchamaoui has held the position of Professor of Practice of Diplomacy and Conflict Resolution at New York University Abu Dhabi. 2024.

== Personal life ==
She has two sons.

== Awards ==
- Nobel Peace Prize 2015
- G8 Deauville Partnership Women in Business Award (2013)
- Oslo Business for Peace Award (2014)
- Golden Aegis of the Arab Organization of Civil Liberty (2015)
- Grand Officer of the Order of the Republic of Tunisia (2015)
- Commander of the Legion of Honour of France (2015)
- Jeane J. Kirkpatrick Award (2016)
- Honorary Degree from Paris Dauphine University (2017)
- International Award of Excellence "Farmasi" (2018)
