= Mokhtar Trifi =

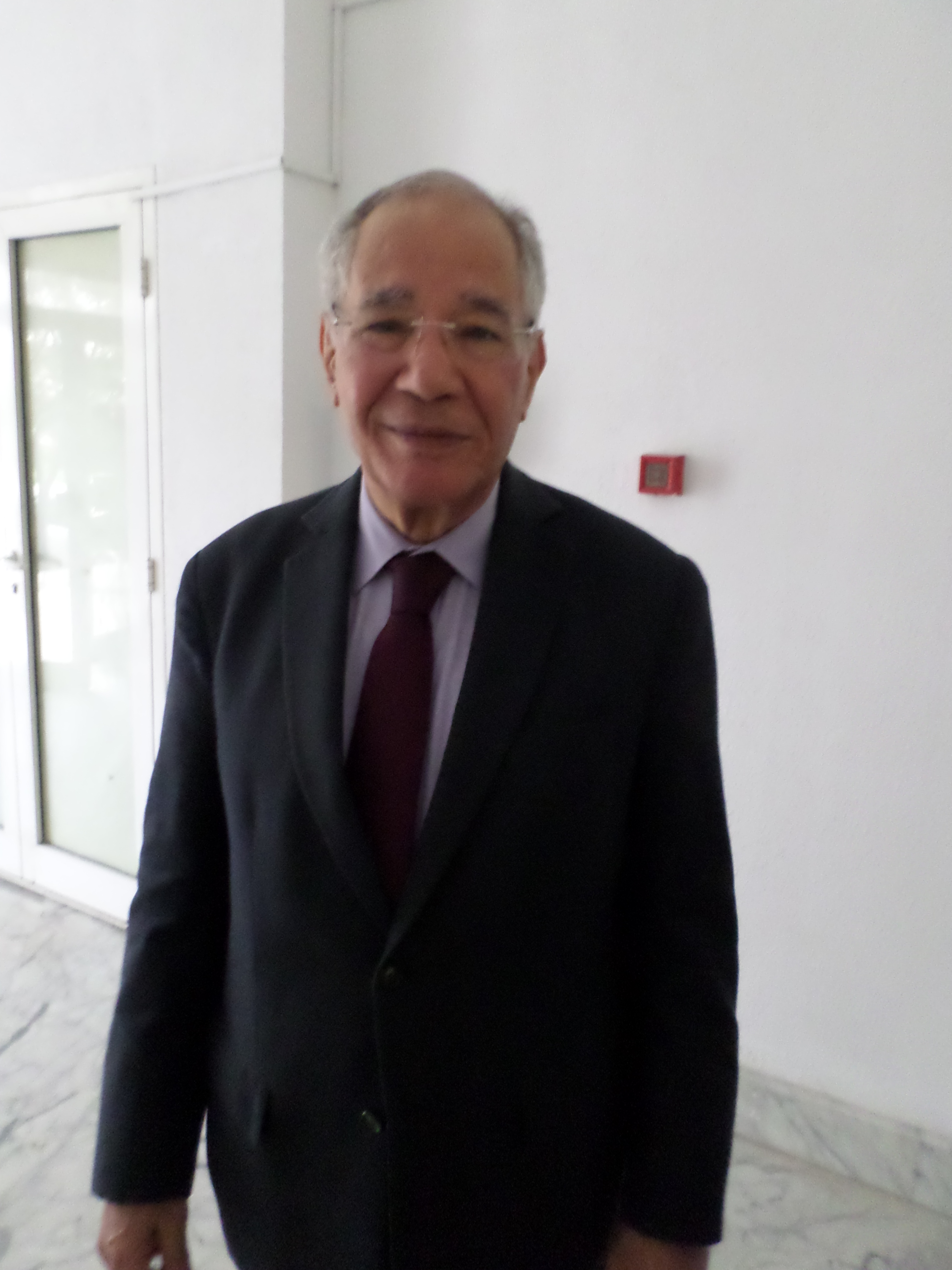
- Mokhtar Trifi (2018)

President of Tunisian Human Rights League, (2000–2011)

Personal details
- Born: 1950 (age 75–76) Hajeb El Ayoun (Tunisia)
- Occupation: Lawyer
- Profession: Human right activist politician

Mokhtar Trifi (Arabic: مختار الطريفي), born in 1950 in Hajeb El Ayoun near Kairouan, is a Tunisian lawyer. From 2000 to 2011, he chaired the Tunisian Human Rights League.

== Biography ==
=== Education and activities ===
Mokhtar Trifi was born in the rural municipality of Hajeb El Ayoun in 1950. He was from a wealthy farmer's family, so as a child he did not have to participate in farm work. Instead he and his brothers lived with their uncle to attend school.

His grandfather, who was a vigorous nationalist, had to go underground to escape the La Main Rouge. Mokhtar followed his education and entered Kairouan High School. After graduating he began to study law at the Tunis campus. He participated in many student meetings, that led to his arrest in November 1973. After completing his military service, he could not resume his studies for he had been dismissed from all Tunisian universities because of its commitment to the General Union of Tunisian Students. Mokhtar Trifi's professional career began in the field of journalism. In 1976, he was a freelancer in the daily Assabah which he returned in 1982 on the grounds of his serious activity. He then became the editor of the newspaper Le Maghreb and the weekly Al Mawkif but "the difficulties of publication made him move away from journalism".

Mokhtar Trifi could, eventually, finish his studies and became a lawyer. He thus led to defend trade unionists or opponents, left or Islamists, in the government of Zine el-Abidine Ben Ali.

== Leaders of Tunisian League of Human Rights ==
At the 5th Congress of the Tunisian League of Human Rights (LTDH), in October 2000 Mokhtar Trifi was elected president of the league. This was after twenty years of investment in this association. He wins against Fadhel Ghedamsi that the power in place hoped to see devoted.

As president of the LTDH he is "led to denounce systematically trials and human rights violations".

In 2011, after the fall of Ben Ali, Trifi attended the inauguration of the place Mohamed-Bouazizi in Paris by the mayor of the city, Bertrand Delanoë. He criticized the position of France during the Tunisian revolution, recalling the state visit of Nicolas Sarkozy in 2008.

At the Sixth Congress of the LTDH, 23 September 2011, Trifi did not stand, Abdessattar Ben Moussa was elected as the president. Mokhtar Trifi became Honorary President of the LTDH.

=== After 2011 ===
In 2013, Mokhtar Trifi was part of the defense group in charge of the Chokri Belaid case, the lawyer and Tunisian politician whose murder on 6 February of that year, caused a serious government crisis. He claimed that the Ministry of the Interior has concealed that the kind of weapon used for the assassination is only used by members of the national security. After the resignation of the Ali Laarayedh Cabinet, Mokhtar Trifi was one of the candidates with Chawki Tabib, suggested by the Popular Front for the post of head of government On 22 January 2014, he became president of the office of the International Federation for Human Rights.

On 26 November 2016 he was elected as the vice president of the World Organisation Against Torture, along with Dick Marty, who was also vice president, and Hina Jilani the new president succeeding Yves Berthelot.

== Awards ==
Mokhtar Trifi was among the Tunisian delegation who won the 2015 Nobel Peace Prize. Commander of the Order of the Republic (Tunisia);

Second class of the Tunisian Order of Merit (2018),;

Henri La Fontaine Award (2018).
