= Fliss =

Surname list

Fliss is a surname. Notable people with the surname include:

- Biff Fliss (1928–2013), Canadian football player
- Mohamed Salah Fliss (born 1946), Tunisian politician
- Raphael Michael Fliss (1930–2015), American Roman Catholic prelate
