= Tunisian Confederation of Industry, Trade and Handicrafts =

Tunisian Union of Industry, Trade and Handicrafts
- French: Union tunisienne de l'industrie, du commerce et de l'artisanat Arabic: الاتحاد التونسي للصناعة والتجارة والصناعات التقليدية
- Formation: 1947
- Type: Employers' association
- Region served: Tunisia
- President: Samir Majoul
- Affiliations: Tunisian National Dialogue Quartet
- Staff: more than 25,000
- Website: www.utica.org.tn (in French)

Tunisian Union of Industry, Trade and Handicrafts (French: Union tunisienne de l'industrie, du commerce et de l'artisanat, Arabic: الاتحاد التونسي للصناعة والتجارة والصناعات التقليدية) or UTICA is an employers' organization in Tunisia representing industrial, trade and craft sectors. On October 9, 2015, the National Dialogue Quartet, comprising UTICA, the Tunisian General Labour Union, the Tunisian Human Rights League and the Tunisian Order of Lawyers, was announced as the laureate of the 2015 Nobel Peace Prize "for its decisive contribution to the building of a pluralistic democracy in Tunisia in the wake of the Jasmine Revolution of 2011".

== Organization ==
Formed in 1947, UTICA represents nearly 150,000 private companies in Tunisia from all sectors, with the exceptions of tourism, banking, and financial sectors. Most of these companies consists of small and medium enterprises. The confederation has more than 25,000 union officials.

Led by special committees, it supports, coordinates and mobilizes its members in regional and professional structures. It constitutes an important player integration and economic development, while supporting the activities and business development both regionally and in national and international markets.

The structural organization of UTICA gives it both a sectoral representativeness, through the federations and national trade associations but also geographic proximity, thanks to regional and local unions.

17 sector federations, 24 regional unions, 216 local unions, trade associations and 370 national trade associations and 1700 regional trade union rooms allow the organization to cover all economic sectors of the country.

== Presidents ==
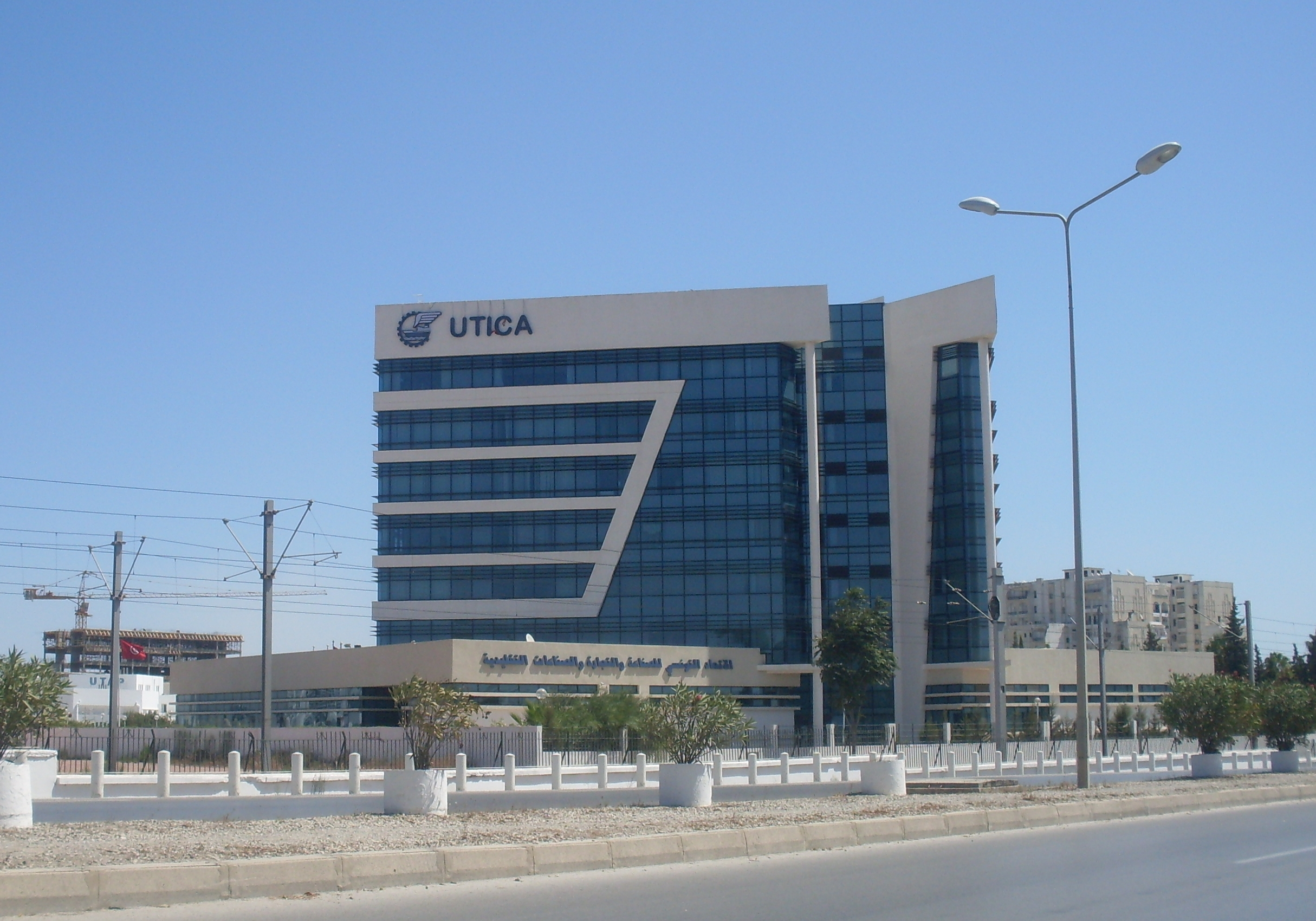
UTICA headquarters in Tunisia

- Mohamed Chamem: January 1947–April 1948
- Mohamed Ben Abdelkader: April 1948–October 1960
- Ferjani Bel Haj Ammar: October 1960–July 1988
- Hédi Djilani: July 1988–January 2011
- Mohamed Ben Sedrine (General Coordinator): January–March 2011
- Hammadi Ben Sedrine: March–May 2011
- Wided Bouchamaoui: May 2011

Hedi Jilani is the stepfather of Belhassen Trabelsi, brother of President Zine El Abidine Ben Ali, (1987–2011) and Sofiane Ben Ali, nephew of the latter and son of his brother Habib. He resigned in the wake of the revolution.
