= Business for Peace =

The Business for Peace Foundation
- Founded: April 2007
- Founder: Per Leif Saxegaard
- Type: Non-profit; NGO
- Location: Oslo, Norway
- Services: Building awareness of the benefits of businessworthy conduct
- Fields: Global search for Honourees, supporting related research, presentation of award, media relations
- Key people: Marius Døcker, managing director
- Website: www.businessforpeace.org

Business for Peace Foundation (BfP) is a non-profit foundation based in Oslo, Norway. Formed in 2007 by Per Leif Saxegaard, the Foundation defines its mission as being "to recognise, inspire, and accelerate businessworthy leadership." It encourages ethical and responsible business practices that are value-driven with the goal of building trust, stability and peace worldwide. As of 2019, Marius Døcker became the Foundation's Managing Director.

Each year, the Foundation organizes the Oslo Business for Peace Summit, which concludes with the presentation of the Oslo Business for Peace Award. Since 2009, the award has been given to up to seven honourees, business leaders "whose actions and commitments are making an outstanding contribution to the promotion of ethical behavior and peace". Honourees are selected by an independent committee made up of recipients who have won either the Nobel Peace Prize or the Nobel Memorial Prize in Economic Sciences. The Oslo Business for Peace award is sometimes referred to as the "Nobel Prize of Business".

== Formation ==
The Business for Peace Foundation was founded in Oslo, Norway in 2007 by economist Per Leif Saxegaard. The Foundation organizes the yearly Oslo Business for Peace Summit. In 2009, the Oslo Business for Peace Summit first presented the Oslo Business for Peace Award.

In 2013, the Business for Peace Foundation partnered with the United Nations' Business for Peace (B4P) initiative, sponsored by United Nations Secretary-General Ban Ki-Moon. The UN initiative has supported international efforts such as the UN Global Compact Ten Principles for achieving peace and the Sustainable Development Goals (SDGs).

Former secretary-general of the United Nations Kofi A. Annan has stated that "It is important to inspire and encourage businesspersons to be conscious of the role they can play as individuals to foster stability and peace. I think the idea behind the Oslo Business for Peace Award, and the potential impact it may have, is inspiring".

== Being Business-worthy ==
The Business for Peace Foundation encourages the private sector to follow responsible business practices. The Business for Peace Foundation promotes the concept of being "business-worthy", "ethically creating economic value that also creates value for society." Such an approach seeks to raise business practices from short-term win-lose dynamics to fulfilling longer-term win-win business aims and building trust between the stakeholders and communities involved.

Saxegaard has said that he finds inspiration in this quote from Adam Smith:

Markets could not flourish without a strong underlying moral culture, animated by empathy and fellow-feeling, by our ability to understand our common bond as human beings, and to recognize the needs of others.

Business-worthy leaders are expected to serve as models to society who will inspire other decision makers to direct their business activities in accordance with business-worthy principles. Business for Peace honourees have been studied to better understand their ethical leadership qualities and their potential role as drivers of change in peacemaking, peacekeeping, and peacebuilding. They tend to follow ethical business practices such as (1) emphasizing shareholder returns for the promotion of jobs, economic development, and reductions in poverty (2) following the rule of law, avoiding corruption, recognizing contract and property rights, and engaging in dispute resolution; and (3) building community both externally as socially responsible corporate citizens, and internally through employee engagement, employee rights, and gender equity.

== The Oslo Business for Peace Summit ==
Starting in May 2007, the Oslo Business for Peace Summit has been held annually in the Oslo City Hall.

=== Summit Themes ===
- 2007 - Peace and Stability through Trade
- 2008 - Globalisation: the good, the bad and the ugly
- 2009 - The World in Recession, a call for a more ethically aware capitalism? At the 2009 Summit, the Natural Resource Charter was presented.
- 2010 - Peace Through Trade: New Times
- 2011 - Business as an Instrument of Peace - Research Symposium in Oslo, in collaboration with the USIP, the Norwegian Ministry of Foreign Affairs and the Peace Research Institute Oslo
- 2012 - The Essences of Trust in Business Today
- 2013 - Business in Fragile Environments
- 2014 - The New Imperative: Creating Shared Value
- 2015 - How Can Sustainability be a Driver of Value Creation?
- 2016 - Moving Towards the Global Goals: Business as a Problem Solver
- 2017 - Brundtland +30: Breakthrough Ideas for Future-proofing the Global Economy
- 2018 - Building Trust: Accelerating Climate Leadership
- 2019 - Navigating in a World of Imbalance
- 2020 - In 2020, 24 Business for Peace Award honourees from 21 countries signed an open letter, encouraging businesses to rebuild and address issues in response to the COVID-19 pandemic in the Global South.
- 2021 - Spotlight Series: Rethinking Systems of Decent Work, a three-day online event was held instead of a summit due to the COVID-19 pandemic.

A selection of speakers who have contributed to the Summits: Kjell Magne Bondevik, Alexandra, Countess of Frederiksborg, Roberto Servitje (Grupo Bimbo), Guy F. Tozzoli (World Trade Center), Vijay Kalantri (All India Association of Industries), Jan Egeland, Bob Geldof, Nabil Shaath, Anders Källström, Dr. Khater Massaad, Jinghai Zheng, John Lervik, Margaret Beckett, Erik Solheim, Festus G. Mogae, Kandeh Yumkella, Jeremy Rifkin, Anthony J. Venables, Gobind Nankani, Petter Nore, Long Yongtu, Timothy L. Fort, Patricia Aburdene, Juan Carlos Echeverry, Børge Brende, Henrik Syse and Erna Solberg.

== The Oslo Business for Peace Award ==
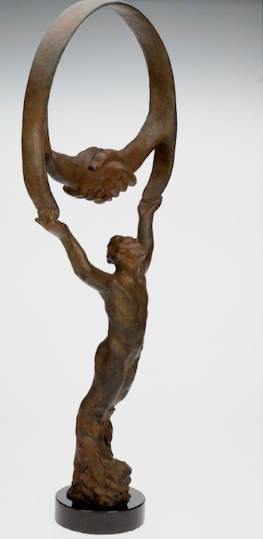
Oslo Business for Peace Award

The statue "the Just Man" has been created by the artist Bruce Naigles. It is presented to the Business for Peace Honourees during the formal award ceremony at Oslo City Hall.

=== The Nomination Process ===
The Business for Peace Foundation works together with nominating partners to identify candidates who embody the values described by the criteria for the Oslo Business for Peace Award. Beginning in 2009, the Foundation has formally collaborated with the International Chamber of Commerce. Other partnerships include Principles for Responsible Investment, the United Nations Development Programme and the United Nations Global Compact.

=== The Award Committee ===
Following closure of the nomination period, the honourees are chosen by an independent committee selected from people who have received either the Nobel Peace Prize or the Nobel Memorial Prize in Economic Sciences. Members of the award committee have included businesswoman Ouided Bouchamaoui (2016–), peace activist Leymah Gbowee (2014–), professor Finn Kydland (2014–), professor Eric S. Maskin (2017–), human rights advocate and lawyer Shirin Ebadi (2014 – 2018), economist Michael Spence (2009 – 2017), professor Muhammad Yunus (2009 – 2013) and professor Wangari Maathai (2009 – 2011).

=== The Award Criteria ===
The Award Committee of the Business for Peace Foundation selects honourees who have demonstrated that it is possible for a business to enter into partnership with society, while remaining profitable and capable of longer-term growth. The Award Committee evaluates nominees according to three criteria. To be considered business-worthy, and a candidate for the award, a nominee must be:

- A role model to the general public and their peers in the business community.
- An advocate of ethical and responsible business principles, and social responsibility in corporate governance.
- Trusted by the stakeholders in the communities their businesses affects, ideally as a result of creating economic value in a way that also creates value for society.

=== Business for Peace Honourees ===
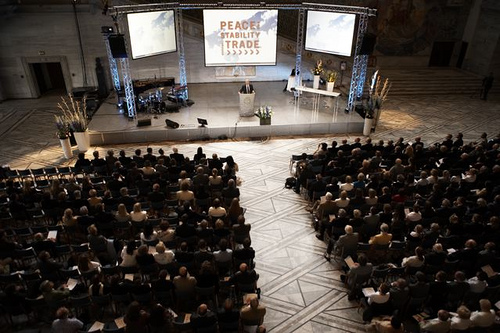
2009 Award Ceremony

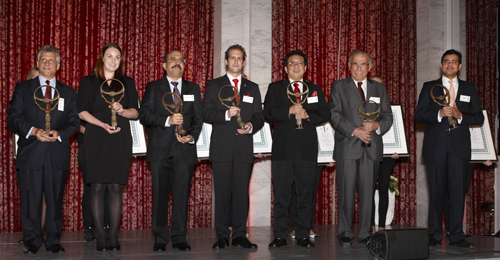
2010 Honourees

==== 2009 ====
- Anders Dahlvig, Sweden
- Mo Ibrahim, Sudan
- Jeffrey R. Immelt, United States
- Mohammed Jameel, Saudi Arabia
- Jiang Jianqing, China
- Josephine Okot, Uganda
- Zhengrong Shi, China

==== 2010 ====
- Francis Yeoh, Malaysia
- Emily Cummins, United Kingdom
- William Rosenzweig, United States
- Roberto Servitje, Mexico
- Venkataramani Srivathsan, Nigeria
- Ratan Tata, India
- Stef Wertheimer, Israel

==== 2012 ====
- Ibrahim Abouleish, Egypt
- Eduardo Eurnekian, Argentina
- Vladas Lasas, Lithuania
- David W. MacLennan, Canada
- Reginald Mengi, Tanzania
- Latifur Rahman, Bangladesh

==== 2013 ====
- Nadia Al-Sakkaf, Yemen
- Dean Cycon, United States
- Margaret Mussoi L. Groff, Brazil
- Connie Hasemann, Denmark
- Arif Naqvi, Pakistan

==== 2014 ====
- Selima Ahmad, Bangladesh
- Ouided Bouchamaoui, Tunisia
- Sir Richard Branson, United Kingdom
- Kesha Kumari Damini, Nepal
- Adnan Kassar, Lebanon
- Marilyn Carlson Nelson, United States

==== 2015 ====
- Juan Andrés Cano, Colombia
- Merrill Joseph Fernando, Sri Lanka
- Zahi Khouri, Palestine
- Poman Lo, Hong Kong, China
- Paul Polman, Netherlands

==== 2016 ====
- Sarah Beydoun, Lebanon
- Tore Lærdal, Norway
- Jennifer Nkuene Riria, Kenya

==== 2017 ====
- Durreen Shahnaz, Impact Investment Exchange (IIX), Bangladesh & Singapore
- Harley Seyedin, multi-national electricity and low carbon infrastructure development, Iran & United States
- Murad Al-Katib, sustainable agriculture and contributing to feeding millions of refugee families in the Syrian crisis, Canada
- Elon Musk, South Africa & United States

==== 2018 ====
- Lori Blaker, CEO of TTi Global, United States
- Martin Naughton KBE, Founder of GlenDimplex, Ireland
- Edgar Montenegro, Founder and CEO of Corpocampo, Colombia

==== 2019 ====
- Alice Laugher, CEO Committed to Good (CTG), England
- Hamdi Ulukaya, CEO of Chobani, Turkey & United States
- Agbor Ashumanyi Ako, co-founder of GiftedMom, Cameroon

==== 2020 ====
- James Mwangi, Group Managing Director and Group Chief Executive Officer of the Equity Group Holdings Limited, Kenya
- Marc Benioff, Founder, chairman, and CEO, Salesforce, United States
- Felicitas ‘Joji’ Bautista Pantoja, CEO and Co-Founder of Coffee for Peace, Philippines & Canada
