= Abdessattar Ben Moussa =

Tunisian lawyer

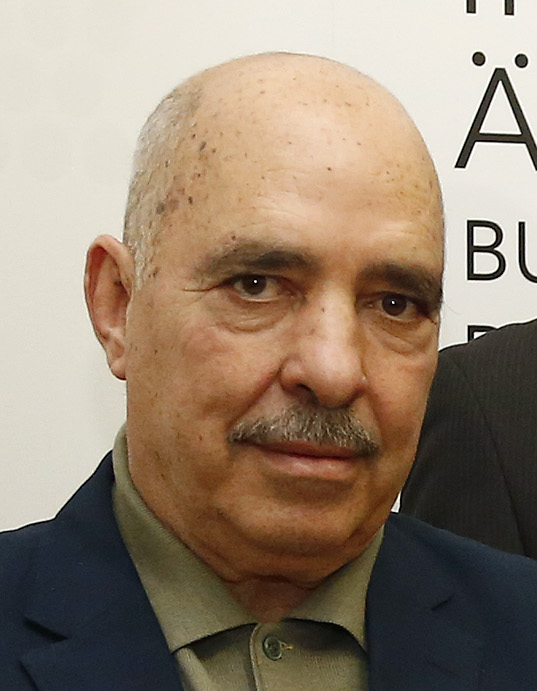
Abdessattar Ben Moussa in 2016

Abdessattar Ben Moussa (Arabic: عبد الستار بن موسى) is a Tunisian lawyer and human rights activist. He was chairman of the Tunisian Human Rights League between 2011 and 2016.

On 23 September 2011, on the final day of the sixth congress, chaired by Mohamed Salah Fliss, Ben Moussa was elected president of the league, ahead of Anouar Koussari and succeeding Mokhtar Trifi, who did not represent himself.

In 2016, Abdessattar Ben Moussa became the Ambassador of the International Union of Lawyers (for Peace).

== Biography ==
In 2009, Ben Moussa supported the candidacy of Ahmed Néjib Chebbi in the presidential elections, together with some independent personalities including the lawyer and opponent Ayachi Hammami and human rights activist Khemais Chammari.

On 17 January 2011, the "government of national unity" was formed after the revolution. Just after its formation, it lifted the ban that existed till then on the activities of the league on Tunisian soil.

The Tunisian Human Rights League is one of the branches of the national dialogue quartet that won the 2015 Nobel Peace Prize for its success in the mission that led to the holding of presidential elections and legislative elections as well as the ratification of the new Constitution in 2014.

In 2017, Ben Moussa was appointed a governmental mediator by the President of the Republic of Tunisia.

== Awards ==
Ben Moussa a was among the Tunisian delegation who won the 2015 Nobel Peace Prize.

- Superior officer of Order of the Republic (Tunisia)
- Commander of Legion of Honour ,
- Doctor of Honor of Paris Dauphine University.
- Nobel Peace Prize, On 10 December 2015 Ben Moussa and the Tunisian delegation were awarded the Nobel Peace Prize.
