= Tunisian National Dialogue Quartet =

Democracy advocates in Tunisia

- Part of the aftermath of the Jasmine Revolution
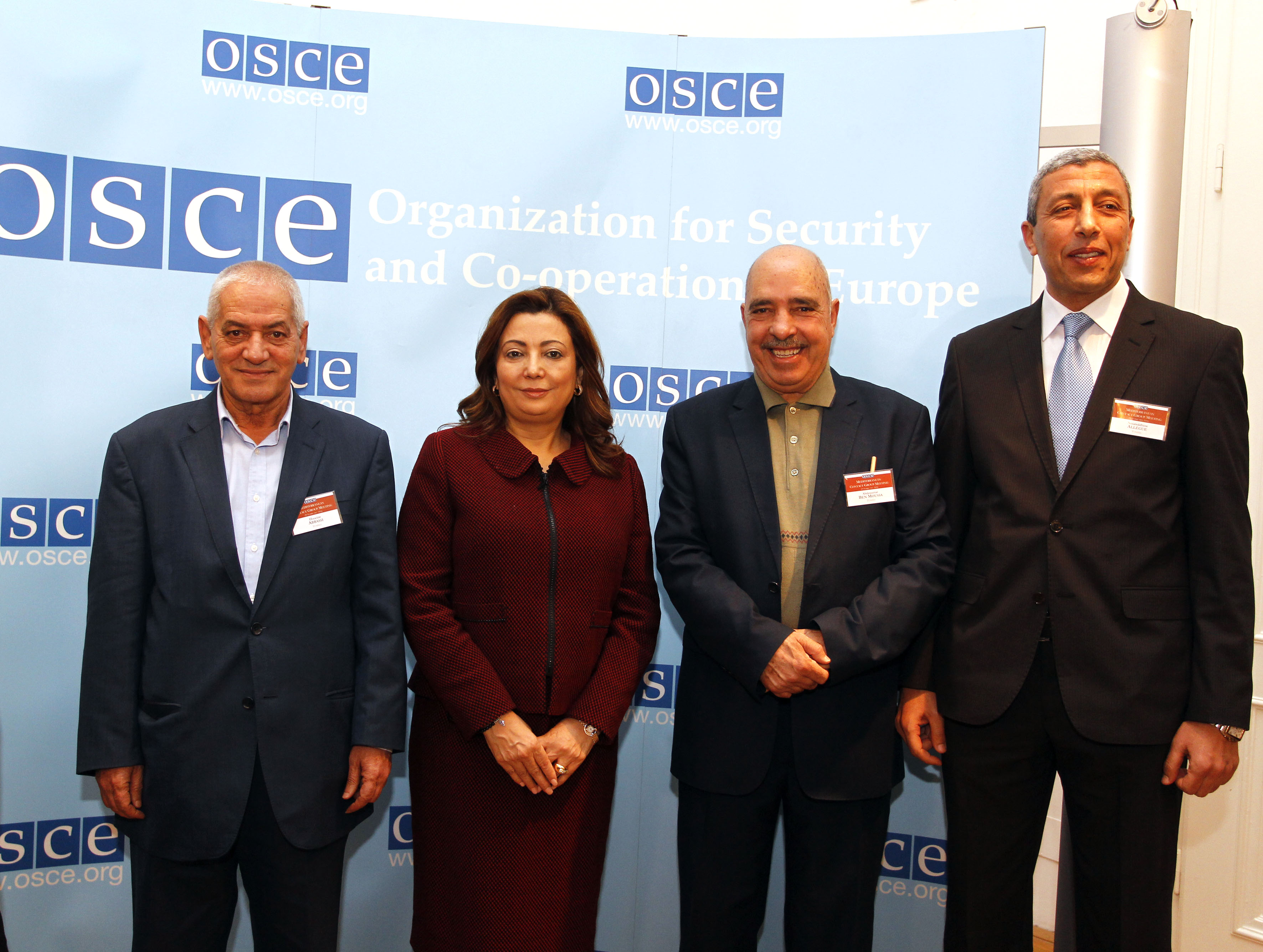
- The Tunisian National Dialogue Quartet at the OSCE in Vienna (2016). From left to right Houcine Abbassi (UGTT), Wided Bouchamaoui (UTICA), Abdessattar Ben Moussa (Tunisian Human Rights League), Noureddhine Allege (Order of Lawyers).
- Date: Formed August 2013-January 2014
- Location: Tunisia
- Goals: An end to the ongoing political violence; Imposition of an interim government; Ratification of the constitution
- Result: Technocratic government installed with Mehdi Jomaa as Acting Prime Minister.; New constitution ratified; Both presidential and legislative elections scheduled

Parties
Tunisian National Dialogue Quartet: Tunisian General Labour Union; Tunisian Order of Lawyers; UTICA; Tunisian Human Rights League	The Troika in Power: Ennahda; CPR; Ettakatol	Opposition: National Salvation Front

Lead figures
Quartet Leaders: Houcine Abassi (General Secretary of UGTT); Abdessattar Ben Moussa (President of the Tunisian Human Rights League); Fadhel Mahfoudh (President of the Tunisian Order of Lawyers); Wided Bouchamaoui (Leader of the Tunisian Confederation of Industry, Trade and Handicrafts	Leaders in Government: Rashid al-Ghannushi (Leader of Ennahda Movement); Moncef Marzouki (President of Tunisia); Ali Laarayedh (Prime Minister of Tunisia, left office January 2014); Mehdi Jomaa (Acting Prime Minister January 2014-February 2015)	Opposition Leaders Assassinated: Chokri Belaid † (Secretary-General of the Democratic Patriots' Movement); Mohamed Brahmi † (Former General Coordinator of the People's Movement)

The Tunisian National Dialogue Quartet (Arabic: الرباعي التونسي للحوار الوطني, French: Quartet du dialogue national) is a group of four civil society organizations that were central mediators in the effort to consolidate democratic gains and form a lasting constitutional settlement in Tunisia following the unrest and historic regime change of the 2011 Jasmine Revolution.^{[1]}

The quartet was formed in the summer of 2013 following a political crisis that halted the constitutional process. As a result of the Quartet's success in bringing the Ennahda-led government to see negotiations through and producing a historic constitution, on 9 October 2015, the quartet was awarded the 2015 Nobel Peace Prize.

The National Dialogue Quartet comprises the following organizations in Tunisian civil society:

- The Tunisian General Labour Union (UGTT, Union Générale Tunisienne du Travail)
- The Tunisian Confederation of Industry, Trade and Handicrafts (UTICA, Union Tunisienne de l'Industrie, du Commerce et de l'Artisanat)
- The Tunisian Human Rights League (LTDH, La Ligue Tunisienne pour la Défense des Droits de l'Homme)
- The Tunisian Order of Lawyers (Ordre National des Avocats de Tunisie)

== Tunisian civil society in context ==
Following the self-immolation of Mohamed Bouazizi in Sidi Bouzid in mid-December 2010, Tunisia was beset by proliferating protest movements. The movement was initially catalyzed by rural middle-class workers and youths in the region of Sidi Bouzid, from where Bouazizi hailed, but grew to include diverse swaths of the population.

It was never obvious that Tunisian unions would bolster protest efforts. Since independence, the Tunisian General Labor Union (UGTT) had been politically active, notably in protesting IMF-imposed cuts to subsidies, but had increasingly been repressed by the Ben Ali regime. Events such as the 1978 "Black Thursday" protest in response to consumer price hikes and wage stagnation and the 1985 protests due to further IMF cuts to subsidies and skyrocketing cost of living seemed unlikely to be replicated in Ben Ali's more repressive climate. At the height of this repressive period, the Tunisian Human Rights League had been the lone advocacy NGO formally acknowledged. According to the 2011 Arab Barometer Survey, only three percent of the sample claimed union participation in contrast to Egypt, which had 10 percent of the protesting population holding union affiliation.

Despite this, UGTT's reach had been such during the Ben Ali regime that membership exceeded 800,000 with 150 field offices across the state; identification with the union was often seen as synonymous with party opposition. Protest participation steadily increased leading up to December 2010. In 2006 and 2007 alone, 100,000 Tunisians went on strike when Prime Minister Nazif reduced all state worker pay, whereas from 1996 to 2004, no more than 50,000 protested each year.

UGTT, responding to perceived failure to mobilize workers during the 2008 Gafsa Riots, was able to successfully navigate the Tunisian Revolution to its advantage. UGTT responded to Bouazizi's self-immolation by calling a strike in Sidi Bouzid and formulating plans for strikes in outer-lying districts. Mouldi Jendoubi, deputy secretary-general of the UGTT, quickly mobilized further strike efforts and eventually called a general strike on 14 January.

Converse to the missed opportunity of 2008, UGTT had leveraged its institutional position and historical proximity to the Ben Ali regime to its advantage. The UGTT had assumed a vanguard position for the protest movement and would be a key player in any negotiations to follow.

== Background to formation ==
Despite Ben Ali's departure, the ruling Troika led by Islamist party Ennahda proved unable to strike a lasting constitutional settlement in the Constituent Assembly of Tunisia. Only having won 89 of 217 parliamentary seats, Ennahda was forced into a tripartite coalition, joining secular parties CPR and Ettakatol. However, the alliance was tenuous, and Ennahda was accused of attempting to impose an Islamist juridical order on the state. On 20 March 2012, protests were held in response to Ennahda's proposed constitutional provisions that would have codified Islam as the official religion of the state. Ennahda had also made clear that women were to be placed in a "complementary" legal position, and not deserving of formal equality. Secularists feared that this legal language would have enabled a path to the future incorporation of sharia law.

== Initial activities ==
As early as 18 June 2012, UGTT had been calling for Ennahda, Nidaa Tounes, and other relevant parties to come to the table for a convention centered around the constitution and electoral regulations. At this stage in the transition, UGTT was still largely viewed as being beholden to partisan interests, particularly opposition parties decrying Ennahda-led Islamist reform. To this end, UGTT deputy secretary Samir Cheffi had gone on national television on 30 May to assert that the organization would remain in its impartial role in seeking a settlement among all parties.

Following this, on 18 June 2012 UGTT announced a "political initiative" seeking national reconciliation. The initiative politically was troubled from its inception as Ennahda sought to exclude centrist party Nidaa Tounes from any negotiation process. In addition, the looming specter of a general strike called by UGTT should Ennahda refuse to comply did not bode well for fruitful discussion. Ennahda had historically been excluded from such unionist campaigns, with Islamist representation in the UGTT having been sparse and Islamist advocates having been silent during Tunisia's period of structural adjustment in the 1980s.

The general strike leveraged by UGTT would have mobilized at least 500,000 unionists and thereby brought the Tunisian economy grounding to a halt. It then became apparent that Ennahda and CPR would require other civil society actors to be brought in should the "political initiative" launched by UGTT amount to a more robust national reconciliation.

Following a series of internal meetings, UGTT emerged decisively to provide overtures to three distinct national civil society organizations, the Tunisian Confederation of Industry, Trade and Handicrafts, or UTICA, the Tunisian Human Rights League, and the Tunisian Order of Lawyers. In October 2012, the organizations convened, with all parties but Ennahda and CPR represented. The involvement of the Tunisian Union for Industry, or UTICA, was particularly key to the construction of the quartet as they had signed a "Social Contract" with UGTT on 14 January 2013. This contract evinced that UGTT was willing to work hand-in-hand with the historic representatives of Tunisian corporate interests — representing key employers and business interests across the state. Such unions are not without precedent in Tunisian civil society, as UTICA and UGTT had come together in 1956 in concert with Bourguiba's Neo Destour to create a broad-based appeal for the nascent government. Moreover, the inclusion of the Order of Lawyers and the Human Rights League supplied added weight to legitimating the arbitration mandate UGTT sought for the Quartet. The Human Rights League had been in close alignment with the Ben Ali regime with many Ennahda supporters working within its ranks, so its inclusion further bolstered the credentials of the Quartet.

Despite these initial political initiatives, a number of high-profile political assassinations threatened to collapse the foundation of the new regime.

== Political crisis ==
The murder of opposition leaders Chokri Belaid, leader of Watad, and Mohamed Brahmi, founder of the party Mouvement du Peuple, catalyzed a new wave of protests that threatened to halt the proceedings of the Constituent Assembly. In particular, Brahmi's assassination was viewed as a blow to the constitutional process as a number of opposition parties withdrew from the Constituent Assembly altogether. As an immediate result of Brahmi's murder, a secular opposition coalition, the National Salvation Front, organized a month-long series of protests in July 2013, culminating in calls for Ennahda to step down. A particular locus of the movement was the Bardo National Museum, where protesters gathered and broadcast calls for government resignation. Calls were made for the government to "irhal" or "leave" in Arabic, similar to calls made during the Egyptian uprising.

Ansar Sharia, an Islamist group operating primarily in Libya, was seen as responsible for the assassination of Brahmi, and the Troika correspondingly seen as not taking any retaliatory measures. The Tamarod Movement in Egypt, formed of disparate civil society and political opposition groups, seemed a natural analog to what National Salvation Front activists in Tunisia saw as the correct course of action in deposing the Islamist government. Their proximity to the Ben Ali regime and the largest corporate firms, role in organizing a number of general strikes, and institutional make-up enabled the UGTT to initiate proceedings.

== Dialogue process ==
Following the assassinations of opposition leader Belaïd in February 2013, UGTT sought to formalize the dialogue structure. However, as accusations of Ennahda's potential involvement in Belaïd's assassination continued, UGTT refused to participate in the second forum convened by Interim President Moncef Marzouki. Following this blow, the second assassination of a prominent opposition figure, that of secular leader Mohamed Brahmi on 25 July 2013 seemed to preclude any further constitutional debate or national dialogue. UGTT seized on this moment by calling a two-day general strike, and according to Ian Hartshorn, were able to mobilize around 50 percent of their membership. The seat of the Constituent Assembly, Bardo Palace, began to immediately draw in thousands of protesters. Sit-ins and explicit calls for the deposition of the Troika were not uncommon. Professor Mohamed-Salah Omri describes this protest following Brahmi's assassination as reaching a "critical mass" when Ennahda appreciated that any potential formal coalition between the Quartet and the political opposition would presage regime collapse. At this juncture, fear of an irreparable civil conflict began to spread, and on 6 August, Constituent Assembly President Moustapha Ben Jaafar halted all legislative proceedings.

Therefore, it was only through a third national dialogue convention, convened on 25 October 2013 that any lasting settlement was built. At the outset, the UGTT-led coalition made clear that they sought an apolitical government divorced from the extremism they viewed Ennahda as supplying to Tunisian national politics. In this vein, of the 24 parties invited to the National Dialogue in October 2013, 21 signed a "roadmap" outlining the general aims of the convention. They sought:

1. To appoint an interim president to see Tunisia through the reconciliation process
2. To establish regulations and a timeline for presidential and legislative elections
3. To introduce an impartial electoral commission
4. To finish, approve, and deliver the constitution to the Tunisian Constituent Assembly for ratification

As argued by Hèla Yousfi in Trade Unions and Arab Revolutions: The Tunisian Case of UGTT two "guiding principles" emerged to steer the course of the National Dialogue: that of technocratic, apolitical governance to see Tunisia through the transition, and an immediate halt to all state violence and terror threats. Following the assassinations, parties were inclined to avert totalizing political crisis by agreeing to interim governance. In particular, Houcine Abassi, Secretary-General of UGTT, was able to move the process forward at critical junctures and willing to use the elevated bargaining power of the now four-strong coalition to push political parties along the path to constitutional ratification. As reported in Helen Yousfi's work which collected various interviews from those involved in the Dialogue, Abassi was willing to "require representatives from political parties to stay in the room after the meeting if no decision had been made."

UTICA and UGTT's insistence on a "unity front" further ensured the success of the Quartet. Reflected in statements by UGTT officials and UTICA president Ouided Bouchamaoui, opening up Tunisia to foreign investment was a key development the Quartet hoped to achieve. While hardline UGTT officials did not share this view, the contingent represented in the Quartet's ability to form a historic pact with UTICA cemented the Quartet's capacity to dominate mediation.

Both legislative and presidential elections were scheduled as a result of the Dialogue process. The legislative elections saw Nidaa Tounes, the dominant party of the National Salvation Front coalition, win a plurality of seats in the Assembly of the Representatives on October 26, 2014. Additionally, on 24 November 2014, Nidaa Tounes leader Essebsi defeated Marzouki, CPR leader and willing participant in the now-dissolved Troika.

== 2015 Nobel Peace Prize ==
On 9 October 2015, the quartet was awarded the 2015 Nobel Peace Prize "for its decisive contribution to the building of a pluralistic democracy in Tunisia in the wake of the Jasmine Revolution of 2011".

Kaci Kullmann Five, chairwoman of the Nobel Committee remarked of the Quartet: "It established an alternative peaceful political process at a time when the country was on the brink of civil war." The Nobel Committee indicated its hope that Tunisia will serve as an example for other countries experiencing moments of political transition.

=== International reaction ===
- Tunisian President Beji Caid Essebsi said the award recognizes the "path of consensus" and "Tunisia has no other solution than dialogue despite ideological disagreements." Mohammed Fadhel Mafoudh, head of the Tunisian Order of Lawyers, said that the award "is the recognition of a whole process. It's a process that started so that Tunisia would have a democratic system … that respects freedoms...It's also a message to the rest of the world, to all countries, to all the people who aspire to democracy and peace..."
- U.S. President Barack Obama called the Quartet "an inspiring reminder that lasting peace and security can only be achieved when citizens are empowered to forge their own future and "that democracy is possible and necessary in North Africa and the Middle East."
- German Chancellor Angela Merkel's spokesman Steffen Seibert said that the Nobel Peace Prize is "the deserved reward for working on democracy, for sticking to the idea that a people that has shaken off dictatorship deserves something better than a new dictatorship."
- U.N. spokesman Ahmad Fawzi said to reporters in Geneva: "We need a civil society to help us to move peace processes forward."
- United Nations Secretary-General Ban Ki-moon said "this recognition belongs to all those who gave birth to the Arab Spring and are striving to safeguard the sacrifices of so many" and "this tribute highlights that lasting progress requires an inclusive process. The Arab Spring began with great hopes that were soon replaced with grave doubts. Tunisia has managed to avoid the disappointment and dashed hopes that have tragically emerged elsewhere."

In July 2025, the Quartet nominated Francesca Albanese, the UN Special Rapporteur on the occupied Palestinian territories, for the Nobel Peace Prize in recognition of her "principled stance and extraordinary reporting on violations of international humanitarian law, particularly in Gaza and the West Bank".

== International response and aid ==
The international community widely supported the transition process in Tunisia and provided economic aid through various channels. In particular, the United States and European Union provided impetus for the completion of the Dialogue process by intervening at critical junctures to ensure Ennahda's compliance by way of leveraging economic support. It became clear that IMF and World Bank support for the regime would only come by way of the Troika's resignation and further cooperation with the Dialogue process.

A number of financial efforts have been put in place to bolster the continued growth of Tunisian democracy since the Dialogue. Beyond continued USAID and EU support, Tunisia 2020, a forum that courted international and private donors from over 70 countries accrued $14 billion worth of aid to continue growing the economy, bolstering job creation, and enshrining democratic norms. Notably, the European Investment Bank and the Arab Fund for Economic and Social Development each provided loans worth 3.1 and 1.5 billion, respectively. In a 17 December 2017 interview with the United Nations, UTICA leader during the Quartet and Nobel Prize recipient, Ouided Bouchamaoui, echoed this pro-investment sentiment. Bouchamaoui urged for further liberalization to attract foreign capital:

"A number of laws need to be revised. The slow pace of the administration is discouraging investors. Foreign investors are not very motivated because they feel that existing laws are either not clear or not applied."

In the Quartet's official speech given upon receiving the Nobel Peace Prize, they similarly made calls for foreign investment into the state. They recognized that while the Quartet was able to establish frameworks for governance and electoral pluralism, the state continues to face challenges regarding youth unemployment and vocational prospects:

"...we have to create the conditions that ensure the return of the Tunisian economy to its normal state, and improve the overall climate for investment, and embark on approving the necessary repairs, with extensive consultation between the Government and the economic and social players, to preserve the interests of all groups and factions."

== Critiques of the quartet ==
While the process was widely hailed by international observers and non-governmental organizations, the actual National Dialogue was decried by more fervent unionists as betraying elements of the Tunisian working poor. In particular, the inclusion of UTICA, at a juncture when Tunisians were embattled in a fight for wage increases, seemed to certain union activists and working class as reneging on its duty to its membership.

Another critique that has often been put forth regarding the Quartet is that it enabled further foreign investment, donor aid, and international economic support at a time when Tunisia was seeking wholesale independence. When the ANC had been suspended in September 2013 and protests were widespread, often centered around Bardo palace, the IMF decided to withhold a loan package of $1.7 billion. It was only following the accession of Jomaa leading the interim government that $500 million of the loan package was provided. IMF involvement has been viewed by Tunisians as enabling foreign, technocratic control at a moment when Tunisian agency had just been achieved. Moreover, various Tunisians viewed the National Dialogue's insistence on imposing technocrats beholden to various party officials as betraying the desires of the Tunisian populace for agency in determining state governance. The IMF and World Bank have continued to herald Tunisia as a model of regime transition, and in 2016 issued an addition $2.9 billion under the Extended Fund Facility to continue bolstering the regime's efforts to cut back public debt.

Certain historians have offered critiques that despite the Quartet's ability to bring political actors to the table, the UGTT and UTICA have been unable to push for economic restructuring. Even though these unions enjoyed a privileged position during the transition, critics such as Joel Benin view the economic structure of the state as unchanged. The Foreign Investment Promotion Agency of Tunisia has largely been immune from opposition organizing. While critics acknowledge "a new public discourse," the September 2014 Invest in Tunisia Conference evinced an economic climate amenable to IMF and World Bank aid packages.

The Quartet has also been criticized for the elite, technocratic transition bodies it constructed. Certain observers have drawn comparisons between the transition bodies erected in 2011 to oversee the national elections and the bodies created for the drafting of the 2014 constitution. Like the High Authority for Realization of the Objectives of the Revolution, Political Reform and Democratic Transition formed in 2011 to consolidate democratic gains, the Quartet has been viewed as "taking control against the will of the people" through an elite-driven process.

== Institutional legacy ==
The UGTT had secured a number of key labor victories in the language of the new constitution. This was in stark contrast to the high degree of control the Ben Ali regime had exercised over civil society and the highly limited mobilization of union workers under the auspices of UGTT. In the 2014 constitution, UGTT, working within the Quartet, was able to secure the right to strike and the right to form new unions without constraints. Before the newly ratified constitution, the 1994 labor statute governing the capacity of the UGTT had precluded any strike activity that threatened vital industry. In this way, the success of the National Dialogue enabled the most labor-friendly constitution in Tunisia's history and displayed the UGTT's institutional capacity to arbitrate a national political dispute on the highest stage.

A major component of the 2014 constitution were provisions that ensured for transparency in future Tunisian governance, primarily achieved by way of Article 125 which established an anti-corruption government organ. In line with this normative shift, in June 2015 Prime Minister Habib Essid established a National Council of Social Dialogue, composed of representatives from government, UGTT, and UTICA. All three partners praised this tripartite arrangement as "the guarantee of a permanent, regular and comprehensive tripartite dialogue."

== Pacted transition ==
Political scientists have noted the high degree of involvement between civil society elites, the Troika, and the opposition during the Transition and post-uprising period. Certain observers have viewed the Dialogue an example of pacted transition.

Pacted transitions occur when a state is undergoing a period of democratic consolidation and divergent elites can agree upon a shared trajectory governed by common rules. These rules often include a pledge to avoid violence, to work within existing institutions, and to demobilize popular unrest. South Africa's early 1990s transition often serves as the paradigmatic example. While such transitions are contingent on regime type, role of the military, and pre-existing institutions, Tunisia's elite-centered Dialogue has been thought to meet the definition. Gary A. Stradiotto and Sujian Guo define constituent pacts as "a negotiating unit, comprised of incumbent and opposition groups, attempting to bargain the transition away from authoritarian rule to democracy." The National Dialogue process fits this description as both opposition parties, the ruling Troika, and civil society mediators intervened to construct a common path. Certain scholars, however, have noted stark differences with traditional conceptions of pacted transitions and the Tunisian case.

A. A. Holmes and K. Koehler argue that unlike Terry Karl's traditional formulation, continued protests and the high polarization that met Ennahda's governance is evidence that the ruling Troika did not demobilize public unrest. This is apparent in UGTT's continued threat to mobilize strikes throughout the Dialogue process, such as that in Tozeur in December 2013. In addition, Holmes and Koelher note that the assassinations of Chokri Belaid and Mohamed Brahmi, along with a massive surge in Constituent Assembly resignations from the opposition are evidence that elites often failed to find common ground on transition procedure. Polarization in Tunisia between Islamists and secularists saw a surge between 2011 and 2013, in which over 60 percent of secularists claimed to have no trust for Tunisian Islamists. Polarization became such that the National Salvation Front included in its coalition in July 2013 a Tunisian Tamarod Movement, of which its analog in Egypt was calling for President Mohamed Morsi's deposition. These events have been cited by political scientists in critiquing the labeling of the Tunisian transition as "pacted." The polarization, continuation of protest during the Quartet's process, and continued threat of elite defection all pose definitional concerns in terming it a pacted transition per Karl's formulation.

Awards and achievements
Preceded by Kailash Satyarthi; Malala Yousafzai	Laureate of the Nobel Peace Prize; 2015	Succeeded by Juan Manuel Santos
