= Iran Awakening =

Book by Shirin Ebadi

Iran Awakening: A Memoir of Revolution and Hope
- First edition (UK)
- Author: Shirin Ebadi
- Language: English
- Genre: Memoir
- Publisher: Random House
- Publication date: 2006
- Pages: 256
- ISBN: 9780307369024

Iran Awakening: A Memoir of Revolution and Hope (Persian: بیداری ایران, romanized: Bidari Iran) is a memoir written by Nobel laureate Shirin Ebadi.

In her book, Ebadi recounts her public career and reveals her private self: her faith, her experiences, and her desire to lead a traditional life, even while serving as a rebellious voice in a land where such voices are muted and even silenced by brute force. Ebadi describes her girlhood in a modest Tehran household, her education, and her early professional success as Iran's most accomplished female jurist in the mid-1970s. She speaks eloquently about the ideals of the 1979 Iranian Revolution, and of her deep disillusionment with the direction Iran has taken since.
