= The Golden Cage (memoir) =

- Author: Shirin Ebadi
- Language: Persian
- Genre: memoirs
- Publisher: Kales Press
- Publication date: 2011
- Media type: Print
- Pages: 256
- ISBN: 978-0-9798456-4-2

The Golden Cage: Three Brothers, Three Choices, One Destiny (Persian: قفس طلایی: سه برادر، سه انتخاب، یک سرنوشت, romanized: Ghafs tilayi: seh baradar, seh entekhab, yek sarnosht) is a book by Iranian human rights activist Shirin Ebadi.

== Plot ==
The book tells the story of three brothers whose lives were heavily influenced by Iranian history: the oldest, Abbas, was a soldier under the Shah; the second, Javad, was a communist activist; the younger, Ali, supported Khomeini's Islamic revolution. All of their lives will be influenced by the worst chapters of Iranian history in the 20th century, including the Iranian Revolution, the Iran-Iraq war, and the executions of political opponents.
