= Mohamed Salah Fliss =

Tunisian politician (born 1946)

Mohamed Salah Fliss (born in 1946 in Bizerte) is a Tunisian politician. He is the author of Uncle Hamda the docker (Aam Hamda attal in Arabic) which is a testimony on the prison experiences of political activists of the Tunisian left in the 1970s.

== Early life ==
Mohamed Salah Fliss was born into a family of modest social condition, living in the port city of Bizerte, north of Tunisia. His father Hamda was a stevedore on the harbors of the commercial port.

Admired by trade union leader Farhat Hached, Hamda participated in the colonial port's social movements. He took an active part in setting up obstacles obstructing the Bizert Canal during the Bizerte crisis. That was when he lost his second son Mekki.

Hamda Fliss's activism encouraged and set off the political future of Mohamed Salah Fliss.

Like most children of his generation, Mohamed Salah Fliss follows a mixed education by studying at the French school, the Franco-Arab school of Bizerte, while pursuing traditional studies in a Koranic school in the medina. Rejected by the "immoral" behavior of a teacher, he leaves Koranic school after a few years of study. He continued his studies at the high school Stephen-Pichon of Bizerte before obtaining his baccalaureate and to leave the Faculty of Arts and Humanities of Tunis. He then joined the student movement led at the time by leftist groups, in particular the Perspectives movement. In 1968, the student movement was severely repressed by the authorities. Mohamed Salah Fliss was one of the victims of this repression.

== Imprisonment ==
Membership in student activism, then leftist politics, got Mohamed Salah Fliss sent repeatedly into prison.

He was arrested with the group of Perspectivist on 4 April 1968 and was sentenced to two years in prison. He first served with his companions in the civil prison of 9-April in Tunis and then he was jailed in prison Borj Erroumi known for the harshness of the conditions of detention. Mohamed Salah was accused of the attempted plot of 1962. He was finally pardoned like the rest of the group of perspectivists in January 1970.

Thanks to the uprising of students that shook Tunisia in 1972, he was arrested on 14 February and transported with other prospects to a villa in Nassen (southern suburbs of Tunis) which turned out to be a torture center. On 21 April, the whole group was transferred to the civil prison of Tunis where they detained until December of the same year.

He was arrested again on 20 March 1975 in Carthage, in the suburbs of Tunis, for his clandestine activities within the renamed prospect group El Amal Ettounsi (L'Ouvrier tunisien). After a ten-hour torture session, he lost the use of his legs for three months. He was kept in Kasserine prison (center-west of Tunisia), then was transferred again to Borj Erroumi after it was decided to regroup political prisoners. He was later pardoned on 3 August 1979. .

Finally, following the events of Gafsa, on 26 January 1980 Fliss was among several former political prisoners arrested for "preventive" measures. He was released on 30 April of the same year.

== Uncle Hamda, the docker ==
Uncle Hamda, the docker, main character of Fliss's book, is no one other than his father. The author retraces his father's journey at the same time that he is writing his own biography. He is trying to show the true victim of a political prison is not so much the prisoner but the common man represented by his father.

One of the most important chapters of the book is about the death of Hamda Fliss and that his son is not allowed to attend his funeral. This episode is tragically experienced by the son who cannot mourn for his father and seeks, among other things by means of the book, to pay him the homage he did not do.

The book, which takes the form of a set of letters, retraces in a first part the history of the neighborhood where the Fliss family lived as well as that of the city of Bizerte. This ends, particularly, on the episode of the Bizerte crisis in which the family lost one of his sons. Subsequently, the book goes back to the author's prison experience and the various vicissitudes encountered by the father during this period. In this second part the work is illustrated by several letters which the author exchanged with the members of his family.

Mohamed Salah Fliss is also the author of Homeland of Stars, I am present.

== Political path ==
After having campaigned in the movement Perspectives and El Amal Ettounsi, Mohamed Salah Fliss joined in the Tunisian Human Rights League and became a member of its steering committee in the 1980s.

He wrote several articles in the newspapers Echaâb of Tunisian General Labour Union and the two authorized opposition political newspapers, Al Mawkif of Progressive Democratic Party and Attariq Al Jadid (Ettajdid Movement).

In 2005, he supported the 18-October movement for fundamental rights. After the revolution of 2011, he was named president of the special mandate in charge of the management of the municipality of Bizerte, making him the de facto mayor of the city for two years.

Fliss, who had already been part of the support committee of the Tunisian League for Human Rights, the man at the step of the ladder by the old regime, chaired the congress of the non-governmental organization in September 2011.

On 25 July 2012 in Bizerte, Boris Boillon, Ambassador of France in Tunisia gives him the insignia of knight of the Legion of Honor.
