= Josephine Okot =

Ugandan businesswoman, entrepreneur and corporate executive

- Born: 1970 (age 55–56); Gulu, Uganda
- Citizenship: Uganda
- Education: Makerere University Business School; Harvard Business School; Stanford Graduate School of Business; Washington International University
- Occupations: Businesswoman, entrepreneur & corporate executive
- Years active: 2004–present
- Title: Managing director & CEO, Victoria Seeds Limited

Josephine Okot is a Ugandan businesswoman, entrepreneur and corporate executive, who is the founder, managing director and chief executive officer of Victoria Seeds Limited, an agribusiness enterprise based in Uganda that processes, packages and markets agricultural seeds to farmers in the countries of the African Great Lakes.

== Background and education ==
Okot was born in Gulu District, in the Northern Region of Uganda. She attended Makerere University Business School (MUBS) and received postgraduate executive training from Harvard Business School and from Stanford Graduate School of Business, both in the U.S. Okot has considerable training and extensive experience in agribusiness. She is reported to have a Master of International Business, from Washington International University.

== Career ==
Okot founded Victoria Seeds Limited in 2004, with the primary objective of providing quality seeds to smallholder farmers, first domestically and then regionally.

Okot's company received a financial guarantee from a USAID-funded project, which allowed her to secure start-up funding. Victoria Seeds Limited is affiliated with 900 rural farmers, the majority of whom are women. The company markets nearly 100 varieties of seeds, through over 400 affiliated agro-dealer outlets. As of August 2011, the company annual sales exceeded US$2.5 million with about 140 employees.

As of 2013, Victoria Seeds Limited maintained three seed-processing facilities: the original facility in Gulu, Northern Uganda, established in 2004; the second facility, located in the city of Masindi, in the Western Region of Uganda, commissioned in 2011; and the new company headquarters and newest facility, located in Kampala Industrial and Business Park, in Namanve, Kira Municipality, Wakiso District, commissioned in 2012.

== Awards ==
In recognition of her efforts, persistence, resilience and mentorship, Okot has received national and international awards including the Yara Prize in 2007. In 2009, she received the Oslo Business for Peace Award for promoting ethical and socially responsible business practices. In 2013, Victoria Seeds received the Uganda Responsible Investment Award for Best Seed Company 2013.

== See also ==
- Agriculture in Uganda
- Business for Peace Foundation
