= Durreen Shahnaz =

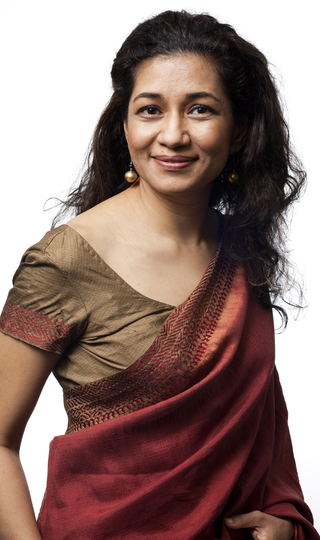
- Born: April 24, 1968 (age 58); Dhaka, Bangladesh
- Education: Smith College; Wharton School of Business; School for Advanced International Studies, Johns Hopkins University
- Occupations: Entrepreneur, professor and speaker

Durreen Shahnaz (born April 24, 1968) is a Bangladeshi American entrepreneur, professor, and speaker. She is the founder of Impact Investment Exchange (IIX). She has had a particularly pronounced role in the development of impact investing in Asia and the Pacific."India is a thriving market for impact investing: Durreen Shahnaz". Forbes India.

== Early life and education ==
Shahnaz was born in Dhaka, Bangladesh. The Bangladesh Liberation War began when she was three years old.

At 17 Shahnaz moved to the United States where she attended Smith College, graduating in 1989 with a double degree in government and economics. She later became the first Bangladeshi woman to attend the Wharton School of Business University of Pennsylvania and also received a joint master's degree from School for Advanced International Studies at Johns Hopkins University.

== Career ==
=== Early career ===
After graduating from Smith College, Shahnaz worked in investment banking in New York and microfinance in Bangladesh before shifting industries with a move to media and publishing.

=== Investment banking ===
Shahnaz kicked off her investment banking career at Morgan Stanley, becoming the first Bangladeshi woman on Wall Street. She later worked at Grameen Bank, the World Bank, and Merrill Lynch (working for short periods of time at each of these institutions (between 1-2 years)).

=== Media and publishing ===
Shahnaz headed the Asia operations of Hearst Magazines. She also worked at Reader’s Digest.

=== Entrepreneurship and impact investing ===
In 1999 Shahnaz founded her first business, oneNest. Within a year Shahnaz and oneNest were featured in the book Dotcom Diva by Elizabeth Carlassare. The online marketplace was a first of its kind designed to connect conscientious consumers with ethical producers. The company sold in 2004 at which point Shahnaz began lecturing on social entrepreneurship and innovation at the National University of Singapore.

Her publications and blog Conscious Capitalism focused on innovation and new ways of thinking about capital structures and economics in Asia. After the 2008 financial crisis, Shahnaz was invited by the Rockefeller Foundation to confer on ways to move flawed financial systems forward.

Out of this Shahnaz founded Impact Investment Exchange (IIX), the world's first social stock exchange which Shahnaz continues to operate today. Since its beginnings, IIX has expanded to include various investment platforms, financial structures, and research and accelerator programs and has positively impacted over 159 million lives in over 57 countries.

The concepts driving much of this work were illustrated in her 2013 TED talk, How capitalism and philanthropy can collaborate to solve big problems.

== Awards ==
In 2014 Shahnaz was awarded the prestigious Joseph Wharton Social Impact Award by her alma mater Wharton School of Business at the University of Pennsylvania for her notable contribution to leveraging financial markets for social impact.

In 2016 the Asia Society honored Shahnaz with the Asia Game Changer Award for changing the lives of millions through impact investing.

In 2017 Shahnaz received The Oslo Business for Peace Award for her work in transforming financial and capital markets into mechanisms for social good as well as profit.

== Books ==
- 2001: DotCom divas : E-business insights from the visionary women founders of 20 net ventures, featured in Ch. 13
- 2014: New frontiers of philanthropy : a guide to the new tools and actors reshaping global philanthropy and social investing, Ch. 4
- 2023: The Defiant Optimist: Daring to Fight Global Inequality, Reinvent Finance, and Invest in Women.
