= Anders Dahlvig =

Swedish businessman

Anders Dahlvig (born 1957) is a Swedish businessman and the former president of the Swedish furniture store chain, IKEA. Dahlvig started working for IKEA in 1984 and has held various positions since, including store manager, country manager of United Kingdom and Vice President, Europe. He held the position of CEO between 1999 and 2009 and has received various recognitions for IKEA Group's work to promote diversity. Dahlvig is chairman of group parent company Inter-IKEA (2016). He is a member of European Retail Round Table.

== Educaiton ==
He earned a B.S. in business administration from Lund University and a master's degree in economics from University of California, Santa Barbara.

== Career ==
Additionally, Dahlvig is on the board of UK-based retailer Kingfisher plc as a non-executive director.

== Honors and awards ==
He received the Swedish award for Good Environmental Leadership in 2002 for his independent and persistent work with environmental and sustainability issues. In 2006, he also received the U.S. Foreign Policy Association's Global Social Responsibility award. Dahlvig is a regular speaker at international conferences. In 2019, Dahlvig won the Oslo Business for Peace Award, which is given to leaders in the private sector who have demonstrated transformative and positive change through ethical business practices.
