= Habib Achour =

Tunisian trade unionist

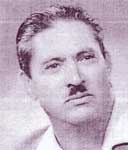
Habib in 1957

Habib Achour (Arabic:الحبيب عاشور; February 25, 1913 in Kerkennah Islands – March 14, 1999 in Kerkennah Islands) was a Tunisian trade unionist. As vice president of the International Confederation of Free Trade Unions, Achour was among the founders of the Tunisian General Labour Union (UGTT) in 1946, which he directed three times: from 1963 to 1965, from 1970 to 1978, and from 1984 to 1989
