= Houcine Abassi =

Tunisian unionist (born 1947)

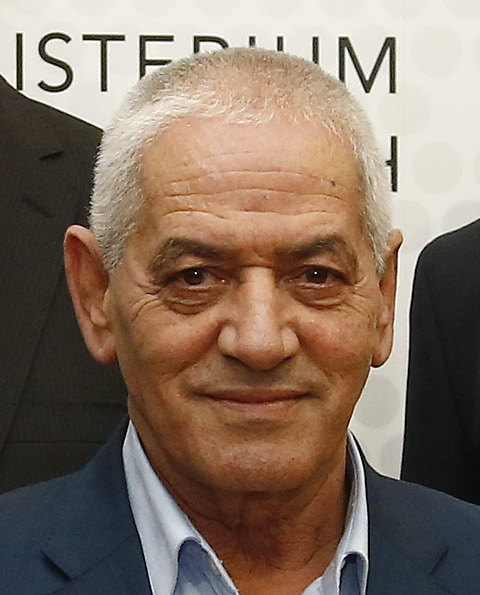
- Houcine Abassi in 2016
- Born: 19 August 1947 (age 78); Sbikha, Tunisia
- Occupations: Educational consultant; Syndicalist

Houcine Abassi (Arabic: حسين العباسي; born 19 August 1947), is a Tunisian unionist.

== Biography ==
He served as the Secretary General of the Tunisian General Labour Union (UGTT) starting in 2011. UGTT was part of the Tunisian National Dialogue Quartet, which was awarded the 2015 Nobel Peace Prize "for its decisive contribution to the building of a pluralistic democracy in Tunisia in the wake of the Tunisian Revolution of 2011". Along with other leaders of the Quartet, Wided Bouchamaoui, Mohammed Fadhel Mafoudh and Abdessatar Ben Moussa, Houcine Abassi traveled to Oslo to collect the Nobel Peace Prize on 10 December 2015.

He is also a permanent member of the executive board of the International Trade Union Confederation and President of the Arab Trade Union Confederation.

== Honours and awards ==
- Nobel Peace Prize (2015)
- Grand-officier of the Order of the Republic of Tunisia (2015)
- Commandeur of the Legion of Honour of France (2015)
- German Africa Foundation prize (2015)
- Fairness Awards (2015)
- Honorary Degree from Doshisha University (2017)
- Honorary Degree from Paris Dauphine University (2017)

== Publications ==
- (ar) Tunisia and its squandered opportunities (تونس و الفرص المهدورة), Tunis, ed. Nirvana, 2023.
