= Until We Are Free =

2016 book

- Author: Shirin Ebadi
- Subject: Human rights under the Islamic Republic.
- Genre: Non-fiction, Memoir
- Publisher: Random House
- Publication date: March 8, 2016
- Pages: 304
- ISBN: 978-0812998870

Until We Are Free: My Fight for Human Rights (Persian: تا زمانی که آزاد شویم, romanized: Ta zamani keh azad shvim) is a 2016 non-fiction book by Shirin Ebadi, chronicling her decades of struggle for human rights under the Islamic Republic of Iran. In the book, Ebadi recounts her struggle against Iran's authoritarian system.
