= Tarek Bouchamaoui =

Tunisian businessman and association football personality

- Born: 7 July 1966 (age 59); Tunisia
- Occupation: Businessman
- Parent: Hédi Bouchamaoui
- Relatives: Wided Bouchamaoui (sister)

Tarek Bouchamaoui (born 7 July 1966) is a Tunisian businessman and football personality, member of the FIFA Council, member of the executive committee of the Confederation of African Football (CAF), and was head of CAF's referees committee from 2011 to 2013.

Bouchamaoui has been a FIFA Council member since 2015.

== Early life ==
His grandfather, Ahmed, started a civil engineering company. His father took over part of the firm and it became Hédi Bouchamaoui & Sons, which specializes in oil, textile and other industry.

His sister, Wided Bouchamaoui, is a prominent businesswoman.

== Career ==
Bouchamaoui is the managing director of HBS International, an oil company based in Egypt. He is also a shareholder and board of directors member of several companies and private equity funds, including HBG Holding, a holding company based in Tunisia.

Strongly involved in football activities, he has been a member of the FIFA Council since 2015 and the CAF (Confederation of African Football) executive committee since 2011.

He was closely allied to Tunisia's former president, Ben Ali, and one of those named as using HSBC's private bank tax evasion schemes in Switzerland, although never charged with any offence. Jeune Afrique reported that the Swiss Leaks investigation revealed that Bouchamaoui had over 43 million Euros in an HSBC bank account. In addition, he had three business accounts as well, two of which were accounts of a subsidiary of his family group, Hédi Bouchamaoui and Sons (HBS International Ltd), and all three accounts related to companies registered in the Bahamas.
