= Emily Cummins =

British inventor (born 1987)

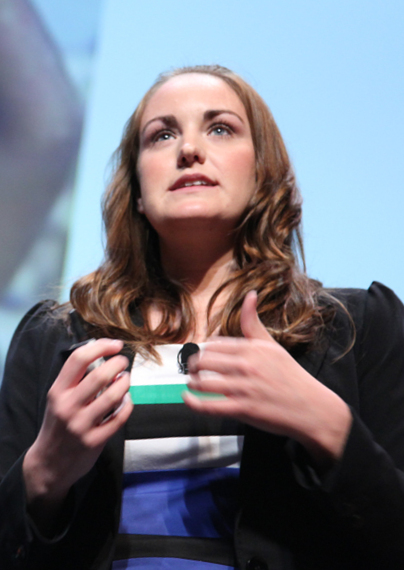
- Cummins in 2011
- Born: 11 February 1987 (age 39)
- Education: University of Leeds, Leeds University Business School
- Scientific career
- Fields: British inventor

Emily Jayne Cummins (born 11 February 1987) is an English inventor and entrepreneur.
