= Biff Fliss =

Canadian gridiron football player (1928–2013)

Profile
- Position: Halfback

Personal information
- Born: July 22, 1928; Winnipeg, Manitoba
- Died: December 21, 2013 (aged 85); West St. Paul, Manitoba
- Listed height: 6 ft 2 in (1.88 m)
- Listed weight: 230 lb (104 kg)

Career history
- 1951–1952: Winnipeg Blue Bombers

William Fliss (July 22, 1928 – December 21, 2013) was a Canadian professional football player, who played for the Winnipeg Blue Bombers.
