= Shirin Ebadi =

Iranian-British lawyer, activist (born 1947)

- شيرين عبادى
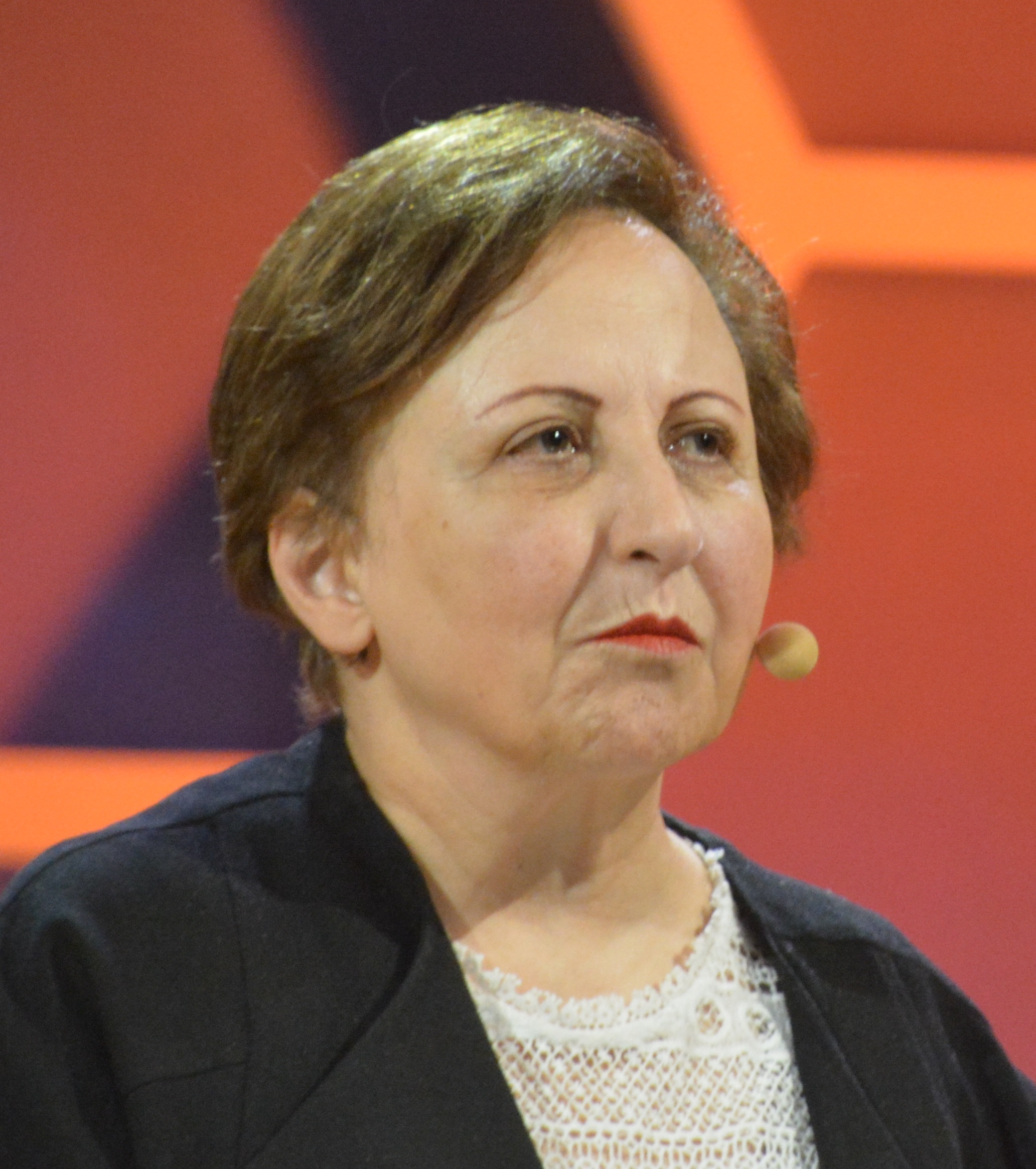
- Ebadi in 2017
- Born: 21 June 1947 (age 79); Hamadan, Iran
- Education: University of Tehran
- Occupations: Lawyer; judge
- Known for: Defenders of Human Rights Center
- Awards: Rafto Prize (2001); Nobel Peace Prize (2003); JPM Interfaith Award (2004); Legion of Honour (2006)

Shirin Ebadi (Persian: شيرين عبادى, romanized: Širin Ebādi; born 21 June 1947) is an Iranian Nobel laureate, lawyer, writer, teacher and a former judge and founder of the Defenders of Human Rights Center in Iran. In 2003, Ebadi was awarded the Nobel Peace Prize for her pioneering efforts for democracy and women's, children's, and refugee rights. She was the first Iranian to receive the award.

She has lived in exile in London since 2009. In March 2026, Iranian opposition leader Reza Pahlavi said that Ebadi would lead a committee to draft regulations for transitional justice in Iran, creating a framework for a court and fact-finding commission to address human rights violations under the Islamic Republic. She was named one of the 100 most influential people in 2026 by Time magazine.

== Biography ==
=== Life and early career as a judge ===
Ebadi was born in Hamedan into an educated family. Her mother was Minu Yamini, and father, Mohammad Ali Ebadi, was the city's chief notary public and a professor of commercial law. When she was an infant, her family moved to Tehran. Before earning a law degree from the University of Tehran Ebadi attended Anoshiravn Dadgar and Reza Shah Kabir schools.

She was admitted to the law department of the University of Tehran in 1965 and 1969; upon graduation, she passed the qualification exams to become a judge. After a six-month internship period, she officially became a judge in March 1969. She continued her studies at the University of Tehran to pursue a doctorate in law; in 1971, one of her professors was Mahmoud Shehabi Khorassani. In 1975, she became the first female president of the Tehran city court and served until the Iranian Revolution. She was one of the first female judges in Iran.

After the 1979 Revolution women were no longer allowed to serve as judges and she was dismissed and given a new job as a clerk in the court she had presided over.

Later, despite already having a law office permit her applications were repeatedly rejected, and Ebadi was unable to practice law until 1993. She used this free time to write books and many articles in Iranian periodicals.

=== Ebadi as a lawyer ===
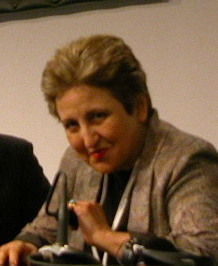
Shirin Ebadi at a WSIS press conference

By 2004, Ebadi was lecturing in law at the University of Tehran while practising law in Iran. She is a campaigner for strengthening the legal status of children and women, and her work on women's rights played a key role in the May 1997 landslide presidential election of the reformist Mohammad Khatami.

As a lawyer, she is known for taking up pro bono cases of dissident figures who were persecuted by the Iranian judiciary. Among her clients were the family of Dariush Forouhar, a dissident intellectual and politician who was found stabbed to death, along with his wife, Parvaneh Eskandari, in their home.

Forouhar and Eskandari were among several dissidents who died in a spate of murders that terrorized the Iranian intellectual community. Suspicion fell on extremist hard-liners determined to stop the more liberal climate fostered by President Khatami, who championed freedom of speech. The murders were found to be committed by a team of employees of the Iranian Ministry of Intelligence, whose head, Saeed Emami, allegedly committed suicide in jail before being brought to court.

Ebadi represented the family of Ezzat Ebrahim-Nejad, who was killed in the Iranian student protests in July 1999. In 2000 Ebadi was accused of manipulating the videotaped confession of Amir Farshad Ebrahimi, a former member of the Ansar-e Hezbollah. Ebrahimi confessed his involvement in attacks by the organization on the orders of high-level conservative authorities, including the killing of Ezzat Ebrahim-Nejad and attacks against members of President Khatami's cabinet. Ebadi claimed that she had only videotaped Amir Farshad Ebrahimi's confessions to present them to the court. This case was named "Tape makers" by hardliners who questioned the credibility of his videotaped deposition and his motives. Ebadi and another lawyer, Rohami were sentenced to five years in jail and suspension of their law licenses for sending Ebrahimi's videotaped deposition to President Khatami and the head of the Islamic judiciary. The Islamic judiciary's supreme court later vacated the sentences, but they did not forgive Ebarahimi's videotaped confession and sentenced him to 48 months in jail, including 16 months in solitary confinement. This case brought an increased focus on Iran from human rights groups abroad.

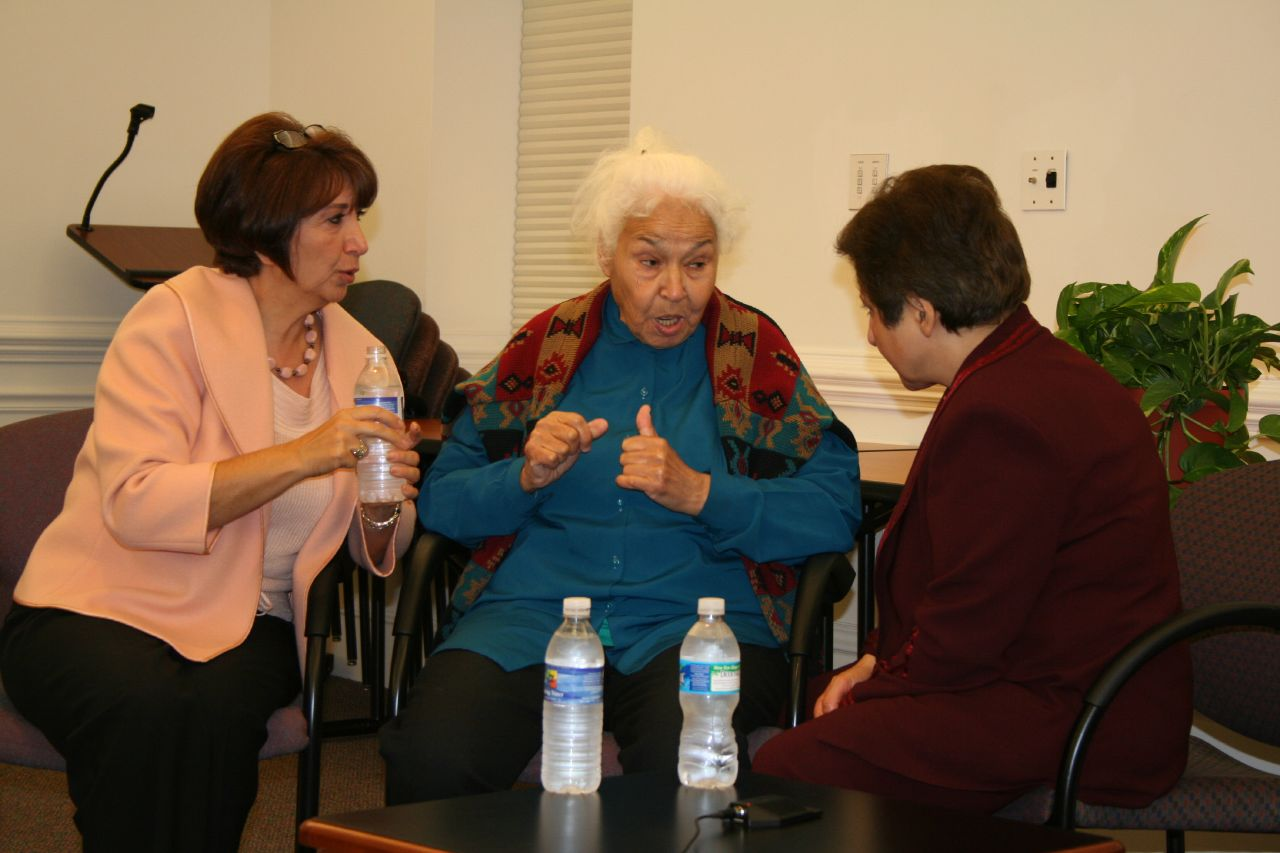
Shirin Ershadi, Shirin Ebadi and Nawal El Saadawi

Ebadi defended child abuse cases, including the case of Arian Golshani, a child who was abused for years and then beaten to death by her father and stepbrother. This case gained international attention and caused controversy in Iran. Ebadi used this case to highlight Iran's problematic child custody laws, whereby custody of children in divorce is usually given to the father, even in the case of Arian, where her mother had told the court that the father was abusive and had begged for custody of her daughter. Ebadi also handled the case of Leila, a teenage girl who was gang-raped and murdered. Leila's family became homeless, trying to cover the costs of the execution of the perpetrators owed to the government because, in the Islamic Republic of Iran, it is the victim's family's responsibility to pay to restore their honor when a girl is raped by paying the government to execute the perpetrator. Ebadi was not able to achieve victory in this case. Still, she brought international attention to this problematic law. Ebadi also handled a few cases dealing with bans of periodicals (including the cases of Habibollah Peyman, Abbas Marufi, and Faraj Sarkouhi). She has also established two non-governmental organizations in Iran with Western funding, the Society for Protecting the Rights of the Child (SPRC) (1994) and the Defenders of Human Rights Center (DHRC) in 2001.

Ebadi helped in the drafting of the original text of a law against physical abuse of children, which was passed by the Iranian parliament in 2002. Female members of Parliament asked Ebadi to draft a law explaining how a woman's right to divorce her husband is in line with Sharia (Islamic Law). Ebadi presented the bill before the government, but the male members made her leave without considering the bill, according to Ebadi's memoir.

On 16 March 2026, Reza Pahlavi appointed Ebadi as head of a committee called the Transitional Justice Regulations Drafting Committee, that includes Iraj Mesdaghi, Leila Bahmani, and Afshin Ellian, for planning for a hypothetical transitional Iranian government led by Pahlavi following the 2026 Iran war. The committee was expected to prepare rules to create a court and a fact-finding commission for post-1979 human rights violations in Iran. The committee is planned to consist of Iranian legal experts and activists.

== Political views ==
In her book Iran Awakening, Ebadi explains her political/religious views on Islam, democracy and gender equality:

In the last 23 years, from the day I was stripped of my judgeship to the years of doing battle in the revolutionary courts of Tehran, I had repeated one refrain: an interpretation of Islam that is in harmony with equality and democracy is an authentic expression of faith. Not religion binds women, but the selective dictates of those who wish them cloistered. That belief and the conviction that change in Iran must come peacefully and from within has underpinned my work.

At the same time, Ebadi expresses a nationalist love of Iran and has criticized the policies and actions of Western countries. She opposed the pro-Western Shah, initially supported the Islamic Revolution, and remembers the CIA's 1953 overthrow of prime minister Mohammad Mosaddeq with rage.

At a press conference shortly after the Peace Prize announcement, Ebadi explicitly rejected foreign interference in Iranian affairs: "The fight for human rights is conducted in Iran by the Iranian people, and we are against any foreign intervention in Iran."

Subsequently, Ebadi openly defended the Iraniani government's nuclear development program:

Aside from being economically justified, it has become a cause of national pride for an old nation with a glorious history. No Iranian government, regardless of its ideology or democratic credentials, would dare to stop the program.

However, in a 2012 interview, Ebadi stated:

The [Iranian] people want to stop enrichment, but the government doesn't listen. Iran is situated on a fault line, and people are scared of a Fukushima type of situation happening. We want peace, security, and economic welfare, and we cannot forgo all of our other rights for nuclear energy. The government claims it is not making a bomb. But I am not a member of the government, so I cannot speak to this directly. The fear is that if they do, Israel will be wiped out. If the Iranian people are able to topple the government, this could improve the situation. [In 2009] the people of Iran rose up and were badly suppressed. Right now, Iran is the country with the most journalists in prison. This is the price people are paying.

Concerning the Israeli–Palestinian conflict, in 2010, Shirin Ebadi was one of four Peace Prize laureates supporting legislation requiring the University of California to divest itself from any companies providing technology to the Israel Defense Forces, who (bill supporters declared) were engaged in war crimes. (The legislation was supported by the Associated Students of the University of California).

Since the victory of Hassan Rouhani in the 2013 Iranian presidential election, Shirin Ebadi has expressed her worry about the growing human rights violations in Iran. Ebadi, in a December 2013 speech at a Human Rights Day seminar at Leiden University stated, "I will shut up, but the problems of Iran will not be solved".

In April 2015, speaking on the subject of the Western campaign against the Sunni extremist group ISIL in Syria and Iraq, Ebadi expressed her desire that the Western world spend money funding education and an end to corruption rather than fighting with guns and bombs. She reasoned that because the Islamic State stems from an ideology based on a "wrong interpretation of Islam", physical force would not destroy ISIS because it would not end its beliefs.

In 2018, in an interview with Bloomberg, Ebadi stated her belief that the Islamic Republic had reached a point of becoming un-reformable. Ebadi called for a referendum on the Islamic Republic.

During the 2025–2026 Iranian protests, Ebadi condemned Iranian security forces for directly shooting unarmed protesters in Fasa, calling it a human rights violation. In a message shared on Instagram, Ebadi stressed that using live ammunition against unarmed civilians cannot be justified. She urged authorities to immediately stop the violence, ensure proper medical care for those injured, and investigate who authorized the use of live fire against protesters in Fasa.

During the 2026 Iran war ceasefire, Ebadi criticized European governments for their silence in light of the Iranian government's repression of the Iranian people.

== Nobel Peace Prize ==
On 10 October 2003, Ebadi was awarded the Nobel Peace Prize for her efforts for democracy and human rights, especially for the rights of women and children. The selection committee praised her as a "courageous person" who "has never heeded the threat to her own safety". In her acceptance speech, Ebadi stated that she is against a policy of forced regime change.

The decision of the Nobel committee surprised some observers worldwide. Pope John Paul II had been predicted to win the Peace Prize amid speculation that he was nearing death. The era in which her prize was granted has been called one "when there still seemed a chance of something resembling a détente" between the U.S. and Iran (according to Associated Press).

Ebadi presented a book entitled Democracy, human rights, and Islam in modern Iran: Psychological, social and cultural perspectives to the Nobel Committee. The volume documents the historical and cultural basis of democracy and human rights from Cyrus and Darius, 2,500 years ago to Mohammad Mossadeq, the prime minister of modern Iran who nationalized the oil industry. In her acceptance speech, Ebadi criticized repression in Iran and insisted that Islam was compatible with democracy, human rights and freedom of opinion. In the same speech she also criticized US foreign policy, particularly the War on terrorism. She was the first Iranian and the first Muslim woman to receive the prize.

Thousands greeted her at Mehrabad International Airport when she returned from Paris after receiving the news that she had won the prize. The response to the award in Iran was mixed—enthusiastic supporters greeted her at the airport upon her return, the conservative media underplayed it, and then-Iranian President Mohammad Khatami criticized it as political. Iranian officials were either silent or critical of the selection of Ebadi, calling it a political act by a pro-Western institution, and criticised Ebadi for not covering her hair at the Nobel award ceremony.

IRNA reported the Nobel committee's decision in a few lines that the evening newspapers and the Iranian state media waited hours to report, and as the last item on the radio news update. Reformist officials were said to have "generally welcomed the award", but "[came] under attack for doing so." Reformist president Mohammad Khatami did not officially congratulate Ebadi and stated that although the scientific Nobels are important, the Peace Prize is "not very important" and was awarded to Ebadi on the basis of "totally political criteria". Vice President Mohammad Ali Abtahi, the only official to initially congratulate Ebadi, defended the president, stating, "abusing the President's words about Ms. Ebadi is tantamount to abusing the prize bestowed on her for political considerations".

In 2009, Norway's Foreign Minister Jonas Gahr Støre, published a statement reporting that Ebadi's Nobel Peace Prize had been confiscated by Iranian authorities and that "This [was] the first time a Nobel Peace Prize ha[d] been confiscated by national authorities." Iran denied the charges.

== Post-Nobel prize ==
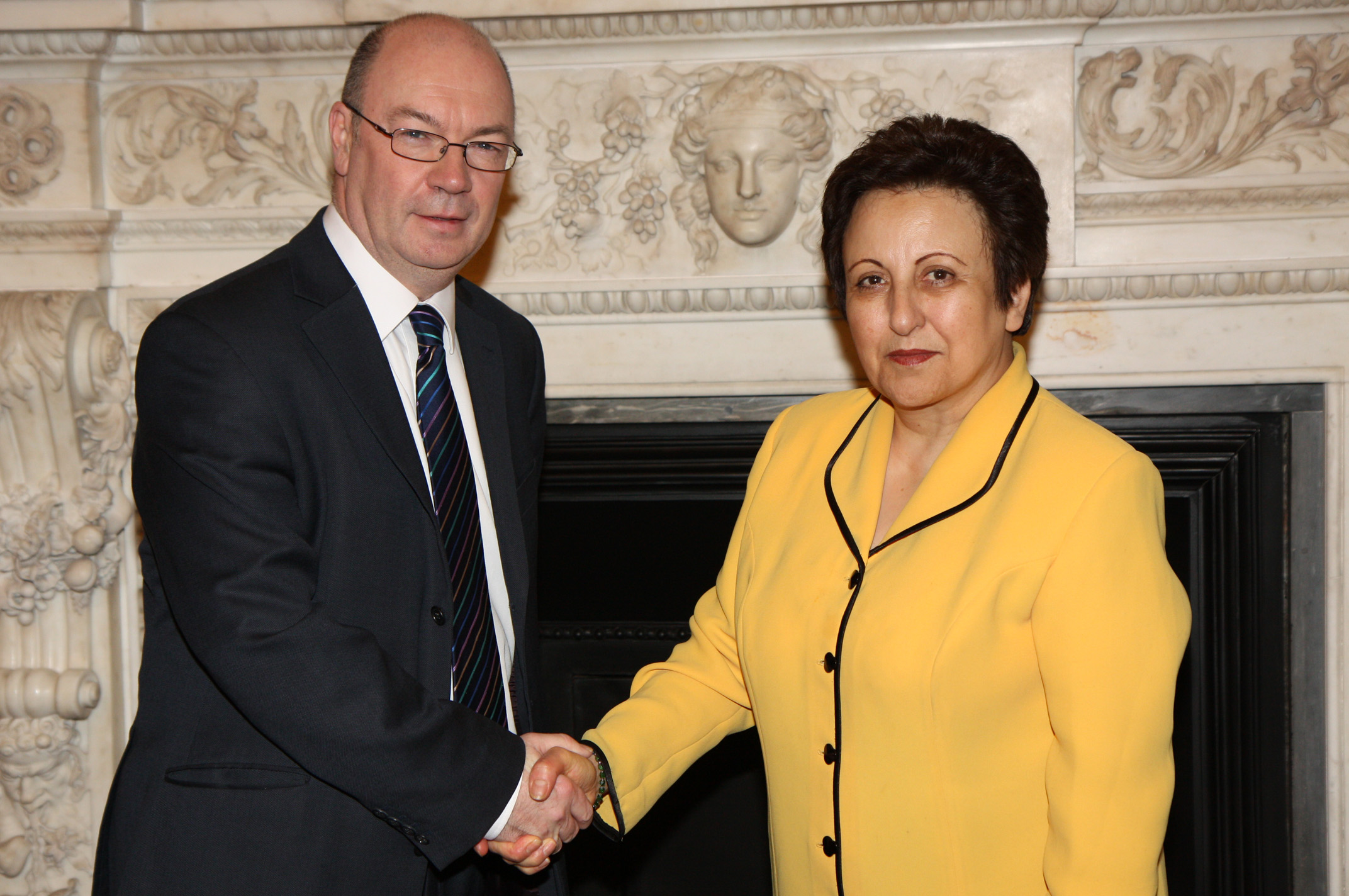
UK Foreign Office Minister Alistair Burt meeting Ebadi in London, 3 February 2011

Since receiving the Nobel Prize, Ebadi has lectured, taught and received awards in different countries, issued statements and defended people accused of political crimes in Iran. She has traveled to and spoken to audiences in India, the United States, and other countries; released her autobiography in an English translation. With five other Nobel laureates, she created the Nobel Women's Initiative to promote peace, justice, and equality for women. In 2019, Ebadi called for a treaty to end violence against women, in support of Every Woman Coalition.

=== Threats ===
In April 2008, she told Reuters news agency that Iran's human rights record had regressed in the past two years and agreed to defend Baháʼís arrested in Iran in May 2008.

In April 2008, Ebadi released a statement saying: "Threats against my life and security and those of my family, which began some time ago, have intensified," and that the threats warned her against making speeches abroad and to stop defending Iran's persecuted Baháʼí community. In August 2008, the IRNA news agency published an article attacking Ebadi's links to the Baháʼí Faith and accused her of seeking support from the West. It also criticized Ebadi for defending homosexuals, appearing without the Islamic headscarf abroad, questioning Islamic punishments, and "defending CIA agents". It accused her daughter, Nargess Tavassolian, of conversion to the Baháʼí faith, a capital offense in the Islamic Republic. However Shirin Ebadi has denied it, saying, "I am proud to say that my family and I are Shiites." Her daughter believes "the government wanted to scare my mother with this scenario." Ebadi believes the attacks are in retaliation for her agreeing to defend the families of the seven Baháʼís arrested in May.

In December 2008, Iranian police shut down the office of a human rights group led by her. Another human rights group, Human Rights Watch, has said it was "extremely worried" about Ebadi's safety, and in December 2009 issued a statement demanding the Islamic Republic "stop harassing" her. Among many other complaints, the group accused the IRI of detaining "Ebadi's husband and sister for questioning and threatened them with losing their jobs and eventual arrest if Ebadi continues her human rights advocacy."

=== Seizure ===
Ebadi said while in London in late November 2009 that her Nobel Peace Prize medal and diploma had been taken from their bank box alongside her Légion d'honneur and a ring she had received from Germany's association of journalists. She said they had been taken by the Revolutionary Court approximately three weeks previously. Ebadi also said her bank account was frozen by authorities. Norwegian Minister of Foreign Affairs Jonas Gahr Støre expressed his "shock and disbelief" at the incident. The Iranian foreign ministry subsequently denied the confiscation, and also criticized Norway for interfering in Iran's affairs.

=== Post-Nobel Prize timeline ===
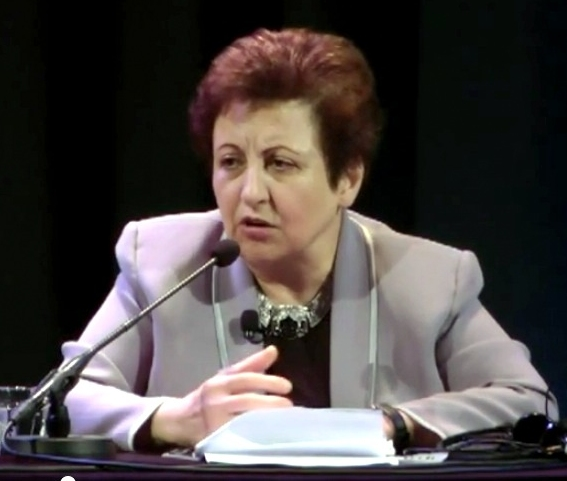
Shirin Ebadi during a lecture – organized by University of Amsterdam, 7 November 2011

- 2003 (November) – She declared that she would provide legal representation for the family of the murdered Canadian freelance photographer Zahra Kazemi. The trial was halted in July 2004, prompting Ebadi and her team to leave the court in protest that their witnesses had not been heard.
- 2004 (January) – During the World Social Forum in Bombay Ebadi, speaking at a small girls' school run by the NGO "Sahyog", proposed that 30 January (the day Mahatma Gandhi was assassinated) be observed as International Day of Non-Violence. This proposal was brought to her by school children in Paris by their Indian teacher Akshay Bakaya. Three years later, Sonia Gandhi and Archbishop Desmond Tutu relayed the idea at the Delhi Satyagraha Convention in January 2007, preferring however to propose Gandhi's birthday on 2 October. The UN General Assembly on 15 June 2007 adopted 2 October as the International Day of Non-Violence.
- 2004 – Ebadi was listed by Forbes magazine as one of the "100 most powerful women in the world". She is also included in a published list of the "100 most influential women of all time".
- 2005 Spring – Ebadi taught a course on "Islam and Human Rights" at the University of Arizona's James E. Rogers College of Law in Tucson, Arizona.
- 2005 (12 May) – Ebadi delivered an address on Senior Class Day at Vanderbilt University, Nashville, Tennessee. Vanderbilt Chancellor Gordon Gee presented Ebadi with the Chancellor's Medal for her human rights work.
- 2005 – Ebadi was voted the world's 12th leading public intellectual in The 2005 Global Intellectuals Poll by Prospect (UK).
- 2006 – Random House released her first book for a Western audience, Iran Awakening: A Memoir of Revolution and Hope, with Azadeh Moaveni. A reading of the book was serialized as BBC Radio 4's Book of the Week in September 2006. American novelist David Ebershoff was the book's editor.
- 2006 – Ebadi was one of the founders of The Nobel Women's Initiative along with sister Nobel Peace laureates Betty Williams, Mairead Corrigan Maguire, Wangari Maathai, Jody Williams and Rigoberta Menchú Tum. Six women representing North America and South America, Europe, the Middle East and Africa decided to bring together their experiences in a united effort for peace with justice and equality. The Nobel Women's Initiative aims to help strengthen work being done in support of women's rights worldwide.
- 2007 (17 May) – Ebadi announced that she would defend the Iranian American scholar Haleh Esfandiari, who is jailed in Tehran.
- 2008 (March) – Ebadi tells Reuters news agency that Iran's human rights record had regressed in the past two years.
- 2008 (14 April) – Ebadi released a statement saying, "Threats against my life and security and those of my family, which began some time ago, have intensified", and that the threats warned her against making speeches abroad and against defending Iran's persecuted Baháʼí community.
- 2008 (June) – Ebadi volunteered to be the lawyer for the arrested Baháʼí leadership of Iran in June.
- 2008 (7 August) – Ebadi announced via the Muslim Network for Baháʼí Rights that she would defend in court the seven Baháʼí leaders arrested in the spring.
- 2008 (1 September) – Ebadi published her book Refugee Rights in Iran exposing the lack of rights given to Afghan refugees living in Iran.
- 2008 (21 December) – Ebadi's office of the Center for the Defense of Human Rights was raided and closed.
- 2008 (29 December) – Islamic authorities close Ebadi's Center for Defenders of Human Rights, raiding her private office, seizing her computers and files. Worldwide condemnation of raid.
- 2009 (1 January) – Pro-regime "demonstrators" attack Ebadi's home and office.
- 2009 (12 June) – Ebadi was at a seminar in Spain at the time of Iranian presidential election. "[W]hen the crackdown began colleagues told her not to come home" and as of October 2009 she has not returned to Iran.
- 2009 (16 June) – In the midst of nationwide protests against the very surprising and highly suspect election results giving incumbent President Mahmoud Ahmadinejad a landslide victory, Ebadi calls for new elections in an interview with Radio Free Europe.
- 2009 (24 September) – Touring abroad to lobby international leaders and highlight the Islamic regime's human rights abuses since June, Ebadi criticizes the British government for putting talks on the Islamic regime's nuclear program ahead of protesting its brutal suppression of opposition. Noting the British Ambassador attended President Ahmadinejad's inauguration, she said, "`That's when I felt that human rights were being neglected. ... Undemocratic countries are more dangerous than a nuclear bomb. It's undemocratic countries that jeopardize international peace.`" She calls for "the downgrading of Western embassies, the withdrawal of ambassadors and the freezing of the assets of Iran's leaders."
- 2009 (November) – The Iranian authorities seize Ebadi's Nobel medal together with other belongings from her safe-deposit box.
- 2009 (29 December) – Ebadi's sister Noushin Ebadi was detained apparently to silence Ebadi who is abroad. "She was neither politically active nor had a role in any rally. It's necessary to point out that in the past two months she had been summoned several times to the Intelligence Ministry, who told her to persuade me to give up my human rights activities. I have been arrested solely because of my activities in human rights," Ebadi said.
- 2010 (June) – Ebadi's husband denounced her on state television. According to Ebadi this was a coerced confession after his arrest and torture.
- 2012 (26 January) — in a statement released by the International Campaign for Human Rights in Iran, Ebadi called on "all freedom-loving people across the globe" to work for the release of three opposition leaders — Zahra Rahnavard, Mir Hossein Mousavi, and Mehdi Karroubi — who have been confined to house arrest for nearly a year.

== Lawsuits ==
=== Lawsuit against the United States ===
In 2004, Ebadi filed a lawsuit against the U.S. Department of Treasury because of restrictions she faced over publishing her memoir in the United States. American trade laws prohibit writers from embargoed countries. The law also banned American literary agent Wendy Strothman from working with Ebadi. Azar Nafisi wrote a letter in support of Ebadi. Nafisi said that the law infringes on the First Amendment. After a lengthy legal battle, Ebadi won and was able to publish her memoir in the United States.

== Other activities ==
- Apne Aap Women Worldwide, Co-Chair of the International Advisory Board
- Aurora Prize, Member of the Selection Committee (since 2015)
- Business for Peace Award Committee, Member (2009)
- Reporters Without Borders (RWB), Member of the Emeritus Board
- Scholars at Risk (SAR), Member of the Ambassadors Council
- Nuremberg International Human Rights Award, Member of the Jury (2004–2020)

== Recognition ==
=== Awards ===
- Awarded plate by Human Rights Watch, 1996
- Official spectator of Human Rights Watch, 1996
- Awarded Rafto Prize, Human Rights Prize in Norway, 2001
- Nobel Peace Prize in October 2003
- Women's eNews 21 Leaders for the 21st Century Award, 2004
- International Democracy Award, 2004
- James Parks Morton Interfaith Award from the Interfaith Center of New York, 2004
- ‘Lawyer of the Year’ award, 2004
- UCI Citizen Peacebuilding Award, 2005
- The Golden Plate Award by the American Academy of Achievement, 2005
- Legion of Honor award, 2006
- Toleranzpreis der Evangelischen Akademie Tutzing, 2008
- Award for the Global Defence of Human Rights, International Service Human Rights Award, 2009
- Wolfgang Friedmann Memorial Award, Columbia Journal of Transnational Law, 2013
- Time 100, Time magazine, 2026

=== Honorary degrees ===
- Doctor of Laws, Williams College, 2004
- Doctor of Laws, Brown University, 2004
- Doctor of Laws, University of British Columbia, 2004
- Honorary doctorate, University of Maryland, College Park, 2004
- Honorary doctorate, University of Toronto, 2004
- Honorary doctorate, Simon Fraser University, 2004
- Honorary doctorate, University of Akureyri, 2004
- Honorary doctorate, Australian Catholic University, 2005
- Honorary doctorate, University of San Francisco, 2005
- Honorary doctorate, Concordia University, 2005
- Honorary doctorate, The University of York, The University of Canada, 2005
- Honorary doctorate, Université Jean Moulin in Lyon, 2005
- Honorary doctorate, Loyola University Chicago, 2007
- Honorary Doctorate The New School University, 2007
- Honorary Doctor of Laws, Marquette University, 2009
- Honorary Doctor of Law, University of Cambridge, 2011
- Honorary Doctorate, School of Oriental and African Studies (SOAS) University of London, 2012
- Honorary Doctor of Laws, Law Society of Upper Canada, 2012

== Books published ==
- Iran Awakening: One Woman's Journey to Reclaim Her Life and Country (2007) ISBN 978-0-676-97802-5
- Refugee Rights in Iran (2008) ISBN 978-0-86356-678-3
- The Golden Cage: Three brothers, Three choices, One destiny (2011) ISBN 978-0-9798456-4-2
- Until We Are Free (2016) ISBN 978-0812998870

== See also ==
- Iranian women
- List of famous Persian women
- List of peace activists
- Intellectual movements in Iran
- Persian women's movement
- Islamic feminism
- List of Iranian women activists
- List of Muslim feminists
