= Tunisian General Labour Union =

Tunisian trade union

UGTT
- Tunisian General Labour Union
- Union Générale Tunisienne du Travail
- Founded: January 20, 1946
- Headquarters: 29 Rue Mohamed Ali, Tunis
- Location: Tunisia
- Members: 1 million (2021)
- Key people: Salaheddine Selmi, secretary general
- Publication: Al-Sha'ab
- Affiliations: ITUC, ATUC
- Website: www.ugtt.org.tn

The Tunisian General Labour Union (French: Union Générale Tunisienne du Travail, UGTT. Arabic: الاتحاد العام التونسي للشغل) is a national trade union center in Tunisia. It has a membership of more than one million and was founded on January 20, 1946.

The UGTT is affiliated with the International Trade Union Confederation and the Arab Trade Union Confederation. Author Safwan M. Masri has noted the influence of "notable intellectuals such as Tahar Haddad," among other early twentieth-century reformers and thinkers, on the development of labor power in Tunisia.

In recent years, the UGTT worked together with three other organizations (the Tunisian Human Rights League-LTDH, the Tunisian Confederation of Industry, Trade and Handicrafts-UTICA and the Tunisian Order of Lawyers), collectively labelled the National Dialogue Quartet, to address the national discord following the Jasmine Revolution of 2011. The National Dialogue Quartet was afterward announced as the laureate of the 2015 Nobel Peace Prize "for its decisive contribution to the building of a pluralistic democracy in Tunisia".

Scholar Joel Beinin has previously stated that the UGTT is "the single most important reason that Tunisia is a democracy today" (however, this statement was made prior to the coup of 2021). Safwan Masri contrasts the status of the union in Tunisia with the relatively disempowered labor organizations throughout the rest of the Arab world; in 2017, he observed that "UGTT has historically served as the umbrella organization for social movements in Tunisia, a role that is likely to endure." Following its congress in Monastir, held on March 25, 26, and 27, 2026, the UGTT unveiled a new Executive Bureau.

Former Executive Bureau member Slaheddine Selmi was elected Secretary General, succeeding Noureddine Tabboubi.

== Chairman (secretaries-general) ==
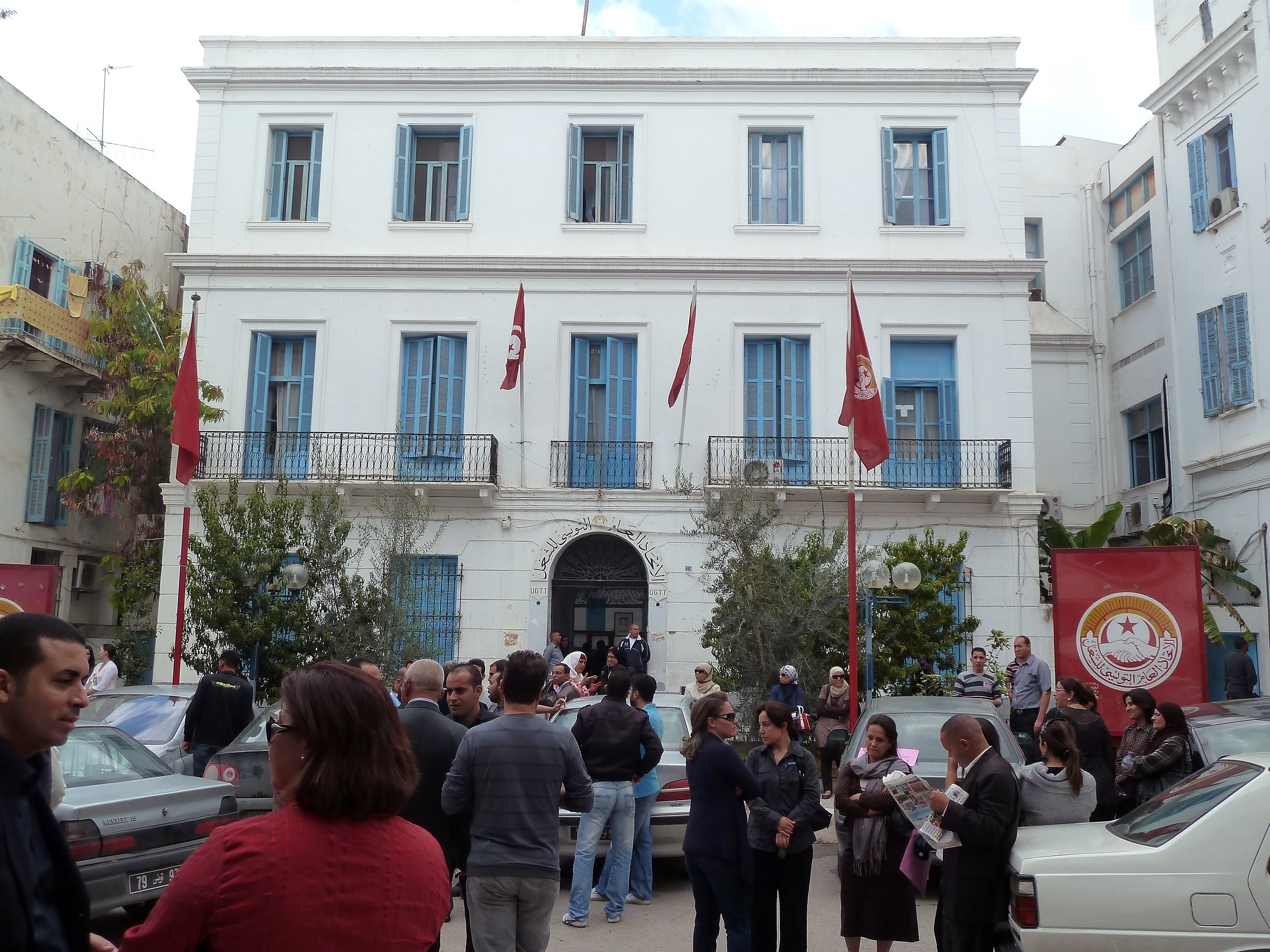
Seat of UGTT in Tunis

- 1946–1952: Farhat Hached
- 1952–1952: Mahmoud Messadi
- 1952–1954: Mohamed Kraïem
- 1954–1956: Ahmed Ben Salah
- 1956–1963: Ahmed Tlili
- 1963–1965: Habib Achour
- 1965–1970: Béchir Bellagha
- 1970–1978: Habib Achour
- 1978–1981: Tijani Abid
- 1981–1984: Taieb Baccouche
- 1984–1989: Habib Achour
- 1989–2000: Ismaïl Sahbani
- 2000–2011: Abdessalem Jerad
- 2011–2017: Houcine Abassi
- 2017–2026: Noureddine Taboubi
- 2026-present: Salaheddine Selmi
