= Tunisian Human Rights League =

Tunisian human rights organisation

- Arabic: الرابطة التونسية للدفاع عن حقوق الإنسان; French: Ligue tunisienne des droits de l'homme
- Formation: 1976
- Type: Human rights organization
- Region served: Tunisia
- Members: 3,000 (1985)
- Affiliations: Tunisian National Dialogue Quartet

The Tunisian Human Rights League (Arabic: الرابطة التونسية للدفاع عن حقوق الإنسان, romanized: al-Rābiṭah al-Tūnisīyah lil-Difāʻ ʻan Ḥuqūq al-Insān, French: Ligue tunisienne des droits de l'homme, or LTDH) is an association to observe and defend human rights in Tunisia. It was founded in 1976, but associations had to be government-recognized, and the government delayed considerably before giving official recognition in May 1977. The organization's name is usually abbreviated LTDH, for its French name.

Hassib Ben Ammar was an early organizer who later received a United Nations Prize in the Field of Human Rights. Saâdeddine Zmerli was the first president and a longtime officer from the beginning of the organization till the year 2000. Mohamed Charfi is also a cofounder.

LDTH had about 1,000 members in 1982 and 3,000 in 1985, partly because it had taken stands against the death penalty and the release from prison of Islamists who had been "imprisoned for acts of conscience."

"Four of its leaders, including two of its founders and its first two presidents" were made ministers in the 1987 Tunisian government.

The National Dialogue Quartet, comprising the Tunisian Human Rights League, the Tunisian General Labour Union, the Tunisian Confederation of Industry, Trade and Handicrafts and the Tunisian Order of Lawyers, was announced as the laureate of the 2015 Nobel Peace Prize "for its decisive contribution to the building of a pluralistic democracy in Tunisia in the wake of the Jasmine Revolution of 2011."

== See also ==
- Human rights in Tunisia
