= Tunisian Order of Lawyers =

- Arabic: الهيئة الوطنية للمحامين بتونس; French: Ordre National des Avocats de Tunisie
- Type: Lawyers' association
- Headquarters: Tunis
- Region served: Tunisia
- President: Boubaker Bethabet
- Affiliations: Tunisian National Dialogue Quartet
- Website: avocat.org.tn/fr/ (in French)

The Tunisian Order of Lawyers (Arabic: الهيئة الوطنية للمحامين بتونس, French: Ordre National des Avocats de Tunisie) is a non-profit Tunisian organization and the bar association of the country. All lawyers in Tunisia are members of the Order, which does not belong to any political party. The headquarters of the Order are located in Tunis. The Tunisian National Dialogue Quartet, of which the Tunisian Order of Lawyers forms part, was announced as the laureate of the 2015 Nobel Peace Prize on October 9, 2015, for its role building a constitutional democracy following the Tunisian revolution.

In July 2015, the president of the Order was Mohamed Fadhel Mahfoudh. In September 2025, the president was Boubaker Bethabet.

== Members ==
- Abdelmonem Achour
