= 2015 Nobel Peace Prize =

- Tunisian National Dialogue Quartet
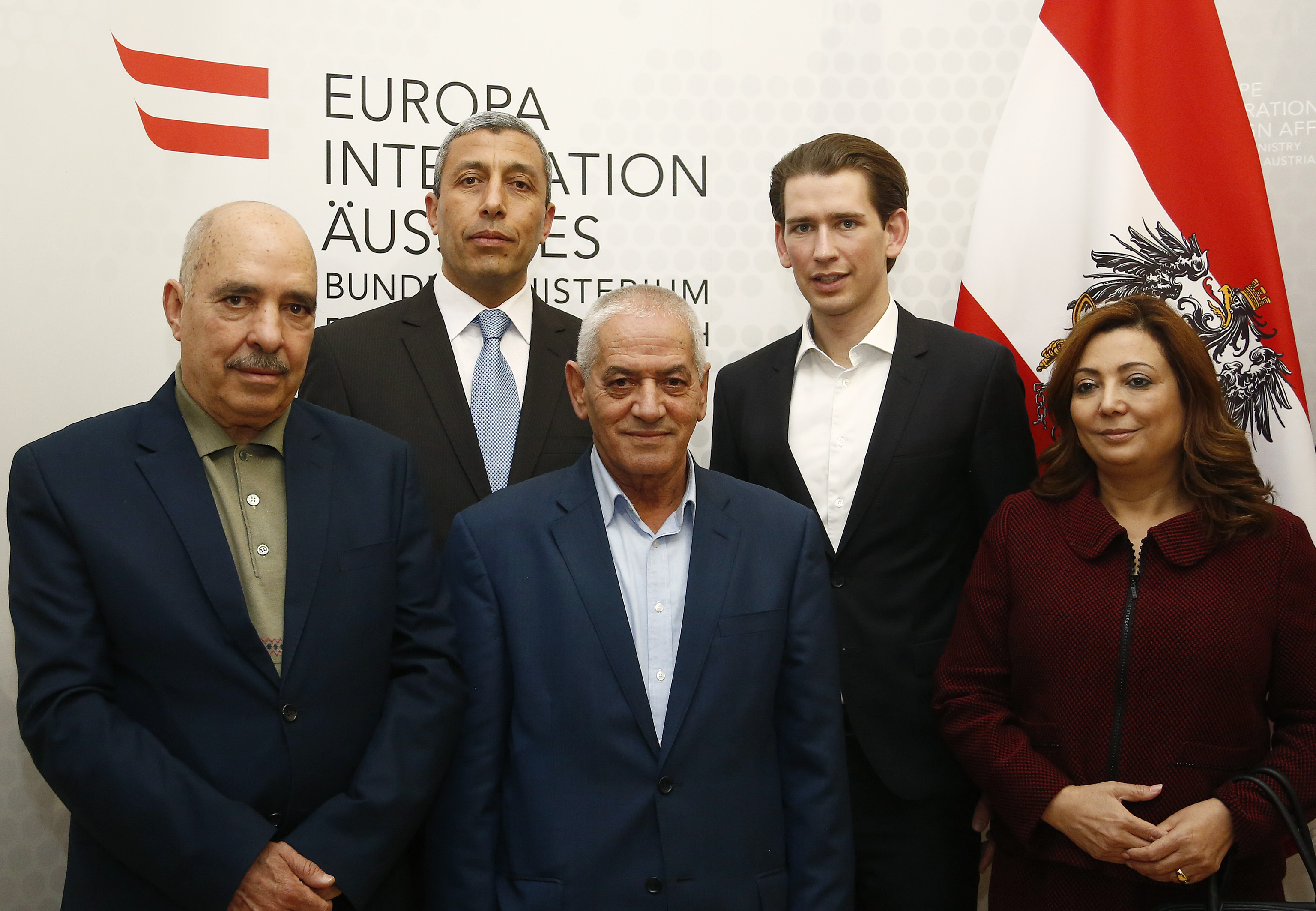
- "for its decisive contribution to the building of a pluralistic democracy in Tunisia in the wake of the Jasmine Revolution of 2011."
- Date: 9 October 2015 (announcement by Kaci Kullmann Five); 10 December 2015 (ceremony)
- Location: Oslo, Norway
- Presented by: Norwegian Nobel Committee
- Rewards: 8 million SEK ($1M, €0.9M)
- First award: 1901
- Website: Official website

The 2015 Nobel Peace Prize was awarded to the Tunisian National Dialogue Quartet (founded in 2013) for "its decisive contribution to the building of a pluralistic democracy in Tunisia in the wake of the Jasmine Revolution of 2011".

The National Dialogue Quartet was formed in 2013 and comprises four organizations in Tunisian civil society:

- The Tunisian General Labour Union (UGTT, Union Générale Tunisienne du Travail)
- The Tunisian Confederation of Industry, Trade and Handicrafts (UTICA, Union Tunisienne de l’Industrie, du Commerce et de l’Artisanat)
- The Tunisian Human Rights League (LTDH, La Ligue Tunisienne pour la Défense des Droits de l’Homme)
- The Tunisian Order of Lawyers (Ordre National des Avocats de Tunisie).

The Nobel Peace Prize is awarded annually to those who have "done the most or the best work for fraternity between nations, for the abolition or reduction of standing armies and for the holding and promotion of peace congresses".

Tunisian singer/songwriter Emel Mathlouthi sang Kelmti Horra during the award ceremony at City Hall in Oslo, Norway, on December 11, 2015.

== Nominations ==
The Norwegian Nobel Committee received 273 different nominations for the Peace Prize. 68 of these nominations were for organizations and 205 for persons. It is the second highest number of candidates as of 2015, after 278 in 2014.

Many news media speculated about who would be awarded. The award was a surprise to many. Media favourites included German Chancellor Angela Merkel for admitting large numbers of refugees and migrants to Germany in the European migrant crisis, American and Iranian foreign ministers John Kerry and Mohammad Javad Zarif for the Iran nuclear deal, Pope Francis for his assistance in the United States–Cuban Thaw, Colombian President Juan Manuel Santos and FARC guerrilla leader Timoleón Jiménez for the peace process in the Colombian conflict, and Congolese gynecologist Denis Mukwege who treats victims of sexual violence and has been nominated for this before.

The Venezuelan human rights organization Foro Penal, which provides legal assistance pro bono to people subject of arbitrary detentions and their relatives in the country, was also nominated by 36 Chilean deputies, academics and representatives of other parliaments.

== Committee ==
The Nobel Peace Prize is awarded by the Norwegian Nobel Committee. For the 2015 award, the members were:

- Kaci Kullmann Five (chair since March 2015, born 1951), former member of Parliament and cabinet minister for the Conservative Party. Member of the committee since 2003.
- Berit Reiss-Andersen (deputy chair, born 1954), advocate (barrister) and president of the Norwegian Bar Association, former state secretary for the Minister of Justice and the Police (representing the Labour Party). Member of the Committee since 2011.
- Inger-Marie Ytterhorn (1941–2021), member of Parliament for the Progress Party. Member of the committee since 2000.
- Thorbjørn Jagland (born 1950), former Member of Parliament and President of the Storting and former prime minister for the Labour Party, current secretary general of the Council of Europe. Chair of the committee from 2009 to March 2015.
- Henrik Syse (born 1966), research professor at the Peace Research Institute Oslo. Member of the committee since 2015.

== See also ==
- List of Nobel Peace Prize laureates
- List of Nobel laureates by country
