= Man of Peace =

- Awarded for: World peace award
- Location: Rome
- Country: Italy
- First award: 1999
- Website: nobelforpeace-summits.org

The Man of Peace is an award conceptualized in 1999 by the annual World Summit of Nobel Peace Laureates in Rome. The purpose of the award is to recognize individuals who "from personalities from the world of culture and entertainment who have stood up for human rights and for the spread of the principles of Peace and Solidarity in the world, made an outstanding contribution to international social justice and peace".

The award was an initiative by former Soviet leader Mikhail Gorbachev, himself a winner of a Nobel Peace Prize. It is presented in Rome's Campidoglio (Capitoline Hill) by Gorbachev, Walter Veltroni, Mayor of Rome, and the Nobel Peace Prize Laureates attending the annual summit meeting.

In its early years the award was referred to as both the "Man for Peace" in Europe and "Man of Peace" in the United States. In 2006 its title was officially changed to "Man of Peace", also "Peace Summit Award".

== Recipients ==
- 2002: Roberto Benigni
- 2003: Italian National Singers' Football Team
- 2004: Cat Stevens
- 2005: Bob Geldof and The PeaceJam Foundation
- 2006: Peter Gabriel
- 2007: Don Cheadle and George Clooney
- 2008: Bono
- 2009: Annie Lennox
- 2010: Roberto Baggio
- 2012: Sean Penn
- 2013: Sharon Stone
- 2014: Bernardo Bertolucci
- 2015: Rene Perez

== Peace Summit Award for Social Activism ==
In addition, the conference also awarded the "Peace Summit Award for Social Activism" to "associations which have distinguished themselves for their outstanding contribution to international peace and social justice".

- 2005: PeaceJam
- 2010: Nihon Hidankyo

== Summit members ==
=== 1999 ===
- Mikhail Gorbachev (1990)
- Joseph Rotblat (1995)
- Betty Williams (1976)
- Rigoberta Menchú (1992)
- Shimon Peres (1994)
- Frederik Willem de Klerk (1993)
- David Trimble (1998)

=== 2000 ===
- Mikhail Gorbachev (1990)
- Joseph Rotblat (1995)
- Betty Williams (1976)
- Lech Wałęsa (1983)
- Adolfo Pérez Esquivel (1980)

=== 2002 ===
- Mikhail Gorbachev (1990)
- Joseph Rotblat (1995)
- Adolfo Pérez Esquivel (1980)
- Betty Williams (1976)
- Lech Wałęsa (1983)
- Rigoberta Menchú (1992)

=== 2003 ===
- Mikhail Gorbachev (1990)
- Joseph Rotblat (represented by Robert Hinde) (1995)
- Betty Williams and Mairead Maguire (1976)
- Lech Wałęsa (1983)
- 14th Dalai Lama (1989)
- Shimon Peres (1994)
- Óscar Arias (1987)
- Médecins Sans Frontières (1999)

=== 2004 ===
- Mikhail Gorbachev(1990)
- 14th Dalai Lama(1989)
- Kim Dae-jung (2000)
- Shimon Peres (1994)
- Lech Wałęsa (1983)
- José Ramos-Horta (1996)
- Betty Williams (1976)
- Mairead Maguire (1976)
- Rigoberta Menchù Tum (1992)
- Carlos Filipe Ximenes Belo (1996)
- Adolfo Pérez Esquivel (1980)
- Joseph Rotblat (1995)
- American Friends Service Committee (1947)
- International Campaign to Ban Landmines (1997)
- United Nations Children's Fund (UNICEF) (1965)
- United Nations High Commissioner for Refugees (1955, 1981)
- Pugwash Conferences on Science and World Affairs (1995)
- International Physicians for the Prevention of Nuclear War (1985)
- International Labour Organization (1969)
- International Peace Bureau (1910)
- Institut de Droit International (1904)
- Médecins Sans Frontières (1999)
- United Nations (1988, 2001)
- Amnesty International (1977)

=== 2005 ===
- Mairead Maguire (1976)
- Frederik Willem de Klerk (1993)
- Mikhail Gorbachev (1990)
- Rigoberta Menchú (1992)
- Adolfo Pérez Esquivel (1980)
- Lech Wałęsa (1983)
- Betty Williams (1976)
- Nelson Mandela, represented by John Samuels (1993)
- American Friends Service Committee (1947)
- Amnesty International (1977)
- International Campaign to Ban Landmines (1997)
- International Labour Organization (1969)
- Institut de Droit International (1904)
- International Peace Bureau (1910)
- International Physicians for the Prevention of Nuclear War (1985)
- Médecins Sans Frontières (1999)
- Pugwash Conferences on Science and World Affairs (1995)
- United Nations Children's Fund (UNICEF) (1965)
- United Nations High Commissioner for Refugees (1955, 1981)
- United Nations (1988, 2001)

== Bibliography ==
- Alberto Abruzzese – Morando Morandini, Dietro lo spot Franco Scepi gira Campari, Mazzotta Editore, Milano 1986
- Gillo Dorfles – Massimo Di Forti Franco Scepi, Images from Italy, Mazzotta Editore, Milano 1987
- Marc Le Cannu – Gillo Dorfles, Over ad Art da Depero a Scepi, Editore Electa Milano 1989
- Franco Scepi produzione d’immagini, Edizione CDS Milano 1990
- Trent'anni e un Secolo di Casa Campari, Guido Vergani, 1990
- Franco Scepi, Over Ad' Art, Editore Alex Gallery Washington, 1993
- Franco Scepi, Strategia dell’immaginazione Edizioni l’Artistica Savigliano 1992
- AA. VV., Mikhail Gorbachev: Arte per la pace - oltre ogni muro, l’Uomo della Pace di Scepi Bora edizioni, Bologna 2000, ISBN 88-85345-79-4
- Man for Peace, Tipleco Editore, 2003
- Man for Peace, Sambero Editore, 2004 e 2005
- Percorso nel Tempo, l'antica Casa di Franco Scepi, Sambero Editore, 2006
