= Carl von Ossietzky Medal =

German human rights award

The Internationale Liga für Menschenrechte (Berlin) (ILMR) has awarded the Carl von Ossietzky Medal since 1962. The league has honored personalities, initiatives or organizations who have worked with civil courage and outstanding commitment to the realization of human rights annually since 1962 and at least once every two years from 2011 with the Carl von Ossietzky Medal it donated. The award is named after the German pacifist and Nobel Peace Prize laureate Carl von Ossietzky, who died in 1938 as a result of imprisonment in a concentration camp.

== Recipients ==
- 1962: Otto Lehmann-Russbüldt
- 1963: Rudolf Küstermeier
- 1964: Joseph Wulf
- 1965: Heinrich Grüber
- 1966: Fritz von Unruh
- 1967: Günter Grass
- 1968: Kai Hermann
- 1969: Robert Kempner
- 1970: Walter Fabian
- 1971: Walter Schulze for the Internationaler Arbeitskreis Sonnenberg
- 1972: Carola Stern – Amnesty International
- 1973: Helmut Gollwitzer
- 1974: Heinrich Böll
- 1975: Heinrich Albertz
- 1976: Betty Williams, Mairead Corrigan, Ciaran McKeown for Peace People, Ireland
- 1977: Willi Bleicher, Dr. Helmut Simon
- 1978: Rudolf Bahro
- 1979: Fritz Eberhard, Axel Eggebrecht
- 1980: Ingeborg Drewitz
- 1981: Gert Bastian
- 1982: William Borm
- 1983: Heinz Brandt, Martin Niemöller
- 1984: Günter Wallraff
- 1985: Lea Rosh
- 1986: Erich Fried
- 1987: Eberhard Carl, Eckart Rottka, Imme Storsberg – Richter und Staatsanwälte für den Frieden
- 1988: Klaus Bednarz
- 1989: Antje Vollmer, Friedrich Schorlemmer
- 1990: Konrad Weiß
- 1991: Liselotte Funcke
- 1992: Wolfgang Richter, Thomas Euting, Dietmar Schumann, Thomas Höper, Jürgen Podzkiewitz, Jochen Schmidt – ZDF editorial team Kennzeichen D
- 1993: Aziz Nesin, Karl Finke
- 1994: Volker Ludwig and the Grips-Theater Berlin
- 1995: Jacob Finci for La Benevolencija; Hans Koschnick
- 1996: The Saturday women of Istanbul
- 1997: Hannes Heer for the team of the exhibition Wehrmachtsausstellung
- 1998: Madjiguène Cissé und Les Collectifs des SANS-PAPIERS
- 1999: Simin Behbahani und Monireh Baradaran
- 2000: Brandenburger Flüchtlingsinitiative, Association Opferperspektive and Tagesspiegel editor Frank Jansen
- 2001: Ökumenische Bundesarbeitsgemeinschaft Asyl in der Kirche
- 2002: Eberhard Radczuweit und Marina Schubarth for their work at KONTAKTE-Контакты e.V., Association for contacts with countries of the former Soviet Union
- 2003: publicist Gerit von Leitner and the citizens' initiative Freie Heide
- 2004: Percy MacLean, Esther Béjarano, Peter Gingold, Martin Löwenberg
- 2005: Mechthild Niesen-Bolm and Inge Wannagat and the leisure and advice center Die Arche – Christliches Kinder- und Jugendwerk in Berlin
- 2006: lawyer Bernhard Docke and major Florian Pfaff
- 2007: Legal Team/Emergency lawyer service for the G8 protests in Heiligendamm
- 2008: The Palestinian village's Bil'in Citizens Committee and the Anarchists Against the Wall
- 2009: Mouctar Bah and Stefan Schmidt, Captain of the Cap Anamur
- 2010: Mordechai Vanunu
- 2011: no award
- 2012: Peter Lilienthal
- 2013: no award
- 2014: Edward Snowden, Laura Poitras und Glenn Greenwald
- 2015: no award
- 2016: SOS Méditerranée und Kai Wiedenhöfer
- 2018: Leyla İmret und social worker Ottmar Miles-Paul
- 2020: Otfried Nassauer

== Gallery ==
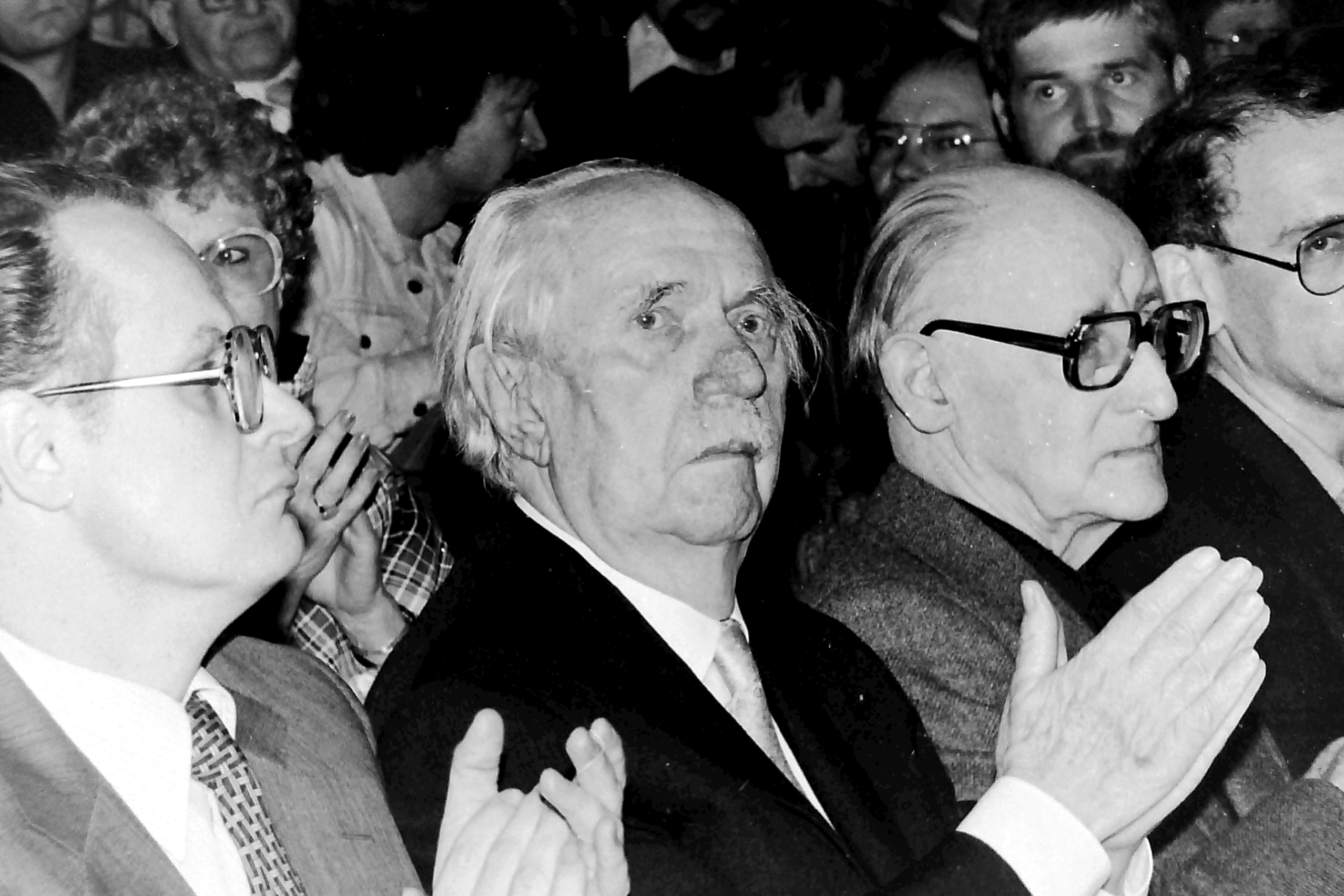
Fritz Eberhard at the award ceremony of the Carl von Ossietzky Medal, 1979

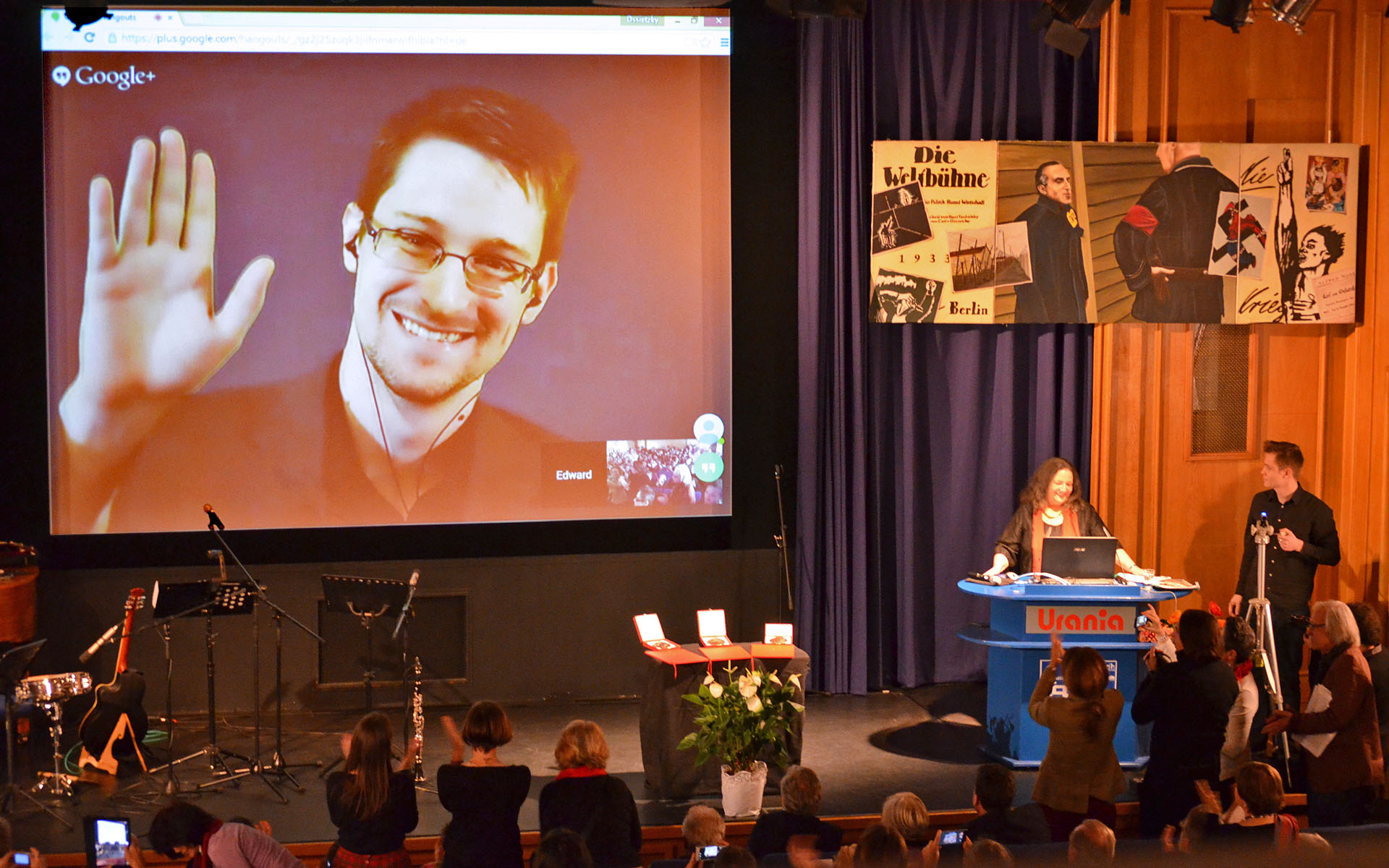
Edward Snowden appears via video at the International League for Human Rights 2014 awards ceremony
