= Dawn Gifford Engle =

American peace activist & film director

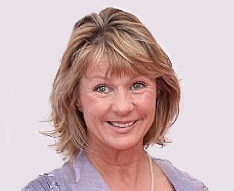
- Born: Dawn Gifford Engle; May 22, 1957 (age 69)
- Occupation: Executive Director of the PeaceJam Foundation/Director of the Nobel Legacy Film Series
- Awards: Make a Difference; Ambassadors of Peace; Man of Peace; Women of Distinction Award; National Youth Leadership Council; Best Director, The Modcon London Film Festival; Documentary Filmmaker of the Year IFFDSC; 2016 Best Documentary Director, Harlem International Film Festival; 2020 Best Director in a Doc; Documentary Screenplay, Five Continents International Film Festival

Dawn Engle (born May 22, 1957) is the co-founder and former executive director of the non-profit PeaceJam Foundation.

The PeaceJam program was founded in February 1996 by Engle and her husband Ivan Suvanjieff to provide the Nobel Peace Prize Laureates with a programmatic vehicle to use in working together to teach youth the art of peace. To date, 14 Nobel Peace Laureates, serve as members of the PeaceJam Foundation. To date, over one million young people from 40 countries around the world have participated in the year long PeaceJam curricular program. Engle and Suvanjieff have been nominated for the Nobel Peace Prize seventeen times, and they were leading contenders for the 2015 Nobel Peace Prize.

Engle is the co-director of multiple documentaries, including PEACEJAM, and co-author of the book PeaceJam: A Billion Simple Acts of Peace that was published by Penguin in 2008. She has also directed the documentary films, Mayan Renaissance, Desmond Tutu: Children of the Light, Adolfo Perez Esquivel: Rivers of Hope, Rigoberta Menchu: Daughter of the Maya, and Oscar Arias: Without A Shot Fired, Betty Williams: Contagious Courage, The Dalai Lama: Scientist, and Shirin Ebadi: Until We Are Free.

== History ==
Engle began her career as an economist, working for the United States Congress in Washington, D.C. for twelve years, first as a research assistant to Senator Robert Griffin, and then as Legislative Assistant to Congressman Jack Kemp and as Legislative Director to Senator Robert Kasten. In 1986, she was promoted to Kasten's Chief of Staff, becoming the youngest woman ever to serve in that position for a Senator. She also served as an assistant director of the Republican Platform Committee.

In 1991, she co-founded the Colorado Friends of Tibet, and in 1994, she and Suvanjieff began working together to create the PeaceJam program. They married in March 2001, with Archbishop Desmond Tutu presiding over the ceremony. Engle has received dozens of awards, and has been nominated seventeen times for the Nobel Peace Prize. In November 2005, President Mikhail Gorbachev presented her and Suvanjieff with the Man of Peace Award for achievement in the field of Peace Education.

Since 1996, over one million young people across the globe have participated in the PeaceJam program, creating more than two million projects to improve their communities and the world. In September 2008, The Dalai Lama, Archbishop Desmond Tutu, Jody Williams, Shirin Ebadi, and six other Nobel Peace Laureates joined to launch PeaceJam's One Billion Acts of Peace campaign, calling for one billion acts of service and peace by the year 2019. in January 2015, the campaign received seven Nobel Peace Prize nominations.
