= Mayan Renaissance =

2012 film by Dawn Engle

- Film title credit
- Directed by: Dawn Engle
- Written by: Dawn Engle
- Produced by: PeaceJam
- Starring: Rigoberta Menchú; Adolfo Pérez Esquivel; Rosalina Tuyuc; Jody Williams
- Release date: May 16, 2012
- Running time: 68 minutes
- Countries: United States; Guatemala
- Languages: English and Spanish, with subtitles

Mayan Renaissance is a 2012 American documentary film by director Dawn Engle about the Maya peoples of Guatemala and Central America. It describes the ancient Maya civilization, the conquest by Spain during the 1520s, hundreds of years of oppression, and the modern struggle by Mayans for self-determination and a Mayan renaissance.

== History ==
Its première screening at the United Nations Headquarters was on 16 May 2012 and its broadcast première on Colorado Public Television was on 6 June 2012.

The film contains interviews of 1992 Nobel Peace Prize winner, Rigoberta Menchú, a Mayan indigenous rights activist and politician, and other Guatemalan and foreign contributors. It was awarded the Best Colorado Filmmaker Documentary Award at The Film Festival of Colorado in July 2012. The documentary is the first of a planned ten-part Nobel Legacy Film Series.

== Cast ==
- Rigoberta Menchú
- Javier Payeras
- Adolfo Pérez Esquivel
- Rosalina Tuyuc
- Jody Williams
- Elisa Facio
- María Faviana Cochoy Alva
- Gerardo Gutiérrez
- Luz Méndez
- Claudia Samayoa
- Pedro Celestino Yac Noj

=== Additional cast ===
- José Basillas
- Benjamin Borjes
- Anibal Garcia
- Sandra Monterroso
- José Antonio Otaolaurruchi
- Fernando Rodas
- David Rutherford (voice)
