= 1976 Andersonstown incident =

Brief altercation between the IRA and British Army

1976 Andersonstown-Finaghy incident
- Part of the Troubles
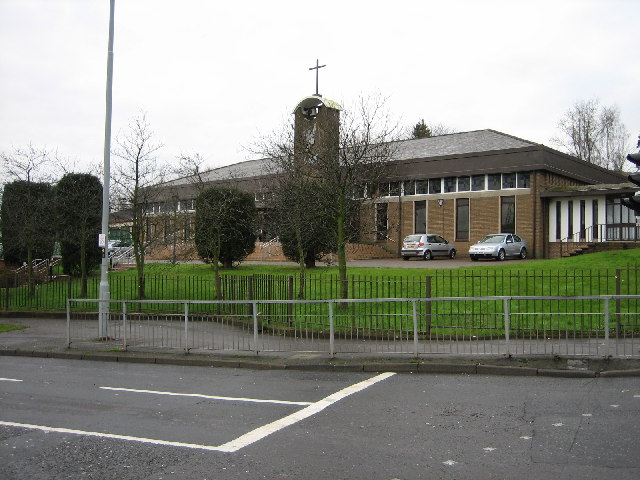
- Church of Saint Michael around 250 feet from where the hijacked car crashed
Date	10 August 1976
Location	Belfast, County Antrim, Northern Ireland 54°34.18′N 5°59.41′W

Belligerents
Provisional IRA: Belfast Brigade	United Kingdom: British Army

Strength
5 IRA men 1 Ford Cortina	1 foot patrol 2 Land Rovers

Casualties and losses
1 killed and 1 injured	None
- 3 civilians killed and 1 injured
- Location within Northern Ireland

The 1976 Andersonstown incident or the 1976 Andersonstown-Finaghy incident, was a brief altercation between members of the Provisional IRA and the British Army, in Andersonstown and North Finaghy in August 1976, which resulted in the deaths of three children who were killed when a car struck them after the man driving was shot and killed.

== Incident ==
On 10 August 1976 a member of the Provisional IRA Belfast Brigade, Danny Lennon (22) stole a light blue Ford Cortina at the Centra Moneen Filling Station on the corner of Andersonstown Road and Finaghy Road North. Lennon then went to pick up fellow IRA member John 'Sean-Glas' Chillingworth. The two men would then meet up with three other IRA members. Lennon was planning to deliver his broken ArmaLite rifle which was a gift from Bobby Sands, because Lennon had supplied Sands with explosives which were later used in a landmine attack on the British Army.

Shortly before 2.30 p.m. gunfire was exchanged between the three men and soldiers in a Land Rover and foot patrol of the King's Own Royal Border Regiment, the three men would go down Rossnareen Avenue, where they successfully evaded the pursuing soldiers by going through some estates, but Lennon and Chillingworth were still being pursued by one of the Land Rovers, Lennon would drive down Shaw's Road and Andersonstown Road and then finally down Finaghy Road North.

While on Finaghy Road North, Chillingworth allegedly pointed the broken rifle at the Land Rover and in response the soldiers opened fire on the Cortina, instantly killing Lennon and injuring Chillingworth, who was shot in the leg and abdomen. The car then mounted the pavement, pinning four members of the Maguire family against a metal fence outside the St. John the Baptist Primary School near the intersection of Finaghy Road North and Brenda Park and the Church of Saint Michael the Archangel. The crash would kill Andrew (6 weeks) who was still in his pram, Joanne (8) who was riding a bicycle and John Maguire (2); Andrew and Joanne died instantly while John died the next day; the only one to have survived the crash was the children’s mother Anne Maguire (31) who suffered severe leg and pelvic injuries as well as brain damage and was unconscious for several days, while Mark Maguire (7) narrowly escaped being hit by the Cortina, as he was a few yards ahead of the rest of his family.

=== Danny Lennon ===
Daniel "Danny" Lennon was born on 11 November 1953 in Belfast. His mother Eileen Lennon was a member of Cumann na mBan, and was in the Belfast Brigade. Lennon would get involved in the Provisional IRA in August 1971 and would also join the Provisional IRA Belfast Brigade. For a time he was known as Andersonstown's most wanted man. He was arrested in October 1972 and was released just under four years later in 30 April 1976.

== Aftermath ==
Two days after the incident, Anne's sister Mairead Corrigan and her neighbour who also witnessed the incident Betty Williams founded the Women for Peace, which was later renamed to the Peace People when Ciaran McKeown became involved in the group. Corrigan and Williams then held a petition for peace that had over 6,000 signatures and led a peaceful march to the children’s graves at the Church of Saint Michael the Archangel, but had to stop due to angered protesters.

On 5 December 1976 the Community of Peace People began two marches in Belfast and Dublin, the marchers would meet on the Bridge of Peace in Drogheda. Over 35,000 people participated in the marches.

Corrigan and Williams were awarded the 1976 Nobel Peace Prize for their activism to end the conflict in Northern Ireland.

The Maguire family would come to Lennon's defence saying they didn't see him as responsible for the deaths of Joanne, John and Andrew.

In April 2009 a memorial plaque containing the names of several Provisional IRA members including Danny Lennon, was defaced. His brother Sean “Ginty” Lennon would condemn the attack.

=== Suicide of Anne Maguire ===
Anne Maguire (née Corrigan: born 1945) and her husband John 'Jackie' Maguire emigrated to New Zealand with their son Mark in 1977 and had another daughter. The family then emigrated back to Belfast 18 months later after Anne had a nervous breakdown. The family also had another child after their emigration back to Northern Ireland.

On 18 January 1980, while the family were preparing for a three day trip to Cambodia, Anne took her own life by slitting her wrists and throat with an electric carving knife in their flat on Cavehill Road.

A year after Anne's death, Mairead married Anne’s widower Jackie on 8 September 1981; their wedding was held in Rome.
