= Atong Amos Agook Juac =

South Sudanese businesswoman and philanthropist

- Born: August 4, 1991 (age 35); Sudan
- Occupations: Businesswoman; Philanthropist
- Agent: BM Publications/Brian Muhumuza Bishanga
- Known for: Founder and CEO of Triple A Group Ltd

Atong Amos Agook Juac (born 4 August 1991) is a South Sudanese businesswoman and philanthropist. She is the founder and chief executive officer of Triple A Group Ltd, an energy and logistics company operating in South Sudan.

== Early life ==
Atong Amos Agook Juac was born on 4 August 1991 in Sudan. Her mother is a member of the South Sudanese parliament.

== Career ==
=== Government and non-profit sectors ===
Juac served as an office manager in the Office of the President of South Sudan during the administration of Salva Kiir. In the non-governmental sector, she served as the executive director of the Aliab Rural Development Agency (ARUDA), also known as the Assistance Relief and Development Agency. In 2017, she was part of the delegation that oversaw the handover of a Japan-funded Women Empowerment Centre in Mingkaman, Awerial County.

Between 2018 and 2019, she served as a Women Peace and Security Advisor for the Nobel Women's Initiative.

=== Business ===
Juac established Gold Orchid Events Management Ltd and has served as CEO of DA-Global Security Services Company Limited. In 2021, she founded Triple A Group Ltd, which provides services in petroleum distribution, security, logistics, and hospitality. In 2023, the company expanded its operations by launching a line of lubricant products at the African Energy Week in Cape Town.

== Philanthropy ==
During the 2023 conflict in Sudan, Juac's company, Triple A Group, organized the evacuation of over 180 South Sudanese citizens from Paloch to Juba. Following the evacuation, the group provided aid, including food and medical supplies, in coordination with humanitarian organizations.

== Awards and recognition ==
- Forty Under 40 Africa Award in the Oil and Gas category (2023).
