= Madjiguène =

Madjiguène or Madjiguene is the Frenchified spelling of the Wolof female given name Maajigéen (from jigéen 'woman'). Notable people with the name include:

- Anna Madgigine Jai Kingsley (born Anta Madjiguène Ndiaye; 1793–1870), West African slave turned slave owner in Cuba
- Madjiguène Cissé (1951–2023), Senegalese immigrants rights activist
- Madjiguene Sene (born 1994), Senegalese basketball player
- Youssou "Madjiguène" N'Dour (born 1959), Senegalese singer, songwriter, musician and politician
