= Klaus Bednarz =

German journalist and writer (1942–2015)

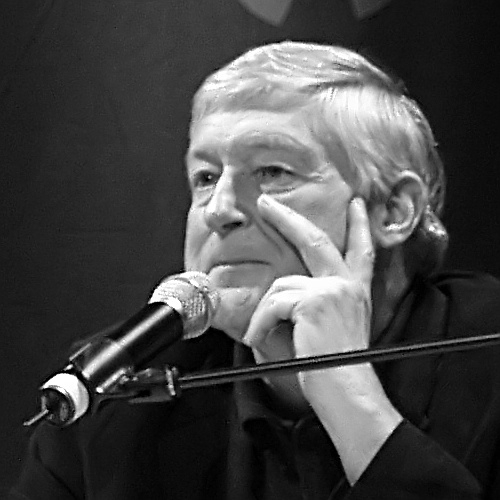
Klaus Bednarz at lit.COLOGNE 2007

Klaus Bednarz (6 June 1942 – 14 April 2015) was a German journalist and writer.

== Life ==
Bednarz was born in Falkensee, Province of Brandenburg. He studied Slavic studies, theatre and Eastern European history at universities in Hamburg, Vienna and Moscow. His dissertation at university was on Russian author Anton Chekhov. Since 1967 Bednarz worked for German television as correspondent in Poland (1971–1977) and in the Soviet Union (1977–1982). Later he was television presenter of the German TV programme Monitor, broadcast by Westdeutscher Rundfunk. During these years Bednarz wrote several books on Eastern European countries and the south of South America. He died in Schwerin, Mecklenburg-Vorpommern.

== Works ==
=== Books ===
- 1977: Poland
- 1979: The old Moscow
- 1980: Heinrich Böll and Lew Kopelew in discussion with Klaus Bednarz
- 1984: Masuren
- 1985: My Moscow
- 1989: Poland
- 1990: Travelguide Moscow
- 1990: Gorbachev
- 1992: Russia
- 1995: Far near country – Meetings in Ostpreußen
- 1997: About authors and books
- 1998: The Ballad of Lake Baikal
- 2002: East from sun – From Lake Baikal to Alaska
- 2004: At the end of the world – Journey through Tierra del Fuego and Patagonia
- 2006: My Russia
- 2007: The cross of North. Journey through Karelien
- 2009: Far and near: About my life as journalist

== Awards ==
- 1982 and 1985: Adolf-Grimme-Preis
- 1986: Joseph E. Drexel Award
- 1987: BUND journalists award
- 1988: Carl von Ossietzky Medal
- 1991: Goldene Kamera in category Best news speaker for Monitor
- 1992: Deutscher Kritikerpreis
- 1993: Civis media prize
- 1995: Telestar "Best reporter documentation/news" for Die Reise nach Ostpreußen
- 1999: DUH environment media award
- 2003: Gold medaille by international film- and TV festival Jalta
