= Kai Wiedenhöfer =

German photographer (1966–2024)

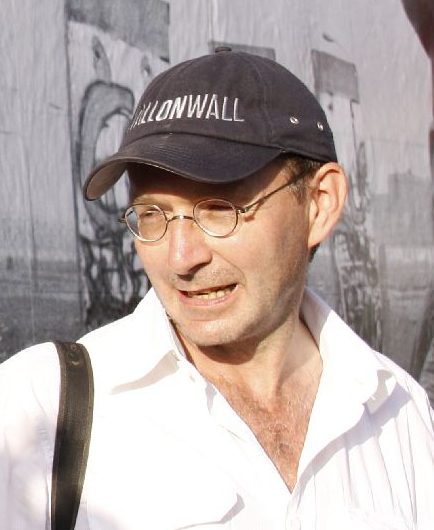
- Wiedenhöfer in 2013
- Born: March 3, 1966; Schwenningen
- Died: January 9, 2024 (aged 57)
- Education: Folkwang University of the Arts
- Known for: Photography
- Awards: W. Eugene Smith Grant; 2002; Carl von Ossietzky Medal; 2016
- Website: kaiwiedenhoefer.com

Kai Wiedenhöfer (3 March 1966 – 9 January 2024) was a German photojournalist. Two major subjects of his work were Palestinian life and separation barriers. Wiedenhöfer received the W. Eugene Smith Grant, the Carmignac Photojournalism Award and the Carl von Ossietzky Medal. He had a solo exhibition at the Musée d'Art Moderne de Paris in 2010, documenting the consequences of Israel's war against Gaza.

== Early life and education ==
Wiedenhöfer was born in Schwenningen, Schwarzwald-Baar district in southern Baden-Württemberg, Germany. His mother was a pharmacist and his father a mechanic. He grew up in the countryside and after the death of his father in 1981, moved to a small town near Stuttgart. He studied documentary photography and editorial design at Folkwang University of the Arts in Essen, graduating in 1995.

== Life and work ==
Wiedenhöfer documented Palestinian life for almost two decades, publishing the books Perfect Peace (2002), Wall (2007), and The Book of Destruction (2010). The latter book:

"is unquestionably about violence, documenting in almost unbearable detail the damage left after Israel's assault on Gaza in 2009. Unpeopled images of ruined buildings, photographed with an architectural precision, are contrasted with portraits of equally ruined people with truncated limbs and scarred bodies. His human subjects look into the camera, seated in their own homes".

He spent decades photographing all the major separation barriers, including the Berlin Wall, the Israeli West Bank barrier, the United Nations Buffer Zone in Cyprus, the Mexico–United States border wall, the Baghdad Wall, and the peace lines in Belfast. He has said:

"One of the things that links all the walls and barriers is the insistence by those who build them that each wall is unique and that you cannot compare the different walls, [. . .] But the point I am trying to make is different. It's that what connects all these walls is a problem you cannot solve through negotiation, so you build a wall and make the problem worse."

The combination of the fall of one wall and construction of another inspired Wiedenhöfer to create Wall on Wall, a display of large images of the Israeli separation wall on the remnants of the Berlin Wall at the outdoor East Side Gallery; and later three dozen large images of barriers from around the world displayed on the peace lines in Belfast.

In 2024, he died after a heart attack while cycling in Swabia, age 57.

== Publications ==
- Perfect Peace: the Palestinians from Intifada to Intifada. Göttingen, Germany: Steidl, 2002. ISBN 3-88243-814-2.
- Wall. Göttingen, Germany: Steidl, 2007. ISBN 978-3-86521-117-0.
- Checkpoint Huwara. Neue Zürcher Zeitung, 2008. With Karin Wenger. ISBN 978-3-7205-3077-4.
- The Book of Destruction. Göttingen, Germany: Steidl, 2010. ISBN 978-3-86930-207-2.
- Confrontier: Borders: 1989–2012. Göttingen, Germany: Steidl, 2013. ISBN 978-3-86930-550-9.
- Forty Out of One Million: the Human Cost of the Syrian War. MW Photoprojects, 2015.
- Syrian Collateral. Dortmund, Germany: Kettler, 2016. German-language version. ISBN 978-3862065882.
- Wall and Peace. Göttingen, Germany: Steidl, 2019.

== Awards ==
- 2001: 3rd prize, People in the News category, 2002 World Press Photo Contest, Amsterdam, Netherlands
- 2002: W. Eugene Smith Grant from the W. Eugene Smith Memorial Fund, USA
- 2003: 2nd prize, General News category, 2004 World Press Photo Contest, Amsterdam, Netherlands
- 2009: Carmignac Photojournalism Award from Fondation Carmignac, Paris
- 2016: Co-winner with SOS Méditerranée of the Carl von Ossietzky Medal from the International Human Rights League, Berlin

== Exhibitions ==
- The Book of Destruction, Musée d'Art Moderne de Paris, Paris, 2010
