= PeaceJam =

Global youth organization

- PeaceJam
- Formation: 1993
- Founders: Ivan Suvanjieff and Dawn Engle
- Founded at: United States
- Website: www.peacejam.org

PeaceJam is a US-based global youth organization led by Nobel Peace laureates. It was founded by musical artist Ivan Suvanjieff and his wife, the economist Dawn Engle in 1993.

PeaceJam has been nominated for the Nobel Peace Prize eight times.

== History ==
PeaceJam was founded to serve as an educational outreach program on behalf of Nobel peace prize laureates to youths worldwide. In 2014 they launched their One Billion Acts of Peace campaign internationally that would help bring attention to the most pressing issues facing humanity. Over ninety million peace acts inspired by this campaign have been logged into the company’s website.

== Nobel Peace Prize Laureates ==
The organization is led by 14 Nobel peace prize winners:

- 1. Dalai Lama
- 2. Betty Williams
- 3. Rigoberta Menchu Tum
- 4. Oscar Arias
- 5. Desmond Tutu
- 6. Adolfo Perez Esquivel
- 7. Mairead Maguire
- 8. Shirin Ebadi
- 9. Jose Ramos-Horta
- 10. Jody Williams
- 11. Sir Joseph Rotblat
- 12. Leymah Gbowee
- 13. Kailash Satyarthi
- 14. Tawakkol Karman

== Nobel Legacy Film Series ==
The organization also started the production of documentaries that depict the life of the Nobel Peace laureates: Among them include:

- Shirin Ebadi: Until We Are Free
- The Dalai Lama – Scientist
- Betty Williams: Contagious Courage
- Oscar Arias: Without a Shot Fired
- Rigoberta Menchu: Daughter of the Maya
- Adolfo Perez Esquivel: Rivers of Hope
- Desmond Tutu: Children of Light

== See also ==
- Dawn Gifford Engle
