= Otfried Nassauer =

German journalist and peace researcher (1956–2020)

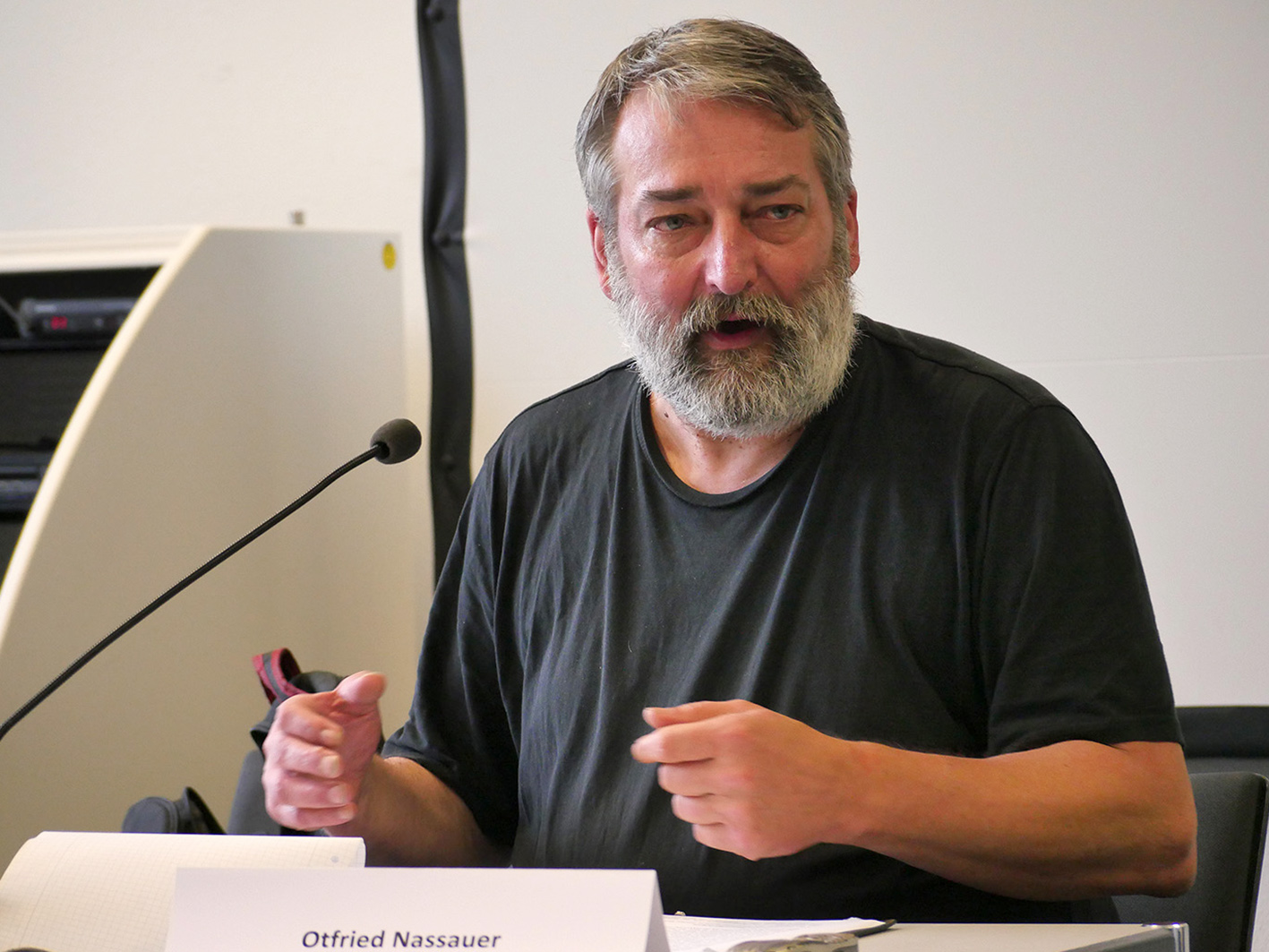
Nassauer in 2018 at the Protestant Academy Baden in Bad Herrenalb

Otfried Nassauer (August 20, 1956 – October 1, 2020) was a German journalist and peace researcher, who interacted between civil society, mass media and politics. Over the course of four decades he had a profound impact on the public discourse in Germany and beyond about German and international military policy, especially in the fields of arms control and arms exports.

== Life ==
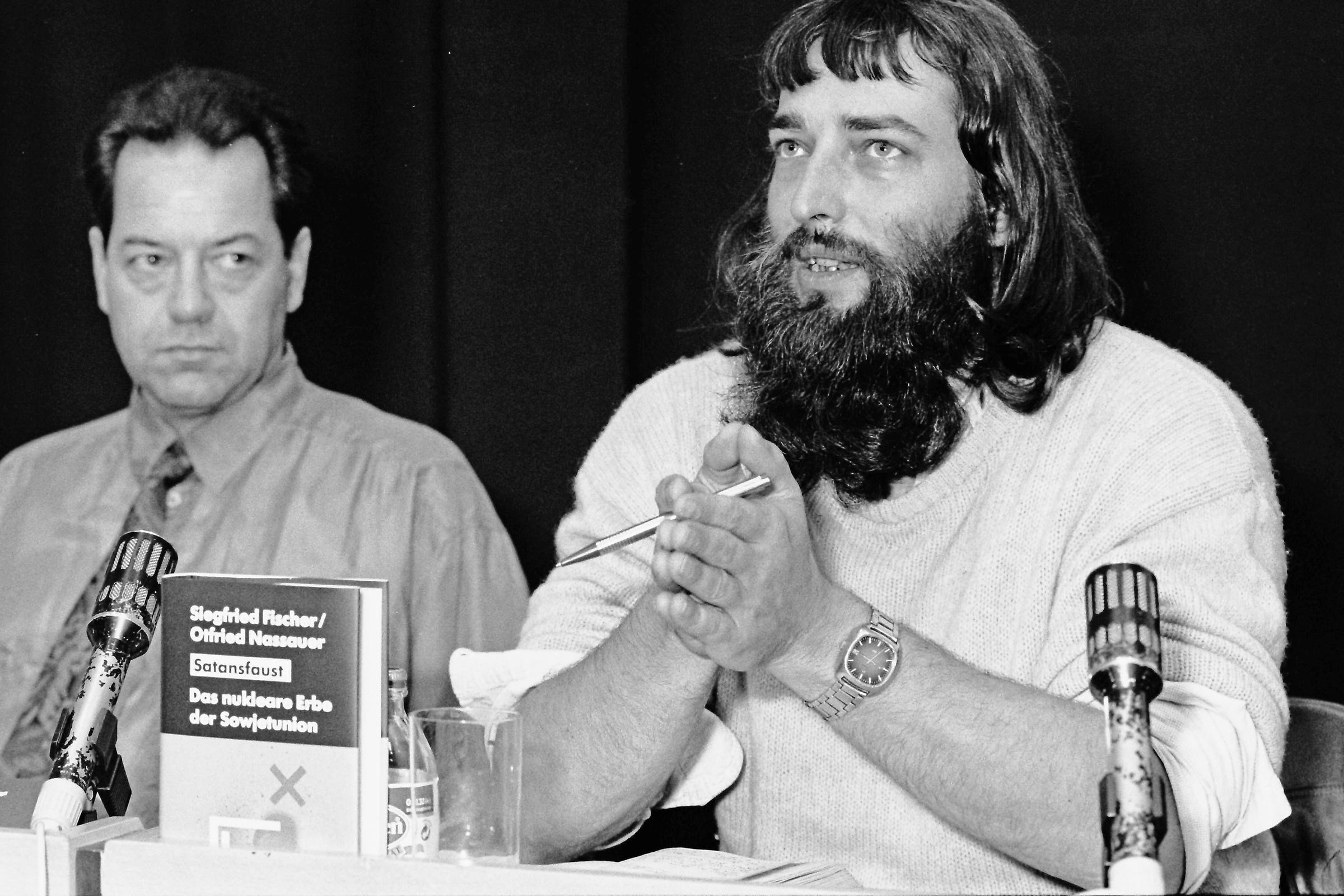
Nassauer (right) with Fischer in 1992 at the book presentation of "Satansfaust"

Nassauer was born in Siegen. He studied Protestant theology at the University of Hamburg. Shortly after the founding of the political party The Greens in 1980 he joined its section "Peace and International Affairs" and its federal working group "Peace" as an independent expert. Three years later he became also an adviser on security policy in the newly formed coordination committee of the German peace movement. When Angelika Beer – a leading politician of the Green party at the time – was elected to be a member of the Bundestag, Germany's Federal Parliament, Nassauer served as a close adviser to her, especially with regard to her membership in the defense committee.

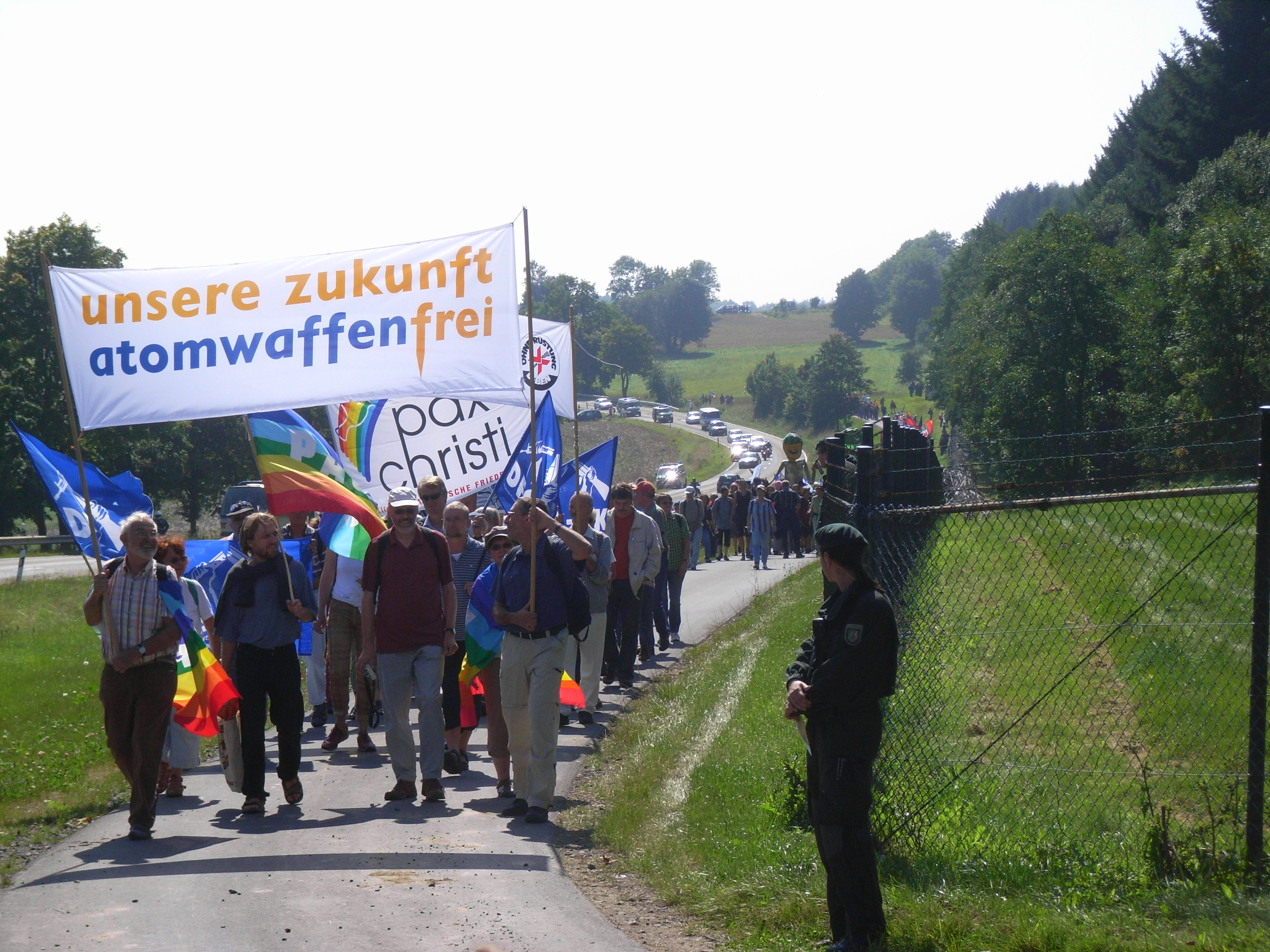
Protests at Büchel Air Base in 2008

Following the fall of the Berlin Wall in 1989, Nassauer organised a meeting between officers of the National People's Army from the Friedrich Engels Military Academy in Dresden and their West German counterparts from the Bundeswehr Command and Staff College in Hamburg. Along with East German military members and peace activists he then attended events both at the NATO headquarters in Brussels and at the General staff of the Armed Forces in Moscow.

In 1991, Nassauer and other peace researchers both from the Federal Republic of Germany (FRG) and the defunct German Democratic Republic (GDR) co-founded the Berlin Information-center for Transatlantic Security (BITS) in the former East-Berlin. In the following year he and his co-director Siegfried Fischer, a former field officer of the People's Navy and military lecturer, edited the anthology Satansfaust, Das nukleare Erbe der Sowjetunion mit Beiträgen (The Fist of Satan: the Nuclear Legacy of the Soviet Union") with contribution by experts from both the Western world and the former Eastern Bloc.

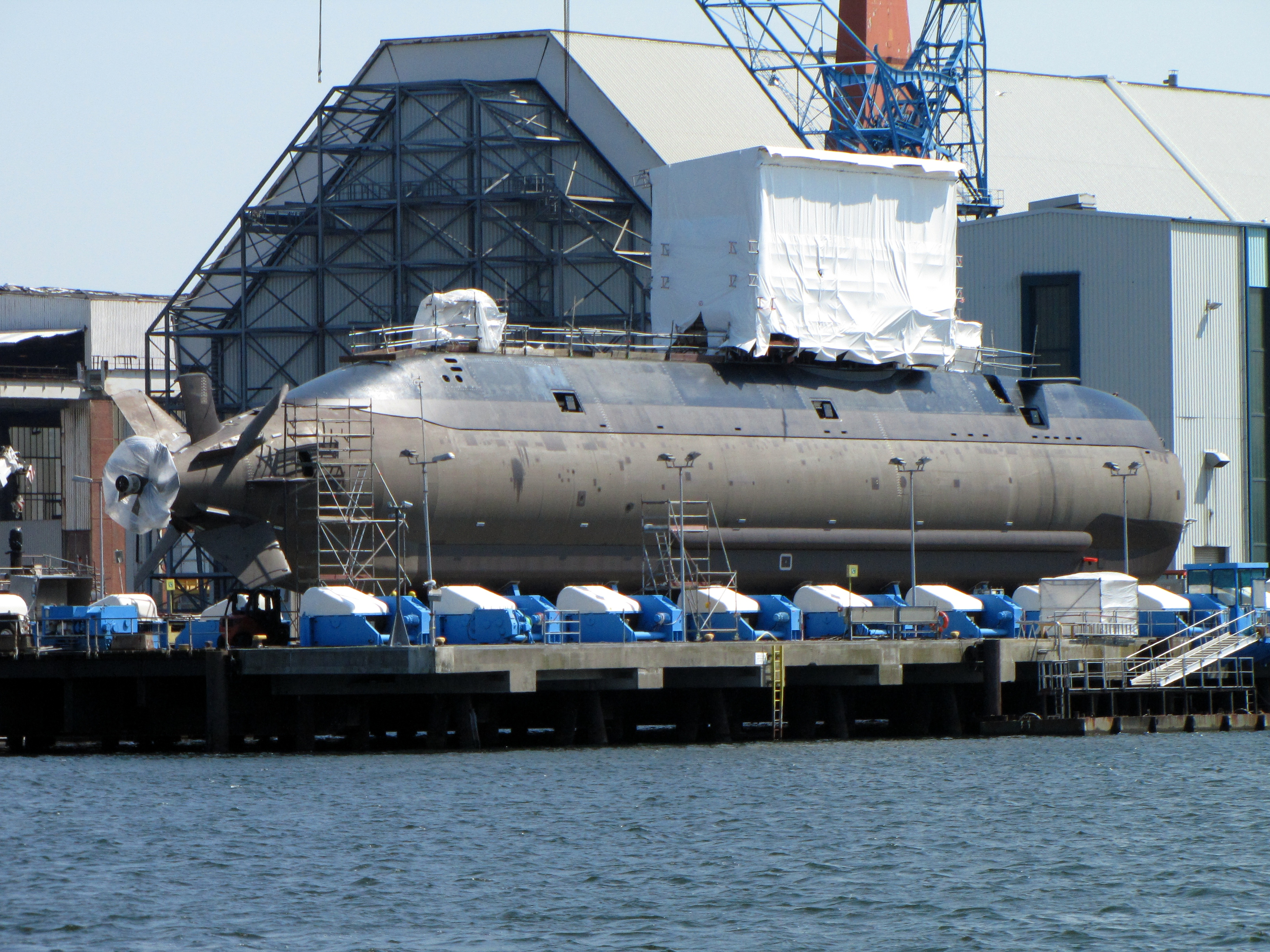
A Dolphin II class submarine commissioned for the Israeli Navy at the HDW shipyard in Kiel (2012)

As director of BITS for almost three decades Nassauer went on to analyse the whole spectrum of developments in the field of security policy. One major focus he kept were the arms control regimes for nuclear weapons, particularly Germany's nuclear sharing through hosting U.S. nuclear weapons at Büchel Air Base. Another main area of his expertise was the complex of German arms exports. It was especially his research on the transfer of German-built Dolphin-class submarines – and his conclusion that they could deploy nuclear missiles – to Israel which confirmed his expert status on the international level. However, he concentrated not only on heavy weapons, but also on small arms, first and foremost in cooperation with pacifist activist Jürgen Grässlin on German gun-maker Heckler & Koch. After the founding of the German section of the International Campaign to Ban Landmines in 1995 Nassauer supported it by co-authoring a study book about land mines made in Germany.

As the Alliance 90/The Greens opened up to military interventions abroad over the course of the 1990s, Nassauer increasingly provided consultancy to the Party of Democratic Socialism (PDS) and its successor, The Left.

Nassauer published his journalistic works regularly in a multitude of mass media outlets, amongst them the left-wing daily newspapers Die Tageszeitung (taz), Neues Deutschland (ND) and Junge Welt, the weekly news magazine Der Spiegel, and the bi-weekly Das Blättchen. In radio broadcasting he particularly shaped the weekly programme Streitkräfte und Strategien ("Armed forces and strategies") of the public service broadcaster Norddeutscher Rundfunk (NDR) with more than 150 contributions since 1993. In the field of television he was particularly active with background research for the investigative programmes of the public broadcaster ARD, e.g. Monitor and Report Mainz.

== Legacy ==
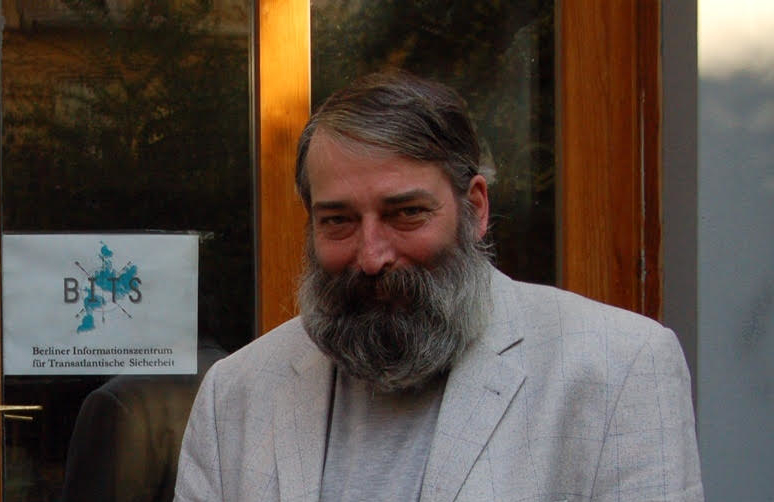
2010 at BITS during a meeting with MP Kathrin Vogler (The LEFT)

On September 30, 2020, the Berlin-based International League for Human Rights informed Nassauer about its decision to award him the Carl von Ossietzky Medal. On the very next day he died at his Berlin apartment aged 64.

The fact that both his expertise and personality were widely appreciated was demonstrated by a multitude of obituaries not only from church and secular peace activist groups, but also from leading journalists and newspapers of record, academia, politicians of different parties and colours as well as from military circles.

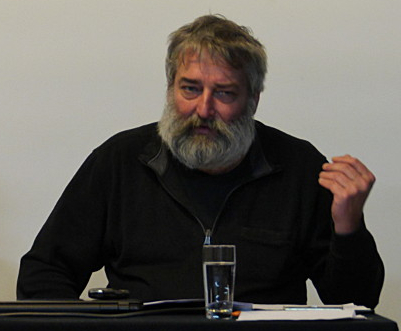
2018 in Düsseldorf at an Ethicon event on Rheinmetall's arms business

He was mourned on the international stage, too. For instance, Hans Kristensen, director of the Nuclear Information Project at the Federation of American Scientists commented:

"I'm saddened to learn of the passing of Otfried Nassauer, a friend and long-term collaborator on European nuclear weapons issues. He was a tireless researcher & advocate".

The South African writer, campaigner and ex-ANC MP Andrew Feinstein remarked:

"The leading authority on German arms makers & exports. An extraordinary character, meticulous researcher & committed campaigner. A huge loss to the German & global peace movement. Rest in peace, kamerad"

On October 17, 2020, a one-page death notice was published in the weekend edition of the daily taz, which was signed by 228 individuals as well as by 83 organisations and groups.

== See also ==
- List of peace activists
