= Nobel Women's Initiative =

Canada-based international advocacy organisation

The Nobel Women's Initiative is an international advocacy organisation based in Ottawa, Canada. It was created in 2006 by six female winners of the Nobel Peace Prize to support women's groups around the world in campaigning for justice, peace and equality. The six founders are Shirin Ebadi, Wangari Maathai, Rigoberta Menchú, Jody Williams, Mairead Maguire, and Betty Williams. The only other living female Nobel Peace Prize winner, Aung San Suu Kyi, was under house arrest at the time of the initiative's formation. She became an honorary member on her release in 2010. The initiative's first conference, in 2007, focused on women, conflict and security in the Middle East.

The initiative defines "peace" as "the commitment to quality and justice; a democratic world free of physical, economic, cultural, political, religious, sexual and environmental violence and the constant threat of these forms of violence against women—indeed against all of humanity."

== See also ==
- List of anti-war organizations
- List of peace activists
- List of women pacifists and peace activists
- List of women's rights organizations
