= Adolfo Perez Esquivel: Rivers of Hope =

- Directed by: Dawn Gifford Engle
- Written by: Dawn Gifford Engle
- Produced by: Jacque Gellein; Rip Gellein; Elizabeth Parmly Weber; Ivan Suvanjieff (executive producer)
- Starring: Adolfo Perez Esquivel
- Cinematography: Elizabeth Holloway; Dave Wruck
- Edited by: Elizabeth Holloway
- Music by: Amanda Guerreño
- Production company: PeaceJam Foundation
- Distributed by: R-Squared Films (2015, Worldwide, video)
- Release date: June 14, 2015
- Running time: 78 minutes
- Country: United States
- Languages: English; Spanish

Adolfo Perez Esquivel: Rivers of Hope is a 2015 American documentary film produced by The PeaceJam Foundation about the life of Nobel Peace Prize Laureate Adolfo Perez Esquivel. The film focuses on the historical analysis of the 80-year period of Argentinian turmoil dating from Esquivel's birth in 1931 to 2014.

== Content ==
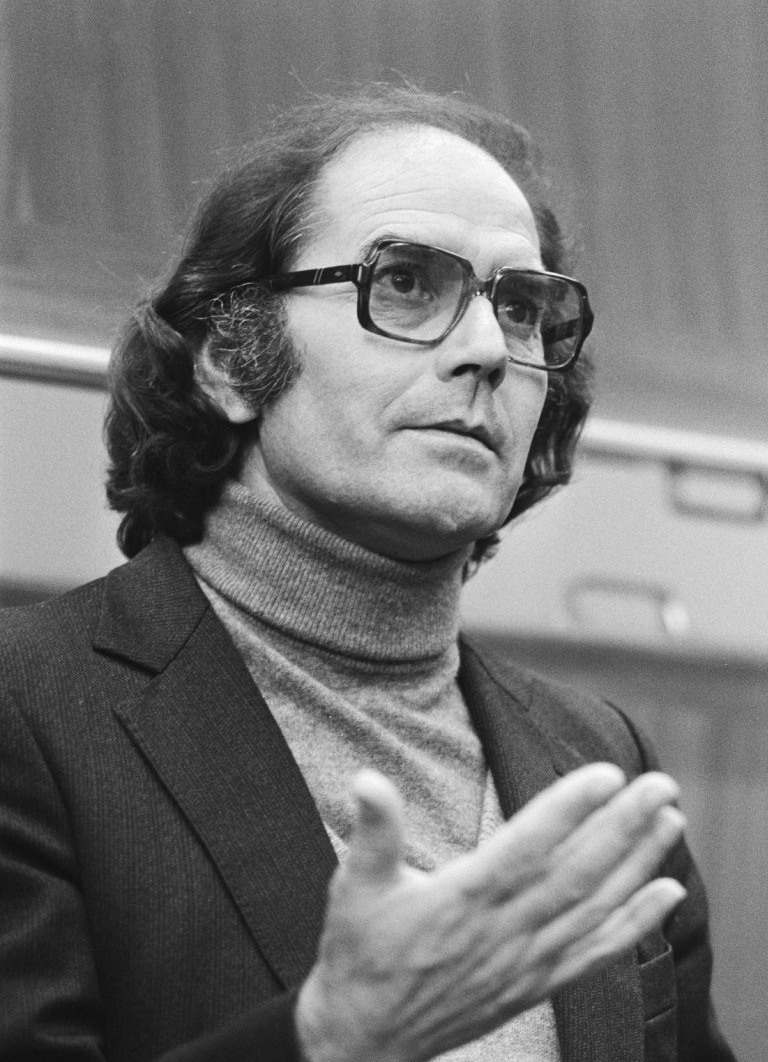
Nobel Peace Laureate Adolfo Perez Esquivel, the subject of the film.

Nobel Peace Laureate Adolfo Perez Esquivel grew up during one of the most unstable time periods in Argentinian history. He lived his early life as an artist and an activist. In 1974 he devoted his time to building nonviolent movements for change in Latin America, a left-wing peace organization. That same year, he was named secretary-general of the newly formed Servicio Paz y Justicia (Peace and Justice Service or SERPAJ) a group that coordinates nonviolent movements in the region. Esquivel regularly traveled the world both for his art and for his peace work.

In 1977 while attempting to renew his passport, Esquivel was arrested and held captive without trial for 14 months during the Argentine Dirty War. The Argentinian Dirty War was a name used by the Argentine Military Government for a period of state sponsored terrorism that took place from 1974 to 1983, in which the right-wing government hunted down and killed left-wing dissidents. During this time period, an estimated 30,000 people disappeared.

Throughout the film the audience is shown archival footage and first hand accounts by Esquivel about the Dirty War Prison system. In one scene a reporter interviews one of the Mothers of the Plaza de Mayo during the Argentine 1978 FIFA World Cup. The Mothers of the Plaza de Mayo are a group of mothers who walk around the outside of the Argentine capital in the thousands, asking to know where all their sons and daughters have gone. As one of the disappeared, Esquivel was imprisoned without trial. He was tortured regularly, and feared for his life every day.

In 1978, Esquivel was named Amnesty International's Political Prisoner of the Year resulting in thousands of letters from the international community demanding his release. Due to the global outcry, the Argentinian government was forced to release him in 1978. After his release he continued to work for SERPAJ.

== Appearances ==
- Adolfo Pérez Esquivel ... Self
- Beverly Keene ... English Voiceover
- Giacomo Buonafina ... News Reporter
- Gaby Cornejo ... News Reporter
- Andrew Hollingworth ... News Reporter
- Alfredo Rodriquez ... News Reporter
- Matias Contreras Selman ... News Reporter
- Lucia Verni ... Spanish Voiceover
