= Mairead Maguire =

Northern Irish peace activist (born 1944)

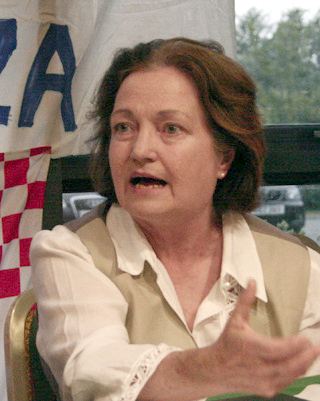
- Maguire at the Free Gaza Movement in July 2009
- Born: Mairead Corrigan; 27 January 1944 (age 82); Belfast, Northern Ireland
- Other name: Mairead Corrigan Maguire
- Education: Trinity College Dublin
- Organization(s): The Peace People, The Nobel Women's Initiative
- Known for: International social activist
- Spouse: Jackie Maguire (m. 1981)
- Children: 2 (5)
- Relatives: Anne Maguire (sister)
- Awards: Nobel Peace Prize (1976); Norwegian People's Peace Prize (1976); Carl von Ossietzky Medal (1976); Pacem in Terris Award (1990)

Mairead Maguire (born 27 January 1944), also known as Mairead Corrigan Maguire and formerly as Mairéad Corrigan, is a peace activist from Northern Ireland. She co-founded, with Betty Williams and Ciaran McKeown, the Women for Peace, which later became the Community for Peace People, an organization dedicated to encouraging a peaceful resolution of the Troubles in Northern Ireland. Maguire and Williams were awarded the 1976 Nobel Peace Prize.

== Early life ==
Maguire was born into a Roman Catholic community in Belfast, Northern Ireland, the second of eight children – five sisters and two brothers. Her parents were Andrew and Margaret Corrigan. She attended St. Vincent's Primary School, a private Catholic school, until the age of 14, at which time her family could no longer pay for her schooling. After working for a time as a babysitter at a Catholic community centre, she was able to save enough money to enroll in a year of business classes at Miss Gordon's Commercial College, which led her at the age of 16 to a job as an accounting clerk with a local factory. She volunteered regularly with the Legion of Mary, spending her evenings and weekends working with children and visiting inmates at Long Kesh prison. When she was 21 she began working as a secretary for the Guinness brewery, where she remained employed until December 1976.

Maguire told The Progressive in 2013 that her early Catholic heroes included Dorothy Day and the Berrigan brothers.

== Northern Ireland peace movement ==
Maguire became active with the Northern Ireland peace movement after three children of her sister, Anne Maguire, were run over and killed by a car driven by Danny Lennon, a Provisional Irish Republican Army (IRA) member who had been fatally shot by soldiers of the King's Own Royal Border Regiment (KORBR) while trying to escape the troops. Lennon had been released from prison in April 1976 after serving three years for suspected involvement in the IRA. On 10 August, Lennon and accomplice John Chillingworth were transporting an Armalite rifle through Andersonstown, Belfast, when a foot patrol of the KORBR, claiming to have seen a passenger in Lennon's car point a rifle at them fired four shots at the vehicle, instantly killing Lennon and critically wounding Chillingworth. The car Lennon drove went out of control and mounted a pavement on Finaghy Road North, colliding with Anne Maguire and three of her children who were out shopping. Joanne (8) and Andrew (6 weeks) died at the scene; John Maguire (2) succumbed to his injuries at a hospital the following day.

Betty Williams, a resident of Andersonstown who happened to be driving by, witnessed the tragedy and accused the IRA of firing at the British patrol and provoking the incident. In the days that followed she began gathering signatures for a peace petition from Protestants and Catholics and was able to assemble some 200 women to march for peace in Belfast. The march passed near the home of Maguire (then Mairead Corrigan) who joined it. She and Williams thus became "the joint leaders of a virtually spontaneous mass movement."

The next march, to the burial sites of the three Maguire children, brought 10,000 Protestant and Catholic women together. The marchers, including Maguire and Williams, were physically attacked by IRA members. By the end of the month Maguire and Williams had brought 35,000 people onto the streets of Belfast petitioning for peace between the republican and loyalist factions. Initially adopting the name "Women for Peace," the movement changed its name to the gender-neutral "Community of Peace People," or simply "Peace People," when Irish Press correspondent Ciaran McKeown joined. In contrast with the prevailing climate at the time, Maguire was convinced that the most effective way to end the violence was not through violence but through re-education. The organization published a biweekly paper, Peace by Peace, and provided for families of prisoners a bus service to and from Belfast's jails. In 1977, she and Betty Williams received the 1976 Nobel Peace Prize for their efforts. Aged 32 at the time, she was the youngest Nobel Peace Prize laureate until Malala Yousafzai was awarded the Nobel Peace Prize in 2014.

The decision to award them the prize drew some criticism. Journalist Michael Binyon of The Times commented, "The Nobel committee has made controversial awards before. Some have appeared to reward hope rather than achievement." He described as sadly "negligible" the two women's contribution to bringing peace to Northern Ireland.

Alex Maskey of Sinn Féin charged that at the time of the Troubles, the Peace People movement was hijacked by the British government and used to turn public opinion against Irish republicanism. "For me and others, the Peace People and their good intentions were quickly exploited and absorbed into British state policy," Maskey opined.

Derek Brown, the Belfast correspondent for The Guardian, wrote that Maguire and Betty Williams were "both formidably articulate and, in the best possible sense, utterly naive." He described their call for an end to violence in response to the will of the people as an "awesomely impractical demand."

In his extensive study of the Peace People movement, Rob Fairmichael found that the Peace People were seen by some as being "more anti-IRA than anti-UDA," i.e. more opposed to republican factions than to loyalist ones. Fairmichael also noted that "Betty Williams and Mairead Corrigan were beaten up numerous times and at times the leaders were threatened by a hostile crowd." Fairmichael noted, as examples of forms that some of the extreme negative reactions took.

While most Nobel Prize laureates keep their prize money, it is not uncommon for prize winners to donate prize money to scientific, cultural or humanitarian causes. Maguire and Williams' decision to keep their prize funds created controversy in Northern Ireland. The move angered many people, including members of the Peace People, and fuelled unpleasant rumours about the two women. Rob Fairmichael writes of "gossip of fur coats" and concludes that the prize money controversy was perceived by the public, in the context of the Peace People's eventual decline, as specifically problematic.

== Later activism ==
Though Betty Williams resigned from the Peace People in 1980, Maguire has continued her involvement in the organization to this day and has served as the group's honorary president. It has since taken on a more global agenda, addressing an array of social and political issues from around the world.

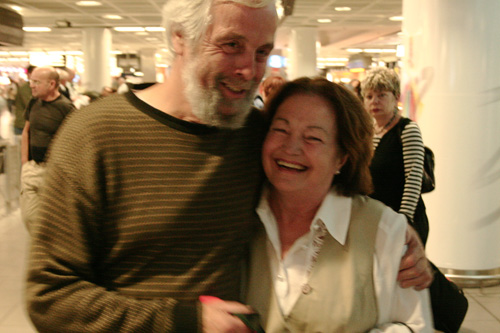
Jackie and Mairead Maguire

In January 1980, after a prolonged battle with depression over the loss of her children in the 1976 Finaghy Road incident, Maguire's sister Anne died by suicide. A year and a half later, in September 1981, Mairead married Jackie Maguire, who was her late sister's widower. She has three stepchildren and two children of her own, John Francis (b. 1982) and Luke (b. 1984).

In 1981 Maguire co-founded the Committee on the Administration of Justice, a nonsectarian organisation dedicated to defending human rights.

She is a member of the anti-abortion group Consistent Life Ethic, which is against abortion, capital punishment and euthanasia.

Maguire has been involved in a number of campaigns on behalf of political prisoners around the world. In 1993 she and six other Nobel Peace Prize laureates tried unsuccessfully to enter Myanmar from Thailand to protest the protracted detention of opposition leader Aung San Suu Kyi. She was a first signatory on a 2008 petition calling on Turkey to end its torture of Kurdish leader Abdullah Öcalan. In October 2010, she signed a petition calling on China to release Nobel Peace Prize laureate Liu Xiaobo from house arrest.

Maguire was selected in 2003 to serve on the honorary board of the International Coalition for the Decade, a coalition of national and international groups, presided over by Christian Renoux, whose aim was to promote the United Nations' 1998 vision of the first decade of the twenty-first century as the International Decade for the Promotion of a Culture of Peace and Non-Violence for the Children of the World.

In 2006, Maguire was one of the founders of the Nobel Women's Initiative along with fellow Peace Prize laureates Betty Williams, Shirin Ebadi, Wangari Maathai, Jody Williams, and Rigoberta Menchú Tum. The Initiative describes itself as six women representing North and South America, Europe, the Middle East, and Africa who decided to bring together their "extraordinary experiences in a united effort for peace with justice and equality" and "to help strengthen work being done in support of women's rights around the world".

Maguire supported the Occupy movement and has described WikiLeaks founder Julian Assange as "very courageous". She has also praised Chelsea Manning. "I think they've been tremendously courageous in telling the truth", she has said, adding that "the American government and NATO have destroyed Iraq and Afghanistan. Their next targets will be Syria and Iran".

Together with Desmond Tutu and Adolfo Pérez Esquivel, Maguire published a letter in support of Chelsea Manning, saying: "The words attributed to Manning reveal that he went through a profound moral struggle between the time he enlisted and when he became a whistleblower. Through his experience in Iraq, he became disturbed by top-level policy that undervalued human life and caused the suffering of innocent civilians and soldiers. Like other courageous whistleblowers, he was driven foremost by a desire to reveal the truth".

Maguire has also earned a degree from the Irish School of Ecumenics at Trinity College Dublin. She works with various interchurch and interfaith organizations and is a councilor with the International Peace Council. She is also a Patron of the Methodist Theological College, and of the Northern Ireland Council for Integrated Education.

In April 2019 Maguire collected the 2019 GUE/NGL Award for Journalists, Whistleblowers & Defenders of the Right to Information on behalf of Julian Assange who was at the time imprisoned by the United Kingdom.

=== United States ===
Maguire is an outspoken critic of U.S. and British policy in the Middle East, particularly in Iraq and Afghanistan. She was also personally critical of U.S. President Barack Obama's leadership. Her activism in the U.S. has occasionally brought her into confrontations with the law.

After initially accepting an invitation to a 2012 Nobel summit in Chicago, she changed her mind because the event was hosted by the U.S. State Department, "and to me the Nobel Peace laureates should not be hosted by a State Department that is continuing with war, removing basic civil liberties and human rights and international law and then talking about peace to young people. That's a double standard".

Maguire said in a 2013 interview that ever since her 40-day fast and arrest outside the White House in 2003 (see below), "whenever I now come into America, I'm always questioned as to what my background is".

In 2015, Maguire spoke with Democracy Now in a sit-down interview titled, "No to Violence, Yes to Dialogue", which included two other Nobel Peace Prize Laureates, Jody Williams and Leymah Gbowee. Maguire discussed the desire "to end militarism and war, and to build peace and international law and human rights and democracy".

==== Iraq and Afghanistan ====
Maguire voiced strong opposition to the U.N. sanctions against Iraq, which is alleged by some to have resulted in hundreds of thousands of civilian deaths, calling them "unjust and inhuman", "a new kind of bomb", and "even more cruel than weapons". During a visit to Baghdad with Argentinian colleague Adolfo Pérez Esquivel in March 1999, Maguire urged then-U.S. President Bill Clinton and British Prime Minister Tony Blair to end the bombing of Iraq and to permit the lifting of U.N. sanction. "I have seen children dying with their mothers next to them and not being able to do anything", Maguire said. "They are not soldiers".

In the aftermath of al-Qaeda's attacks on the U.S. in September 2001, as it became clear that the U.S. would retaliate and deploy troops in Afghanistan, Maguire campaigned against the impending war. In India she claimed to have marched with "hundreds of thousands of Indian people walking for peace". In New York, Maguire was reported to have marched with 10,000 protesters, purportedly including families of 9/11 victims, as U.S. war planes were already en route to strike Taliban targets in Afghanistan.

In the period leading up to the March 2003 invasion of Iraq, Maguire campaigned vigorously against the anticipated hostilities. Speaking at the 23rd War Resisters' International Conference in Dublin, Ireland in August 2002, Maguire called on the Irish government to oppose the Iraq War "in every European and world forum of which they are a part". On 17 March 2003, St. Patrick's Day, Maguire protested the war outside the United Nations Headquarters with, among other activists, Frida Berrigan. On 19 March, Maguire addressed an audience of 300 people in a chapel at Le Moyne College in Syracuse, N.Y. "Armies with all their advanced weapons of mass destruction are facing the Iraqi people who have nothing", she told the crowd. "In anybody's language, it's not fair". Around this time, Maguire held a 30-day vigil and began a 40-day liquid fast outside the White House, joined by members of Pax Christi USA and Christian church leaders. As the war got under way in the days that followed, Maguire described the invasion as an "ongoing and shameful slaughter". "Daily we sit, facing Mecca in solidarity with our Muslim brothers and sisters in Iraq, and we ask Allah for forgiveness", she said in a statement to the press on 31 March. Maguire would later remark that the media in the U.S. distorted news from Iraq and that the Iraq War was carried out in pursuit of American "economic and military interests". In February 2006 she expressed her belief that George W. Bush and Tony Blair "should be made accountable for illegally taking the world to war and for war crimes against humanity".

==== Criticism of President Barack Obama ====
Maguire expressed disappointment with the selection of U.S. President Barack Obama as winner of the 2009 Nobel Peace Prize. "They say this is for his extraordinary efforts to strengthen international diplomacy and co-operation between peoples", she said, "and yet he continues the policy of militarism and occupation of Afghanistan, instead of dialogue and negotiations with all the parties to the conflict. [...] Giving this award to the leader of the most militarised country in the world, which has taken the human family against its will to war, will rightly be seen by many people around the world as a reward for his country's aggression and domination".

After declining to meet with the Dalai Lama during his visit to the U.S. in 2008, citing conflicting travel schedules, Obama declined to meet with the exiled Tibetan spiritual leader again in 2009. Maguire condemned what she considered Obama's deliberate refusal to meet with the Dalai Lama, calling it "horrifying".

Speaking at the Carl von Ossietzky Medal Award Ceremony in Berlin in December 2010, Maguire imputed criminal accountability to President Obama for violation of international law. "When President Obama says he wants to see a world without nuclear weapons and says, in respect of Iran and their alleged nuclear weapons ambitions, that 'all option [sic] are on the table,' this is clearly a threat to use nuclear weapons, clearly a criminal threat against Iran, under the world court advisory opinion. The Nuremberg Charter of 8 August 1945 says the threat or use of nuclear weapons is criminal, so officials in all nine nuclear weapons states who maintain and use nuclear deterrence as a threat are committing crimes and breaking international law".

==== Arrests and travel incidents ====
Maguire was twice arrested in the United States. On 17 March 2003, she was arrested outside the United Nations headquarters in New York City during a protest against the Iraq War. Later that month, on 27 March, she was one of 65 anti-war protesters briefly taken into custody by police after penetrating a security barricade near the White House.

In May 2009, following a visit to Guatemala, immigration authorities at the Houston Airport in Texas detained Maguire for a number of hours, during which time she was questioned, fingerprinted and photographed, and consequently missed her connecting flight to Northern Ireland. "They insisted I must tick the box in the Immigration form admitting to criminal activities," she explained. In late July that same year, Maguire was again detained by immigration authorities, this time at the Dulles International Airport in Virginia, on her way from Ireland to New Mexico to meet with colleague Jody Williams. As in May, the delay resulted in Maguire missing her connecting flight.

=== Israel ===
Maguire first visited Israel at age 40 in 1984. She came then as part of an interfaith initiative seeking forgiveness from Jews for years of persecution by Christians in Jesus' name. Her second visit was in June 2000, this time in response to invitations from Rabbis for Human Rights and the Israeli Committee Against House Demolitions. The two groups had taken upon themselves to defend Ahmed Shamasneh in an Israeli military court against charges of illegally constructing his home in the West Bank town of Qatanna, and Maguire traveled to Israel to observe the court proceedings and support the Shamasneh family.

In a 2013 interview, she omitted any mention of her 1984 trip to Israel, saying that "I first went to Israel/Palestine at the invitation of Rabbis for Human Rights and the Israeli Committee against House Demolitions" and "was absolutely horrified" at Palestinians' living conditions. It was after that visit that she "started going on a regular basis" because she was "very hopeful that there is a solution to the Israeli/Palestinian injustice. In Northern Ireland, people said there would never be a solution. But once people begin to have the political will and force their governments to sit down, it can happen". Maguire has at times been fiercely critical of the State of Israel, even calling for its membership in the United Nations to be revoked or suspended. She has accused the Israeli government of "carrying out a policy of ethnic cleansing against Palestinians...in east Jerusalem" and supports boycott and divestment initiatives against Israel. Concomitantly, Maguire has also said that she loves Israel and that "to live in Israel for Jewish people, is to live in fear of suicide bombs and Kassam rockets".

A 2013 profile of Maguire in The Progressive noted that "she hasn't lost her passion yet" and that "it is the Israeli occupation of Palestine that has occupied much of her attention in recent years".

==== Mordechai Vanunu advocacy ====
Maguire has been a vocal supporter of Mordechai Vanunu, a former Israeli nuclear technician who revealed details of Israel's nuclear defence program to the British press in 1986 and subsequently served 18 years in prison for treason. Maguire flew to Israel in April 2004 to greet Vanunu upon his release and has since flown to meet with him in Israel on several occasions.

Maguire has described as "draconian" the terms of Vanunu's parole – including a special order prohibiting contact with foreign journalists and a refusal to allow him to leave Israel – and said he "remains a virtual prisoner". In an open letter addressed to the Israeli people in July 2010, after Vanunu was returned to prison for violating the terms of his parole, Maguire urged Jews in Israel to petition their government for Vanunu's release and freedom. She praised Vanunu as "a man of peace", "a great visionary", "a true Gandhian spirit" and compared his actions to those of Alfred Nobel.

==== References to the Holocaust ====
At a joint press conference with Mordechai Vanunu in Jerusalem in December 2004, Maguire compared Israel's nuclear weapons to the Nazi gas chambers in Auschwitz. "When I think about nuclear weapons, I've been to Auschwitz concentration camp". She added, "Nuclear weapons are only gas chambers perfected ... and for a people who already know what gas chambers are, how can you even think of building perfect gas chambers".

In January 2006, close to Holocaust Memorial Day, Maguire asked that Mordechai Vanunu be remembered together with the Jews that perished in the Holocaust. "As we, with sorrow and sadness, remember the Holocaust Victims, we remember too those individuals of conscience who refused to be silenced in the face of danger and paid with their freedom and lives in defending their Jewish brothers and sisters, and we remember our brother Mordechai Vanunu – the lonely Israeli prisoner in his own country, who refused to be silent".

In a speech delivered in February 2006 to the Nuclear Age Peace Foundation in Santa Barbara, California, Maguire again made a comparison between nuclear weapons and the Nazis. "Last April some of us protested at Dimona Nuclear Plant, in Israel, calling for it to be open to UN Inspection, and bombs to be destroyed. Israeli Jets flew overhead, and a train passed into the Dimona nuclear site. This brought back to me vivid memories of my visit to Auschwitz concentration camp, with its rail tracks, trains, destruction and death".

Maguire firmly denied comparing Israel to Nazi Germany in an interview with Tal Schneider of Lady Globes in November 2010. "I have for years been speaking out against nuclear weapons. I am actively opposed to nuclear weapons in Britain, in the United States, in Israel, in any country, because nuclear weapons are the ultimate destruction of humankind. But I have never said that Israel is like Nazi Germany, and I don't know why I am quoted like that in Israel. I also never compared Gaza to an extermination camp. I visited the death camps in Austria, with Nobel Prize laureate Elie Wiesel, and I think it is terrible that people did not try to stop the genocide of the Jewish people".

==== Palestinian activism ====
Maguire said in a 2007 speech that Israel's separation wall "is a monument to fear and failed politics" and that "for many Palestinians daily living is so hard, it is indeed an act of resistance." She praised the "inspirational work of the International Solidarity Movement" and paid tribute to the memory of "Rachel Corrie, who gave her life protesting the demolition of Palestinian homes by Israeli military", saying that "it is the Rachels of this world who reminds us that we are responsible for each other, and we are interconnected in a mysteriously spiritual and beautiful way".

On 20 April 2007, Maguire participated in a protest against the construction of Israel's separation barrier outside the Palestinian village of Bil'in. The protest was held in a no-access military zone. Israeli forces used tear-gas grenades and rubber-coated bullets in an effort to disperse the protesters, while the protesters hurled rocks at the Israeli troops, injuring two Border Guard policemen. One rubber bullet hit Maguire in the leg, whereupon she was transferred to an Israeli hospital for treatment. She was also reported to have inhaled large quantities of tear gas.

In October 2008, Maguire arrived in Gaza aboard the SS Dignity. Although Israel had insisted that the yacht would not be permitted to approach Gaza, then-Prime Minister Ehud Olmert ultimately capitulated and allowed the ship to sail to its destination without incident. During her stay in Gaza, Maguire met with Hamas leader Ismail Haniyeh. She was photographed accepting an honorary golden plate depicting the Palestinian flag draped over all of Israel and the occupied territories.

In March 2009, Maguire joined a campaign for the immediate and unconditional removal of Hamas from the European Union list of proscribed terrorist organisations.

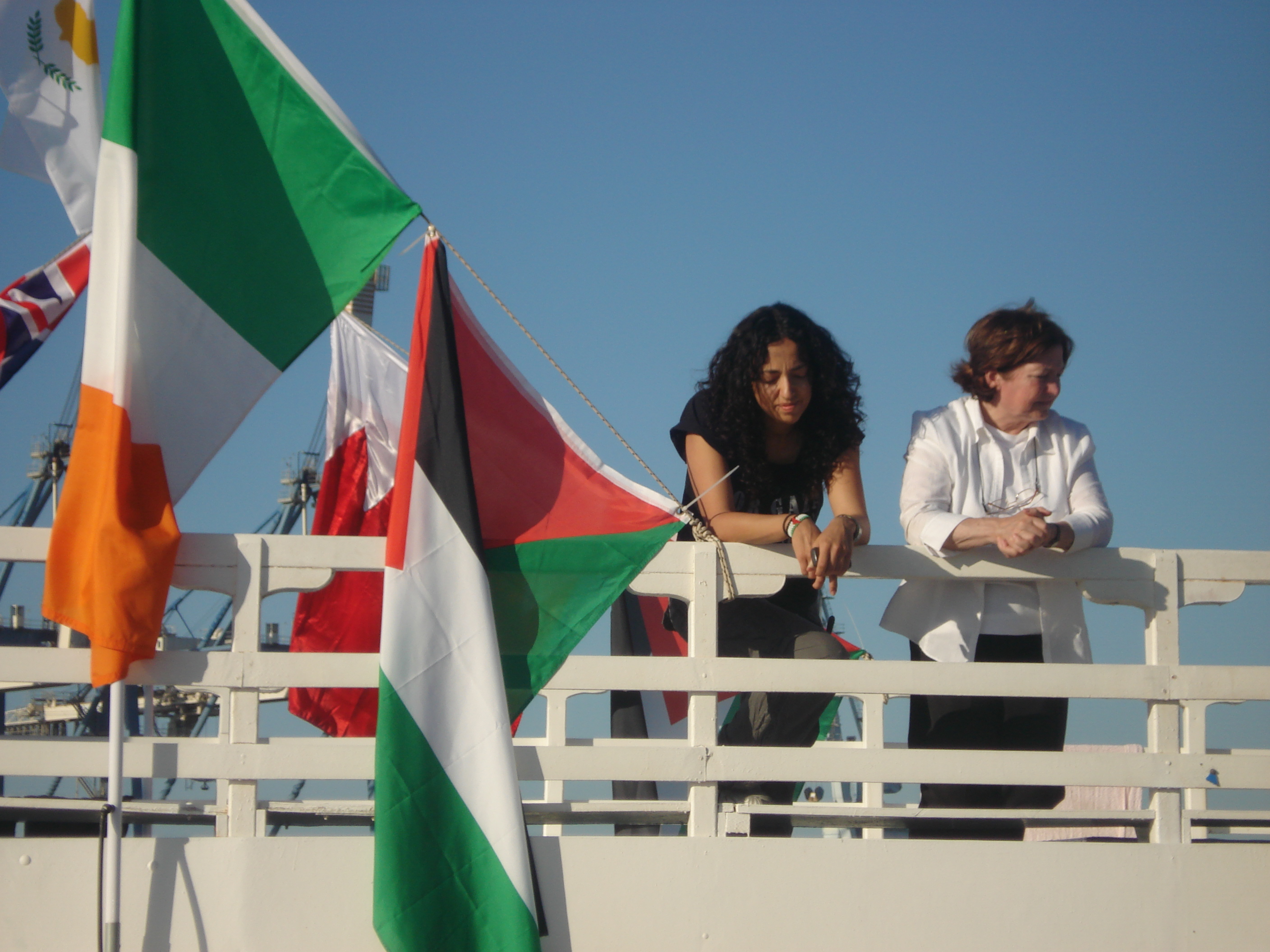
Huwaida Arraf and Maguire, 2009

On 30 June 2009, Maguire was taken into custody by the Israeli military along with twenty others, including former U.S. Congresswoman Cynthia McKinney. She was on board a small ferry, the MV Spirit of Humanity (formerly the Arion), said to be carrying humanitarian aid to the Gaza Strip, when Israel intercepted the vessel off the coast of Gaza. From an Israeli prison, she gave a lengthy interview with Democracy Now! via cell phone, and was deported on 7 July 2009 to Dublin. on 2 July 2009. In the interview, she rejected Israeli authorities' claim that aid can pass freely into Gaza, charging that "Gaza is like a huge prison...a huge occupied territory of one-and-a-half million people who have been subjected to collective punishment by the Israeli government". She further said that "the tragedy is that the American government, the UN and Europe, they remain silent in the face of the abuse of Palestinian human rights, like freedom, and it's really tragic". In addition, she claimed that when her boat was approached by Israeli naval vessels in international waters, "we were in grave danger of actually being killed at that point....really we were in a very, very dangerous position. So we were literally hijacked, taken at gunpoint by the Israeli military".

In May–June 2010, Maguire was a passenger on board the MV Rachel Corrie, one of seven vessels that were part of the Gaza Freedom Flotilla, a flotilla of pro-Palestinian activists that attempted to bust the Israeli-Egyptian blockade of the Gaza Strip. In an interview with BBC Radio Ulster while still at sea, Maguire called the blockade an "inhumane, illegal siege." Having been delayed due to mechanical problems, the Rachel Corrie did not actually sail with the flotilla and only approached the Gazan coast several days after the main flotilla did. In contrast with the violence that characterised the arrival of the first six ships, Israel's takeover of the Rachel Corrie was met only with passive resistance. Israeli naval forces were even lowered a ladder by the passengers to assist their ascent onto the deck. After the incident, Maguire said she did not feel her life was in danger as the ship's captain, Derek Graham, had been in touch with the Israeli navy to assure them that there would be no violent resistance.

On 28 September 2010, Maguire landed in Israel as part of a delegation of the Nobel Women's Initiative. She was refused an entry visa by Israeli authorities on the grounds that she had twice in the past tried to run Israel's naval embargo of the Gaza Strip and that a 10-year exclusion order was in effect against her. She fought her deportation with the help of Adalah, an NGO devoted to the rights of Palestinians in Israel. Fatmeh El-Ajou, an attorney for Adalah noted, "We believe that the decision to refuse entry to Ms. Maguire is based on illegitimate, irrelevant, and arbitrary political considerations". Her legal team filed a petition against the order with the Central District Court on Maguire's behalf, but the court ruled pronounced that the deportation order was valid. Maguire then appealed to Israel's Supreme Court. Initially, the Court proposed that Maguire be allowed to remain in the country for a few days on bail despite the deportation order; however, the state rejected the proposal, arguing that Maguire had known prior to her arrival she was barred from entering Israel and that her conduct amounted to taking the law into her own hands. A three-judge panel accepted the state's position and upheld the ruling of the Central District Court. At one point during the hearing, Maguire reportedly spoke up, saying that Israel must stop "its apartheid policy and the siege on Gaza". One of the judges scolded her saying, "This is no place for propaganda". Corrigan-Maguire was deported on a flight to the UK the following morning, 5 October 2010.

As preparations for a second Gaza flotilla got underway in the summer of 2011, with the Irish MV Saoirse expected to take part, Maguire expressed her support for the campaign and called on Israel to grant the flotilla passengers safe passage to Gaza.

Maguire said in a December 2011 interview that "Hamas is an elected party and should be recognized as such by all. It has the democratic vote and should be recognised". She pointed out that on her 2008 Gaza trip she had been invited to speak "to the Hamas parliament". In March 2014, Maguire tried to arrive to Gaza through Egypt, as a part of activist delegation which also included the American anti-war activist Medea Benjamin. The members of the delegation were arrested in Cairo, questioned and deported.

In 2016, Maguire attempted to break Israel's naval blockade of the Gaza Strip along with 13 other activists on board the Women's Boat to Gaza, until they were stopped by the Israeli Navy approximately 40 miles (64 km) offshore. The boat was escorted to the port of Ashdod. The Israeli military said the interception was brief and without injuries. Maguire complained that she and the activists were "arrested, kidnapped, illegally, in international waters and taken against our wishes to Israel".

==== Comparison of Palestinians and Israelis ====
Maguire has more than once suggested that Palestinians are more interested in peace than the Israeli government. She said in a 2011 interview that when she and some colleagues left Gaza in 2008, "we were very hopeful because there is a passionate desire among the Palestinian people for peace, and then Operation Cast Lead started the following week. That was horrific". Israel, she said, had killed Palestinian farmers and fishermen who were just "trying to fish for their families", thus proving "that the Israeli government does not want peace". In a 2013 interview, she repeated the same point, saying that in Gaza in 2008, she had been told by Hamas and Fatah leaders "that they want dialogue and peace", yet a week later "Israel bombed Gaza, committing war crimes", showing "that there is no political will for peace in the Israeli government".

==== Israeli and pro-Israel reactions ====
In the wake of the 2009 Gaza flotilla, Ben-Dror Yemini, a popular columnist for the Israeli daily Ma'ariv, wrote that Maguire was obsessed with Israel. "There is a lunatic coalition that does not concern itself with the slaughtered in Sri Lanka or with the oppressed Tibetans. They see only the struggle against the Israeli Satan." He further charged that Maguire chose to identify with a population that elected an openly antisemitic movement to lead it – one whose raison d'etre is the destruction of the Jewish state.

Eliaz Luf, the deputy head of the Israeli foreign mission to Canada, has argued that Maguire's activism plays into the hands of Hamas and other terrorist organisations in Gaza.

Michael Elterman, Chairman of the Canada-Israel Committee Pacific Region, warned that Maguire's actions, though probably well-intentioned, have promoted a hateful, antisemitic agenda.

In a 4 October 2010 editorial entitled "The disingenuous Nobel laureate," the Jerusalem Post called Maguire's comparison of Israel's nuclear weapons to the gas chambers of Auschwitz "outrageous" and maintained that "Israel can and must use its sovereignty to stop people like Maguire who are essentially seeking to endanger the lives of Israeli citizens." The Post applauded Maguire's expulsion from Israel, "not because of Maguire's outrageous comparison in 2004 of Israel's purported nuclear capability to Auschwitz's gas chambers, nor because of her absurd, reprehensible accusation made in court Monday that Israel is an "apartheid state" perpetrating "ethnic cleansing against Palestinians," but because she had taken "actions that undermine Israel's ability to protect itself.""

The Post argued that if Maguire and others "truly desire to improve the lives of Gazans, they should send their humanitarian aid in coordination with Israel," pressure Hamas "and the other radical Islamists who control the Gaza Strip to stop senseless ballistic attacks on Israeli towns and villages, kibbutzim and moshavim," and "insist that Hamas provide Gaza's citizens with a stable, responsible leadership that respects human rights and religious freedom, as well as that it accept the UN-recognized right of the Jewish people to self-determination and political sovereignty in their historical homeland." But Maguire "seems more intent on enabling Israel's terrorist enemies," exploiting "charges of a 'humanitarian crisis' in Gaza in order to empower Hamas terrorists." Jewish and Israeli opinion is not all negative. Following the June 2010 Gaza flotilla raid, Israeli Prime Minister Benjamin Netanyahu was careful to distinguish between Maguire's nonviolent resistance aboard the Rachel Corrie, which he referred to as "a flotilla of peace activists – with whom we disagree, but whose right to a different opinion we respect," and the conduct of the activists aboard the other six vessels, which he described as "a flotilla of hate, organized by violent, terrorism-supporting extremists." Gideon Levy strongly defended Maguire in the Israeli newspaper Haaretz in October 2010, calling her "the victim of state terror" after Israel refused to allow her to enter the country and kept her detained for several days.

=== Russell Tribunal ===
In October 2012, Maguire traveled to New York City to serve on the Russell Tribunal on Israel/Palestine alongside writer Alice Walker, activist Angela Davis, former Congresswoman Cynthia McKinney, and Pink Floyd's Roger Waters. During her participation in the Russell Tribunal, Maguire, according to one report, "asked the question that seems to be taboo in the U.S.: Why does President Barack Obama allow Israel to threaten Iran with war when Iran has signed the NPT and Israel has at least 200 nuclear weapons? Why does the president not demand that Israel sign the NPT?"

After her work on the Russell Tribunal was completed Maguire said that the experience had "opened the mind, and deepened the understanding of all those present to the facts of the ongoing injustice which the Palestinians are daily suffering under Israeli siege and occupation. The RToP's findings and conclusions challenge Governments and civil society to have courage and act by implementing sanctions, BDS etc., thereby refusing to be silent and complicit in the face of Israel's violation of International Laws. The RToP was brilliant, informative and decisive, reminding us that all our Governments, and we the people, have a moral and legal responsibility to act to protect Human Rights and International Law and we cannot be silent when injustice is being done to anyone, anywhere".

=== Rohingya refugee crisis ===
In March 2018, Maguire and two Nobel peace laureates Shirin Ebadi and Tawakkol Karman visited Rohingya camps in Cox's Bazar and shared opinions on the crisis. After returning to Dhaka they discussed the Rohingya crisis with members of the civil society of Bangladesh.

=== Russia-Ukraine war ===
After Russia invaded Ukraine in 2022, Maguire stated that she was opposed to all military action against Russia, as well as European Union (EU) membership for Ukraine. She criticized the EU and the United Nations, arguing that they were demonising Russia. She asserted that Russia should not be punished for the invasion.

== Personal philosophy and vision ==
Gandhi taught that nonviolence does not mean passivity. No. It is the most daring, creative, and courageous way of living, and it is the only hope for our world. Nonviolence is an active way of life which always rejects violence and killing, and instead applies the force of love and truth as a means to transform conflict and the root causes of conflict. Nonviolence demands creativity. It pursues dialogue, seeks reconciliation, listens to the truth in our opponents, rejects militarism, and allows God's spirit to transform us socially and politically.

— Mairead Maguire, Santa Clara University

Mairead Maguire is a proponent of the belief that violence is a disease that humans develop but are not born with. She believes humankind is moving away from a mindset of violence and war and evolving to a higher consciousness of nonviolence and love. Among the figures she considers spiritual prophets in this regard are Jesus, Francis of Assisi, Gandhi, Khan Abdul Ghaffar Khan, Fr. John L. McKenzie, and Martin Luther King Jr.

Maguire professes to rejects violence in all its forms. "As a pacifist I believe that violence is never justified, and there are always alternatives to force and threat of force. We must challenge the society that tells us there is no such alternative. In all areas of our lives we should adopt nonviolence, in our lifestyles, our education, our commerce, our defence, and our governance." Maguire has called for the abolition of all armies and the establishment of a multi-national community of unarmed peacekeepers in their stead.

=== The Vision of Peace: Faith and Hope in Northern Ireland ===
Maguire has written a book, The Vision of Peace: Faith and Hope in Northern Ireland. Published in 2010, it is a collection of essays and letters, in many of which she discusses the connections between her political activities and her faith. Most of the book is about Northern Ireland, but Maguire also discusses the Holocaust, India, East Timor, and Yugoslavia. Maguire writes that "hope for the future depends on each of us taking non-violence into our hearts and minds and developing new and imaginative structures which are non-violent and life-giving for all.... Some people will argue that this is too idealistic. I believe it is very realistic.... We can rejoice and celebrate today because we are living in a miraculous time. Everything is changing and everything is possible."

== Awards and honours ==
Maguire has received numerous awards and honours in recognition of her work. Yale University awarded Maguire an honorary Doctor of Laws degree in 1977. In the same year, she received the Golden Plate Award of the American Academy of Achievement. The College of New Rochelle awarded her an honorary degree 1978, as well. In 1998 Maguire received an honorary degree from Regis University, a Jesuit institution in Denver, Colorado. The University of Rhode Island awarded her an honorary degree in 2000. She was presented with the Science and Peace Gold Medal by the Albert Schweitzer International University in 2006, for meaningfully contributing to the spread of culture and the defence of world peace.

In 1990 she was awarded the Pacem in Terris Award, named after a 1963 encyclical letter by Pope John XXIII that called upon all people of good will to secure peace among all nations. The Davenport Catholic Interracial Council extolled Maguire for her peace efforts in Northern Ireland and for being "a global force against violence in the name of religion." Pacem in terris is Latin for "Peace on Earth".

The Nuclear Age Peace Foundation honoured Maguire with the Distinguished Peace Leadership Award in 1992, "for her moral leadership and steadfast commitment to social justice and nonviolence."

== See also ==
- List of female Nobel laureates
- List of peace activists
- International Fellowship of Reconciliation
- PeaceJam

== Bibliography ==
- Abrams, Irwin (2001). The Nobel Peace Prize and the Laureates: An illustrated biographical history 1901–2001. USA: Science History Publications. ISBN 0-88135-388-4.
- Abrams, Irwin; Wang, Gungwu, eds. (2003). The Iraq War and Its Consequences. Singapore: World Scientific. ISBN 981-238-590-8.
- Buscher, Sarah & Ling, Bettina (1999). Máiread Corrigan and Betty Williams: Making Peace in Northern Ireland. New York: The Feminist Press. p. 32. ISBN 1-55861-200-9.
- Fairmichael, Rob (1987). "The Peace People Experience" (PDF). Irish Network for Nonviolent Action, Training and Education.
