= Madjiguène Cissé =

Senegalese activist (1951–2023)

- Born: 26 September 1951
- Died: 15 May 2023
- Occupation: Activist

Madjiguène Cissé (26 September 1951 – 15 May 2023) was a Senegalese activist who was the spokeswoman of the undocumented immigrants movement and founder of the Women's Network for Sustainable Development in Africa.

== Biography ==
Cissé was born in Dakar. Her parents were illiterate when they moved from the countryside to Dakar. Her ambitious and progressive father learned to read and got his driving license. At his request, Cissé started attending school in 1958. In 1968, she took part in demonstrations. After she obtained the Baccalauréat, she started her German studies. In 1974, she was granted a two-year scholarship to study in Saarbrücken, Germany.

Cissé subsequently went back to Dakar and worked as a German teacher in a high school. In 1993, as a mother of three, she stayed in Paris for her daughter's studies. Although she had a legal residence permit, she discovered and joined the undocumented workers movement in March 1996 and became one of its spokespeople.

In 2000, she went back to Dakar where she co-founded the Women's Network for Sustainable Development in Africa (French: Réseau des femmes pour le développement durable en Afrique, REFDAF) and became its director. The network aims at improving women's living standards through education, support actions to develop employment, and granting microcredits.

Cissé died on 15 May 2023, at the age of 71.

== Published works ==
- Parole de sans-papiers, 1999. (in French)
- Papiere für alle. Die Bewegung der Sans Papiers in Frankreich, A Verlag, Hamburg, 2002, ISBN 978-3924737450. (in German)
- Les Sans-Papiers: Les premier teachings (A Woman Draws the First Lesson)

== Awards ==
- 1998: International League for Human Rights's Carl von Ossietzky Medal, alongside Les Collectifs de sans-papiers
- 2011: Markgräfin-Wilhelmine, Bayreuth city prize
