= Children of the Light (film) =

- Film poster
- Directed by: Dawn Engle
- Written by: Dawn Engle
- Cinematography: Ivan Suvanjieff
- Release date: 2014
- Running time: 92 minutes
- Language: English

Children of the Light is a documentary film produced by The PeaceJam Foundation about the life of Archbishop Desmond Tutu. It is the first film to tell the life story of Nobel Prize winner Desmond Tutu, one of the fathers of modern-day South Africa, and features extensive archival footage, family photos and never-before-seen interviews. It premiered at the Monte-Carlo Television Festival on June 8, 2014.

== About ==
Children of the Light combines a sweeping view of South African history with perspective on the life of one of its most influential figures: Desmond Tutu. His story — which has never been covered by a documentary before — began long before an uprising over apartheid policies took place. Born to an uneducated mother, Tutu recalls looking to figures like Americans Jackie Robinson and Cab Calloway as early inspirations in a segregated society where white bullies would chase and attack him every time he went to town.

Troubles began stirring in his country at large when he was 17. With the election of the National Party, a strong division between the white and black peoples of South Africa was created, giving great privileges and rights to whites that were denied to others. In pursuit of his college education, Tutu came to meet Nelson Mandela and his future wife Leah. His first encounter with the country's problems came in his role as a teacher: he refused to participate in discriminatory policies. Soon, he left teaching and was accepted into the priesthood.

Tensions in South Africa continued to escalate, spurred on by the imprisonment of figures like Mandela, the death of Steve Biko, and violent police opposition to the many protests and demonstrations that soon took place regularly. Mass funerals were common gathering points, which Tutu began speaking at in attempts to encourage the people's efforts while keeping their actions non-violent.

Elected as secretary general of the South African Council of Churches, Tutu attempted to bring the problem of apartheid to a larger international audience through economic sanctions; his own government soon attempted to pass a referendum that would exclude blacks from political representation entirely. As the struggle continued, Tutu was awarded the Nobel Peace Prize in 1984.

Many years of protests and advocacy, amid increasing restrictions from the government, took place. While Tutu was also given the position of Archbishop for his efforts in 1986, three more years passed before the tide began to turn: new president F.W. de Klerk freed Nelson Mandela and helped end the political authority of apartheid.

This would not be the end of Tutu's activities: Tutu was made chairman of South Africa's Truth and Reconciliation Commission at the beginning of Mandela's election, giving those who had felt the previous regime's violence a chance to have their stories heard. He also helped reopen Robben Island, a notorious prison colony where Mandela and others had been kept, and accompanied the first group — a cross-section of South African youth — to take a tour and participate in various service learning activities.

This leads into the film's conclusion: a summary of the community-based projects of four other young people from around the world who met Tutu at the 2010 PeaceJam World Conference. As a leader for social change and champion of human rights, Desmond Tutu's life and efforts continue to be a source of inspiration for peacemakers across the world.

== Critical reception ==
The film received a positive review by Shannon M. Houston from Paste magazine who called it a "fitting tribute".
