= Ciaran McKeown =

Northern Irish peace activist (1943–2019)

Ciaran McKeown (1943 – 1 September 2019) was a peace activist in Northern Ireland.

== Early life and education ==
Born in Derry to a Roman Catholic family, the son of a schoolmaster McKeown served as a Dominican novice for eight months in his youth.

He attended Queen's University Belfast, where he studied philosophy, becoming the first Catholic to be elected president of the university's student council. He was also elected chair of the National Democrats, a ginger group linked with the National Democratic Party. He became president of the Union of Students in Ireland in 1969, based in Dublin, and stood in Dublin South-West at the 1969 general election, coming in last place, with only 154 votes.

== Journalist ==
In 1970, McKeown became a reporter for The Irish Times, then later worked for The Irish Press, as their Belfast correspondent. Given his experience of reporting on the emergence of The Troubles, he supported the 1976 creation of "Women for Peace", a Northern Ireland-based movement, by Betty Williams and Mairead Corrigan. When his involvement became more widely known, the movement changed its name to "Community of Peace People," or simply "Peace People". After the events of 1976-77 he found it difficult to return to full-time journalism.

== Peace activist ==
Although McKeown became known as a thoughtful and calm presence in the leadership of the organisation, his criticisms of the reluctance of church authorities to speak out on sectarian issues caused some tensions. Corrigan and Williams won the 1976 Nobel Peace Prize, but McKeown was not made a party to it. However, the Ford Foundation made a grant to the group, which included a salary for McKeown, enabling him to become full-time editor of Peace by Peace, the group's newspaper, also completing a year as editor of Fortnight Magazine, in 1977.

McKeown, Corrigan and Williams all stepped down from the leadership posts in 1978, although McKeown continued to edit Peace by Peace. His articles brought him into conflict with the group's new leadership, while financial disagreements massively reduced the group's membership. Ultimately, his belief that the group should call for special status for paramilitary prisoners led to a split, with Williams and her leading supporter, Peter McLachlan, resigning in February 1980. McKeown could no longer survive on the group's salary, nor could he find work as a journalist, so he retrained as a typesetter.

In 1984, he published his autobiography, The Passion of Peace; this was almost immediately withdrawn following a claim that it libelled a journalist, although it was later reissued with an additional note.

== See also ==
- List of peace activists
