= Adolfo Pérez Esquivel =

Argentine Nobel Peace Prize laureate (born 1931)

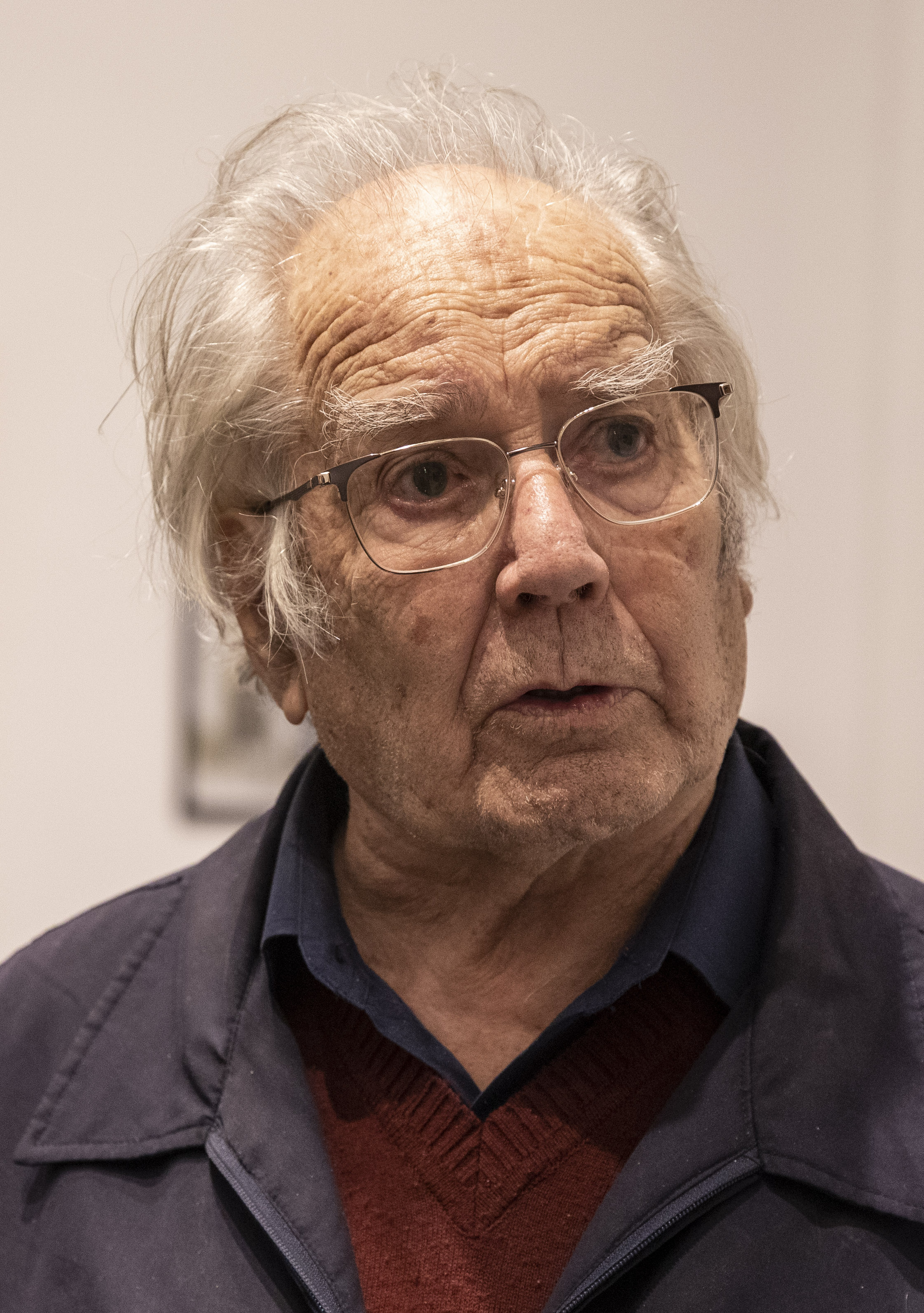
- Pérez Esquivel in 2023
- Born: 26 November 1931 (age 94); Buenos Aires, Argentina
- Education: National University of La Plata
- Awards: Nobel Peace Prize (1980); Pacem in Terris Award (1999)

Adolfo Pérez Esquivel (born 26 November 1931) is an Argentine activist, community organizer, painter, writer and sculptor. He was the recipient of the 1980 Nobel Peace Prize for his opposition to Argentina's last civil-military dictatorship (1976–1983), during which he was detained, tortured, and held without trial for 14 months. He also received, among other distinctions, the Pacem in Terris Award.

== Early life ==
Pérez Esquivel was born in Buenos Aires on 26 November 1931 to a Spanish fisherman from Poio, Galicia, who emigrated to Argentina. His mother died when he was three, and despite his poverty, he attended the Manuel Belgrano School of Fine Arts and the National University of La Plata, where he was trained as a painter and sculptor. He was appointed professor of architecture and worked with a variety of sculptural media, and for 25 years taught in all levels from primary to university. Pérez Esquivel began working with popularly based Latin American Christian pacifist groups during the 1960s. He relinquished his teaching post in 1974, when he was chosen as coordinator general for a network of Latin America-based communities promoting liberation of the poor through non-violence.

== Plight for human rights ==
When systematic repression followed the March 1976 coup, which brought the dictatorship of General Jorge Videla to power, Pérez Esquivel contributed to the formation and financing of the linkages between popularly based organizations to defend human rights in Argentina and support the families of the victims of the Dirty War. The NGO Servicio Paz y Justicia ("Service, Peace and Justice Foundation", or SERPAJ), which he co-founded in 1974, and served as an instrument for the defense of human rights by promoting an international campaign to denounce the atrocities committed by the military regime. SERPAJ is a member of the International Fellowship of Reconciliation (IFOR), which supported Esquivel's work from the beginning. (Note: On 17 November 1980, his wife, Amanda, wrote a letter to Hildegard Goss-Mayr, IFOR travelling secretary: "This [Nobel] prize will have to be woven with all those who have been for years in this difficult task of uniting and reconciling brothers. Although I never told you this, through your letters and personal contacts you have stimulated in one way or another the path that Adolfo has walked. He has always had you as his first teacher, who one distant day arrived in Buenos Aires, connected with the Ark, and explained in the most simple and humble way what nonviolence was... [with] your suggesting... the way to work and organize. You have always accompanied us in the good and bad moments. For that reason too, I believe you are also part of this prize".)

Pérez Esquivel was detained by the Brazilian Military Police in 1975. He was jailed in 1976 in Ecuador, along with Latin American and North American bishops. He was detained in Buenos Aires in 1977 by the Argentine Federal Police, tortured, and held without trial for 14 months; during that, he received, among other distinctions, the Pope John XXIII Peace Memorial.

=== Distinctions ===
Nominated by 1976 Nobel Peace Prize laureates Mairead Corrigan and Betty Williams, Pérez Esquivel was awarded the Nobel Peace Prize on 10 December 1980, for his efforts in the defense of human rights. Accepting the prize "in the name of the poorest and smallest of my brothers and sisters," he donated the prize money to charity. He remained active in support of the Mothers of the Plaza de Mayo despite ongoing harassment by the dictatorship, and later joined causes in support of the indigenous peoples of Argentina and environmentalism and against austerity policies and the Free Trade Area of the Americas.

Pérez Esquivel was awarded the Pacem in Terris Award in 1999.

Pérez Esquivel served as president of the Honorary Council of Service, Latin American Peace and Justice Foundation and of the International League for Human Rights and Liberation of Peoples (based in Milan), and as a member of the Permanent Peoples' Tribunal. He published Caminando Junto al Pueblo ("Walking Together with the People", 1995), in which he relates his experiences with nonviolence in Latin America, and he was appointed Professor of Peace and Human Rights Studies at the University of Buenos Aires in 1998. He campaigned during 2010 against the practice on the part of the Esquel Police Department of training children into paramilitary squads, an operation that he compared to the creation of Nazi Germany's Hitler Youth.

== Recent years ==
Pérez Esquivel is a permanent lecturer at the University of Buenos Aires Faculty of Social Sciences, where he directs the seminar "Culture for Peace and Human Rights".

Pérez Esquivel opposed the European intervention in the 2011 Libyan Civil War and warned against an intervention in the Syrian Civil War. In the aftermath of the death of Osama bin Laden, he sent a letter to President Barack Obama suggesting the United States killed rather than tried bin Laden because he could have revealed unsettling information about 9/11. He argued, "You know that there are people who have investigated the tragic events of 9/11/2001 and claim there is evidence that this was a self-coup (self-inflicted attack)." Later, he added, "this event was the perfect excuse to launch a war against Afghanistan and Iraq and now against Libya," and referred to the United States an "axis of evil."

Pérez Esquivel expressed himself regarding the 2013 election of Archbishop of Buenos Aires Jorge Bergoglio as Pope Francis, stating that as Provincial superior of Jesuits "he had lacked the sufficient courage shown by other Bishops to support our cause for human rights during the dictatorship." Pérez Esquivel also said that "Bergoglio did what he could given his age at that time." He, however, clarified that the future Pope "was no accomplice and had no links with the dictatorship" and that while "it is said he did not do enough to get two priests out of jail, I know personally that many bishops called on the military junta for the release of prisoners and priests and that these requests were not granted."

In June 2017, he defended the government of Nicolás Maduro in Venezuela, saying that the country was undergoing a coup d'état attempt, orchestrated by the United States.

He was hospitalized in January 2022 following a stroke.

== Works of art ==
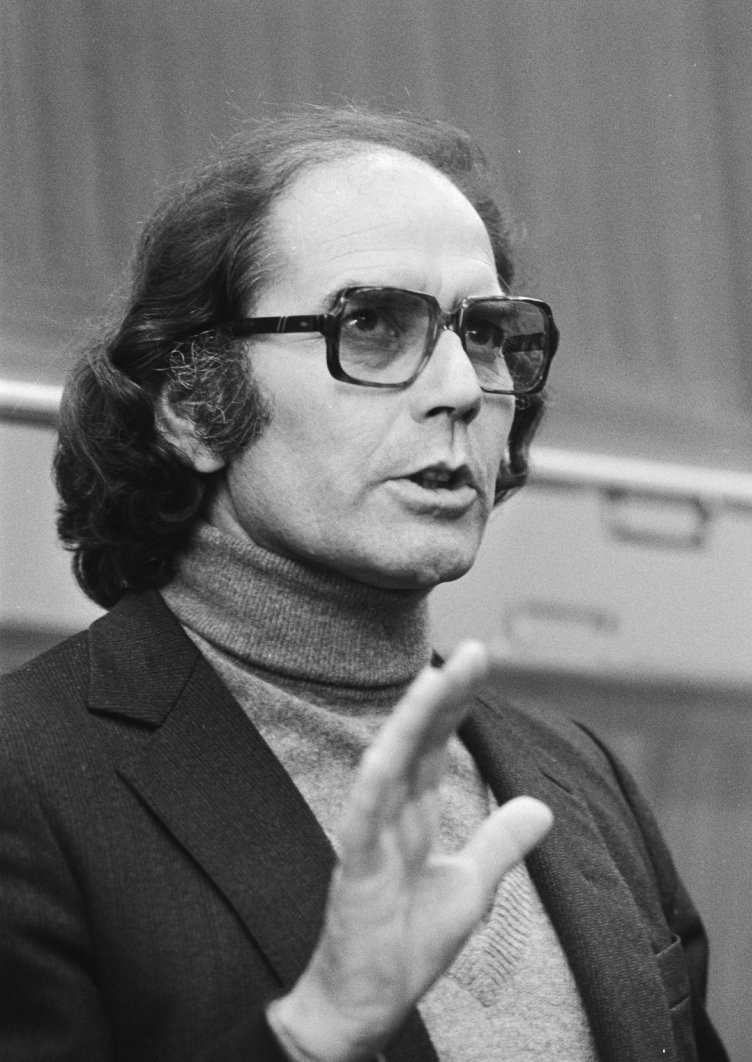
Adolfo Pérez Esquivel in 1983

Esquivel's work ranges from exhibitions to murals and monuments, including the 15 station Latin American Via Crucis (including a Lenten cloth "A new sky and a new land") made in 1992 to commemorate the 500th anniversary of the conquest of America; Monument to Refugees, located in the Headquarters of the UNHCR in Switzerland; the Latin American Peoples Mural in the Cathedral of Riobamba, Ecuador, dedicated to Monsignor Proaño and the indigenous peoples; and a bronze statue in tribute to Mahatma Gandhi at Gandhi Square, in Barcelona.

== See also ==
- World Social Forum
- Adolfo Perez Esquivel: Rivers of Hope
