= Betty Williams =

Northern Irish peace activist and Nobel laureate

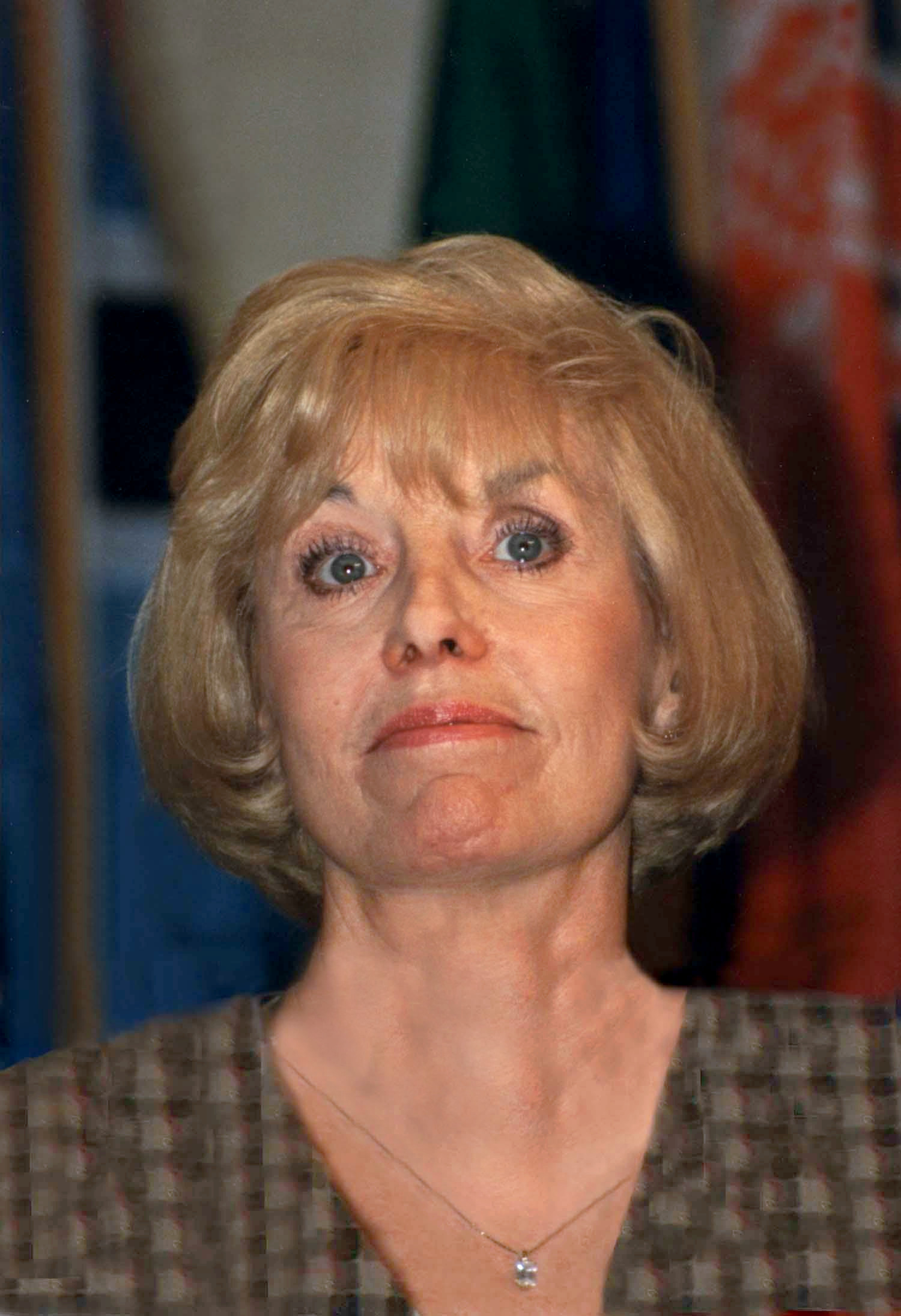
- Williams in 1996
- Born: Elizabeth Smyth; 22 May 1943; Belfast, Northern Ireland
- Died: 17 March 2020 (aged 76); Belfast, Northern Ireland
- Education: St Dominic's Grammar School for Girls, Belfast
- Occupations: Activist, humanitarian
- Known for: Receiving the 1976 Nobel Peace Prize; Co-founder of the Nobel Women's Initiative
- Spouses: Ralph Williams (marriage dissolved); James Perkins (m. 1982)
- Children: 2
- Awards: Nobel Peace Prize (1976)

Elizabeth Williams (née Smyth; 22 May 1943 – 17 March 2020) was a peace activist from Northern Ireland. She was a co-recipient with Mairead Corrigan of the Nobel Peace Prize in 1976 for her work as a cofounder of Community of Peace People, an organisation dedicated to promoting a peaceful resolution to the Troubles in Northern Ireland.

Williams headed the Global Children's Foundation and was the President of the World Centre of Compassion for Children International. She was also the Chair of Institute for Asian Democracy in Washington D.C. She lectured widely on topics of peace, education, inter-cultural and inter-faith understanding, anti-extremism, and children's rights.

Williams was a founding member of the Nobel Laureate Summit, which has taken place annually since 2000.

In 2006, Williams became a founder of the Nobel Women's Initiative along with Nobel Peace Laureates Mairead Corrigan Maguire, Shirin Ebadi, Wangari Maathai, Jody Williams and Rigoberta Menchú Tum. These six women, representing North and South America, the Middle East, Europe and Africa, brought together their experiences in a united effort for peace with justice and equality. It is the goal of the Nobel Women's Initiative to help strengthen work being done in support of women's rights around the world. Williams was also a member of PeaceJam.

== Early life ==
Williams was born on 22 May 1943 in Belfast, Northern Ireland. Her father worked as a butcher and her mother was a housewife. Betty received her primary education from St. Teresa Primary School in Belfast and attended St Dominic's Grammar School for Girls for her secondary school studies. Upon completing her formal education, she took up a job of office receptionist.

Rare for the time in Northern Ireland, her father was Protestant and her mother was Catholic; a family background from which Williams later said she derived religious tolerance and a breadth of vision that motivated her to work for peace. Early in the 1970s she joined an anti-violence campaign headed by a Protestant priest. Williams credited this experience for preparing her to eventually found her own peace movement, which focused on creating peace groups composed of former opponents, practicing confidence-building measures, and the development of a grassroots peace process.

== Peace petition ==
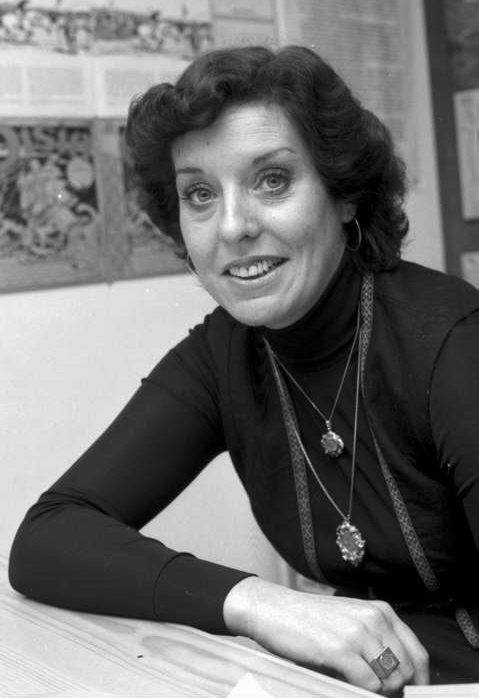
Williams in 1978

Williams was drawn into the public arena after witnessing the death of three children on 10 August 1976, when they were hit by a car whose driver, a Provisional Irish Republican Army (IRA) member named Danny Lennon, had been fatally shot by a soldier of the King's Own Royal Border Regiment. As she turned the corner to her home, she saw the three Maguire children crushed by the swerving car and rushed to help. Their mother, Anne Maguire, who was with the children, died by suicide in January 1980.

Williams was so moved by the incident that within two days of the tragic event, she had obtained 6,000 signatures on a petition for peace and gained wide media attention. With Corrigan, she co-founded the Women for Peace; which, with Ciaran McKeown, later became the Community of Peace People.

Williams soon organised a peace march to the graves of the slain children, which was attended by 10,000 Protestant and Catholic women. However, the peaceful march was violently disrupted by members of the IRA, who accused them of being "dupes of the British". The following week, Williams led another march in Ormeau Park that concluded successfully without incident – this time with 20,000 participants.

At that time, Williams declared the following:

=== Declaration of the Peace People ===
First Declaration of the Peace People

- We have a simple message to the world from this movement for Peace.
- We want to live and love and build a just and peaceful society.
- We want for our children, as we want for ourselves, our lives at home, at work, and at play to be lives of joy and Peace.
- We recognise that to build such a society demands dedication, hard work, and courage.
- We recognise that there are many problems in our society which are a source of conflict and violence.
- We recognise that every bullet fired and every exploding bomb make that work more difficult.
- We reject the use of the bomb and the bullet and all the techniques of violence.
- We dedicate ourselves to working with our neighbours, near and far, day in and day out, to build that peaceful society in which the tragedies we have known are a bad memory and a continuing warning.

== Nobel Peace Prize ==
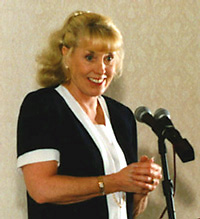
Williams around the time she received the Nobel Peace Prize

In recognition of her efforts for peace, Williams, together with her friend Mairead Corrigan, became joint recipients of the Nobel Peace Prize in 1977 (the prize for 1976). In her acceptance speech, Williams said,

That first week will always be remembered of course for something else besides the birth of the Peace People. For those most closely involved, the most powerful memory of that week was the death of a young republican and the deaths of three children struck by the dead man's car. A deep sense of frustration at the mindless stupidity of the continuing violence was already evident before the tragic events of that sunny afternoon of 10 August 1976. But the deaths of those four young people in one terrible moment of violence caused that frustration to explode, and create the possibility of a real peace movement...As far as we are concerned, every single death in the last eight years, and every death in every war that was ever fought represents life needlessly wasted, a mother's labour spurned.

The Peace Prize money was divided equally between Williams and Corrigan. Williams kept her share of the money, stating that her intention was to use it to promote peace beyond Ireland, but faced criticism for her decision. She and Corrigan had no contact after 1976. In 1978 Williams broke off links with the Peace People movement, and became instead an activist for peace in other areas around the world.

== Other awards ==
Williams received the People's Peace Prize of Norway in 1976, the Golden Plate Award of the American Academy of Achievement in 1977, the Schweitzer Medallion for Courage, the Martin Luther King, Jr. Award, the Eleanor Roosevelt Award in 1984, and the Frank Foundation Child Care International Oliver Award. In 1995, she was awarded the Rotary International "Paul Harris Fellowship" and the Together for Peace Building Award.

== Talks and guest lectures ==
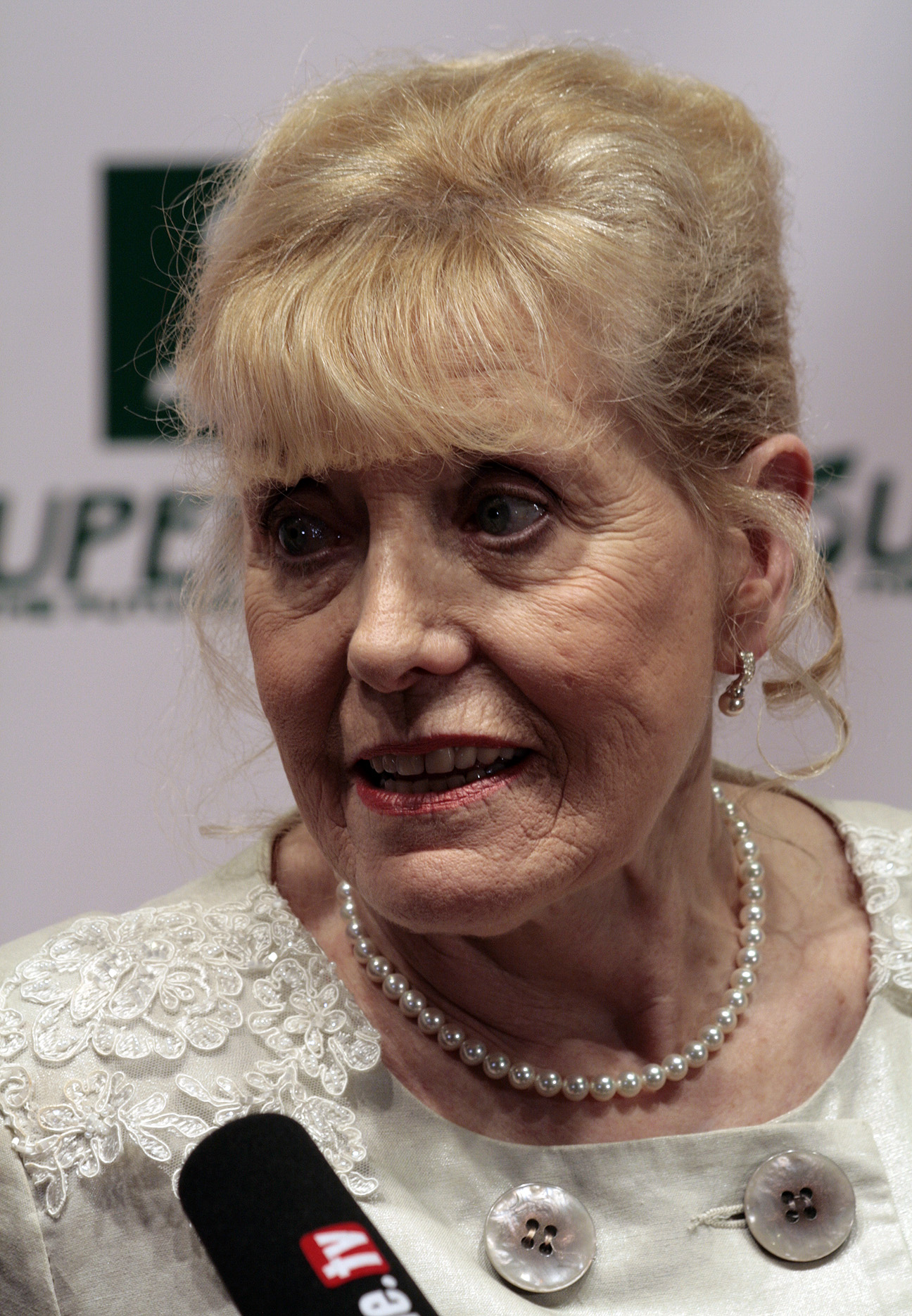
Williams in March 2009

At the 2006 Earth Dialogues forum in Brisbane, Williams told an audience of schoolchildren during a speech on Iraq War casualties that "Right now, I would like to kill George W. Bush." From 17 to 20 September 2007, Williams gave a series of lectures in Southern California: on 18 September, she presented a lecture to the academic community of Orange County entitled "Peace in the World Is Everybody's Business"; and on 20 September she gave a lecture to 2,232 members of the general public, including 1,100 high school sophomores, at Soka University of America. In 2010, she gave a lecture at WE Day Toronto, a WE Charity event that empowers students to be active within their communities, and worldwide.

Speaking at the University of Bradford before an audience of 200 in March 2011, Williams warned that young Muslim women on campus were vulnerable to attacks from angry family members, while the university does little to help protect them. "If you had someone on this campus these young women could go to say, 'I am frightened' – if you are not doing that here, you are dehumanising them by not helping these young women, don't you think?"

== Personal life ==
At the time she received the Nobel Prize, Williams worked as a receptionist and was raising her two children with her first husband Ralph Williams. This marriage was dissolved in 1981. She married businessman James Perkins in December 1982; they lived in Florida in the United States.

In 2004, she returned to live in Northern Ireland. Williams died on 17 March 2020, St. Patrick's Day, at the age of 76 in Belfast.

== In popular culture ==
- Williams was honoured/featured in the music video of Nickelback's hit song "If Everyone Cared".
- Williams and Mairead Corrigan were the subject of a French song, "Deux Femmes à Dublin", sung by French Pied-Noir singer Enrico Macias.

== See also ==
- List of female Nobel laureates
- List of peace activists
