= International Salon for Peace Initiatives =

The International Salon for Peace Initiatives is organized in the framework of the International Decade for the Promotion of a Culture of Peace and Non-Violence for the Children of the World (2001–2010) declared by the United Nations in 1998. Organized by the French Coalition for the Decade, it has been taken place in Paris every two years since 2004.

This Salon hosts the International Conference on the Culture of Peace and Non-Violence, organized by the French Coalition for the Decade in collaboration with the International Coalition for the Decade. This Conference create a space for thinking and meeting for all those involved in this field, in France, Europe and all over the world.

== 2nd International Salon for Peace Initiatives – 2006 ==
The 2d International Salon for Peace Initiatives has taken place in Paris on 2–4 June 2006, in the Centre des Congrès de la Villette, in the Cité des Sciences et de l'Industrie (Paris).

The second international Salon for Peace Initiatives was held under the auspices of the UNESCO the French Foreign Office and the City of Paris, in partnership with the Secours catholique-Caritas France, the CCFD, Non-violence XXI, Partage, Le Monde, La Vie, Télérama, RFI and TV5 and with the support of Pax Christi France.

This Salon has helped a wide public get familiar with the culture of peace and non-violence. 168 French and international exhibitors were presenting their peace and non-violence initiatives on 116 booths. They have proposed 40 interactive workshops and other activities with 13,000 participants.

=== International Conference – Actors for a Culture of Peace and Non-violence – 2006 ===
This Salon has hosted the International Conference "Actors for a Culture of Peace and Non-violence".

Seven round tables and sixty workshops helped the participants to discover the different aspects of the culture of peace and non-violence. Among the speakers were:

- Adolfo Pérez Esquivel, Nobel Peace Prize laureate, president of Serpaj-AL (Argentina)
- David Adams, Fundación Cultura de Paz (United States)
- Sister Marie-Bernard Alima Mbalula, Executive secretary of the Justice and Peace Commission (Democratic Republic of the Congo and Central Africa – Great Lakes)
- Ibrahima Fall, Special Representative of the UN Secretary-General for Great Lakes Region (Senegal)
- Hildegard Goss-Mayr, Niwano Peace Prize Laureate, IFOR (Austria)
- Sigrid Niedermayer, International Coordinator of the UNESCO Associated Schools Project Network (Paris, France)
- Rajagopal, Vice-president of the Gandhi Peace Foundation (India)
- Cornelio Sommaruga, International president of Initiatives of Change (Switzerland)
- Jean Vanier, founder of the Arch Community (Canada / France)

Hundreds organizations came from all over the world to participate to this conference.

== 3rd International Salon for Peace Initiatives – May–June 2008 ==
The 3rd International Salon for Peace Initiatives will take place in Paris on 30 May – 1 June 2008, in the Cité des Sciences et de l'Industrie. It will help a wide public to get familiar with the culture of peace and non-violence. Around 200 French and international exhibitors will present their peace and non-violence initiatives and several activities will be proposed, included 40 interactive workshops, films and exhibitions.

The third international Salon for Peace Initiatives will be held under the auspices of the UN, the UNESCO, the UNRIC, the French Commission for UNESCO, the French Foreign Office, the Regional council of Ile-de-France and the City of Paris, in partnership with the Secours catholique- Réseau mondial Caritas, Non-violence XXI, Partage, Le Monde, La Vie and RFI, and also with the support of Pax Christi France and the Secours islamique.

Several organizations will be partners of this Salon in order to enrich the culture of peace and non-violence and to highlight its numerous dimensions: justice, non-violent resolution of conflicts, mediation, human rights defense, environmental respect and development, disarmament, gender equality, international solidarity etc.

=== International Conference – Actor for a Culture of Peace and Non-violence – 2008 ===
This Salon will host the International Conference "Actor for a Culture of Peace and Nonviolence", organized by the French Coalition for the Decade in collaboration with the International Coalition for the Decade. This Conference will create a space for thinking and meeting for all those involved in this field, in France and all over the world.

Six round tables and sixty workshops will allow for the encounter and the debate among several scientific disciplines (sociology, psychology and pedagogy) and several citizen practices (associative, political) from the whole world. They will take into account the death anniversary of two major figures of non-violence: M. K. Gandhi (1948) and Martin Luther King Jr. (1968).

Speakers of this International Conference will be:

- Federico Mayor, president of the Fundación Cultura de Paz (Madrid) and member of the Honorary Board of the International Coalition for the Decade
- Marco Allenbach, High Educational School of Vaud (Lausanne, Switzerland)
- Gabriella Battaini, Director general for Education, Culture and Heritage, Youth and Sport, Council of Europe (Strasbourg, France)
- María José Brioso Valcárcel, Centro de Investigación y Documentación Educativa (CIDE), Ministry for the Education and the Sciences, Spain
- Richard Deats, former editor of FOR's Fellowship, author of biographies of M. K. Gandhi and Martin Luther King Jr., trainer in non-violence in Burma in 2007 (United States)
- Jean-Baptiste Eyraud, president of Droit au Logement (DAL)
- Chuck Fager, director of Fayetteville's Quaker House (United States)
- Jacques Généreux, economist, professor at the Paris Institute for Political Studies (Sciences Po), chronicler for France-Culture and Alternatives économiques, author of the Manifesto for a human economy (Paris, France)
- Hildegard Goss-Mayr, Niwano Peace Prize Laureate and Honorary Board of IFOR, Vienna (Austria)
- Nancy Irving, general Secretary of the Friends World Consultative Committee (FWCC), (London, Great-Britain)
- Jean-Baptiste Libouban, member of the Ark of Lanza del Vasto and of Voluntary Ripers, France
- Elisabeth Maheu-Vaillant, IUFM of Rouen, trainer in conflict regulation, IFMAN (Rouen, France)
- Manuel Manonelles, director of the Barcelone Board of Fundación Cultura de Paz
- May Moufarrej, Mouvement Social Libanais, Liban
- Daniele Novara, director of the Centro Psicopedagogico per la Pace e la gestione dei conflitti (Piacenza), (Italy)
- Alain Richard, franciscan and vice-president of the International Coalition for the Decade
- André Robertfroid, president of the Association Montessori Internationale (AMI) and former Deputy General Director of the UNICEF, Amsterdam/Belgium
- Alessandro Rossi, European coordinator, Nonviolent Peaceforce (Brussels, Belgium)
- Mohamed Sahnoun, Algerian diplomat, president of Initiatives of Change International, former special representative of the United Nations and the African Union for the Great Lakes region (Caux, Switzerland)
- Ramesh Sharma, secretary of Ekta Parishad, organizer of the Janadesh March and member of the National Committee of the Land Reform(India)
- Qian Tang, UNESCO Deputy Assistant Director-General for Education
- Jean Vanier, Arche (France / Canada)
- Claudette Werleigh, Secretary-general of Pax Christi International, former Prime Minister of Haiti and former director of the Conflict resolution programme at the Life and Peace Institute (Brussels, Belgium)
