= Jean Goss =

Jean Goss (November 20, 1912, in Caluire in France – April 3, 1991, in Paris) was a French nonviolent activist.

== Youth and conversion ==
The son of an opera baritone who lost his voice during the First World War, Jean Goss was forced to work beginning at the age of 12 in Paris, before being hired by a French railway Company in 1937. At 15, he joined a trade union.

Mobilized in 1939, he participated in the Second World War. In June 1940, the night before his surrender to the German Army in Lille, he lived what he called an overwhelming experience of God's love for him and for the whole of humanity. It would be the beginning of a lifelong commitment. As a war prisoner in German camps until 1945, he was sentenced to death but saved by a German officer who was moved by his testimony.

== Career ==
At the end of the war, he was looking for clergymen in the Roman Catholic Church convinced of the absolute respect of Human life. In 1950, he forced the entrance of the Holy Office in Rome to meet Cardinal Alfredo Ottaviani. In 1948, he met the International Fellowship of Reconciliation in France and sent back to the French Ministry his military papers and his war medals in support of the conscientious objectors. Living in Arcueil, a city of Paris' suburb, he was active in social movements for housing and also in the railway trade unions. He was one of the leader of the 1953 strikes.

He participated in several peace meetings in East Europe (Budapest 1953, Warsaw 1956, Moscow 1957, Prague 1958).

In 1958, he married Hildegard Mayr. They have got two children, Etienne and Myriam. His life with Hildegard was committed to promote Christian active nonviolence. They were in Rome during the Council Vatican II lobbying for the recognition of the conscientious objection by the Roman Catholic Church. In the 1960s and 1970s, they lived for sometime in Brazil (1964–1965) and in Mexico (1970–1971). They co-organized two continental conferences on non-violence (Montevideo 1966, Medellín 1974), from which was born the SERPAJ (Servizio Paz y Justizia). Its first coordinator was Adolfo Pérez Esquivel, who received the Nobel Peace Prize in 1980. They worked at that time with Don Hélder Câmara, Mgr Leonidas Proaño, Dom Antonio Fragoso, Fredy Kunz.

They gave trainings on nonviolence seminaries in many countries victimized of war or military conflicts; Ireland (since 1963), Balkans (since 1972), Austral Africa (since 1973), Lebanon (1974-1975 and 1980), San Salvador (1979). In the 1980s, they were active in Asia; the Philippines (since 1984), Thailand, Bangladesh, and Hong Kong. Specifically his work of the Nonviolent revolution in the Philippines in 1986, was one of the greater successes he had, as he guided and prepared the People Power movement.

In his last years, he went to Central Africa. In 1990, he was in Zaïre and, in April 1991, as he planned to go to Madagascar. He died in Paris on April 3, 1993.

With Hildegard Goss-Mayr, he was for many years a member of the International Board of the International Fellowship of Reconciliation and for some time its vice-president.

== Distinctions ==
- 1976 - Peace Prize Xirinacs (Pax Christi Spain)
- 1979 - Bruno Kreisky Award in Austria
- 1986 - Pax Christi USA Pope Paul VI Teacher of Peace Award
- 1990 - Prize Justicia y Paz a los valores humanos (Commission Justice and Peace Spain)

== Publications ==
- Jean Goss, Hildegard Goss-Mayr and the MIR : Une autre révolution: violence des non-violents, Paris, Ed. Cerf, 1969, 185 p.
- Jean Goss, Hildegard Goss-Mayr and Jean Lasserre : Une révolution pour tous les hommes, Toulouse : Centre d'Information pour l'ouverture au tiers-monde, 1969, 55 p.
- Jean Goss et Hildegard Goss-Mayr : Évangile et luttes pour la paix : séminaire d'entrainement à la non-violence évangélique et ses méthodes d'engagement, Paris, Les Bergers et les Mages, 1989, 98 p.
- Jean Goss, Témoin de la non-violence, Paris, MIR, 1993.

== Biography ==
- Gérard Houver : Jean et Hildegarde Goss : la non-violence, c'est la vie, Paris, Ed. Cerf, 1981, 159 p.
- Jean-Louis Jadoulle : Colloque Jean Goss : Paris 30 octobre 1993 : Note relative aux lettres de Jean Goss conservées dans les papiers de Jean Van Lierde, Charleroi, MIR-IRG, 1993, 38 p. (Numéro spécial de "MIR-IRG Infos").
- Actes du Colloque Jean Goss du 30 oct. 1993, Paris, MIR, 1995, 127 p.
- Hildegard Goss-Mayr : Wie Feinde Freunde werden : mein Leben mit Jean Goss für Gewaltlosigkeit, Gerechtigkeit und Versöhnung, Freiburg im Breisgau, Verlag Herder, 1996, 253 p.
- Hildegard Goss-Mayr : Oser le combat non-violent : aux côtés de Jean Goss, Paris, Ed. Cerf, 1998, 247 p.
- Hildegard Goss-Mayr, Jo Hanssens : Jean Goss. Mystique et militant de la non-violence, Namur, Fidélité, 2010, 135 p., preface of Adolfo Pérez Esquivel.

=== Articles ===
- Hildegard Goss-Mayr
- International Fellowship of Reconciliation

== See also ==
- List of peace activists
