= International Coalition for the Decade =

On 10 November 1998, the United Nations General Assembly proclaimed the first decade of the 21st century and the third millennium, the years 2001 to 2010, as the International Decade for the Promotion of a Culture of Peace and Non-Violence for the Children of the World.

Since 2001, some national NGOs coalitions promoting the Decade have been established in several countries, including Austria, France, Italy and the Netherlands. These national coalitions along with international organizations decided to found the International Coalition for the Decade for the Culture of Peace and Nonviolence in June 2003.

Its office is based in Paris and its president is Christian Renoux (France).

== Members of the International Coalition ==
National Coalitions (11) :

- Comitato italiano per il Decennio (Italy)
- Coordination béninoise pour la Décennie (Benin)
- Coordination canadienne pour la Décennie (Canada) observing member
- Coordination congolaise pour la Décennie (Democratic Republic of Congo) observing member
- Coordination française pour la Décennie (France)
- Coordination marocaine pour la Décennie (Morocco)
- Coordination togolaise pour la Décennie (Togo)
- Kooperation für des Frieden (Germany) observing member
- Österreichisches Netzwerk für Frieden und Gewaltfreiheit (Austria)
- Plateforme congolaise pour la Décennie (Congo-Brazzaville)
- Platform voor een Cultuur van Vrede en Geweldloosheid (Netherlands)

International Associations (15) :

- Association Montessori Internationale
- Caritas internationalis
- Church and Peace
- FIACAT (International Federation of ACAT, Action by Christians for the Abolition of Torture)
- Franciscans International
- Friends World Committee for Consultation (Quakers)
- Initiatives of Change International
- International Fellowship of Reconciliation (IFOR)
- Pax Christi International
- Pax Romana / ICMICA [(http://www.paxromanausa.org])
- Pontifical Council for Justice and Peace observing member
- Réseau Foi, Culture et Education (Central Africa)
- Servicio Paz y Justicia en América Latina (SERPAJ) observing member
- Women's International League for Peace and Freedom (WILPF)
- World Council of Churches (WCC) observing member

== Honorary Board ==
- Tenzin Gyatso, 14th Dalai Lama, Nobel Peace Prize Laureate
- Mairead Corrigan Maguire, Nobel Peace Prize Laureate
- Adolfo Pérez Esquivel, Nobel Peace Prize Laureate
- Joseph Rotblat (†), Nobel Peace Prize Laureate
- Desmond Tutu, Nobel Peace Prize Laureate
- Elise Boulding, Author
- Anwarul Karim Chowdhury, Former UN Under-Secretary-General and High Representative
- Hildegard Goss-Mayr, Niwano Peace Prize Laureate
- Rev. Dr. Samuel Kobia, Secretary-General of the World Council of Churches
- Cardinal Renato Raffaele Martino, President of the Pontifical Council for Justice and Peace
- Federico Mayor, President of the Fundación Cultura de Paz
- Queen Noor of Jordan
- Andrea Riccardi, Founder of the Community of Sant'Egidio, Niwano Peace Prize Laureate
- Marshall Rosenberg, Director of Educational Services, Center for Nonviolent Communication
