= International Coalition of Sites of Conscience =

US-based nonprofit organization

- Founded: 1999; 27 years ago
- Founder: Ruth J. Abram
- Type: Non-profit association
- Tax ID no.: 20-4874389
- Purpose: Museums, historic sites, memory initiatives
- Location: 55 Exchange Place, Suite 404, New York, NY 10005
- Region served: United States, Asia, Latin America, Europe, Middle East and North Africa, Africa
- Website: www.sitesofconscience.org

The International Coalition of Sites of Conscience (ICSC) is a global network of historic sites, museums, and memorials that are dedicated to promoting and protecting human rights across the world. The Coalition is registered as a non-profit association in the United States. The International Coalition of Sites of Conscience is an affiliated organization of the International Council of Museums and maintains consultative status in the United Nations Economic and Social Council.

== History ==
The International Coalition of Sites of Conscience, founded in 1999 by Ruth Abram, was an initiative that took place at the Lower East Side Tenement Museum in New York, under the consideration of incorporating current social issues in museums, relating the past to the present and its human rights challenges.

The Coalition supports its member sites through funding and training pilot programs to address human rights. It also provides consulting services to museums and cultural institutions in the areas of public dialogue programming, strategic planning, interpretative planning, and exhibition design. The Coalition has over 200 member sites. The Coalition won the 2009 ICOM-US International Service Citation. The ICOM-US International Service Citation was introduced in 1999 and is presented when a person, museum, or other organization is nominated whose work has promoted international relations and has had a significant impact within the museum field.

== Members and projects ==
The nine founding members were the Tenement Museum (US), the Gulag Museum at Perm-36 (Russia), the House of Slaves (Senegal), the Workhouse (England), la Memoria Abierta (Argentina), the District Six Museum (South Africa), the National Park Service (US), the Terezin Memorial (Czech Republic), and the Liberation War Museum (Bangladesh).

As of March 2025, the International Coalition of Sites of Conscience has over 350 members. The Coalition organizes its members into seven regions: Africa; Asia; Europe; Latin America & the Caribbean; Middle East and North Africa; North America; and Russia. Members conduct joint projects and create exhibits.

The North American region has collaborated on projects that focus on immigration and the school to prison pipeline. They hosted intergenerational dialogue forum which was coordinated with 11 cultural centers in the United States. This program was funded by the Institute of Museum and Library Services. The National Dialogues on Immigration was a coordinated initiative that involves 20 museums and historic sites to host programming about historical and present-day immigration.

The Coalition also participated analyzing the display and interpretation of the slave auction block in the town. The Coalition hosted a number of public dialogues where the Fredericksburg community talked about the auction block and the history of slavery to determine whether the auction block should be moved to a location where the history of slavery can be more fully told or if it should stay at its location.

In 2023, the ICSC began a new initiative called the Art of Inclusion: Reimagining Indigenous Representations. This is built off a national program titled Reclaiming Native Truth which works to, "foster cultural, social, and policy change by empowering Native Americans". The Art of Inclusion: Reimagining Indigenous Representations is a 12-month program. This project will reconsider Native American memorials and artwork and how they are mis-represented or outright ignored. First, three experts, "a public historian, a Native American artist, and a landscape specialist – will each reimagine a particular Native American monument" (Sites of Conscience, 2022) chosen by public nominations. In the next two phases, the ICSC will host discussions on how these sites could be redone, "to develop new tools and approaches for contextualizing Native American monuments and content in their own respective communities" (Sites of Conscience, 2022). The first discussion will be a public event for community members and museum professionals. The next will be a workshop with 75 museum professionals. Both will be in partnership with the Geneva Historical Society.

== Transitional justice ==
The International Coalition of Sites of Conscience also leads the Global Initiative for Justice, Truth, and Reconciliation (GIJTR), a consortium of nine international organizations that respond in multi-disciplinary ways to the transitional justice needs of societies emerging from conflict or periods of authoritarian rule. GIJTR helps facilitate community-based programs such as violence prevention workshops, art therapy, psychosocial support, community-based memorialization initiatives, and dialogue facilitation for local civil society organizations that seek to help communities heal from recent or ongoing conflict. The GIJTR initiative developed from studies that analyzed connections between memorials, civic engagement, and transitional justice mechanisms through youth engagement programs hosted by Sites of Conscience members. Through all of its programs, including GIJTR, the Coalition aims to use collective memory, place, and local history.

== See also ==
- Transitional justice
