= Cabasse =

Cabasse may mean:

- Cabasse (company), a manufacturer of high end loudspeakers, based in western France
- Cabasse, Var, a commune of the Var département in southeastern France
