= Jean Lasserre =

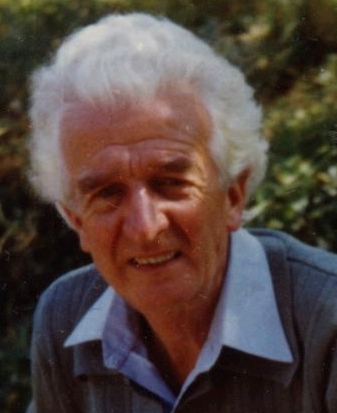
Jean Lasserre

Jean Lasserre (28 October 1908 in Geneva, Switzerland, † 22 November 1983 in Lyon, France) was a pastor of the Reformed Church of France, a peace theologian, the travel secretary of the French branch of the International Fellowship of Reconciliation and the editor of the Cahiers de la Réconciliation, a French-language magazine. His book, The War and the Gospel (French original 1953) made him internationally known.

== Origin ==
Lasserre's father, Henri Lasserre (born 4 July 1875 in Geneva, Switzerland, died 26 May 1945 in Toronto, Ontario, Canada) was, by nationality Swiss. His family came as Huguenots from Pont de Camarès (France) and emigrated to Switzerland in 1749. Early in his life, Henri Lasserre was interested in Tolstoy and life in communities and later immigrated to Canada. Jean Lasserre dedicated his book War and the Gospel to the memory of his father. His mother, Marie Schnurr (born 12 January 1878 in Lyon, France, died 19 February 1960 in Lyon) was an artist and botanist. After the divorce of his parents in 1909 Jean Lasserre lived in Lyon. In 1930, he became a French citizen.

== Studies and encounter with Dietrich Bonhoeffer ==
From 1926 to 1930 Jean Lasserre studied theology in Paris and from September 1930 to 1931, Lasserre was a seminarian at Union Theological Seminary in New York. There he met two other European scholars, Erwin Sutz and Dietrich Bonhoeffer. Despite the inter-War tensions between France and Germany, Bonhoeffer and Lasserre became friends. Following the academic year Jean Lasserre and Dietrich Bonhoeffer traveled around the United States and Mexico.

In the following years, there were various reunions: 1931 at an ecumenical conference in Cambridge, in 1932 in Les Houches in the valley of Chamonix, 1934 at the World Youth Conference of the World Association for Friendship through the Churches and in the same year in Bruay en-Artois. Eventually, Lasserre was only able to correspond with Dietrich Bonhoeffer via letter until he was arrested in April 1943. Jean Lasserre burned their letters during the German occupation of France out of concern for his family and himself.

== Parish, family, Resistance and struggle against alcoholism, racism and prostitution ==
After completing his theological studies from 1932 to 1938 Jean Lasserre served as pastor of the Reformed church in Bruay-en-Artois where, in 1938, he married Geneviève Lasserre Marchyllie (born March 8, 1912, in Calais, died April 11, 1991, in Lyon). They had three children together. Dietrich Bonhoeffer visited Lasserre there. Lasserre fought in the community against alcoholism and racism.

From 1938 to 1949 Lasserre was pastor in Maubeuge. During World War II, Lasserre confronted his pacificist convictions and hid for the Résistance two radio receivers from London in preparation for sabotaging ammunition transports. The explosion left no one dead. After Lasserre worked as a lawyer in court proceedings trying collaborators. He succeeded in at least in one case in averting the death penalty.

In 1946, he launched a campaign against prostitution (see his book Comment les maisons furent fermées, 1955). From 1949 to 1953 Lasserre served as a pastor in Épernay. In Épernay, Lasserre wrote about the war and the gospel and wrote his first book on peace theology. From 1953 to 1961 he was pastor of the "Fraternity in St. Étienne" and from 1969 to 1973 a pastor in Calais.

== Peace Work for the International Fellowship of Reconciliation ==
As a member of the French branch of the International Fellowship of Reconciliation, which was founded in 1921 by Henri Roser others, Lasserre served in 1961 as travel secretary of the International Fellowship of Reconciliation. On 29 March 1966 Martin Luther King Jr. visited Lyon and made a speech before 5 000 people, and Jean Lasserre was one of the organizers. Lasserre also participated in the struggle against the war in Algeria and in the fight against torture.

A selection of his lectures in 1965 was published in second book on peace theology, "Les Chrétien et la Violence."

From 1957 to 1968 and again from 1977 until 1978 Lasserre served as an editor of the Cahiers de la Réconciliation, the journal of the French-speaking Fellowship of Reconciliation.

In 1966 Lasserre toured Africa, remaining in contact with the Kimbanguistenkirche in the French Congo (now the Republic of Congo) and helped it to join the World Council of Churches. Even after Lasserre retired in 1973, he remained in constant contact with the Larzac struggle (against the expansion of a military training ground), the Ark community and the fight against nuclear weapons. From 1975 Lasserre crafted Franco-German meeting with theological studies on the Gospel and nonviolence.

== Significance ==
Together with the Mennonite theologian John Howard Yoder, Jean Lasserre contributed significantly to the position of Christian pacifists interpreting the meaning of the beatitude of Jesus in Matthew 5:9, "Blessed are the peacemakers," in the wake of the Ecumenical Conference of 1948 in Amsterdam regarding the three different positions within Christianity over the issue of violence. He created the concept of the Constantinian heresy, since the union of church and state as a result of the Constantine turning Christianity into the state religion.

== Works ==
- La Guerre et l'Evangile. Paris, 1953. German translation of War and the Gospel Chr Kaiser Verlag, Munich, 1956 (included in the Handbook of Christian theology of peace, CD-ROM, Digital Library, Berlin 2004, ISBN 3-89853-013-2 ). English Translation: War and the Gospel, James Clarke & Co. Ltd., London, 1962. New edition : War and the Gospel translation, Herald Press, Scottdale, Pa., 1974.
- Comment les "maisons" furent fermées, Geneva, 1955.
- Les Chrétien et la Violence. Editions de la Réconciliation, Paris 1965. Second edition with a preface by Frédéric Rognon, Lyon 2008. German translation: Christianity before the question of violence. The hour has come for a rethink. Translated from French by Dietlinde Haug, Ed Engelke Matthias and Thomas Nauerth. LIT Verlag, Berlin, 2010, ISBN 978-3-643-10689-6 .
- Un contre-sens tenace. Jésus chassant les marchands du temple. Jean 2, 13-17. Paris, 1967.

Armée ou défense civile non-violente ? Ouvrage collectif publié par Combat non-violent. La Clayette 1975.

- La Tour de Siloé. Jésus et de la résistance son temps. Lyon 1981.
- La Défense Nationale militaire est-elle crédible? Lyon, 1982.

More Articles:

- Questions sur le chrétien et la guerre. Cahiers de la Réconciliation. Mensuel Bulletin d'information du groupe français du Mouvement International de la Réconciliation. No. 11, Paris, 1949, pp. 4–6.
- L'enseignement du Nouveau Testament sur la guerre (Theses). Cahiers de la Réconciliation. No. 9-10, Paris, 1951, pp. 14–15.
- Le Bien dans Romains 13th, Cahiers de la Réconciliation. No. 1, Paris, 1956, pp. 2–6.
- Non violence armée et révolution. Alternative non violentes. Lyon 4 Quarter 1973, pp. 16–22.
- Non violence et Ancien Testament. Théologie et non violence. 2e session. Non violence et Ancien Testament. Actes de la tenue à l'Arbresle session du 22 au 27 mars 1976, Paris, 1985, pp. 3–9.
- David et la non violence. Compte-rendu d'un groupe de travail. Théologie et Non violence. 2e session. Non violence et Ancien Testament. Actes de la tenue à l'Arbresle session du 22 au 27 mars 1976th Paris, 1985, pp. 48–50.
- Notes critiques (sur l'ensemble de la session). Théologie et non violence, 3e session. L'attitude de premiers chrétiens face au service militaire. Actes de la tenue à Orsay session. Easter 1977, Paris 1986, pp. 108–111.
- Romains 13, 1-7. Théologie et non violence, 4e session. Resistance et soumission dans la Bible. Actes de la tenue au session Liebfrauenberg (Alsace) du 9 au 13 avril 1978, Paris, 1988, pp. 86–95. Item 1957-1982: Le courage de la vérité. June 1957.
