= Teacher of Peace Award =

U.S. Catholic peace award

The Teacher of Peace Award (previously called the Pope Paul VI Teacher of Peace Award) is a peacemaker award given out annually by Pax Christi USA, a Catholic peace organization, to an individual who has exemplified Pope Paul VI's World Day of Peace message: "To reach peace, teach peace."

== Recipients ==
- 1978 - Dorothy Day
- 1980 - Msgr. Paul Hanly Furfey
- 1982 - Sr. Mary Evelyn Jegen, SND
- 1983 - Eileen Egan and Gordon Zahn
- 1984 - Four U.S. missionaries murdered in El Salvador in 1980: Sr. Maura Clarke, Sr. Ita Ford, Sr. Dorothy Kazel and Sr. Jean Donovan
- 1986 - Jean Goss and Hildegard Goss-Mayr
- 1987 - Archbishop Raymond Hunthausen
- 1988 - Fr. Lawrence Jenco
- 1989 - Fr. Daniel Berrigan, SJ
- 1990 - Sr. Joan Chittister, OSB
- 1991 - Bishop Thomas Gumbleton
- 1992 - Dom Hélder Câmara
- 1993 - Colman McCarthy
- 1994 - James and Shelley Douglass
- 1995 - Jim and Kathy McGinnis
- 1996 - Sr. Helen Prejean, CSJ
- 1997 - Fr. Roy Bourgeois, M.M.
- 1998 - Kathy Kelly
- 1999 - Martin Sheen
- 2000 - Sr. Dianna Ortiz, OSU
- 2001 - Fr. Louis Vitale, Elizabeth McAlister, and Philip Berrigan
- 2002 - Fr. Peter Dougherty
- 2003 - William P. Quigley
- 2005 - Msgr. Ray East
- 2006 - Sr. Mary Lou Kownacki
- 2007 - Fr. John S. Rausch, GLMY
- 2008 - MJ Park and Jerry Park
- 2009 - Bishop Leroy Matthiesen
- 2010 - Jim Albertini
- 2011 - Colleen Kelly
- 2012 - Ruben Garcia
- 2013 - Mary Meg McCarthy
- 2016 - Art Laffin
- 2021 - Fr Bryan Massingale
- 2022 - Marie Dennis
- 2023 - Fr Joe Nangle

== See also ==
- Pax Christi International Peace Award
- Catholic peace traditions
