= La Géode =

Geodesic dome in Paris, France

Coordinates: 48°53′40″N 02°23′19″E

La Géode in July 2022

La Géode is a mirror-finished geodesic dome that holds an Omnimax theatre in Parc de la Villette at the Cité des Sciences et de l'Industrie (City of Science and Industry) in the 19th arrondissement of Paris, France.

The nearest Paris Métro stations to La Géode are Corentin Cariou on Line 7 and Porte de Pantin on Line 5.

In 2017, Pathé Gaumont was chosen as the new operator of the cinema. A refurbishment was announced, and the building closed for works to modernize its concept on 1 December 2018, with plans to reopen to the public in June 2020. In late 2023, a reopening of La Géode in Spring 2024 was announced. Finally, it reopened on 18 December 2024 after 6 years of work.

== Structure ==
La Géode was designed by architect Adrien Fainsilber, supported by engineer Gérard Chamayou. The geodesic dome is 36 metres (118 ft) in diameter, composed of 6,433 polished stainless steel triangles that form the sphere which reflects the sky. These triangles are 1.5 meters long and are fixed on a thin metal frame with the same triangular geodesic structure, consisting of 2,580 steel tube bars. The dome stands on a reinforced concrete base, which is attached to Cité des Sciences et de l'Industrie, the largest science museum in Europe. La Géode officially opened on 6 May 1985. After a similar venue located in La Défense closed in 2001, La Géode became the only spherical building in the Île-de-France region of France.

Before the name "Géode" was selected, other names were proposed, including humorous suggestions such as "Bouboule", "Irma", "Minouchette", "Double Zéro", and "Zézette".

== Theatre ==
Until closing for refurbishment in 2018, movies were projected in IMAX format on a giant hemispherical screen covering 1,000 square metres (11,000 sq ft). The auditorium was fitted with a 12-point sound system with four large subwoofers that deliver 21,000 watts in surround sound designed by Cabasse. The IMAX films were presented in high definition and Géode 3D-relief, feature science, nature, and travel documentaries, short and long feature-length films, and high definition animated subjects. It also presented satellite concert events, including live broadcasts of the Metropolitan Opera from New York City.

== See also ==
- Parc de la Villette
- Cité des Sciences et de l'Industrie, City of Science and Industry, the largest science museum in Europe
- Cité de la musique, City of Music, an interactive museum of historical musical instruments and a concert hall
- Le Zénith, a concert arena in Parc de la Villette
