= William P. Quigley =

American activist

- Occupation: Professor of Law
- Employer: Loyola University New Orleans College of Law
- Spouse: Debbie Dupre Quigley
- Children: Patrick Dupré Quigley, Joseph Quigley

William P. Quigley is a law professor and Director of the Law Clinic and the Gillis Long Poverty Law Center at Loyola University New Orleans. He was named the Pope Paul VI National Teacher of Peace by Pax Christi USA in 2003.

== Career ==
An active public interest lawyer since 1977, Quigley has served as counsel to public interest organizations on issues ranging from Hurricane Katrina social justice issues, voting rights, public housing, death penalty, living wage, educational reform, civil liberties, constitutional rights, and civil disobedience. Quigley has litigated cases with the NAACP Legal Defense and Educational Fund, the Advancement Project, and was the General Counsel to the ACLU of Louisiana.

Quigley teaches courses in the Law Clinic, in the areas of Law and Poverty and Catholic Social Teaching and Law. His foci have been on living wage, the right to a job, legal services, community organizing as part of effective lawyering, civil disobedience, high-stakes testing, international human rights, revolutionary lawyering, and a continuing history of how the laws have regulated the poor since colonial times. In the past, he has been an adviser on human and civil rights to Human Rights Watch USA, Amnesty International USA, and served as the Chair of the Louisiana Advisory Committee to the US Commission on Civil Rights.

Quigley has received many awards. He is the recipient of the 2006 Camille Gravel Civil Pro Bono Award from the Federal Bar Association New Orleans Chapter, received the 2006 Stanford Law School National Public Service Award, and the 2006 National Lawyers Guild Ernie Goodman award.

He is an active volunteer lawyer with School of the Americas Watch and the Institute for Justice & Democracy in Haiti.

Quigley is the author of Ending Poverty As We Know It: Guaranteeing A Right to A Job At A Living Wage (Temple University Press, 2003). He is the recipient of the 2004 SALT Teaching Award presented by the Society of American Law Teachers.

He is married to Debbie Dupre Quigley, an oncology nurse.
