= Adrien Fainsilber =

French architect and urbanist (1932–2023)

- Born: 15 June 1932; Le Nouvion-en-Thiérache, France
- Died: 11 February 2023 (aged 90)
- Education: Beaux-Arts de Paris
- Occupation: Architect

Adrien Fainsilber (15 June 1932 – 11 February 2023) was a French architect and urbanist.

== Biography ==
Born in Le Nouvion-en-Thiérache on 15 June 1932, Fainsilber graduated from the Beaux-Arts de Paris in 1960 and subsequently worked for Hideo Sasaki in Watertown, Massachusetts. Upon his return to France, he became director of studies at the Institut d'aménagement et d'urbanisme de la région d'Ile-de-France and participated in the first Schéma directeur de la région Île-de-France.

In 1970, Fainsilber founded his own architectural agency after winning the Villetaneuse campus competition alongside Högna Sigurðardóttir. He carried out numerous projects, including the Centre Benjamin Franklin of the University of Technology of Compiègne, as well as the Centre hospitalier d'Évry and different buildings of Saint-Quentin-en-Yvelines. In 1980, he was selected for a competition at the Cité des Sciences et de l'Industrie by President Valéry Giscard d'Estaing, then for one at La Géode.

In 1992, Fainsilber founded a single member limited liability company, of which he was the sole manager and partner. In 2000, he expanded his practice and named his business Adrien Fainsilber & Associés. The year after his retirement in 2007, the company was renamed Ateliers AFA. His archives are now kept at the Institut français d'architecture.

Fainsilber died on 11 February 2023, at the age of 90.

== Distinctions ==
- Member of the Académie d'architecture (1985)
- Grand prix national de l'architecture (1986)
- Knight of the Legion of Honour (1987)
- Officer of the Ordre des Arts et des Lettres (1997)
- Medal of Honor of the Académie d'architecture (2020)
