= Mohammed Abu-Nimer =

Palestinian American academic

- Occupation: Scholar
- Title: Abdul Aziz Said Chair in International Peace and Conflict Resolution
- Awards: Niwano Peace Prize (2024)

Academic background
- Education: Hebrew University of Jerusalem (BA, MA); George Mason University (PhD)

Academic work
- Discipline: Conflict resolution, peacebuilding
- Institutions: American University

Mohammed Abu-Nimer is a Palestinian-American scholar of peacebuilding and conflict resolution. He is a professor in the School of International Service at American University, where he holds the Abdul Aziz Said Chair in International Peace and Conflict Resolution. His work has focused on interfaith dialogue, peacebuilding in Muslim communities, and the Israeli–Palestinian conflict. In 2024, he received the 41st Niwano Peace Prize.

== Career ==
Abu-Nimer received a BA and an MA from Hebrew University of Jerusalem and a PhD in conflict analysis and resolution from George Mason University. After teaching at Guilford College, he joined American University in 1997.

At American University, Abu-Nimer directed the Peacebuilding and Development Institute from 1999 to 2013 and later became the inaugural holder of the Abdul Aziz Said Chair in International Peace and Conflict Resolution. He is also the co-founder and co-editor of the Journal of Peacebuilding & Development.

In addition to his academic work, Abu-Nimer has served as a senior adviser to the KAICIID Dialogue Centre, and American University has described him as the founder of the Salam Institute for Peace and Justice.

== Recognition ==
In 2009, Abu-Nimer received the Institute for Conflict Analysis and Resolution Distinguished Alumni Award from George Mason University. In 2023, he received the PEACE Distinguished Scholar Award from the International Studies Association. In 2024, he received the 41st Niwano Peace Prize. In 2025, he received the Peace Educator-Scholar Award from the Peace and Justice Studies Association.

== Selected works ==
- Dialogue, Conflict Resolution, and Change: Arab-Jewish Encounters in Israel (1999).
- Reconciliation, Justice, and Coexistence: Theory and Practice (2001, editor).
- Nonviolence and Peace Building in Islam: Theory and Practice (2003).
- Unity in Diversity: Interfaith Dialogue in the Middle East (2007, with Amal Khoury and Emily Welty).
