= Kang Won-yong =

South Korean minister (1917–2006)

Kang Won Yong 강원용
- Born: July 3, 1917; South Korea
- Died: August 17, 2006 (aged 89); Seoul, South Korea
- Known for: Christian leader, pioneer of the ecumenical movement in Korea, and an advocate for peace and reconciliation in the Korean peninsula
- Spouse: Gimmyeongju
- Children: Ganghyeja, Ganghyewon, and Gangdaein

Dr. Kang Won Yong (July 3, 1917 – August 17, 2006) was a Christian leader, pioneer of the ecumenical movement in Korea, and an advocate for peace and reconciliation in the Korean peninsula.

In 1945, Kang established the Kyoung Dong Presbyterian Church in Seoul. This church would become the starting point for the spread of the Presbyterian Church within South Korea. After this, he served as General Secretary of the Korean Student Christian Federation in 1948. In 1964 and again in 1980, he was President of the National Council of Churches in Korea.

In 1962, Kang founded the Korean Christian Academy to facilitate dialog between South Korea's many religions. He served as its director and president. Through the Academy's committee for interfaith dialogue, Yong sponsored over one hundred meetings among leaders of South Korea's six leading religions. He was arrested in 1979 by the National Intelligence Service of Korea for alleged subversive activity.

Kang served two terms as President of the Christian Conference of Asia from 1968 to 1983. From 1975 to 1983, he was a member of the Central Committee and of the Executive Committee of the World Council of Churches. In the early 1970s, he initiated and contributed towards the founding of the ecumenical academy Association of Christian Institutes and Study Centres in Asia (ACISCA). Also in the 1970s, Kong lead movements for human rights and democracy in Korea, holding hundreds of dialogs with military leaders to encourage reconciliation and a return to democratic process.

Kang promoted interfaith dialog towards reconciliation in a divided Korea, serving as president of the Asian Conference on Religion and Peace and a chairman of the Korean Foundation for Working Together.

Yong was an advocate of ecumenism and co-operation between religions. He worked to provide ways for the church to reach the disenfranchised in Asia so that it could provide a voice for them.

Kong was awarded the Niwano Peace Prize in 2000. In 1998, he was selected as one of the 24 people who helped shape Korean history in a public poll conducted by Manifestation d'Art Nouveau International et Forum. He was awarded the Mugunghwa Medal of the Order of Civil Merit by the Government of South Korea posthumously. He died in 2006, survived by his wife and three children.

== Books published ==
- I Believe in Christ
- The New Era of the Builder (1949)
- Ruins of the Appeal
- Free the truth
- Life and Religion
- From Seeds (1993)
- I Believe I Have Faith (1998)
- History in the Hills (2003)
- The Dialog for Gangwon Province
- Gangwonyong Collections
