= Chao-hwei =

Taiwanese nun (born 1957)

Shih Chao-hwei
- 釋昭慧
- Born: Lu Qiongzhao; 28 May 1957 (age 69); Yangon, Union of Burma
- Citizenship: Taiwan
- Education: National Taiwan Normal University
- Occupation: Nun
- Years active: 1980–present
- Organization: Hongshi Buddhist Academy
- Honours: Niwano Peace Prize (2021)

Chao-hwei (Chinese: 釋昭慧; pinyin: Shì Zhāohuì; born 28 May 1957) is a Taiwanese nun. Born Lu Qiongzhao (盧瓊昭; Lú Qióngzhāo) to Chinese parents living in Burma, she and her family moved to Taiwan in 1965. While studying Chinese literature at National Taiwan Normal University, she became ordained as a Buddhist nun, receiving the Dharma name Chao-hwei. Chao-hwei has gone on to become actively involved in various social movements in Taiwan, including publicly supporting feminism and same-sex marriage and opposing the legalisation of gambling; she has also called for the reform within Buddhism, including the abolition of the Eight Garudhammas. In 2021, she received the Niwano Peace Prize. She is currently a professor of religious studies at Hsuan Chuang University.

== Early life and education ==
Chao-hwei was born on 28 May 1957 in Yangon in what was then the Union of Burma. She was the second of four children born to ethnic Chinese parents Lu Huangming and Liang Renyun. In 1965, due to a rise of anti-Chinese sentiment in Burma during the rule of Ne Win, Chao-hwei and her family moved to Taiwan.

After graduating from Zhongshan Girls' High School, Chao-hwei began studying Chinese literature at National Taiwan Normal University in Taipei. During her second year of study, she participated in a summer camp organised by Fo Guang Shan, a Buddhist community, following which she began reading books about Buddhism. During the summer holidays of her third year, Chao-hwei trained as a nun under Master Xiangyun at the Xiangguang Hermitage in Banqiao. Chao-hwei graduated university in 1979, following which she began teaching at a high school in Taoyuan.

As of 2021, Chao-hwei is a lecturer of religious studies at Hsuan Chuang University in Hsinchu.

== Theology ==
As a nun, Chao-hwei was a disciple of Yin Shun, becoming an important member of his Buddhist school of thought. An analysis of Yin Shun's philosophy in The Dictionary of Taiwanese Buddhism identified Chao-hwei as represented one of the three main branches of thought within the Yin Shun School, alongside two other branches represented by Master Shi and Master Hongyin. Chao-hwei went on to establish the Buddhist Hongshi Academy, which teaches this branch of thought; notable disciples of Chao-hwei have included Xingguang, Chuanfa, Qingde and Jian'an.

== Activism ==
=== Buddhist activism ===
Chao-hwei has campaigned for a fairer representation of Buddhists, and particularly on nuns, within Taiwan. In 1987, Chao-hwei was critical of what she perceived to be an anti-Buddhist surge in the Taiwanese media, including the premiere of the Kunqu opera Sifan, which she described as being insulting to Buddhism, as well as a popular article published in the Central Daily News which claimed that over half of the nuns in Kaohsiung had become ordained due to experiencing divorce, separation, or singlehood, which Chao-hwei saw as damaging to the image and reputation of ordained nuns. After Taipei National University of the Arts premiered an adaptation of the Kunqu opera The Nun's Yearning for a Secular Life, which depicted a nun experiencing worldly desires and regretting her ordination, Chao-hwei wrote a public letter calling it "discriminatory" and urging Buddhists to demand that performances be stopped. Chao-hwei and students from the Buddhist Hongshi Academy launched a protest movement, including sending letters and boycotting certain publications, demanding more "balanced" reporting on monks and nuns. In June 1988, Chao-hwei established the Protecting Buddhism Group within the Buddhist Association of the Republic of China, with the aim of "protecting Buddhism and purifying people's hearts". Chao-hwei's approach of publicly challenging misreporting about Buddhism and Buddhists was seen as "marking a new style of monks and nuns", in contrast to the previous norm of monks and nuns remaining silent on such issues.

In 1994, members of the Christian Bread of Life Church began campaigning for the demolition of a Guanyin statue at the Daxiong Temple in Taipei No. 7 Park, with the statue being defaced with faeces and acid. In response, Chao-hwei launched a counter-campaign, "Guanyin, don't go" (觀音不要走; Guānyīn bùyào zǒu) calling for the statue to remain in place, going on hunger strike in the park with politician Lin Cheng-chieh and members of Fo Guang Shan. Following negotiations, it was agreed that the Guanyin statue would be preserved and maintained in the park.

In August 2018, Xuecheng, the president of the Buddhist Association of China and abbot at Longquan Temple, was accused of sexually assaulting female disciples. In response to senior Buddhists urging the victims to remain silent in order to "take care of the overall situation", Chao-hwei publicly criticised both Xuecheng's actions and the requests of Buddhist leaders, stating that both issues stemmed from the "unequal power" between men and women in Buddhism.

=== Political activism ===
Earlier in her career Chao-hwei had criticised monks and nuns for becoming involved in politics, stating it prevented them from fulfilling their duties as religious teachers; in 2004, she criticised Master Weijue from the Chung Tai Chan Monastery for publicly supporting the Pan-Blue Coalition of Lien Chan and James Soong. She became more political as time progressed; in 2011, she called on people to vote for the Green Party Taiwan in the 2012 Taiwanese legislative election, accusing Kuomintang and the Democratic Progressive Party of not doing enough to protect the vulnerable in Taiwanese society, as well as the environment.

On 11 August 2012, Chao-hwei officiated a same-sex marriage, becoming the first Taiwanese monk to do so. On 14 November 2016, she participated in the Legislative Yuan's public hearing on same-sex marriage, advocating for its legalisation, citing Buddhist and philosophical perspectives.

== Recognition ==
In 2021, Chao-hwei was awarded the Niwano Peace Prize in recognition of her work promoting peace in nature and humanity, including animal protection, gender ethics, gender equality and religious dialogue. She was the second Taiwanese winner of the award after fellow nun Cheng Yen, the founder of Tzu Chi.

Chao-hwei has received significant attention for her public campaigning and statements, which have received praise and criticism. During a demonstration, she stated that opponenents of a proposed housing development, including Yao Li-ming, Clara Chou and Ko Wen-je, would have increased chances of developing diseases such as cancer due to the "evil energy of their words"; while politician Luo Shu-lei alleged that Chao-hwei had warned during a demonstration that she and other politicians supporting a bill would "have no descendants".
