= Marii Hasegawa =

Japanese peace activist (1918–2012)

- Marii Kyogoku (later Hasegawa), from the 1938 yearbook of the University of California, Berkeley
- Born: September 17, 1918; Hiroshima, Japan
- Died: July 1, 2012 (aged 93); South Hadley, Massachusetts
- Education: BA from University of California at Berkeley in 1938
- Known for: peace activist, national president of the Women's International League for Peace and Freedom 1971–1975
- Successor: Naomi Marcus

Marii Hasegawa (September 17, 1918 – July 1, 2012), born Kyogoku Marii, was a peace activist known for her fifty years of work with the Women's International League for Peace and Freedom, including serving as its president during the Vietnam War.

== Early life and education ==
Kyogoku was born in Hiroshima, Japan, the daughter of Itsuzo Kyogoku and Kiyo Kyogoku. Her family moved to the United States in 1919, after her father, a Buddhist priest, was assigned to serve Buddhists in California. She lived in Lompoc as a teenager, and graduated from the University of California, Berkeley with a BA in home economics in 1938.

In 1942, Kyogoku and her family were interned at the Topaz War Relocation Center by the U.S. government due to Executive Order 9066. They were forcibly confined there for three years, and in 1945 the family was released and moved to Philadelphia.

== Career and activism ==
While in Philadelphia, Hasegawa began work with the Women's International League for Peace and Freedom (WILPF), a peace-seeking non-governmental organization that had vehemently opposed the internment of Japanese Americans and helped to relocate and readjust freed Japanese. She would hold varying roles within WILPF for the next fifty years, such as the chair of its Membership and Extension Committee from 1960 to 1965, its consultant to committees from 1965 to 1968, and its national president from 1971 to 1975. Her presidency of the organization was during the Vietnam War. Hasegawa organized protests against the war and led a peace delegation to North Vietnam.

Hawegawa received the Niwano Peace Prize in 1996.

== Personal life and legacy ==
She moved to South Hadley, Massachusetts in 2001, where she continued to be active in working for peace and inter-religious cooperation until her death on July 1, 2012. In 2012, a documentary, Marii Hasegawa: Gentle Woman of a Dangerous Kind, was shown at film festivals. She was named one of the Library of Virginia's Virginia Women in History in 2018.

== See also ==
- List of peace activists
