= Cité de la Musique =

Group of institutions dedicated to music in Paris, France

Coordinates: 48°53′23″N 2°23′38″E

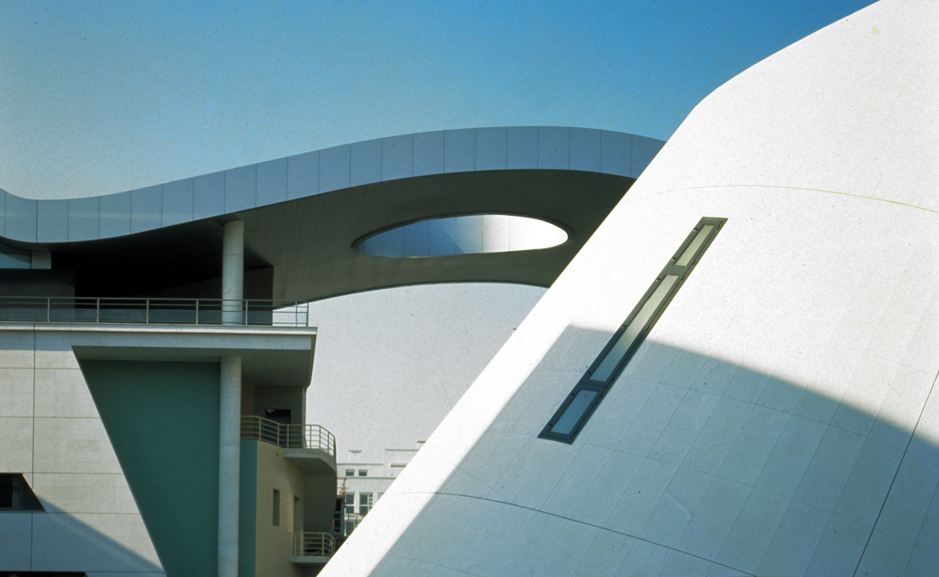
The Cité de la Musique in Paris

The Cité de la Musique (French pronunciation: [site də la myzik], "City of Music"), also known as Philharmonie 2, is a group of institutions dedicated to music and situated in the Parc de la Villette, 19th arrondissement of Paris, France. It was designed with the nearby Conservatoire de Paris (CNSMDP) by the architect Christian de Portzamparc and opened in 1995. Part of François Mitterrand's Grands Projets, the Cité de la Musique reinvented La Villette – the former slaughterhouse district.

It consists of an amphitheater, a concert hall that can accommodate an audience of 800–1,000, a music museum containing an important collection of music instruments from different cultural traditions, dating mainly from the fifteenth- to twentieth-century, a music library, exhibition halls and workshops. The Cité de la Musique, as an EPIC, was also entrusted by the State with the management of the Salle Pleyel, which reopened on 13 September 2006, after major renovations. In 2015, it was renamed Philharmonie 2 as part of the Philharmonie de Paris when a larger symphony hall was built by Jean Nouvel and named Philharmonie 1. Its official address is 221, Avenue Jean Jaurès, 75019 Paris.

== Philharmonie 2 ==
The Cité de la Musique, also known as Philharmonie 2, with an area of 28,748 m^{2}, includes:

- a 250-seat amphitheater;
- a fully modular concert hall, which can accommodate from 900 to 1,600 spectators;
- the music museum containing an important collection of classical musical instruments dating mainly between the 16th and 21st centuries;
- a large musical media library and professional documentation spaces;
- exhibition halls;
- educational workshops;
- a bookshop.

Placed under the supervision of the Ministry of Culture. Designed by the architect Christian de Portzamparc and inaugurated on December 7, 1995, it brings together a set of facilities and services dedicated to music and is located on the Place de la Fontaine-aux-Lions at the Porte de Pantin in the district du Pont-de-Flandres in the 19th arrondissement of Paris, on the edge of the Parc de la Villette.

== Musée de la Musique ==
The Musée de la Musique features a collection of about 8,390 items, comprising around 4,442 musical instruments, 1,097 instrument elements or 939 pieces of art (paintings, sculptures, etc.) collected by the Conservatoire de Paris since 1793 as well as some archives and a library of 110,000 written and audiovisual documents. The museum's collection, which opened to the public in 1864, and was relocated at the Cité de la Musique in 1997, contains instruments used in Western classical, modern and non-European music from the sixteenth century to the present time. It includes lutes, archlutes, almost 200 classical guitars, violins by Italian luthiers Antonio Stradivari, the Guarneri family, Nicolò Amati; French and Flemish harpsichords; pianos by French piano-makers Sébastien Érard and Ignaz Pleyel; saxophones by Adolphe Sax, etc. and many are also presented online.

The instruments are exhibited in five departments by period and by type. Personal audio devices are provided to visitors at the entrance, allowing them to listen to commentary and musical excerpts played on the instruments, complemented by video screens and scale models along the way.

== Gallery ==
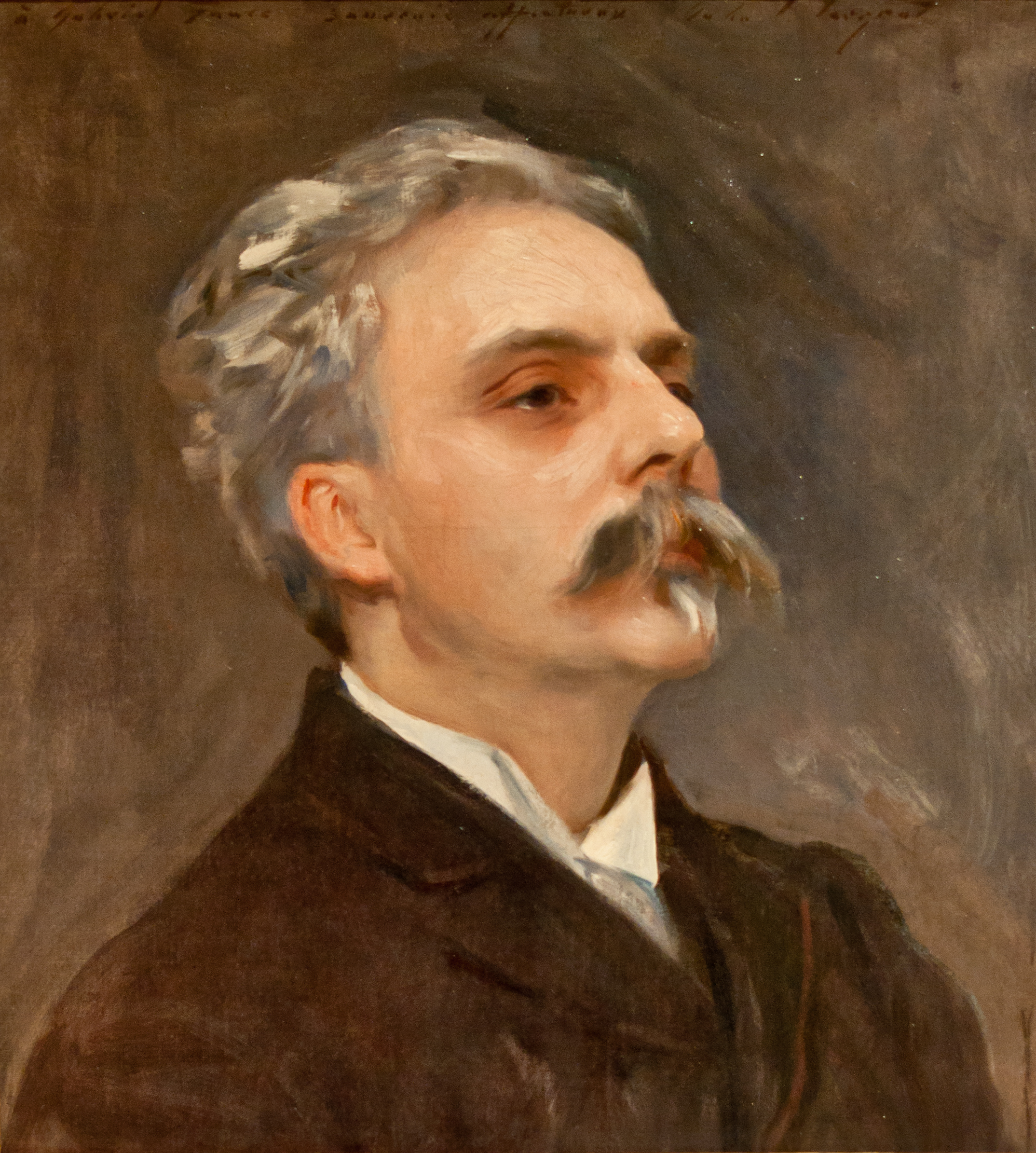
Gabriel Fauré by John Singer Sargent, c. 1889

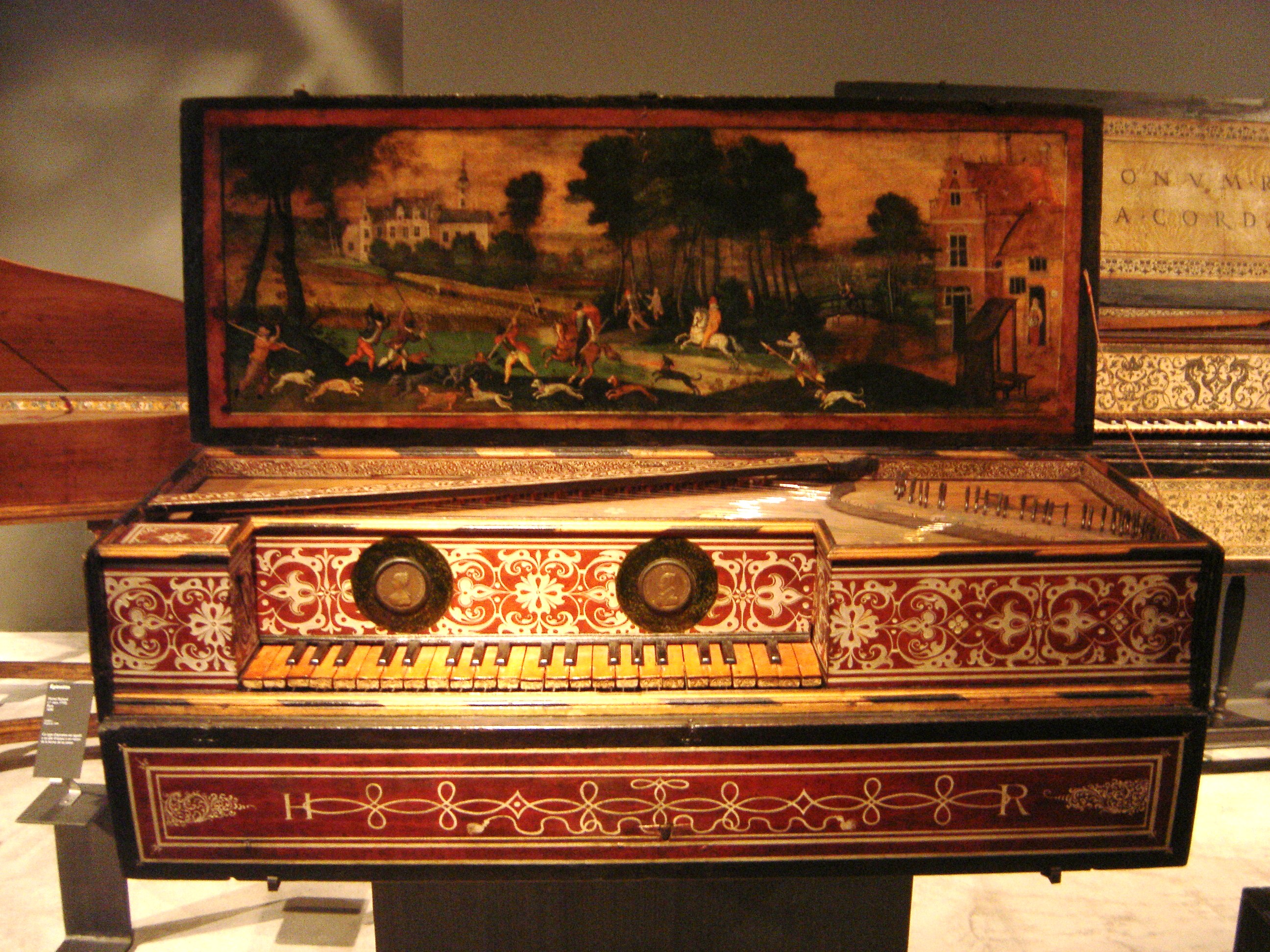
Virginal by Hans Ruckers, 1583, Antwerp.

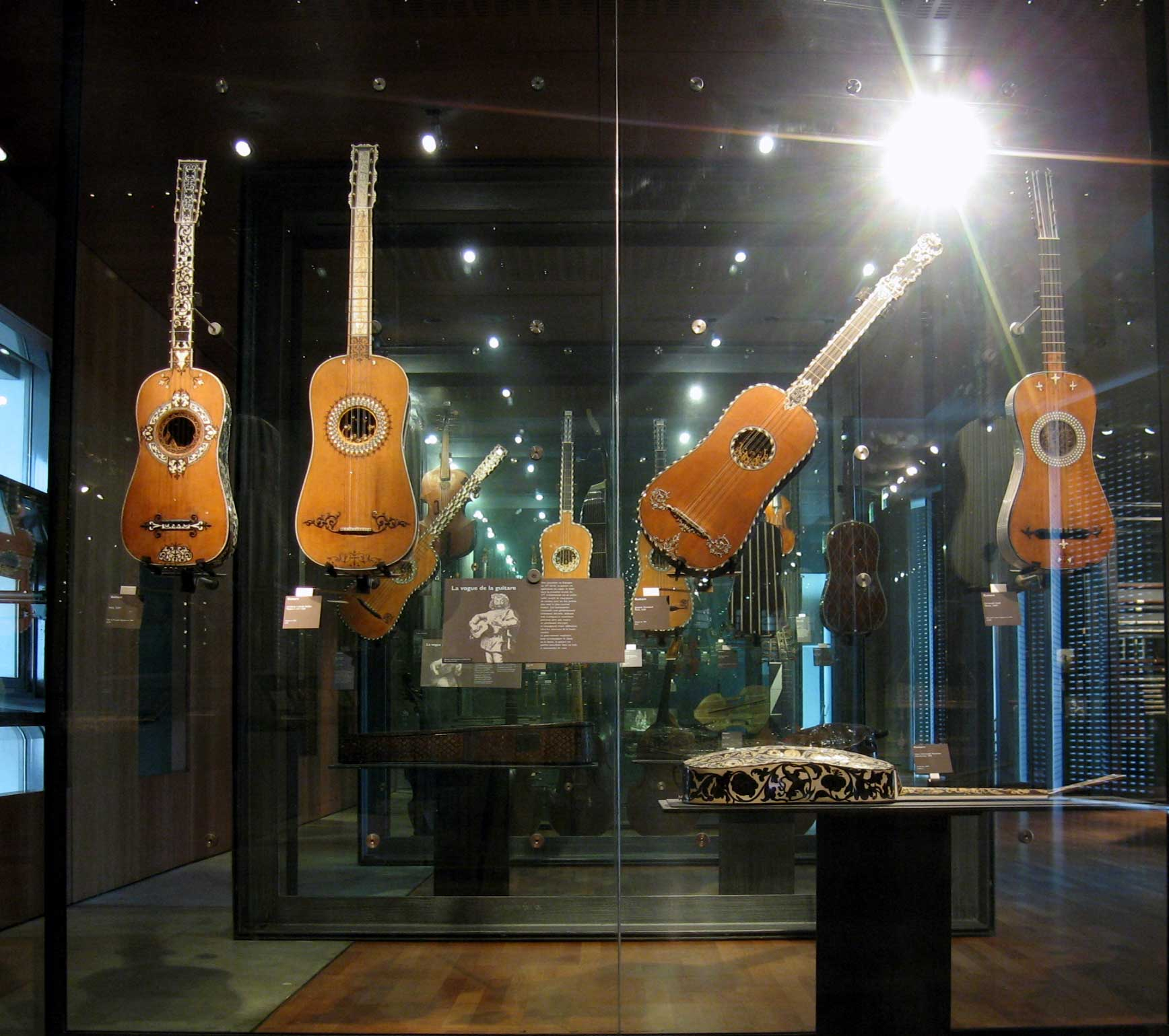
17th century guitars

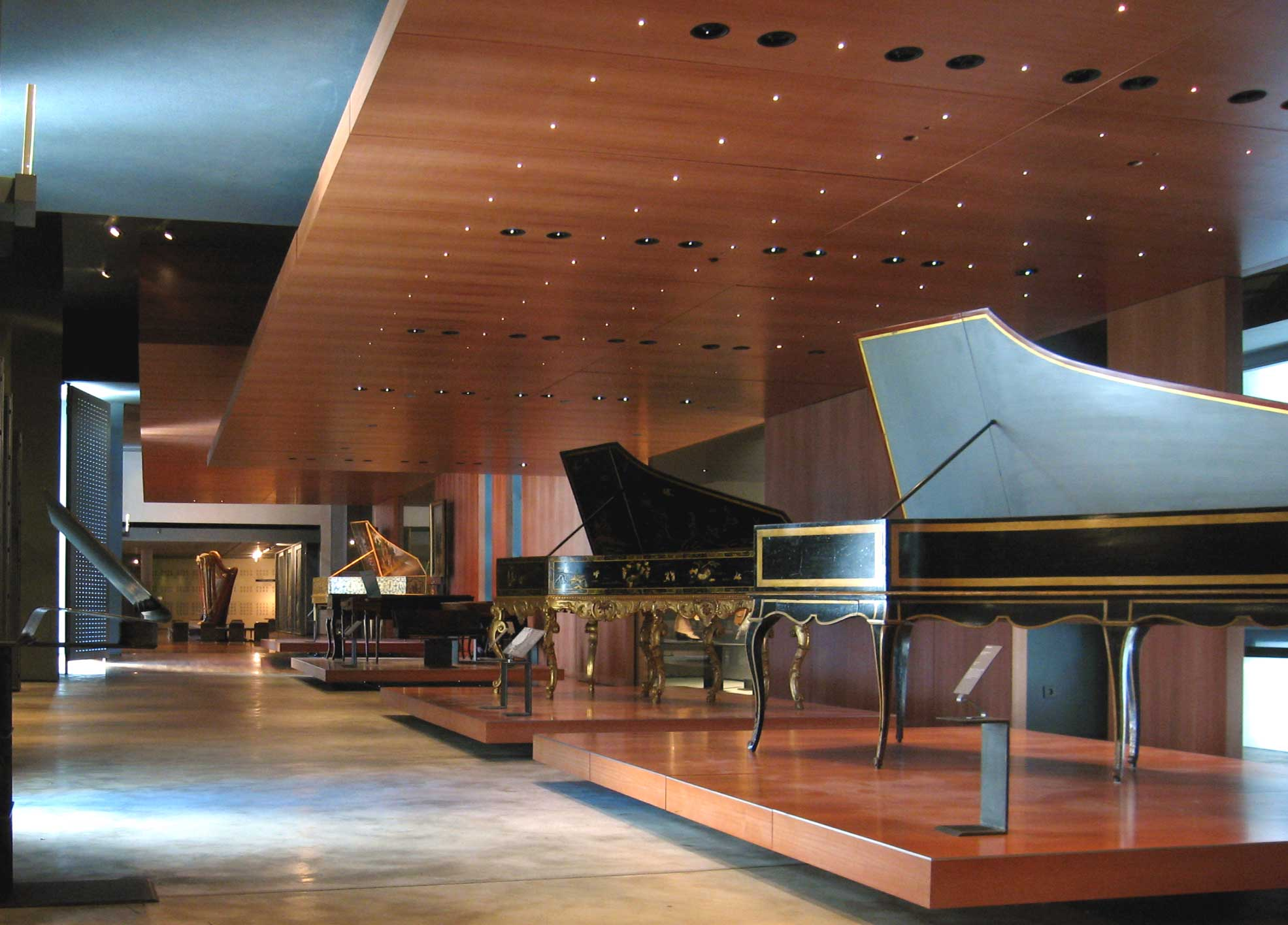
Harpsichords from the second half of the 18th century

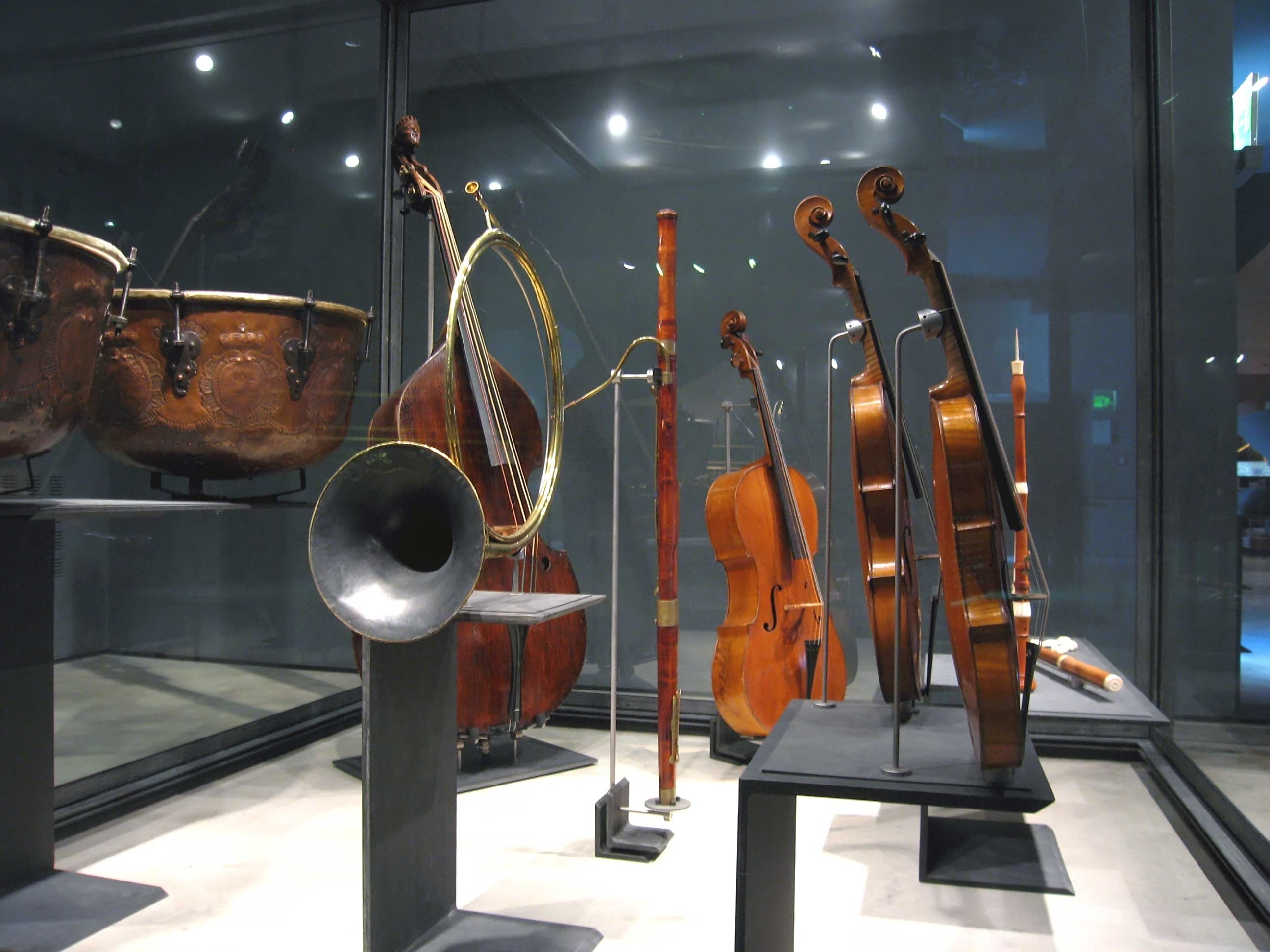
18th century instruments with a hunting horn by Carlin

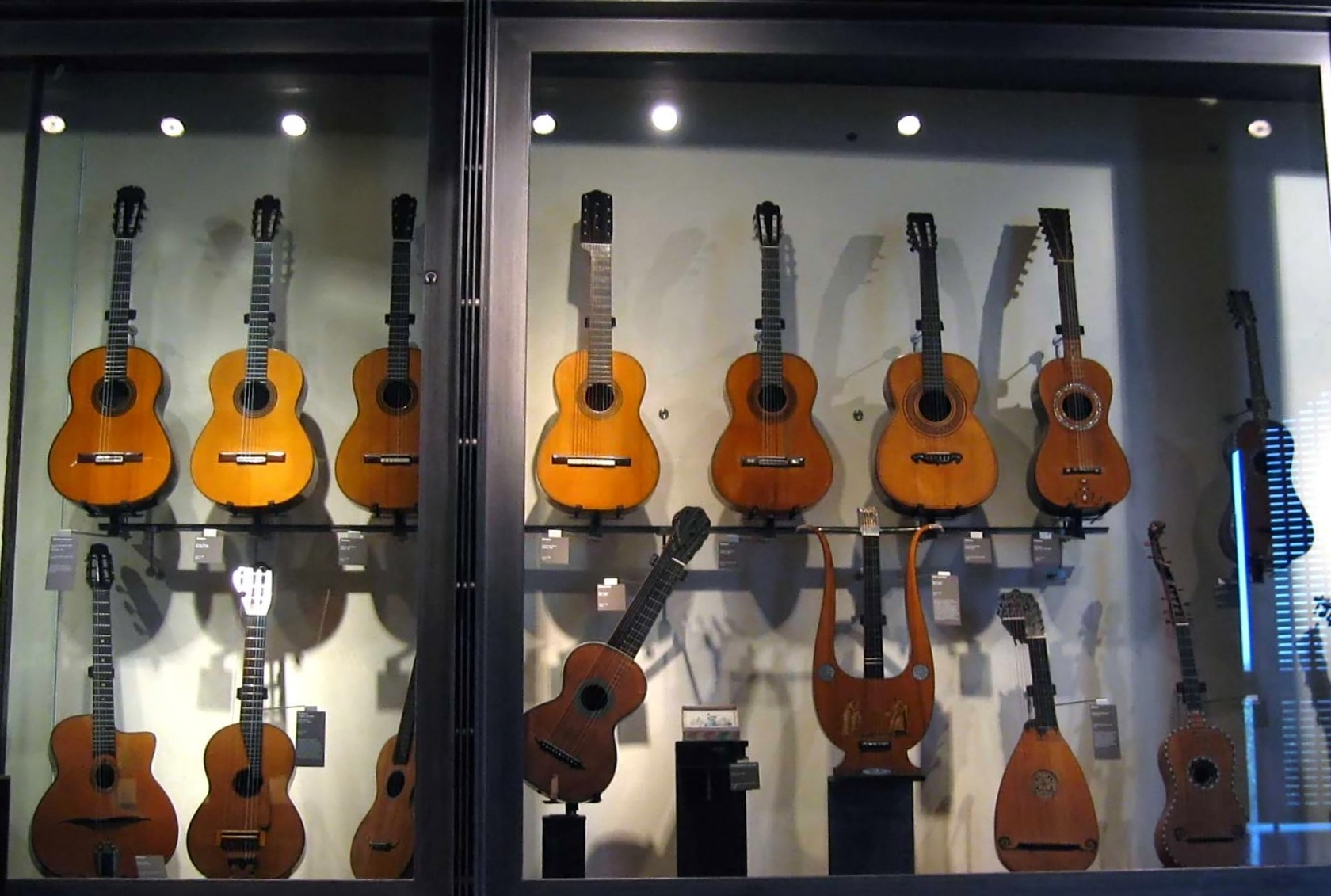
19th and 20th century guitars and by Antonio de Torres

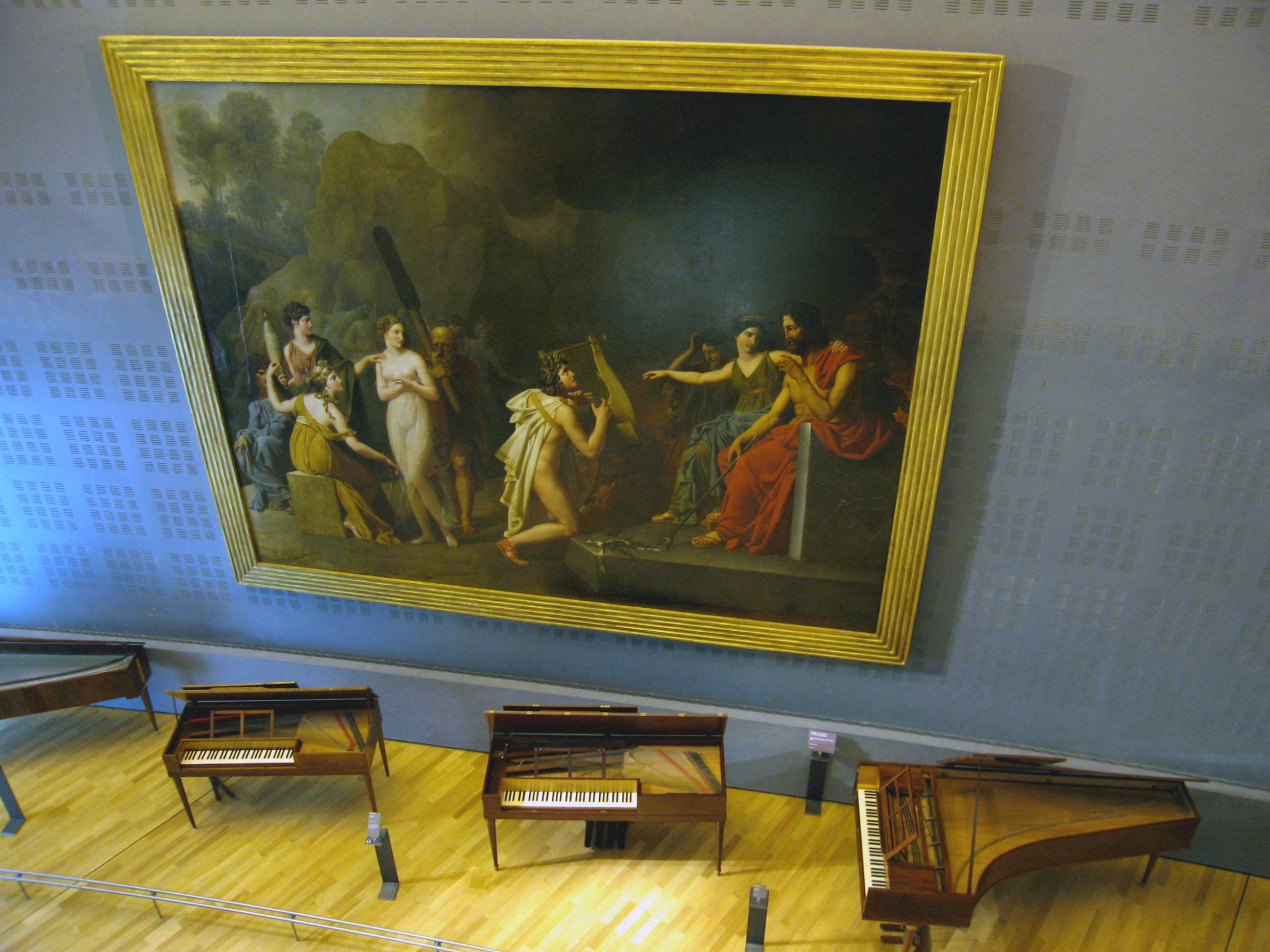
Pianos from the beginning of the 19th century

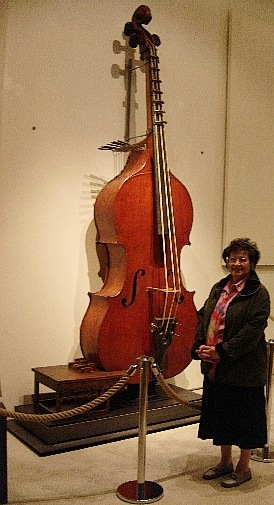
Octobasse by Jean-Baptiste Vuillaume, 19th century

== See also ==
- List of music museums
- Cité des Sciences et de l'Industrie, in Parc de la Villette
- La Géode, an IMAX domed theatre in Parc de la Villette
- Le Zénith, a concert arena in Parc de la Villette
