= Cité des Sciences et de l'Industrie =

Coordinates: 48°53′44″N 2°23′17″E

City of Science and Industry
- Cité des Sciences et de l'Industrie (la CSI)

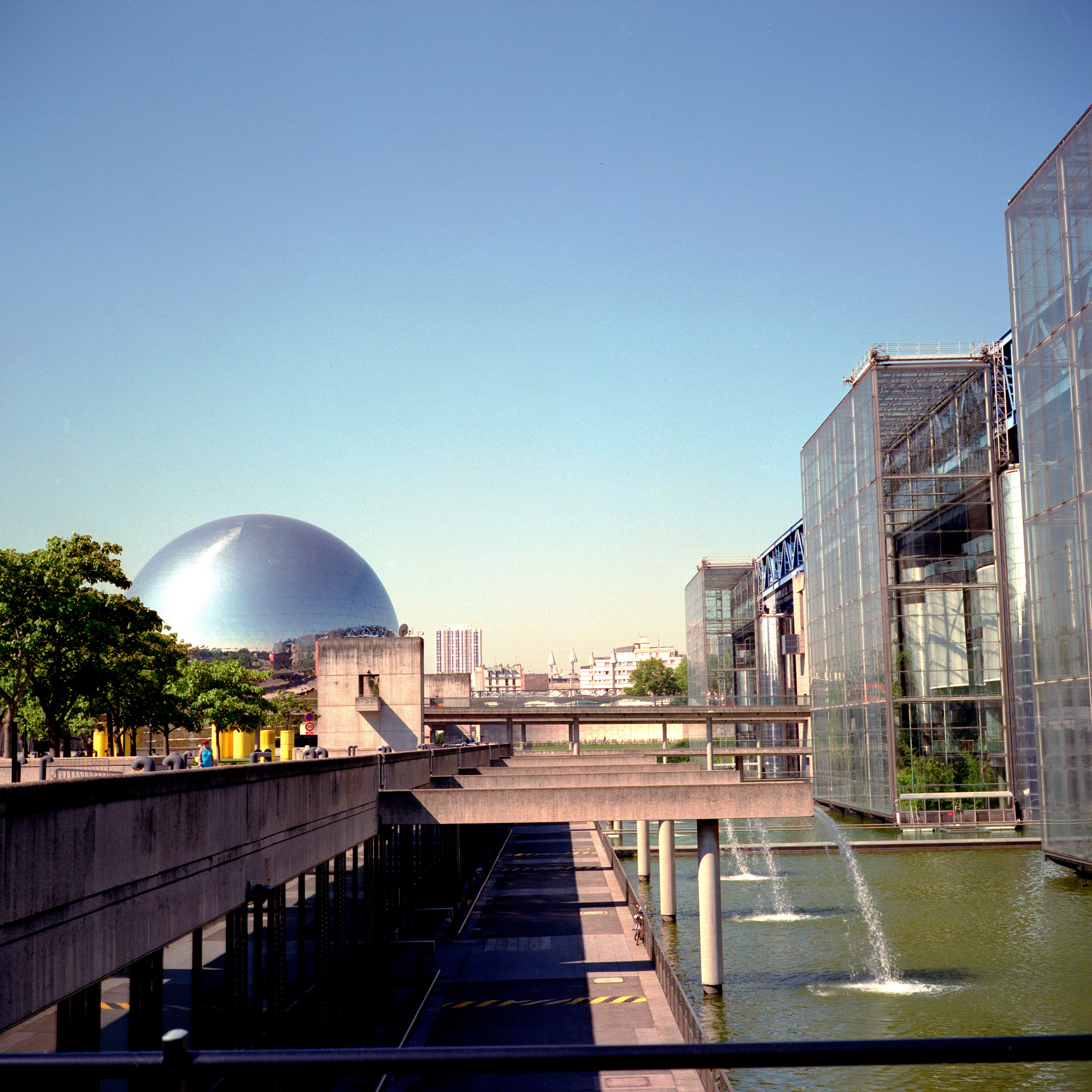
- La Cité des Sciences
- Established: 13 March 1986
- Location: Parc de la Villette, Paris, France
- Type: Science museum
- Visitors: 1,992,823 (2022)
- Director: Claudie Haigneré
- Public transit access: Porte de la Villette
- Website: www.cite-sciences.fr/en/

The Cité des Sciences et de l'Industrie (French pronunciation: [site de sjɑ̃s e də lɛ̃dystʁi], "City of Science and Industry", abbreviated la CSI) or simply CSI is a large science museum in Europe. Located in the Parc de la Villette in Paris, France, it is one of the three dozen French Cultural Centers of Science, Technology and Industry (CCSTI), promoting science and science culture.

About five million people visit the Cité each year. Attractions include a planetarium, a submarine (the Argonaute), an aquarium, an IMAX theatre (La Géode) and special areas for children and teenagers. The CSI is classified as a public establishment of an industrial and commercial character, an establishment specialising in the fostering of scientific and technical culture. Created on the initiative of President Giscard d'Estaing, the goal of the Cité is to spread scientific and technical knowledge among the public, particularly for youth, and to promote public interest in science, research and industry.

The most notable features of the "bioclimatic façade" facing the park are Les Serres – three greenhouse spaces each 32 metres high, 32 metres wide and 8 metres deep. The facades of Les Serres were the first structural glass walls to be constructed without framing or supporting fins. Between 30 May, and 1 June 2008, the museum hosted the 3rd International Salon for Peace Initiatives.

In 2009, the Cité des Sciences and the Palais de la Découverte were brought together in a common establishment, named Universcience, with EPIC status.

== Features ==
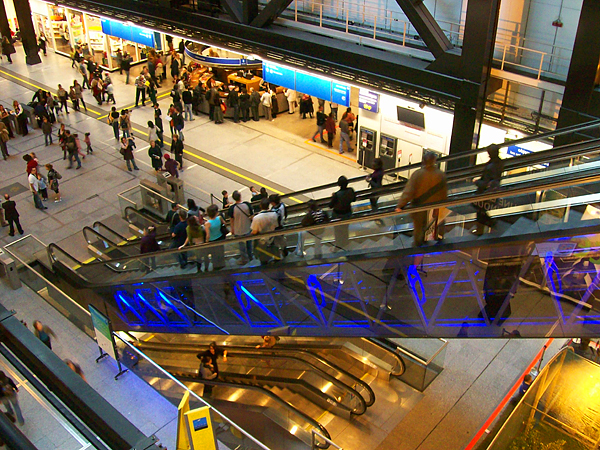
La Cité des Sciences main hall escalator

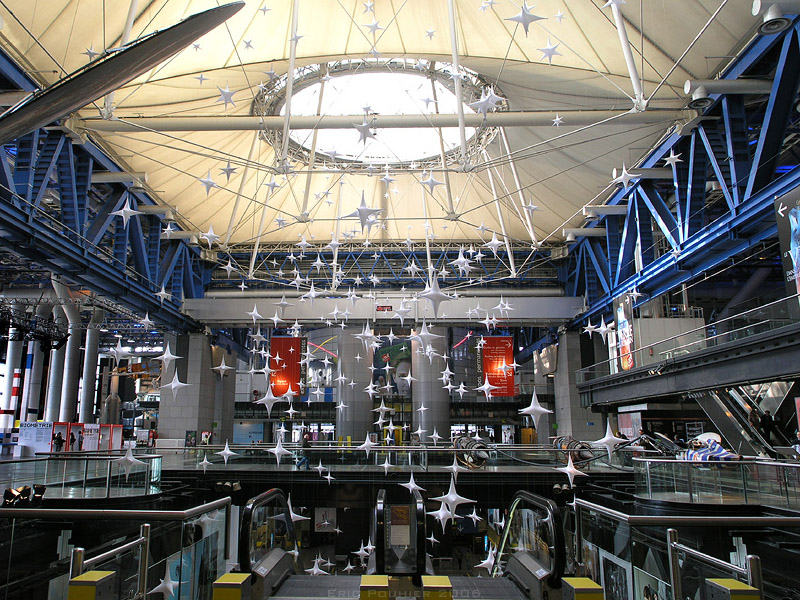
Museum interior

- Explore (levels 1, 2, and 3)
- The library of science and industry (Médiathèque, level −1)
- City of children (level 0)
- Auditorium and things (level 0)
- Louis Lumière theatre (level 0)
- Planetarium (located between exhibits on level 2)
- Numeric crossroads (level −1)
- City of careers (level −1)
- City of health (level −1)
- Meeting place (level −1)
- Aquarium (level −2)
- Jean bertin hall (level 0)
- Condorcet hall (level 0)
- Picnic area (level 0)
- Post office (level 0)
- Store for scientific books and toys (level 0)
- Restaurants (level −2)
- Argonaute museum ship
- Solar Impulse 1

== History ==
The building is constructed around the vast steel trusses of an abattoir sales hall on which construction had halted in 1973. The transformation, commissioned on 15 September 1980, was designed by the architect Adrien Fainsilber and the engineering firm Rice Francis Ritchie (RFR Engineers). It was opened on 13 March 1986, inaugurated by François Mitterrand upon the occasion of the encounter of the Giotto space probe with Halley's Comet.

== Floor directory ==
	Exhibitions	Shows	Resources	Facilities
Level 2	Two permanent + two temporary exhibitions Activity points	Planetarium		Snack bar
Level 1	Six permanent + two temporary exhibitions Greenhouse; Activity points			Snack bar
Level 0	Cité des Enfants, 2–7-year-olds Cité des Enfants, 5–12-year-olds Shadows and light Argonaute submarine	Louis-Lumière cinema Cinaxe cinema	Library (BSI) – children's section Auditorium	Information desk, ticket desk Café, Shop; Post office Cloakroom; Cash machine
Level −1			Multimedia Library (BSI); Vocal guidance Health Information; Digital Forum	La Villette Conference Centre; Group Cloakroom
Level −2		Géode	Aquarium	Restaurant; Cafeteria; Café; Car Parks

== Access ==
It is accessible by Métro Line 7 at the Porte de la Villette station and by bus lines 60, 71, 75, 139, 150, 151, 152 and 170. The tramway T3b was opened in December 2012.

== See also ==
- Cité de la musique, City of Music
- La Géode, an IMAX domed theatre
- List of museums in Paris
- Le Zénith, a concert arena in Parc de la Villette
- Parc de la Villette
- List of tourist attractions in Paris
