= Etai Yamada =

Japanese buddhist

- Born: December 1, 1895; Shiga Prefecture, Japan
- Died: February 22, 1994 (aged 98)
- Known for: 253rd head priest of the Japanese Tendai school of Mahayana Buddhism

The Most Venerable Etai Yamada (山田 恵諦, Yamada Etai; 1 December 1895– 22 February 1994) was the 253rd head priest of the Japanese Tendai school of Mahayana Buddhism.

In 1986, Yamada was invited by Pope John Paul II to be one of the few non-Christian religious leaders to attend the World Day of Prayer for Peace in Assisi, Italy. In 1987, he held a religious summit meeting on Mount Hiei near Kyoto. This event has been held annually to the present day, inviting religious leaders to gather to pray for worldwide peace and reconciliation.

Yamada conducted ecumenical dialogues with religious leaders around the world based on his interpretation of the Lotus Sutra which culminated in a 1987 summit. He also used the Lotus Sutra to move his sect from a "temple Buddhism" perspective to one based on social engagement.

Yamada received the Niwano Peace Prize in 1989, to date he is the only Japanese recipient of the award.
