= Qian Tang =

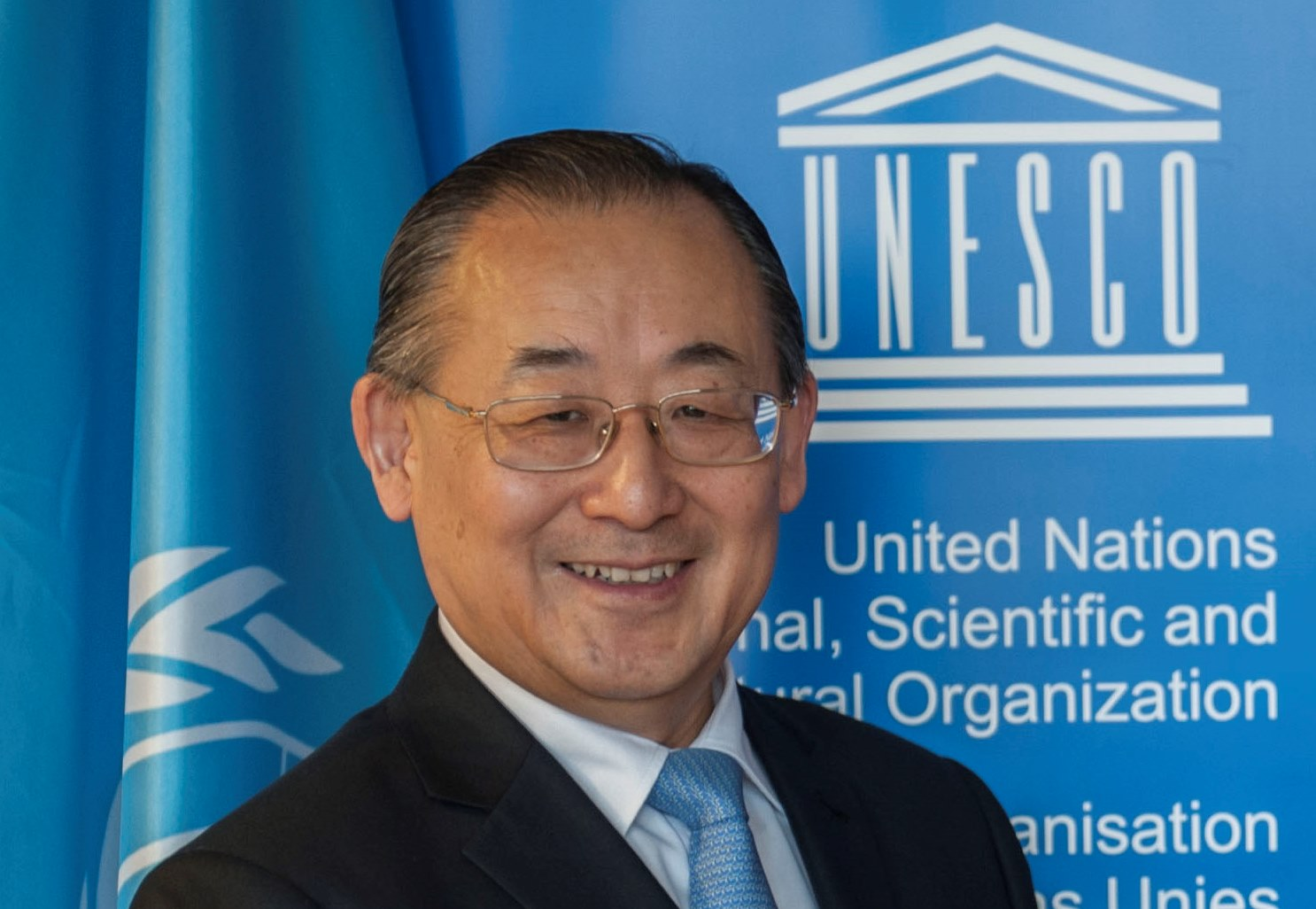

Assistant Director-General of Education of UNESCO
- Incumbent
- Assumed office April 2010

Personal details
- Education: University of Windsor Shanxi University
- Website: Official biography

Qian Tang (born 8 December 1950) has been the Assistant Director-General for Education at UNESCO since April 2010.

== Early life and education ==
Qian Tang was born on 8 December 1950 in Beijing, China. He holds a PhD in biology and a master's degree in human kinetics from the University of Windsor, Canada as well as a bachelor's degree in education from Shanxi University, Taiyuan, China. After China started implementing reforms in the 1970s, he was among the first students the government sent to study abroad.

== Career ==
=== Teaching ===
Qian Tang started his career in the mid-1970s as a secondary school teacher in Shanxi Province, China. He is the author of many publications and articles in education.

=== Chinese Government ===
In 1985, he was posted to the Chinese Embassy in Ottawa, Canada, where he served until 1989 as First Secretary, responsible for promoting academic cooperation between Canadian and Chinese universities.

From 1992 to 1993, he was Deputy Director-General in the Bureau of Science and Technology of the Shanxi Provincial Government in Xi’an. He also served at the Chinese Ministry of Education's Department of Vocational and Technical Education in Beijing, first as Director of the Division on Policy, Planning and Cooperation (1989-1991) and later as the Assistant Director-General of the Department (1991-1992). He was instrumental in formulating and implementing China's national policy on the development of technical vocational education.

=== UNESCO ===
Qian Tang started his career at UNESCO in 1993 as Senior Programme Specialist and later Chief for Technical and Vocational Education, where he contributed to the creation of the UNESCO-UNEVOC International Centre in Bonn, Germany and also led preparations on the Second International Congress on Technical and Vocational Education in Seoul, Republic of Korea, serving as its Secretary-General. He then occupied a number of senior positions in the Education Sector.

He steered efforts on the global Education for All initiative, which ran from 2000 to 2015, focusing on the provision of quality basic education for children, youth and adults.

Since 2010, Qian Tang is Assistant Director-General for Education at UNESCO. He heads UNESCO's Education Sector, which includes around 400 staff at the headquarters, field offices and the seven education Institutes.

Under his leadership, the Education Sector spearheaded the formulation of the Education 2030 agenda, encapsulated in Sustainable Development Goal 4 (SDG 4), which calls for ensuring inclusive and equitable quality education and promoting lifelong learning opportunities for all. UNESCO is coordinating and monitoring its implementation at the global and regional levels, as entrusted by the Incheon Declaration adopted at the World Education Forum in 2015.

In the course of his term, Qian Tang had assumed parallel duties. From September 2015 to July 2016, he was Officer-in-Charge of the Bureau of Strategic Planning, having led the presentation of UNESCO's Programme and Budget document (38C/5) at the 38th session of General Conference. From November 2016 to March 2017, he was Director ad interim of the Human Resources Management bureau, driving forward the revisions of human resources policies to improve the Organization's management.

=== UNESCO Director-General candidacy ===
In March 2017, Qian Tang was officially nominated as China's candidate for the post of Director-General of UNESCO. Elections for the post will take place during UNESCO's General Conference, to be held from 30 October to 14 November 2017.

== Personal life ==
Qian Tang is married and has a daughter.
