= Hildegard Goss-Mayr =

Austrian Catholic nonviolent activist (born 1930)

Hildegard Goss-Mayr (born 22 January 1930, Vienna) is an Austrian nonviolent activist and Catholic theologian.

== Life and commitment ==
Daughter of Kaspar Mayr, founder of the Austrian branch of the International Fellowship of Reconciliation, she studied Philosophy in Vienna and New Haven. Hildegard was the first woman to graduate from the University of Vienna. In 1953, Hildegard started working in the International Community for Reconciliation or IFOR. In 1958, she married Jean Goss (1912–1991), a French peace activist; the couple had two children, Myriam and Etienne.

She and her husband were in Rome during the Council Vatican II lobbying for the recognition of the conscientious objection by the Roman Catholic Church. She also, together with her husband, stood for disarmament and non-violence. In the 1960s/70s, they lived and worked for some time in South America, training groups in active nonviolence and helping in the creation of the SERPAJ, Service for Peace and Justice, whose first coordinator was Adolfo Pérez Esquivel. They trained others groups in active nonviolence in many countries, in Europe, Asia, Middle East and Africa. They participated in the preparation of the People Power Revolution in Philippines in 1986.

Jean Goss and Hildegard Goss-Mayr shared several Peace Prizes, included the Bruno Kreisky Award in Austria in 1979, the Pax Christi USA Pope Paul VI Teacher of Peace Award in 1986, and the Pfeffer Peace Prize in 1990.

In 1991, Goss-Mayr has also won the Niwano Peace Prize, in Japan, Spanish Peace Prize and, in 2009, the Pacem in Terris Peace and Freedom Award, from the Diocese of Davenport, Iowa. She is currently the honorary president of the International Fellowship of Reconciliation.

She was nominated for the Nobel Peace Prize in 1979, in 1987 and in 2005 among the « 1000 women for the Nobel Peace Prize 2005 » by PeaceWomen Across the Globe.

== Bibliography ==
- Une autre révolution. Violence des non-violents, Paris, Cerf, 1969.
- Der Mensch vor dem Unrecht. Spiritualität und Praxis. Gewaltlose Befreiung, Vienna, 1976.
- Gérard Houver, A Non-Violent Lifestyle, Conversations with Jean and Hildegard Goss, London: Marshall Morgan and Scott Lamp Press 1981. (Translation by Richard Bateman of Houver's: Jean et Hildegard Goss-Mayr, La non-violence, c'est la vie, Arudis, Utovie, 1986.
- Évangile et luttes de paix, Paris, Bergers et Mages, 1989.
- Friede braucht Bewegung. Analysen und Perspektiven der Friedensbewegung in Österreich, with Thomas Roithner and Pete Hämmerle.
- Oser le combat non-violent aux côtés de Jean Goss, Paris, Cerf, 1998, preface by cardinal Franz König.
- With Jo Hanssens, Jean Goss. Mystique et militant de la non-violence, Namur, Fidélité, 2010, preface by Adolfo Pérez Esquivel.

== Biography ==
- Richard Deats, Marked for life. The story of Hildegard Goss-Mayr, Hyde Park (NY), New City Press, 2009.

== See also ==
- List of peace activists
