= Cabasse (company) =

French audio equipment manufacturer

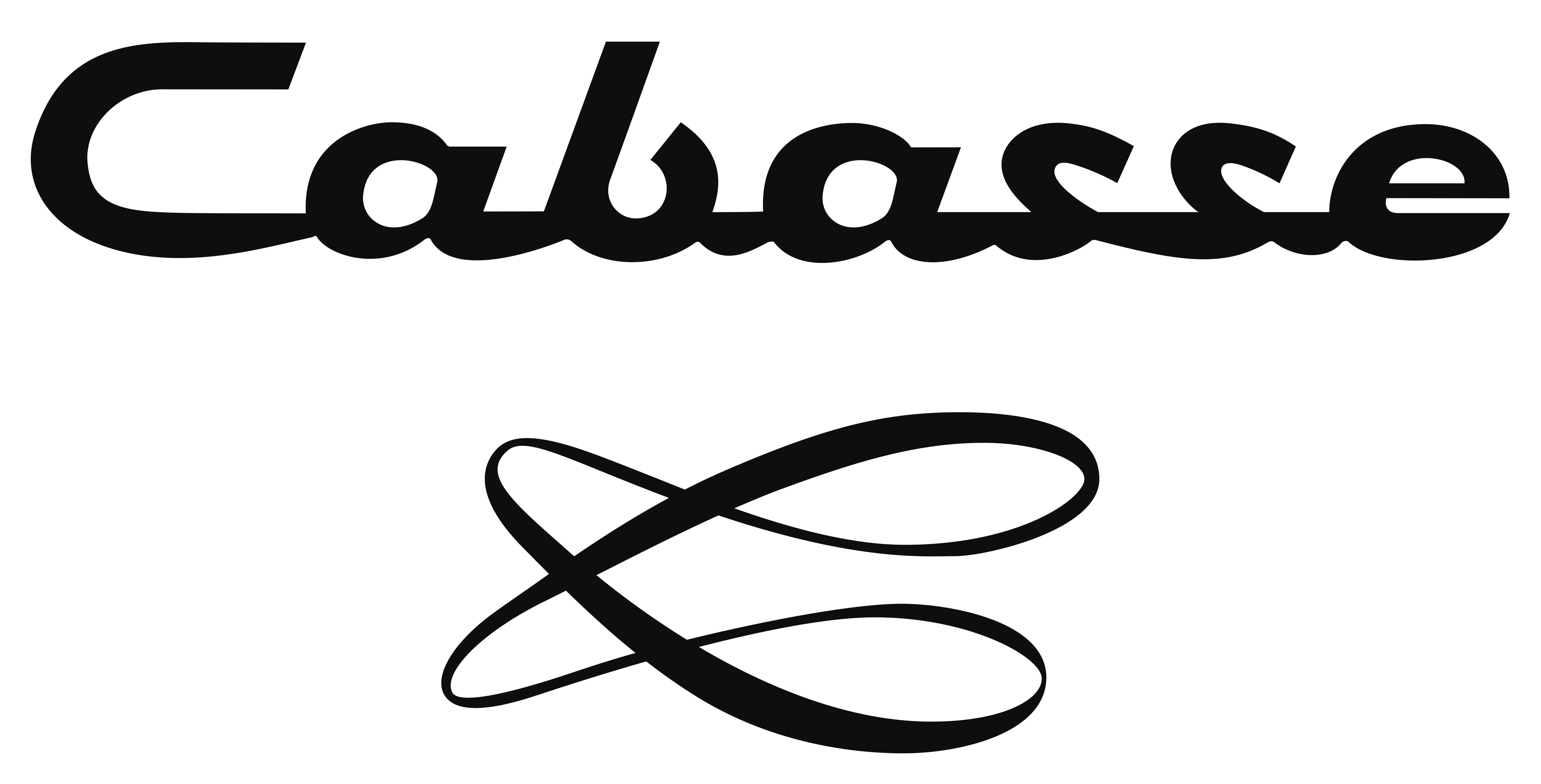
- Company type: Private
- Traded as: Euronext Growth
- Industry: Consumer electronics
- Founded: 1950
- Headquarters: Plouzané, France
- Key people: Georges Cabasse, founder
- Products: Loudspeakers
- Website: www.cabasse.com

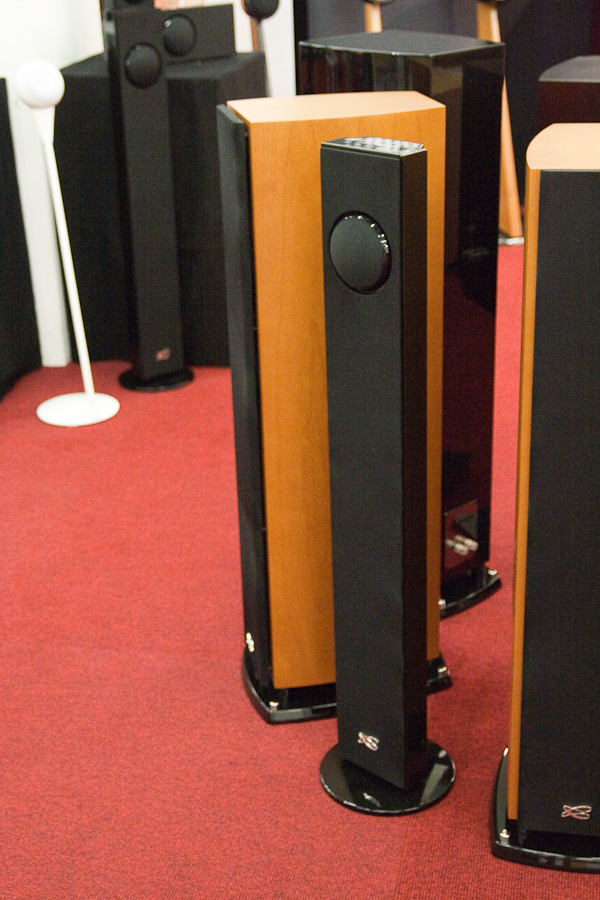
Cabasse floor standing speakers at trade fair High End 2009 in Munich

Cabasse is a French audio manufacturer founded by Georges Cabasse (1928-2019) in 1950. It is mainly known for its home loudspeakers but has also produced professional audio speakers for studio recording or sound reinforcement in theatres and power amplifiers. The company is now part of a larger group called Veom Group.

== Important dates ==
- 1950 : Foundation.
- 1952 : First 2-way coaxial speakers for Cinemascope movie theatres like Le Grand Rex in Paris.
- 1958 : First active loudspeakers systems with valve amplifiers and filters.
- 1965 : Underwater loudspeakers for the French Navy.
- 1974 : Dome tweeters and midranges, servo-controlled active Hi-Fi and monitor loudspeakers (used by Radio France).
- 1983 : Honeycomb dome membranes for Hi-Fi and Public Address systems, from 7" to 22".
- 1984 : Carbo high-efficiency units for the 4 way clusters fitting the 12-channel system at the Omnimax theatre La Géode in Parc de la Villette, Paris.
- 1985 : Duocell membranes based on an exclusive processing of Rohacell foam.
- 1992 : The SCS principle (Spatially Coherent System) launched with the Atlantis reference system (4 channel and 5 speakers : 2 woofers and a 3 way coaxial speaker called TC21 that goes from 200 Hz to 20 kHz).
- 1998 : Fitting of the Charles de Gaulle aircraft carrier with specific 117 dB efficiency horn systems.
- 2002 : The TC22 reference 3 way coaxial unit, that goes from 80 Hz to 20 kHz.
- 2006 : La Sphere, a 4 way coaxial unit is launched.
- 2006 : Cabasse is bought by Canon Europe and was led by Kazuhiro Otsubo, president of the Canon factory in Brittany.
- 2014 : Start up group Awox buys Cabasse from Canon.
- 2020 : Awox sold Awox Lighting and created changed the group name from AwoX Group to Cabasse Group.
- 2022 : Cabasse Group change its name to Veom Group.

== Notable products and technologies ==
Cabasse is one of the oldest loudspeakers manufacturer in France, and is known for its involvement in research, its high standard of quality, and the names of their products that used to be related to sea (especially boat names like clipper, sampan, ketch, sloop...)

In the eighties their reputation came from their professional active speakers (often used by recording studios) and the honeycomb membranes that allowed high power with low distortion. These membranes were used by the very small Galiote (home hi-fi) and the huge Saturn, a subwoofer for theatres, fitted with a 22 inches unit. They also used to perform astounding comparisons between live sound and speakers sound and therefore focused their goals on high dynamics (for real sound pressure levels), high efficiency and low distortion levels.

In 1986 La Géode was inaugurated, and it remains the only 12-channel Omnimax in the world. For special low frequency effects, 4 giant subwoofers (100 cubic feet for 2000 lb) fitted with 2 x 22 inches honeycomb membranes complement this 12.6 system.

In the nineties, Cabasse started to work on coaxial units in order to reduce directivity through spherical wavefront. This is their Spatially Coherent System principle. It was implemented through the TC21, a 3-way coaxial unit whose bandwidth goes from 200 Hz to 20 kHz with a 30° off-axis response very close to the on-axis response.

At the beginning of 2006 they unveiled a high-end 4-way unit and presented the theoric approach in a paper at the Audio Engineering Society. This system, released in 2007, is called La Sphère and consists of two spheric coaxial speakers, a filter and four power amplifiers.

In November 2016 Stream BAR, a high-resolution home theater sound bar was launched.

October 2017 saw the launch of a new high-end floorstanding speaker known as Murano Alto. This particular speaker is assembled in the brand's workshops in Plouzané (NW France in Brittany).

SWELL, Cabasse's first nomadic Bluetooth high-fidelity speaker was also released in October 2017.

The Pearl: October 2018 saw the release of The Pearl - a high-resolution active connected speaker with an integrated and patented automatic room correction system (It won the coveted Diapason d'or award in 2020).

The Pearl Akoya was launched in October 2019. It won the Diapason d'or award in 2021 as well as Stereonet's Applause Award in the same year. This second high-resolution active connected speaker with an integrated room correction system is a more compact version than The Pearl.

The Pearl Sub, the first 2.1 active connected subwoofer was introduced into the market in 2020. It brings maximum dynamics, with deep bass, optimized sound for each of its speakers (DEAP technology), room correction and high resolution streaming. It has been optimized for iO/iO2/iO3, Riga/Riga2 and Baltic 4/Baltic 5 speakers.

The 'GEN2' sound optimization was released in February 2021 and made available to owners of The Pearl Collection via the Cabasse StreamControl app. This sound optimization further enhances the acoustics of the two high-resolution active connected speakers The Pearl and The Pearl AKoya.

Throughout the years, the company has developed and renewed its traditional and lifestyle Hi-fi product lines with Surf, Jersey, Antigua, Murano, Eole 4. Voice control for all of Cabasse's Wi-Fi streaming products has been available since 2018 through the Cabasse Assistant via Google Assistant, and Amazon Alexa compatibility was introduced in 2019.
