= Memoria Abierta =

Memória Abierta is an alliance of Argentine human rights organizations that promotes the memory of recent human rights violations, actions of resistance and struggles for truth and justice. It contributes to the promotion of human rights and seeks to promote reflection on the present.

It was created in 1999 and is currently composed of eight human rights organizations: Permanent Assembly for Human Rights, Buena Memoria Civil Association, Center for Legal and Social Studies, Vesubio and Puente 12 Victims' Tribute Commission, Commission for Memory, Truth and Justice of the Northern Zone, Relatives of Disappeared and Arrested for Political Reasons, Historical and Social Memory Foundation of Argentina, Mothers of the Plaza de Mayo - Founding Line and Service Peace and Justice.

== History ==
In 1999, a group of human rights organizations began to meet, seeking to participate in a coordinated way in local and national initiatives in favor of the memory of the last dictatorship in Argentina. The main objective was to contribute to the elaboration of the memory of what happened during State terrorism and to the construction of a later democracy to strengthen and promote respect for human rights. The participating organizations came together with the conviction that a joint action would make them stronger in their struggle.

The initial work of Memoria Abierta included actions aimed at founding a Memory Museum, an extensive program of archival treatment of historical-institutional documents of human rights organizations and the construction of an Oral Archive of testimonies in film format on State terrorism. Later on were added works towards the task of systematization of photographs in a Photographic Archive and the production resources for the visualization of spaces of repression and resistance and their transformation into memory sites.

Memoria Abierta participated in the founding of the International Coalition of Sites of Conscience. In this space, coordinates the Latin American and Caribbean Network of Sites of Memory promoting the development of initiatives that stimulate reflection on human rights violations committed in these countries and their consequences in the present.

== Archives ==
Memoria Abierta implements a documentary treatment program. In this framework, it established common guidelines and standards for the cataloging and standardization of the different archives it gathers (documentaries, photographic, audiovisual). It applies international standards of description and a specialized Thesauri on Human Rights.

The Oral Archive of Memoria Abierta produces and gives access to testimonies related to the period of State terrorism, to the social and political life of the 1960s and 1970s and to the different actions promoted by human rights organizations and civil society in the search for truth and justice. It is composed of interviews to people whose lives have been affected in various ways by state terrorism. These testimonies are ordered, cataloged and arranged for public consultation in order to facilitate the study and interpretation of Argentine recent past from the point of view of the actors involved.

The Memoria Abierta archives were included in the "Memory of the World" Register of the UNESCO as part of the "Documentary Heritage on Human Rights in Argentina for the period 1976-1983. Archives for Truth, Memory and Justice in the face of State terrorism".

== Sites ==
It produces tools that make "visible" the sites used by repression. Identifies together with local counterparts, Clandestine Detention Centers in the Argentine territory and collaborates in the recovery processes of these places to turn them into memory sites.

Memoria Abierta elaborates different types of resources that are regularly incorporated into the processes of judging the crimes of the dictatorship since the mid-2000s, at the request of the investigating magistrates or courts that are involved in oral and public trials in different parts of the country. Memoria Abierta also participate in judicial investigations through expert reports, archival advice and the supply of documentation requested by the courts

== International Work ==
Memoria Abierta works in partnership to rebuild social trust and promote cooperation within civil society and with state entities in a process of strengthening democratic institutions. It maintains different links and develops projects and activities with different organizations with the objective of exchanging and sharing their experience and work methodologies, as well as the characteristics of the Argentine process of truth and justice with other transitional processes of the world.

In this context, it shares strategies, lessons learned and specific methodologies related to the organization and preservation of archives (including oral archives), to topographic research with different sites within Argentina, in the region and in different countries of the world. ,

The institutions that make up the Latin American and Caribbean Network, which Memoria Abierta has been coordinating since 2006, are working to recover and construct collective reports on the serious violations of human rights and resistance in the region during the recent past, in periods of State terrorism, internal armed conflict and high levels of impunity, with the aim of promoting democracy and guarantees of non-repetition. The Latin American and Caribbean Network of Memory Sites develops projects, initiatives, joint trainings that seek to strengthen the integration between institutions with similar perspectives.
