= International Fellowship of Reconciliation =

Non-governmental human rights organization

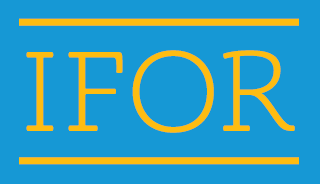
- Founded: 1914
- Type: Non-profit; NGO
- Location: International Secretariat, Obrechtstraat, Utrecht, The Netherlands
- Fields: Disarmament - with one focus on nuclear weapons, work against racism, work for gender equality, interfaith, campaigns, Ecosoc status with UN and representatives at UN in New York, Geneva and Vienna and at UNESCO in Paris.
- Members: Over 70 members all over the world
- Key people: Lotta Sjöström Becker - President Blas García Noriega - Vice president Peter Cousins - Vice president
- Website: www.ifor.org

The International Fellowship of Reconciliation (IFOR) is a non-governmental organization founded in 1914 in response to the horrors of war in Europe. Today IFOR counts 71 branches, groups and affiliates in 48 countries on all continents. IFOR members promote nonviolence, human rights and reconciliation through public education efforts, training programs and campaigns. The IFOR International Secretariat in Utrecht, Netherlands facilitates communication among IFOR members, links branches to capacity building resources, provides training in gender-sensitive nonviolence through the Women Peacemakers Program, and helps coordinate international campaigns, delegations and urgent actions. IFOR has ECOSOC status at the United Nations.

== History ==
=== Origins in wartime ===
The first body to use the name "Fellowship of Reconciliation" was formed as a result of a pact made in August 1914 at the outbreak of the First World War by two Christians, Henry Hodgkin (an English Quaker) and Friedrich Siegmund-Schultze (a German Lutheran), who were participating in a Christian pacifist conference in Konstanz, southern Germany (near Switzerland), where the World Alliance for promoting international Friendship through the Churches (World Alliance, WA) was formed. According to the mythology of the IFOR, on the platform of the railway station at Cologne, they pledged to each other that, "We are one in Christ and can never be at war".

After returning to his home country, Hodgkins invited his Quaker – and often socialist – friends, such as Kees Boeke, to organize a conference in Cambridge in 1915, in which the "Fellowship of Reconciliation" (FOR England) was established. The German branch, Versöhnungsbund, was founded later. It held its first conference in 1932, but in 1933, when Hitler came to power, it dissolved. Schultze was arrested 27 times during World War I and was forced to live in exile during the Nazi period. FOR Germany was officially reestablished in 1956 with Dr Siegmund Schultze as president. Shortly after the Cambridge conference, in the autumn of 1915, Henry Hodgkin went to America and, on 11 and 12 November, the American Fellowship was founded during a Conference at Garden City, Long Island. More than a thousand members enrolled in the American Fellowship before and during the war, which, for the US, began on 6 April 1917. Also, Cornelius Boeke made a trip to Europe, where he established international social networks for the work of FOR. Because of this and his peace work, he was deported to his home country, Holland, by the national court of England.

During the First World War, the Fellowship of Reconciliation focused its activities mainly on trying to influence public opinion, to help victims of war and war prisoners. 600 people in England went to prison for helping more than 16,000 imprisoned during the war. When conscription began in Britain in 1916 and in the United States many FOR members refused military service. Many FOR members were accused of being pro-German because of their peace endeavours and this even led to physical assaults of the members of FOR.

=== After World War One: strengthening the international movement ===
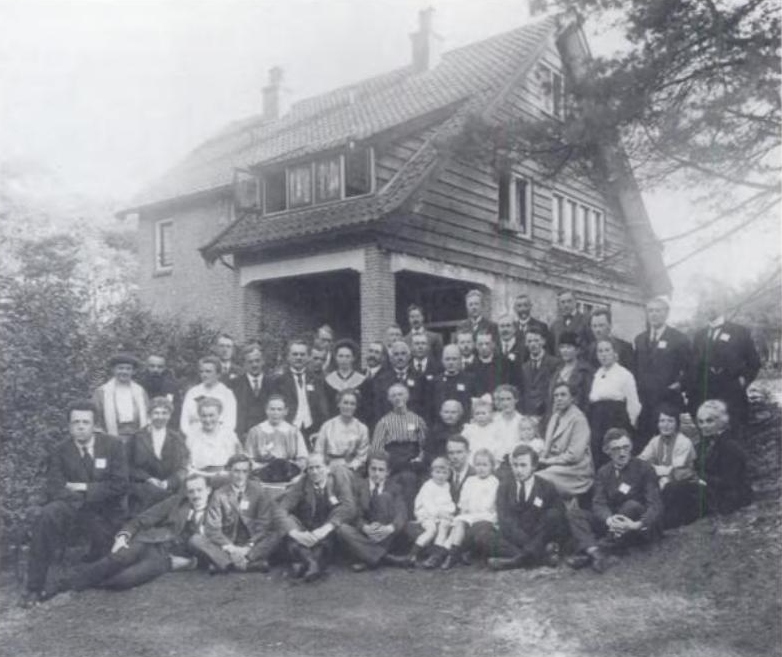
First international gathering of International Fellowship of Reconciliation at Bilthoven, Netherlands, in 1919

After the end of war, in 1919, the deported Kees Boeke and Henry Hodgkin met in Holland, where they decided to organize the first international conference, which led to the formation of "Movement towards a Christian international" (Christian international), which later became the "International Fellowship of Reconciliation." The conference was held in Boeke's house in the town of Bilthoven where 50 pacifists from ten different countries met. Many of the pacifists came straight to Bilthoven from the conference of World Alliance organized in Haag the day before. In relation to the Peace Movement of World Alliance, the conferees wanted to establish an organization that had its basis more in Christian socialism. Through their work they wanted to oppose the revolutionary ideas of the Communist International and offer a better solution for social justice. In their first declaration, the conferees said that they wanted to follow the revolutionary ideals of Christ in order to achieve a Christian revolution that is based on love and nonviolence.

The first headquarters of the Christian international was in Holland. Later, in 1923, the headquarters were moved to England, when the movement's name was transformed to IFOR. This International Fellowship of Reconciliation became an umbrella organisation to which national branches of Fellowship of Reconciliation affiliated themselves as members.

The first secretary of IFOR was the Swiss pacifist Pierre Cérésole jailed several times for his peace witness. He established the Service Civil (International Voluntary Service for Peace), initially organizing work camps in areas torn apart by war, with volunteers from former enemy countries. Relief for the victims of war was carried out, and international conferences and meetings spread the work of peace to many other parts of the globe. Immediately after the Bilthoven meeting, IFOR appointed travelling secretaries such as John Nevin Sayre, André Trocmé, Muriel Lester, Henri Rose and Percy Bartlett. They travelled carrying the Fellowship's messages around Europe, in Scandinavia, Central Europe, Poland, the Baltic States and the Balkans, giving life to several international conferences that took place between the two world wars. The first one gathered 200 delegates from 20 nations (also India, Burma and Ukraine) in Sonntagberg in Austria. Many others followed and, in such a tense historical moment, IFOR members discussed the necessity of disarmament and of a new role of Churches, asking clergymen to make a strong stand against the idea of "righteous wars". In 1932, the IFOR led a Youth Crusade across Europe in support of the Geneva World Disarmament Conference. Protestants and Catholics from all over converged on Geneva by various routes, reaching over 50,000 people and presenting to the Conference a petition calling for total disarmament among the nations.

=== Ambassadors of Reconciliation ===
At the end of the 1930s, given the unstable international situation, IFOR established Embassies of Reconciliation that initiated peace efforts not only in Europe but in Japan and China as well. "Ambassadors of Reconciliation", such as George Lansbury, Muriel Lester and Anne Seesholtz, visited many world leaders, including Adolf Hitler, Benito Mussolini, Leon Blum and Franklin D Roosevelt. Muriel Lester, an English social worker, served as IFOR travelling secretary throughout the world, helping to establish its work in many countries. She met Mahatma Gandhi, first in London when, in 1931, he spent some time at Kingsley Hall, a community center with educational, social and recreational purposes, run by her and her sister Doris, and then in India when she went with him in Bihar on his anti-untouchability tour during 1934. When World War II broke out, travel and communications became almost impossible. In many countries IFOR members suffered persecution for publicly preaching pacifism. IFOR's members, especially in America tried by inter-church mediation to find ways of ending the war, to help conscientious objectors, and struggled against internment of Japanese Americans. In France, IFOR members André and Magda Trocmé, with the help of the villagers of le Chambon sur Lignon, saved the lives of thousands of Jews escaping the Holocaust. In Belgium. Feminist Magda Yoors Peeters defended Jewish refugees and conscientious objectors.

=== Supporting nonviolent movements around the world ===
After the war, travelling secretaries continued their work. IFOR branches and affiliates in Latin America, Asia, Africa, and the Middle East grew consistently also thanks to the work of Jean Goss and Hildegard Goss-Mayr from Paris and Vienna, three times nominated for the Nobel Peace Prize. New Zealand pacifist Ormond Burton represented the IFOR in that nation. From such labors arose Servicio Paz y Justicia (SERPAJ) throughout Latin America. SERPAJ's founder Adolfo Perez Esquivel from Argentina was awarded the Nobel Peace Prize in 1980. SERPAJ participated in the nonviolent resistance to Chile's 16-year-long military dictatorship, which culminated in free elections that restored democracy. Hildegard Goss-Mayrs' training in active nonviolence contributed significantly to the people power overthrow of the Ferdinand Marcos dictatorship in the Philippines in 1986, as well as the growth of nonviolent movements in Asia and Africa. The Goss-Mayrs, IFOR Honorary Presidents, were central to the global spread of active nonviolence movement.

== Members ==
IFOR has 71 member organizations in 48 countries in all continents.

== How IFOR works ==
=== Decade for a Culture of Nonviolence ===
Since the initiation of the United Nations Decade for a Culture of Peace and Nonviolence for the Children of the World, in 2001, IFOR members have been active in working for peace education and in working to establish national coalitions to support the Decade.

=== Nonviolence education and training ===
IFOR assists groups and individuals to find ways in which they can transform conflicts into positive and growth oriented interactions that involve dialogue and lead to reconciliation. The Nonviolent Education Program aims at supporting sustainable implementation of nonviolence/nonviolent education, peace education and violence prevention in compulsory kindergarten and school education and thus consequent implementation of Children's Rights expressed in the Convention on the Rights of the Child. This is done through various presentations and training programs, as well as through the creation of resource materials and contact with trainers and resource people.

=== Youth empowerment ===
Thanks to the Youth Working Group, IFOR provides young people with the skills and opportunities to become active peacemakers. This is done through nonviolence and leadership training, campaigning, and through internships with IFOR branches and groups, or with the International Secretariat.

=== Interfaith cooperation ===
Religion has on occasion played a central role in fomenting conflict but can also be a source of inspiration and leadership for peace. IFOR sponsors interfaith delegations to areas of conflict and publishes material on nonviolence from different religious traditions.

=== Disarmament ===
Since its founding, IFOR has opposed war and preparations for war. IFOR members support conscientious objectors, campaign for a ban on land mines, and oppose nuclear weapons and all other weapons of mass destruction. During their annual meeting, European members from different branches of the International Fellowship of Reconciliation issued the Declaration of Prali, in occasion of the Global day of Action on Military Spending, 17 April 2012. The Peace and Constitution Committee Working Group promotes actions to raise awareness on the article 9 of the Japanese Constitution which denounces war and war-preparation activities.

=== Gender justice ===
In 2006 IFOR adopted a Gender Policy in which IFOR recognizes that there is a continuum of violence against women that must be confronted, from family violence in the private sphere to armed conflict in the public sphere. Unequal power relations between women and men are one root of violence, conflict and militarization, where women are often severely abused. Gender justice means that women and men can equally contribute to and benefit from peace building, non-violent conflict resolution and reconciliation. This gender policy recognizes that gender equality is an integral part of IFOR's fundamental values and is a core spiritual value. A transformation of the power relations between women and men is a prerequisite for a culture of peace and non-violence, and must be promoted throughout IFOR. The Women Peacemaker Program (WPP) is an IFOR program that works to ensure the possibility for women's access to peace negotiations and promotes the application of IFOR's Gender Policy.

The successful program has been institutionalized by the end of 2012.

== International representation ==
IFOR maintains permanent representatives at the United Nations (UN) in New York, Geneva, Vienna and Paris (UNESCO) who regularly participate in conferences and meetings of UN bodies, providing testimony and expertise from different regional perspectives, promoting non-violent alternatives in the fields of human rights, development, and disarmament. IFOR has observer and consultative status to the United Nations, United Nations Economic and Social Council (ECOSOC) and UNESCO organizations.

== Presidents ==
- Al Hassler
- Diana Francis (1988–1996)
- Marie-Pierre Bovy (1992–1996)
- Akadim Chikandamina (1996–2000)
- Virginia Baron (2000–2002)
- Jonathan Sisson (2002–2006)
- Jan Schacke (2006–2010)
- Hans Ulrich Gerber (2010–2014)
- Davorka Lovrekovic (2014–2018)
- Lotta Sjöström Becker (2018–2022)
- Zoughbi Zoughbi (2022-present)

== Nobel Peace Prizes ==
Six Nobel Peace Prize recipients are members of IFOR:

- Jane Addams (1931)
- Emily Greene Balch (1946)
- Chief Albert Luthuli (1960)
- Martin Luther King Jr. (1964)
- Mairead Corrigan-Maguire (1976)
- Adolfo Pérez Esquivel (1980)

== See also ==
- International Confederation for Disarmament and Peace
- List of anti-war organizations
- List of peace activists
