= Servicio Paz y Justicia =

Latin American human rights organisation

Servicio Paz y Justicia (SERPAJ, Service Peace and Justice) is a Human Rights Non Governmental Organisation in Latin America, founded in 1974. It is a Christian based and nonviolent organization, and is committed for the defense of political prisoners in the different South American dictatorships during the Dirty War in the 1970–80s.

== Affiliations of the SERPAJ ==
The SERPAJ has a consultative status in the United Nations Economic and Social Council and in UNESCO, receiving in 1987 the UNESCO Prize for Peace Education.

It is member of the Ligue internationale pour les droits et la libération des peuples and observer member of the International Coalition for the Decade.

The SERPAJ is also member of the Network Memoria Abierta, created in 1999.

== Personalities of the SERPAJ ==
One of the founders and the first coordinator of the SERPAJ was the 1980 Nobel Peace Prize winner Adolfo Pérez Esquivel.

The Partido Socialista del Uruguay lawyer Azucena Berruti has been a member of the SERPAJ-Uruguay, and minister of Defense of the Tabaré Vázquez government (2005–2008).

== See also ==
- Vicariate of Solidarity (Chile)

== Sources ==
- Philippe MacManus, Gerald Schlabach, Relentless Persistence: Nonviolent Action in Latin America, Eugene (Oregon), Wifp & Stock, 1991, Foreword Leonardo Boff.
- Ronald Pagnuco, John D. McCarthy, « Advocating Direct Nonviolent Action in Latin America: The Antecedents and Emergence of SERPAJ », in Bronislaw Misztal – Anson Shupe [Edit.], Religion and Politics in Comparative Perspective. Revival of Religious Fundamentalism in East and West, Westport (CT), Praeger Pub., 1992, ch. 10, p. 125–149.
- Jeffrey Klaiber, The Church, Dictatorships, and Democracy in Latin America, Orbis Book, 1998 (Reed. Eugene (Oregon), Wifp & Stock, 2007)
