= Niwano Peace Prize =

The Niwano Peace Prize is given to honor and encourage those devoting themselves to interreligious co-operation in the cause of peace and to make their achievements known. Its foundation hopes that the prize will further promote interreligious co-operation for peace and lead to the emergence of more people devoting themselves to this cause.

== Award and nomination process ==
The award is given annually and consists of a certificate, a gold medal, and 20 million yen (roughly US$180,000). The screening committee, which decides the recipients, is made up of religious leaders of international stature. They select the recipient from candidates who are nominated by religious leaders and others of intellectual stature around the world.

== History ==
The Tokyo-based Niwano Peace Foundation was initiated by the Japanese citizen Nikkyō Niwano, founder of the Buddhist lay organization Risshō Kōsei Kai; he was one of the few non-Christian observers of the Second Vatican Council. His son, Nichiko Niwano, is his successor as chairman of the movement, which is dedicated to interreligious dialogue.

== Laureates ==
1983: Dom Hélder Câmara, Brazil
1984: Homer A. Jack, U.S.
1985: Zhao Puchu, China
1986: Philip A. Potter, Dominica
1987: World Muslim Congress, Pakistan
1988: not awarded
1989: Etai Yamada, Japan
1990: Norman Cousins, U.S.
1991: Dr. Hildegard Goss-Mayr, Austria
1992: A. T. Ariyaratne, Sri Lanka
1993: Neve Shalom/Wahat al-Salam, Israel
1994: Cardinal Paulo Evaristo Arns, Archbishop of Sao Paulo, Brazil
1995: M. Aram, India
1996: Marii Hasegawa, U.S.
1997: Corrymeela Community, Northern Ireland
1998: Maha Ghosananda, Cambodia
1999: Community of Sant'Egidio, Italy
2000: Dr. Kang Won Yong, Korea
2001: Elias Chacour, bishop of the Melkite-Catholic Church in Israel
2002: Samuel Ruiz García, Bishop Emeritus of San Cristobal de las Casas, Mexico
2003: Dr. Scilla Elworthy, UK
2004: Acholi Religious Leaders Peace Initiative (ARLPI), Uganda
2005: Dr. Hans Küng, Switzerland
2006: Rabbis for Human Rights, Israel
2007: Master Cheng Yen, founder of Tzu-Chi, the Buddhist Compassion Relief Tzu-Chi Foundation, Taiwan
2008: Prince Hassan bin Talal, Jordan
2009: Reverend Canon Gideon Byamugisha, Uganda
2010: Ela Bhatt, India
2011: Sulak Sivaraksa, Thailand
2012: Rosalina Tuyuc, Guatemala
2013: Gunnar Stålsett, Norway
2014: Dena Merriam, U.S.
2015: Esther Ibanga, Nigeria
2016: Center for Peace Building and Reconciliation (CPBR), Sri Lanka
2017: Munib Younan, Palestine
2018: Adyan Foundation, Lebanon
2019: John Paul Lederach, U.S.
2020: Ven. Pomnyun Sunim, South Korea
2021: Venerable Chao-hwei, Taiwan
2022: Michael Lapsley, South Africa
2023: Rajagopal P. V., India
2024: Mohammed Abu-Nimer, Palestine/U.S.
2025: Musawah
2026: Benki Piyãko, Brazil
