= List of assassinations by France =

This is a list of people who have been targets of assassination by the French government.

== Assassinations ==
Target	Nationality	Position	Date	City	Country	Perpetrator	Method
Ayyash Al-Haj	State of Syria	Syrian revolutionary	1926	Jableh	State of Syria	French Mandate authorities	Poisoned.
Mandel Szkolnikoff	Belarus/France	Businessman and Nazi collaborator	10 June 1945	El Molar, Madrid	Spain	Direction générale des études et recherches	Accidentally given fatal overdose during kidnapping.
Farhat Hached	Tunisia	Labor unionist	5 December 1952	Near Radès	French protectorate of Tunisia	La Main Rouge	Shot to death.
"Homo" Operations	Various		1954—1962	Various	Algeria	SDECE	Done throughout the Algerian War. Responsible for the assassinations of roughly 100—200 people.
Jacques Lemaigre-Dubreuil	France	Businessman, activist	11 June 1955	Casablanca	Morocco	La Main Rouge	Shot.
Mostefa Ben Boulaïd	Algeria	National Liberation Front commander	22 March 1956	Arris	French Algeria	French Army	Detonation of booby-trapped radio device.
Larbi Ben M'hidi	Algeria	National Liberation Front member	4 March 1957	Algiers	French Algeria	French paratroopers	Torture murder.
Ali Boumendjel	Algeria	National Liberation Army fighter, lawyer	23 March 1957	El Biar, Algiers	French Algeria	French Army	Thrown out of a window.
Rahal Saad	Algeria	Pharmacist, National Liberation Army associate	April 1957	Meknes	Morocco	French paramilitary soldiers	Parcel bomb.
Maurice Audin	France	Political activist, mathematician	21 June 1957	Algiers	French Algeria	Soldiers of the 10th Parachute Division	Torture murder.
Georges Geiser	Switzerland	Technician, manufacturer of explosives detonators	9 September 1957	Geneva	Switzerland	La Main Rouge	Stabbed.
Marcel Léopold	Switzerland	Arms dealer and entrepreneur	19 September 1957	Geneva	Switzerland	La Main Rouge	Poisoned by dart gun.
Leo Geiser	Switzerland	Arms dealer	9 November 1957	Geneva	Switzerland	La Main Rouge	Poisoned by dart gun and stabbed.
Ruben Um Nyobè	Cameroon	Politician	13 September 1958	Nyong-et-Kellé	French Cameroon	French Army	Shot to death.
Améziane Aït Ahcène	Algeria	Lawyer, ambassador of the Algerian Front de Libération Nationale	5 November 1958	Bonn	West Germany	La Main Rouge	Shot and died of his injuries.
Georg Puchert	West Germany	Arms dealer	3 May 1959	Frankfurt	West Germany	La Main Rouge	Car bomb.
Amokrane Ould Aoudia	France / Algeria	Student, National Liberation Army lawyer	23 May 1959	Paris	France	SDECE	Shot to death.
Félix-Roland Moumié	Cameroon	Anti-colonialist leader	3 November 1960	Geneva	Switzerland	William Bechtel	Poisoned with thalium.
Fernando Pereira	Portugal / Netherlands	Photographer	10 July 1985	Auckland	New Zealand	Directorate General for External Security	Drowned in deliberate sinking of the Rainbow Warrior.
Omar Ould Hamaha	Mali	Spokesman and chief of staff for both Ansar Dine and Movement for Oneness and Jihad in West Africa	8 March 2014	Kidal	Mali	Special Operations Command (France)	Air strike.
Ahmed al-Tilemsi	Mali	Senior figure of the Movement for Oneness and Jihad in West Africa (MUJAO) and al-Mourabitoun	10–11 December 2014	Tabankort	Mali	French Special Forces	Shot in raid.
Mokhtar Belmokhtar	Algeria	Leader of the group Al-Murabitoun, smuggler, weapons dealer	November 2016	Unknown	Libya	French Air and Space Force	Air strike.
Abdelmalek Droukdel	Algeria	Emir of Al-Qaeda in the Islamic Maghreb	3 June 2020	Talahandak	Mali	French Special Forces	Air strike.
Ba Ag Moussa	Mali	Militant and jihadist	10 November 2020	Essouk	Mali	French Special Forces	Shot in special military operation.
Adnan Abu Walid al-Sahrawi	Sahrawi Arab Democratic Republic	First Emir of the Islamic State – Sahel Province	17 August 2021	Dangalous Forest	Mali	French Armed Forces	Drone strike.

== Attempted assassinations ==
Target	Nationality	Position	Date	City	Country	Perpetrator	Method
Ahmed Ben Bella	Algeria	National Liberation Front leader	July 1956	Cairo	Egypt	French paramilitary soldiers	Shooting.
Otto Schlüter	West Germany	Armourer for the State of Hamburg	26 September 1956	Hamburg	West Germany	La Main Rouge	Bomb. Assistant killed in attempt.
Ahmed Kamal	United States	Arms dealer	March 1957	Madrid	Spain	French paramilitary soldiers	Shooting.
Allal al-Fassi	Morocco	Moroccan nationalist leader	April 1957	Tangier	Morocco	French paramilitary soldiers	Remote-controlled charge.
Otto Schlüter	West Germany	Armourer for the State of Hamburg	3 June 1957	Hamburg	West Germany	La Main Rouge	Car bomb. Schlüter's mother killed in attempt.
Louis Tonnelot	France	Director of the Maurice-Loustau Hospital	June 1957	Oujda	Morocco	French paramilitary soldiers	Bombing.
Bou Zidia	Algeria	National Liberation Front associate	August 1957	Rabat	Morocco	French paramilitary soldiers	Shooting. Only injured.
Marcel Léopold	Switzerland	Arms dealer and entrepreneur	September 1957	Geneva	Switzerland	French paramilitary soldiers	Shooting.
Omar Ouamrane	Algeria	National Liberation Front leader	September 1957	Tunis	Tunisia	French paramilitary soldiers	Remote-controlled charge. Detonated prematurely and killed operators rather than Ouamrane.
Tayeb Boulahrouf	Algeria	Militant and jihadist	May 1959	Rome	Italy	La Main Rouge	Car bombing. 10 year old killed in attempt.
