= List of Soviet assassinations =

This is a list of people confirmed and alleged to have been assassinated by the government of the Soviet Union. Some of the assassinations or targeted killings took place overseas.

== Soviet assassinations ==
Assassinations confirmed or generally accepted to have been committed by the Soviet Union.

Target	Position	Date	City	Country	Perpetrator	Method
Fyodor Kokoshkin	Member of the First Russian State Duma	1918-01-20	Leningrad	Russian SFSR	Petrograd Military Revolutionary Committee	Shot.
Nicholas II	last Tsar of Russia	1918-07-17	Yekaterinburg	Russian SFSR	Cheka	Execution.
Francis Cromie	British naval attaché	1918-08-31	Petrograd	Russian SFSR	Bolsheviks	Killed in combat
Alexander Dutov	Russian Cossacks	1921-02-07	Suiding	China	Bolsheviks	Shot.
Vladimir Nesterovich	Defected Red Army commander and intelligence officer	1925-08-06	Mainz	Germany	GRU	Poisoning.
Pyotr Wrangel	Russian White Army General	1928-04-25	Brussels	Belgium	Soviet agent	Poisoning.
Alexander Kutepov	White Army General	1930-01-26	Paris	France	OGPU	Heart attack during kidnapping.
Noe Ramishvili	former Prime Minister of Georgia	1930-12-07	Paris	France	OGPU	Shot.
Sergey Kirov	First Secretary of the Leningrad City Bolsheviks	1934-12-01	Leningrad	Soviet Union	NKVD	Shot by revolver.
Faizal Maksum	One of the leaders of the Basmachi movement	1935-??-??	Kashgar	East Turkestan	NKVD	
Nester Lakoba	Chairman of the Central Executive Committee of the Abkhaz ASSR	1936-12-28	Tbilisi	Georgian SSR	NKVD	Poisoned.
Andreu Nin	Leader of the Workers' Party of Marxist Unification (POUM)	1937-06-20	Alcalá de Henares, Madrid	Second Spanish Republic	NKVD	Tortured to death.
Aghasi Khanjian	First Secretary of the Communist Party of Armenia	1937-07-09	Tbilisi	Georgian SSR	NKVD	Shot.
Georges Agabekov	Defected OGPU agent	1937-08-??	Pyrenees Mountains	Unsure French or Spanish side in the Pyrenees Mountains	NKVD	Unknown.
Ignace Reiss	Soviet spy	1937-09-04	Lausanne	Switzerland	NKVD	Strangulation and/or machine gun.
Kurt Landau	Austrian communist, Member of the International Left Opposition	1937-09-23	Barcelona	Second Spanish Republic	NKVD	Unknown.
Yevhen Konovalets	Leader of the Organization of Ukrainian Nationalists	1938-05-23	Rotterdam	Netherlands	NKVD	Explosive hidden in box of chocolates.
Rudolf Klement	Senior official in the Fourth International and longtime confidant of Trotsky	1938-07-13	Paris	France	NKVD	Unknown. Possible beheading.
Zinaida Reich	Soviet actress	1939-07-15	Moscow	Soviet Union	NKVD	Stabbing.
Jadwiga Szeptycka	Archaeologist and ethnographer	1939-09-27	Prylbychi	Second Polish Republic	NKVD	Shot.
Leon Trotsky	Soviet politician and Marxist revolutionary theorist	1940-08-21	Coyoacán	Mexico	NKVD	Exsanguination from attack by ice pick
Nikolai Koltsov	Soviet biologist	1940-12-02	Leningrad	Soviet Union	NKVD	Poisoning.
Mairbek Sheripov	Chechen nationalist	1942-11-07	Chechnya	Soviet Union	Soviet security force	Soviet reprisal raid.
Wilhelm Kube	Generalkommissar of Weissruthenien	1943-09-22	Minsk	Soviet Union	Yelena Mazanik	Timed explosive.
Solomon Mikhoels	Soviet actor and the artistic director of the Moscow State Jewish Theatre.	1948-01-13	Minsk	Soviet Union	MGB	Death staged as traffic accident.
Khasan Israilov	Chechen nationalist	1944-12-29	Chechnya	Soviet Union	Soviet security force	Unknown.
Yurii Lypa	Ukrainian nationalist	1944-08-20	Shutova	Ukrainian SSR	NKVD	Tortured to death.
Konstantin Volkov	Soviet diplomat and NKVD officer	1945-09-??	Istanbul	Turkey	NKVD	Disappeared from his post.
Isaiah Oggins	American-born spy for the Soviet secret police	1947-??-??	Norilsk	Russian SFSR	NKVD	Poisoned with curare.
Theodore Romzha	Bishop of the Greek Catholic Eparchy of Mukachevo	1947-10-31	Uzhhorod	Ukrainian SSR	NKVD	Poisoned with curare.
Wolfgang Salus	Czechoslovak Trotskyist	1953-03-05	Munich	West Germany	KGB	Poisoned.
Alexander Trushnovich	Chairman of the Committee for Aid to Russian Refugees, leader of the National Alliance of Russian Solidarists	1954-04-13	West Berlin	West Germany	KGB	Choked to death during botched kidnapping.
Danylo Skoropadskyi	Leader of the Hetmanite movement	1957-02-23	London	United Kingdom	KGB	Poisoned with air gun.
Lev Rebet	Leader of the Organization of Ukrainian Nationalists	1957-10-10	Munich	West Germany	KGB	Poisoning with vapor gun.
Imre Nagy	Chairman of the Council of Ministers of the People's Republic of Hungary	1958-06-16	Budapest	Hungary	Soviet show trial	Execution.
Stepan Bandera	Leader of the Organization of Ukrainian Nationalists	1959-10-15	Munich	West Germany	KGB	Poisoning by cyanide gas.
Nicholas Shadrin	Defected Soviet naval officer	1975-12-20	Vienna	Austria	KGB	Accidental forced overdose during kidnapping.
Mohammed Daoud Khan	President of Afghanistan	1978-04-28	Kabul	Afghanistan	KGB / PDPA: KGB was most likely involved as the Saur Revolution was a Soviet-backed coup	Shot.
Georgi Markov	Bulgarian dissident journalist	1978-09-11	London	United Kingdom	KGB	Poisoning by ricin-filled pellet by Bulgarian umbrella.
Hafizullah Amin	President of Afghanistan	1979-12-27	Kabul	Afghanistan	KGB	Targeted assault on the Tajbeg Palace (see: Operation Storm-333)

== Alleged assassinations ==
Assassinations alleged or suspected to have been carried out by the Soviet Union.

Target	Position	Date	City	Country	Perpetrator	Method
Nikolay Vtorov	Russian industrialist	1918-05-20	Moscow	Russian SFSR	Bolsheviks	Unknown.
Juliet Stuart Poyntz	CPUSA member and soviet intelligence agent	1937-06-03	New York	United States	NKVD	Possible execution.
Lev Sedov	Leon Trotsky's eldest son	1938-02-16	Paris	France	NKVD	Shot.
Walter Krivitsky	Defected Soviet intelligence officer	1941-02-10	Washington, D.C.	United States	NKVD	Shot by revolver.
Arkadi Maslow	Leading figure in the Communist Party of Germany	1941-11-20	Havana	Cuba	NKVD	Shot.
Leonid Karas	Belarusian writer and journalist for Radio Liberty	1954-09-??	Munich	West Germany	KGB	Drowning.
Abdurrahman Fatalibeyli	Defected Soviet army major; CIA agent and later chief of the Azerbaijani desk for Radio Liberty	1954-11-22	Munich	West Germany	KGB	Strangulation.
Ilie Motrescu	Romanian writer	1969-07-26	Near Krasnoilsk	Ukrainian SSR	KGB	Unknown.
Alla Horska	Ukrainian Soviet dissident	1970-11-28	Vasylkiv	Ukrainian SSR	KGB	Shot and disguised as a murder-suicide.
Sultan Ibraimov	Prime Minister of Kyrgyzstan	1980-12-04	Cholpon Ata	Soviet Union	KGB	Shot twice in the head.

== Attempted assassinations ==
Target	Position	Date	City	Country	Killer	Method
Indalecio Prieto	Minister of the National Defence	1937	Bilbao	Second Spanish Republic	NKVD	Unspecified.
Georgiy Okolovich	Anti-communist dissident	1954	Frankfurt	West Germany	KGB	Cigarette case disguised poison gun.
Nikolai Khokhlov	Soviet defector	1957-09	Frankfurt	West Germany	KGB	Poisoning with thallium.
Vladimir Kostov	Bulgarian journalist	1978-08-26	Paris	France	KGB	Poisoning with Bulgarian umbrella.

== See also ==
- List of assassinations in Europe § Russia
- List of Russian assassinations
- List of assassinations by the United States
- List of Israeli assassinations
- List of journalists killed in Russia
- List of Second Chechen War assassinations
- List of Mossad operations
- List of Assassinations by France
