= Amokrane Ould Aoudia =

Algerian politician (1924–1959)

- Born: 23 November 1924; Michelet, French Algeria
- Died: 23 May 1959 (aged 34); Paris, France
- Citizenship: French and Algerian
- Education: Faculty of Algiers, Law degree
- Occupation: Lawyer
- Known for: Lawyer defending FLN members

Amokrane Ould Aoudia (23 November 1924 – 23 May 1959) was a French Algerian student associated with the PCA in Algiers. In Paris, he was one of the communist students of the Sorbonne and a member of the PCF; he was also a lawyer for the FLN.

== Biography ==
=== Early life and studies ===
Amokrane Ould Aoudia was born in Michelet on 23 November 1924, in a Christianised Kabyle family with a history of going into law. His uncle, Boudjemâ Benjamin Ould Aoudia, also a native of Michelet, was a simple shepherd who had been picked up by the White Fathers of Ouaghzen in October 1899 and converted to Catholicism. He became a lawyer at the Algiers bar and a member of the "group of 61", the Muslims of the Algerian assembly demanding the right to self-determination. Amokrane's father was a public works contractor. His mother did not work.

Amokrane Ould Aoudia first attended school in Ouaghzen, then college in Tizi-Ouzou. He was then admitted to the vocational school of Maison-Carrée reserved for the technical education of "natives". After World War II, Amokrane Ould Aoudia gave up on becoming an army officer. Close to the Algerian Communist Party, he became a boarding school teacher in Algiers and gave private lessons, before enrolling at the faculty of Algiers to study law.

== Early law career ==
As a lawyer registered at the Paris Bar in 1954, his first client was his friend Jean Beckouche, federally responsible for the language groups of colonial students, who was appointed by the EOR for political reasoning. It was Amokrane Ould Aoudia who decided to take the case to the Paris Administrative Court and file an "abuse of power" complaint against the Secretary of State for War.

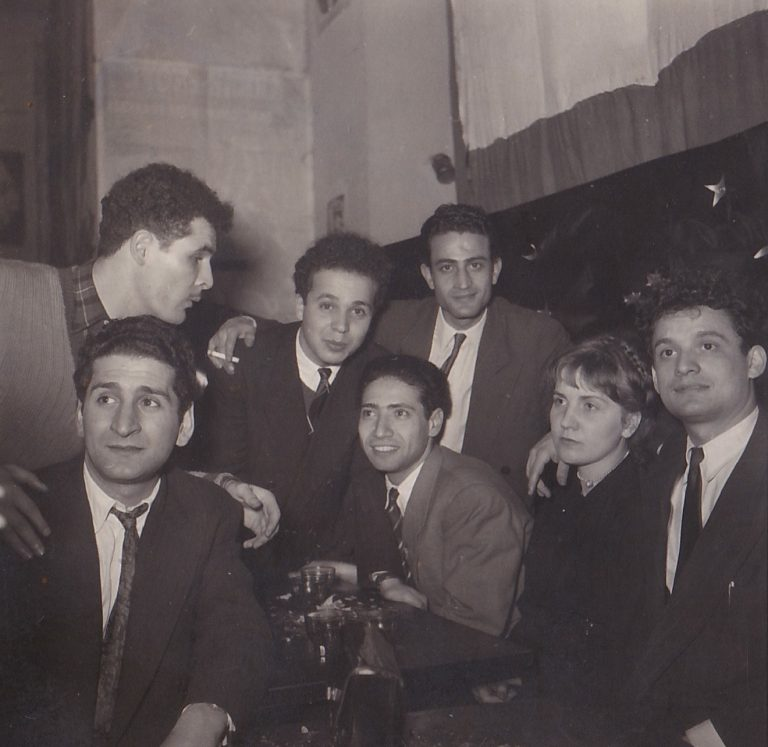
Algerian student language. Alongside them are three Algerian Jewish friends, a European communist from Tunisia and his French partner. Upon returning to Algeria, Ahmed Inal joined the National Liberation Army. Unfortunately, he was captured, assassinated and burned alive by the French army in 1956.

== Algerian War ==
The Algerian war was an interruption in his political engagement as it ended the PCF anti-colonial line. He then joined the FLN. Initially associated with the lawyer Mourad Oussedik, he decided in 1957 to open his own practice, first at No.1 Rue Anatole France, then in November 1958, at Rue Saint-Marc near the stock exchange. Known for his sympathies for the FLN and his commitment to the independence of Algeria, he rarely dealt with ordinary law trials, mainly engaged in pleading political cases.

Likewise, he worked mainly in France, only going once to Algeria to plead alongside Ali Boumendjel. executed by paratroopers in March 1957. Like other lawyers responsible for the defence of activists in favour of Algerian independence, Ould Aoudia denounced the torture practised by the French army and police during the conflict. Thus, with Jacques Vergès, he sent on September 8, 1958, an open letter to the Minister of Culture, André Malraux, to denounce the torture suffered by two of his clients, Hocine Rezgui, a worker from the Potez factories, and Mohamed Krama, driver at the Teka factories in Courbevoie, at the Argenteuil police station, where police violence was frequent and daily.

== Assassination ==
Amokrane Ould Aoudia was shot dead on 23 May 1959 in front of his office in the 2nd arrondissement of Paris. According to investigative journalist Vincent Nouzille, this assassination was carried out by the French SDECE as part of an Operation Homo, a targeted assassination.

== See also ==
- Jacques Vergès
