= Opérations homo =

Targeted killings by French intelligence

A "homo operation" (short for "homicide") is an operation designed to eliminate individuals (targeted killing), carried out by the Action Service of France's foreign intelligence agency (the Service de documentation extérieure et de contre-espionnage—SDECE—and subsequently the Directorate-General for External Security—DGSE).

A dedicated commando group was reportedly established within the Action Service to carry out these neutralization operations; this group was dubbed "Cell Alpha" according to Vincent Nouzille.

== Under the Fourth Republic ==
Under the Fourth Republic, the President of the Council Guy Mollet gave the green light for several "homo operations" in 1957.

According to Vincent Nouzille, the director of the SDECE, Paul Grossin, agreed to carry out "homo" operations on the condition that they:

- be authorized by the political leadership;
- not be conducted during peacetime;
- never target French citizens;
- and never take place on French soil.

Paul Grossin left his post in 1962.

== Under the Fifth Republic ==
=== Presidency of Charles de Gaulle ===
Between 1959 and 1962, under the presidency of Charles de Gaulle, a special committee issued directives to the Action Service of the SDECE (External Documentation and Counter-Espionage Service). It was composed of General de Gaulle's representative, Jacques Foccart, Prime Minister Michel Debré, and Constantin Melnik.

During the Algerian War, "homo" operations targeted intellectuals, activists, or officials of the FLN. A unit of one thousand hand-picked paratroopers had been placed at the disposal of the SDECE in 1957 to "secretly carry out missions that the State could not conduct openly: on the one hand, military operations outside Algeria—specifically, attacks on FLN bases abroad, particularly in Tunisia—and on the other, the elimination of FLN activists or leaders in Europe and their actual or suspected supporters."

According to the intelligence coordinator at the time, Constantin Melnik, approximately 140 people were reportedly executed in 1960, and the total death toll is estimated to be around 200. Prior to 1959, a few targeted assassination operations ("opérations homo") succeeded, notably the killing of Améziane Aït Ahcène in Bonn, West Germany, or that of arms dealer Marcel Léopold in Geneva—a supplier to Georg Puchert. Responsibility for these attacks was claimed by the mysterious organization La Main Rouge, which, according to Jean Guisnel, was a front created by the SDECE. Major targeted assassination operations ordered by the committee between 1959 and 1962 included a car-bomb attack against Taïeb Boulahrouf in Rome—which failed but killed a 10-year-old child named Rolando Rovai—and the attack on Amokrane Ould Aoudia, a member of the FLN's legal defense team.

=== Presidency of Georges Pompidou ===
The successive presidencies of Pompidou and Giscard d'Estaing were marked by the appointment—to the Service de documentation extérieure et de contre-espionnage (SDECE)—of the director-general named by President Pompidou: Alexandre de Marenches. According to Jean-Christophe Notin, from at least 1970 to 1977, Marenches did not order any "homo" operations—not so much out of ethical concerns, but because "killing represents the highest level of risk for an agency and signals the failure of other possible interventions. If exposed, it is France that faces international censure."

=== Presidency of Valéry Giscard d'Estaing ===
In 1977, President Valéry Giscard d’Estaing reportedly refused to greenlight the execution of the terrorist Carlos (Ilich Ramírez Sánchez), who had murdered two police officers in Paris two years earlier.

=== Presidency of François Mitterrand ===
François Mitterrand initially did not authorize any targeted killing operations. Upon taking over as Director General of the SDECE, Pierre Marion discovered that his predecessor had approved a plan to stage an attack against Libyan head of state Muammar Gaddafi. François Mitterrand refused to carry out the operation, declaring it contrary to his philosophy.

Following the assassination of French ambassador Louis Delamare on September 4, 1981, the President's doctrine shifted. Mitterrand authorized a targeted killing operation: a commando unit from the DGSE's Action Service (formerly the SDECE) killed the diplomat's two assassins, and the secret services recruited local proxies in Syria to blow up the Ba'ath Party headquarters in Damascus on November 29, 1981—an operation that left 175 people dead.

Following the Rue des Rosiers attack, Mitterrand formally authorized the DGSE to kill two men: the terrorists Carlos (Ilich Ramírez Sánchez) and Abu Nidal (Sabri al-Banna). He implicitly authorized other targeted killing operations whenever the Director General of the DGSE deemed them necessary. In doing so, he gave his tacit approval for operations without having to explicitly take responsibility for them. According to DGSE Director François Mermet, this placed the DGSE in an uncomfortable position, as the agency itself largely had to decide whether to greenlight an operation.

Following the "Drakkar" attacks on October 23, 1983, a targeted killing operation was planned. Following the failure of the Rainbow Warrior case and the rapid identification of the "fake Turenge couple," an elite unit dubbed "Alpha Cell" was established by Jean Heinrich in 1987, operating clandestinely within the DGSE's Action Service.

Claude Silberzahn, director of the DGSE for the greater part of François Mitterrand's second term, stated that "in reality, very few "executions" are carried out within the Services". A former Action Service officer suggests otherwise. Roland Dumas recounts that President Mitterrand confided in him: "Reasons of state, Roland—they don't exist. In my fourteen years of public service, I had to give that order once or twice: specifically regarding a terrorist who had blown up two of our key agents in an apartment in Paris's Latin Quarter".

=== Presidency of Jacques Chirac ===
President Jacques Chirac was reluctant to authorize targeted killing operations, viewing them as too risky following the DGSE's successive failures in the 1980s.

In September 2001, he refused a CIA request to collaborate on targeting Al-Qaeda members, citing both moral and technical grounds. However, he reportedly relied on cooperation with the United States to leverage their strike capabilities against French targets.

=== Presidency of Nicolas Sarkozy ===
President Nicolas Sarkozy was a more determined proponent of covert operations, yet he relied primarily on the military's special forces rather than the DGSE.

=== Presidency of François Hollande ===
François Hollande's presidency was marked by controversy regarding targeted strikes orchestrated by the French state and by confusion between "homo" operations (covert targeted killings) and military targeted killings via airstrikes. In the interview-based book Un président ne devrait pas dire ça..., the president acknowledged having ordered at least four targeted killings during his term, likely including that of the Somali Islamist leader Ahmed Abdi Godane in September 2014. Journalist Vincent Nouzille confirmed that the President reportedly ordered the killing of around forty jihadists between 2013 and 2016, including eight French nationals—among them Macreme Abrougui, killed by a French strike in Syria on October 7, 2016—and five others killed in targeted strikes using American drones: David Drugeon, Charaffe El-Mouadan, Boubaker El Hakim, Salah Gourmat, and Walid Hamam. Abdelhamid Abaaoud, one of the key organizers of the November 13, 2015 attacks in France, was reportedly the target of an operation in late summer 2015 that was ultimately aborted to avoid collateral damage among the civilian population.

However, these executions were not "homo" operations—covert missions carried out by the DGSE—but rather targeted strikes organized by the French military. Intelligence specialist Jean-Christophe Notin describes the confusion on the part of Nouzille, Davet, and Lhomme as "fantasies", and Jean Guisnel confirms in 2019 that these were assassinations organized by the army, rather than targeted killings ("opérations homo").

According to Notin, only the killing of Ahmed Godane could be considered a targeted killing. Based on interviews with sources close to the Élysée during Hollande's five-year term, Jean Guisnel concludes that the president likely did not order any such targeted killings.

According to former DGSE director Claude Silberzahn, "homo" operations were an "element of stability in the world", but "no intelligence agency worthy of the name resorts to them except with extreme restraint and under very specific conditions".

== Bibliography ==
- Cheurfi, Achour (2004). Dictionnaire de la révolution algérienne (1954-1962) - dictionnaire biographique (in French). Algiers: Casbah Éditions. ISBN 9961-64-478-6.
- Melnik, Constantin (1996). La mort était leur mission (in French). Paris: Plon. ISBN 2-259-18411-1.
- Martinet, Pierre (2012). Cellule delta - Roman (in French). Paris: Flammarion. ISBN 978-2-08-125095-6.
- Nouzille, Vincent (2015). Les tueurs de la République - assassinats et opérations spéciales des services secrets (in French). Paris: Fayard. ISBN 978-2-213-67176-5.
- Nouzille, Vincent (2020-09-30). Les tueurs de la République - Nouvelle édition (in French). Fayard/Mazarine. ISBN 978-2-86374-802-2. - 2020 reprint, extending the book to cover the Macron presidency.
- Nouzille, Vincent (2017). Erreurs fatales - comment nos présidents ont failli face au terrorisme (in French). Paris: Fayard. ISBN 978-2-213-69398-9.
