= FNC =

FNC may refer to:

== Entertainment ==
- Festival du nouveau cinéma, a Canadian film festival
- Fight Night Champion, a video game
- Fnatic, a European professional esports organization
- FNC Entertainment, a South Korean record label

=== Television ===
- Florida's News Channel, a defunct American television channel
- Fox News Channel, an American television channel

== Other uses ==
- Farncombe railway station, in England
- Federal National Council (United Arab Emirates)
- Federal Networking Council, in the United States
- Fédération Nationale Catholique, a defunct French anti-secular movement
- FN FNC, a Belgian assault rifle
- FNC Inc., an American mortgage technology company
- First Niagara Center, in New York, United States
- Forum non conveniens
- Cristiano Ronaldo International Airport, in Madeira, Portugal
- National Front of Catalonia (Catalan: Front Nacional de Catalunya)
- Front Nacional de Catalunya (2013), a political party in Catalonia
- Fédération des contribuables - A French taxpayer group active in the 1930s
