= Mourad Oussedik =

Mourad Oussedik, born on 26 August 1926 in Bougaa, Algeria, and died on 14 June 2005 in Paris, was a Franco-Algerian lawyer.

He was known for defending the activists of the FLN. He was one of the founding members of the group of lawyers of the FLN together with Jacques Vergès. He became a deputy of the first constituent assembly of the Algerian Republic and then defended, in particular, the terrorist Illitch Ramirez Sanchez (alias “Carlos the Jackal”) and the Church of Scientology.

== Biography ==
He came from a family of notables from Aïn El Hammam (ex-Michelet), in Greater Kabylia. His father, Sedik, was a lawyer in Béjaïa, his mother came from one of the richest and most powerful families of Algeria, which made fortune under the Regency of Algiers the maraboutic family AMEUR.

== The group of FLN lawyers ==
Arrested for insubordination in 1949 by the French authorities, while he was a lawyer in Bejaïa (Petite Kabylie, 250 km east of Algiers), Mourad Oussedik was contacted in 1955 by the FLN to form a group of lawyers. What he did with Amokrane Ould Aoudia, Abdessamad Ben Abdallah and Jacques Vergès. The lawyer Jean-Jacques de Felice also collaborated with Mourad Oussedik. During the years of the Algerian war, several lawyers were killed, either by police forces or by agents of OAS a little later, for example Amokrane Ould Aoudia, who was shot dead on May 23, 1959 in front of his office, by the order of the French secret services. With around one hundred members, the group undertook during the liberation war to defend the rights of the FLN activists of the federation of France. Not long after that they were joined by Roland Dumas or Gisèle Halimi.

=== Shooting at Le Thélème bar (February 28, 1975) ===
Mourad Oussedik is one of the lawyers injured in February 1975, during the operation against the Zemmour Brothers in the Parisian bar Le Thélème (today Le Cardinal Saint-Germain), which created "One of the bloodiest events of the anti-gang war against the Parisian milieu".

=== Other Issues ===
Registered at the Paris Bar, he has been the defender of opponents of King Hassan II of Morocco, Kurdish demonstrators arrested in Paris, as well as many Algerian nationals in France, including the singer Khaled."I went to find Master Oussedik, telling him that I had problems, and he found solutions for them", testified one of his clients at his funeral. It was also Mourad Oussedik who, alongside Jacques Vergès, defended the terrorist Carlos in the early 1990s, then the Church of Scientology in 1999. Nothing contradictory in this profession, according to the testimony of a friend and colleague. : “In 1960, Mourad Oussedik defended the FLN. I found myself defending the interests of members of the Organisation armée secrète (OAS). But deep down, we were both for freedom. "

== See also ==
- Jacques Vergès
