= Jacques Lemaigre-Dubreuil =

French businessman and activist (1894–1955)

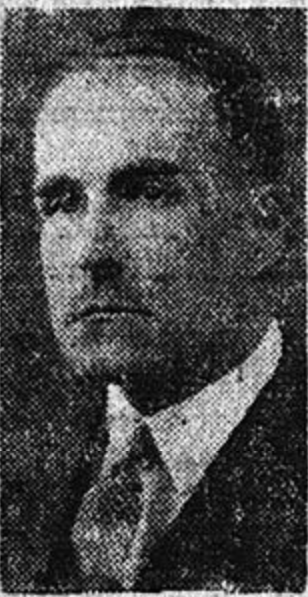
- Lemaigre-Dubreuil in Le Petit Journal of March 3, 1935
- Born: 30 October 1894; Solignac, France
- Died: 11 June 1955 (aged 60); Casablanca, Morocco
- Cause of death: Murder
- Citizenship: France
- Occupations: Business, activism
- Movement: Anti-communism movement
- Spouse: Simone Lesieur

Jacques Lemaigre-Dubreuil (French pronunciation: [ʒak ləmɛɡʁə dybʁœj]; 30 October 1894 – 11 June 1955) was a French businessman and activist, born in Solignac, Haute-Vienne and murdered in Casablanca in 1955, presumably by members of La Main Rouge (The Red Hand) for being allegedly sympathetic to the Moroccan nationalist cause.

He married Simone Lesieur, daughter of Georges Lesieur – founder of the brand of edible oils of the same name (Huiles Lesieur). Having joined its board of directors in 1926, he directed and developed the company until his death. He owned the Maroc-Presse newspaper and had interests in the Printemps department store chain.

An active militant of the anti-communism movement, particularly through his leadership of the Fédération des contribuables, he was one of the funders of La Cagoule in the late 1930s.

During the Second World War, he was very active in the underground. He was one of those who favoured the Allied landings in North Africa, on 8 November 1942, Operation Torch. He was a link between Robert Murphy and Henri Giraud; when the latter arrived in Algeria, he was accommodated in Lemaigre-Dubreuil's house.

Later, Lemaigre-Dubreuil was very active in supporting Moroccan claims for autonomy, for which he drew fierce hatred from movements supporting the retention of Morocco as a French protectorate. These movements, described at the time as terrorist-cons had many accomplices in European circles, including the French administration. It is suspected the French secret service were closely related to some of them, such as La Main Rouge (The Red Hand).

Lemaigre-Dubreuil was assassinated by French extremist settlers for his support of Moroccan independence, in Casablanca on the evening of 11 June 1955, in the square that later bore his name, at the foot of the "Liberté" building where he lived. His funeral took place on 14 June in the Cathedral of the Sacred Heart of Casablanca.
