= Hugo Salus =

German-Czech doctor, writer and poet

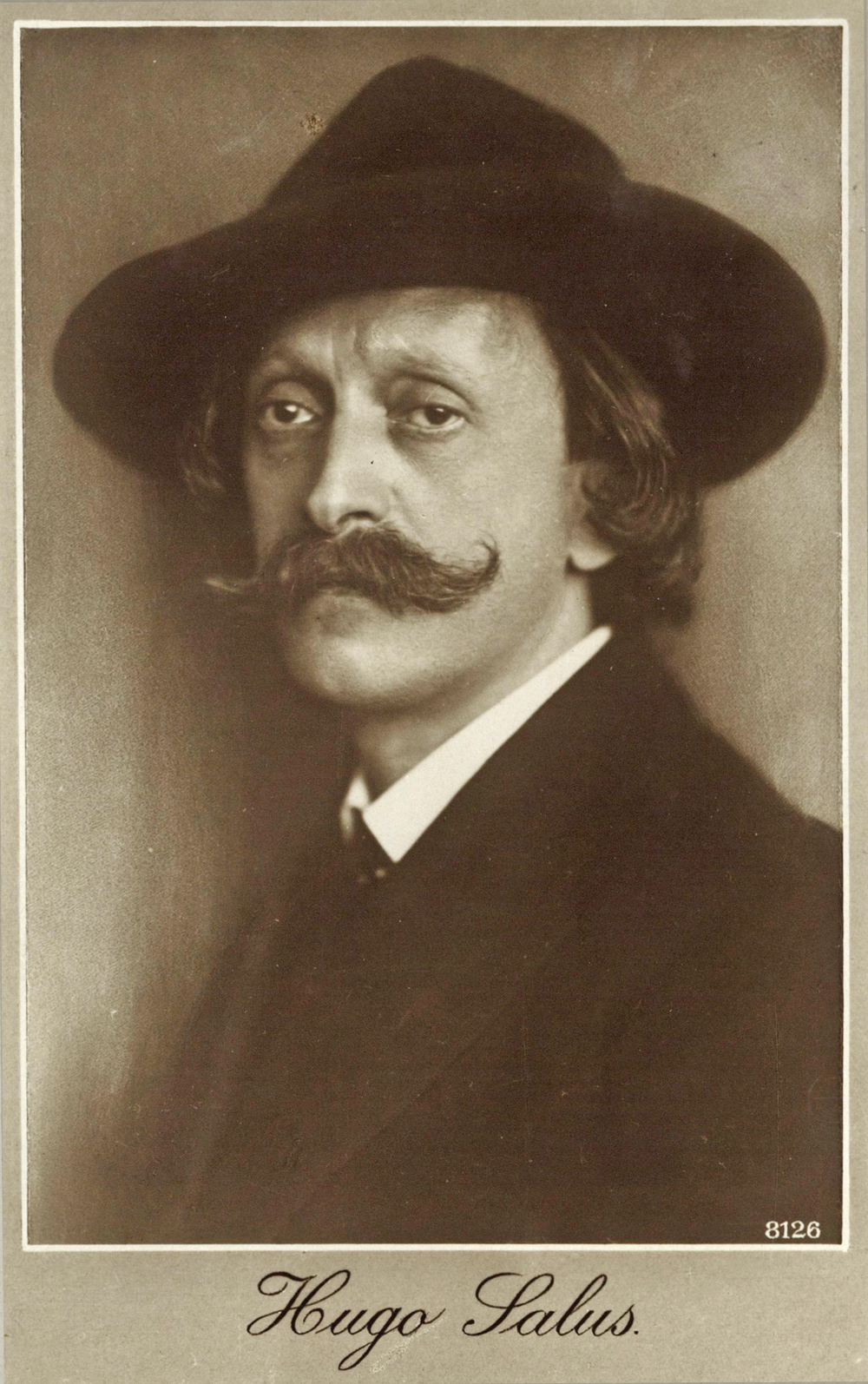
- Salus in the 1900s
- Born: 3 August 1866; Česká Lípa, Bohemia, Austrian Empire
- Died: 4 February 1929 (aged 62); Prague, Czechoslovakia
- Burial place: Olšany Cemetery, Prague
- Occupations: Medical doctor, writer, poet
- Children: Wolfgang Salus

Hugo Salus (3 August 1866 – 4 February 1929) was a German-Czech medical doctor, writer and poet.

== Life ==
Salus was born in Česká Lípa, Bohemia, Austrian Empire on 3 August 1866. He studied medicine in Prague and established a practice in gynaecology there from 1895 onwards. Apart from his professional activities as a doctor, he published numerous volumes of poetry and short stories, and was one of the more important exponents of German-Jewish literature in the Prague of his day, moving in a circle which included younger figures of the stature of Franz Kafka, Max Brod, Franz Werfel, Egon Erwin Kisch, Oskar Baum, Johannes Urzidil, Paul Kornfeld, Ernst Weiss and Kamil Hoffmann. Several of his works were illustrated by Heinrich Vogeler, while Arnold Schoenberg set two of his poems to music. A prolific author, he soon became 'the acknowledged arbiter of Prague literary taste', and "the most respected Bohemian poet writing in German" at the time. An early friend and mentor of Rainer Maria Rilke, his verse had some influence on Rilke's early lyric style.

To some of his fellow Jewish intellectuals, he was regarded as an unadulterated "assimilationist," and "a militant protagonist of German liberalism and Jewish assimilation" whose attachment to Zionism was little more than a matter of embracing a fashionable trend (Mode-Zionismus). Lothar Kahn, on the other hand, says that while Salus was described by Max Brod as an unqualified assimilationist, "this may be an exaggeration, Salus did hope, all else failing, for full Jewish absorption into the host society."

Of both him and his rival Friedrich Adler, Kafka biographer Peter Mailloux says, "their Jewishness existed in name only." The philosopher Emil Utitz put it a bit differently, "Both acknowledged Jews, they nevertheless felt themselves to be the authentic representatives of all Germans in Bohemia, as well as further afield. Those Germans wanted little to do with Prague in any case, and least of all with its Jews. But Salus and Adler were liberals of the old stamp." Kahn notes that "Salus made use of Jewish folkways and observances in his poetry, plays, and occasional fiction."

Salus died in Prague on 4 February 1929, aged 62.

== Works (a selection) ==
=== Poems ===
- Gedichte. 1898
- Neue Gedichte. 1899
- Ehefrühling. 1900
- Reigen. 1900
- Christa. Ein Evangelium der Schönheit. 1902
- Ernte. 1903
- Neue Garben. 1904
- Die Blumenschale. 1908
- Glockenklang. 1911
- Das neue Buch. 1919
- Klarer Klang. 1922
- Helle Träume. 1924
- Die Harfe Gottes. 1928

=== Prose ===
- Novellen des Lyrikers. 1903
- Das blaue Fenster. 1906
- Trostbüchlein für Kinderlose. 1909
- Andersen-Kalender 1910 (12 Fairy tales)
- Schwache Helden. 1910
- Die Hochzeitsnacht. Die schwarzen Fahen. 1913
- Seelen und Sinne. 1913
- Nachdenkliche Geschichten. 1914
- Der Heimatstein und andere Erzählungen. 1915
- Sommerabend. 1916
- Die schöne Barbara. 1919
- Freund Kafkus. 1919
- Der Beschau. Eine Ghettogeschichte. 1920
- Der Jungfernpreis. 1921
- Vergangenheit. 1921

=== Theatre ===
- Susanna im Bade. 1901
- Römische Komödie. 1909

== Secondary literature ==
- Wertheimer, Paul: Hugo Salus, Prague 1902.
- Tinkl, Lotte: Neuromantische Elemente bei Hugo Salus und Franz Herold, Diss. Vienna, 1949.
- Franzel, Emil, 'Hugo Salus. Ein Stück versunkenes Prag,' in Sudetendeutscher Kulturalmanach, 7 (1969).
- Kletzander, Hermann, Hugo Salus und der Jugendstil, Diss. Salzburg 1977.
- Abret, Helga (1980). "Hugo Salus und Jaroslav Vrchlický. Das Verhältnis beider Dichter an Hand einiger unveröffentlichter Salus-Briefe". Österreich in Geschichte und Literatur (24): 28–34. ISSN 0029-8743.
- Theopold, Wilhelm, Doktor und Poet dazu. Dichterärzte aus fünf Jahrhunderten, 2nd impression, Mainz 1987, ISBN 3-87409-032-9.
