= Vincent Nouzille =

Vincent Nouzille (born 1958) is a French independent investigative journalist. He has also written for television documentaries, along with a number of investigative journalistic books. He has served as main reporter for L'Express, L'Expansion and Nouvel Économiste, chief editor of VSD, and columnist on RFI and France Inter.

== Life ==
He was born in Caen. He graduated from the Institut d'études politiques de Paris (Sciences Po) in 1981 and holds a master's degree in economics.

== Works ==
- Élisabeth Campagnac; Vincent Nouzille (1988). Citizen Bouygues ou l'histoire secrète d'un grand patron. Documents (in French). Paris: éd. Belfond. ISBN 2-7144-2144-X. BnF 34938548..
- Bernard de La Villardière; Vincent Nouzille (28 September 1994). L'Anti-drogue. L'épreuve des faits (in French). Paris: éd. du Seuil. ISBN 2-02-021306-0. BnF 35728885..
- Vincent Nouzille; Alexandra Schwartzbrod (1998). L'Acrobate: Jean-Luc Lagardère ou les armes du pouvoir. L'épreuve des faits (in French). Paris: éd. du Seuil. ISBN 2-02-028858-3. BnF 36699908..
- Vincent Nouzille (2000). La Traque fiscale (in French). Paris: éd. Albin Michel. ISBN 2-226-11409-2. BnF 37652008.. (Note: The cover quote « tous présumés coupables !, les fichiers secrets de Bercy, paradis fiscaux... » is not part of the title, as it is absent from the title page.)
- Jacques Follorou; Vincent Nouzille (2004). Les Parrains corses (in French) (1 ed.). Paris: éd. Fayard. ISBN 2-213-61759-7. BnF 39188081.. (Note: The cover quote « Leur histoire, leurs réseaux, leurs protections » is not on the title page and thus not part of the title.)
  - Jacques Follorou; Vincent Nouzille (2006). Les Parrains corses: Leur histoire, leurs réseaux, leurs protections. J'ai lu : document (in French). Paris: éd. J'ai lu. ISBN 2-290-34732-9. BnF 40141552.. (Note: A pocket republication, as a subtitle on the title page is the supplementary mention which features on the cover of the original edition.)
  - Jacques Follorou; Vincent Nouzille (2009). Les Parrains corses (in French) (2 ed.). Paris: éd. Fayard. ISBN 978-2-213-63739-6. BnF 41485492.. (Note: New revised and expanded edition. The cover quote from the original « Leur histoire, leurs réseaux, leurs protections », also used as a subtitle on the pocket edition, is not repeated.)
- Vincent Nouzille (5 October 2005). Les Empoisonneurs: Enquête sur ces polluants et produits qui nous tuent à petit feu (in French). Paris: éd. Fayard. ISBN 2-213-62447-X. BnF 40085097..
- Hélène Constanty; Vincent Nouzille (October 2006). Députés sous influence: le vrai pouvoir des lobbies à l'Assemblée nationale (in French). Paris: éd. Fayard. ISBN 2-213-63008-9. BnF 40239462..
- Vincent Nouzille (October 2007). L'Espionne: Virginia Hall, une Américaine dans la guerre (in French). Paris: éd. Fayard. ISBN 978-2-213-62827-1. BnF 41143043.. (Note: Adapted as a TV documentary, L'Espionne qui boîte, directed by Robert Kechichian with a script by Thierry Bourcy and Christine Printemps, production Ladybirds, diffusion France 5, 2012.)
- Two volume work, Des secrets si bien gardés or Dans le secret des présidents :
  - Vincent Nouzille (2009). Des secrets si bien gardés. Les dossiers de la Maison-Blanche et de la CIA sur la France et ses présidents, 1958-1981 (in French). Paris: éd. Fayard. ISBN 978-2-213-63611-5. BnF 41479411.. (Note: Volume 1)
    - Vincent Nouzille (2010). Les dossiers de la CIA sur la France, 1958-1981. Pluriel (in French). Paris: éd. Fayard. ISBN 978-2-8185-0016-3. BnF 42291680.. (Note: Pocket republication under a new title.)
  - Vincent Nouzille (2010). Dans le secret des présidents, CIA, Maison-Blanche, Élysée, les dossiers confidentiels, 1981-2010 (in French). Paris: co-édition éd. Fayard et éd. Les liens qui libèrent. ISBN 978-2-213-65591-8. BnF 42292361.. (Note: Volume 2.)
    - Vincent Nouzille (2012). Les dossiers de la CIA sur la France, 1981-2010. Pluriel (in French). Paris: éd. Fayard. ISBN 978-2-8185-0284-6. BnF 42751065.. (Note: New revised and expanded edition under a new title.)
- Vincent Nouzille (October 2011). La République du copinage (in French). Paris: co-édition éd. Fayard et éd. Les liens qui libèrent. ISBN 978-2-213-66636-5. BnF 42539732.. (Note: The cover quote « enquête sur ces élites qui accaparent le pouvoir » is not on the title page and thus does not form part of the title.)
- Vincent Nouzille (January 2015). Les Tueurs de la République: assassinats et opérations spéciales des services secrets (in French). Paris: éd. Fayard. ISBN 978-2-213-67176-5. BnF 4426161..
- Vincent Nouzille, Erreurs fatales, Paris, éd. Fayard, 2017, 384 p. ISBN 978-2-213-69398-9
- Vincent Nouzille, Histoires secrètes. France-Israël, 1948-2018, Les liens qui libèrent, 2018, 446 p.

La France des réseaux

- In 2011 he participated in La France des réseaux, a multimedia magazine on social networks in France, formerly at www.lafrancedesreseaux.com, with a surviving Facebook page.

== Awards ==
- 2023 : Official selection at the Festival du documentaire sur la Justice
