= Alexander Trushnovich =

Russian leader (1893–1954)

Personal details
- Born: 14 December 1893 Adelsberg, Austria-Hungary
- Died: 13 April 1954 (aged 60) West Berlin, West Germany
- Cause of death: Choked to death during kidnapping attempt
- Party: National Alliance of Russian Solidarists
- Other political affiliations: Committee for Aid to Russian Refugees

Alexander Rudolfovich Trushnovich (Slovene: Aleksander Trušnovič; 14 December 1893, Adelsberg, Austria-Hungary — 13 April 1954, West Berlin, FRG) was a prominent figure in the Russian émigré community; a Slovene by birth and a Catholic who converted to Orthodoxy, he was a leader of the National Alliance of Russian Solidarists and chairman of the Committee for Aid to Russian Refugees. A pan-slavic advocate, he was assassinated by Soviet agents.

== Early life ==
He was born into the family of a railway employee in Slovenia, then part of Austria-Hungary. He took an interest in Russian culture from childhood; according to his memoirs, his love for Russia was shaped by his grandfather's stories. Alexander graduated from a German Gymnasium in Gorizia (a city now divided into the Slovenian town of Nova Gorica and the Italian town of Gorizia) and subsequently studied at the medical faculty of the University of Vienna and the literature faculty in Florence.

During World War I, in an attempt to reach Russia, he voluntarily enlisted in the Austro-Hungarian army, insisting on being sent to the front. In June 1915, in the Carpathians, he—along with many other Slavic soldiers—defected to the Russian Army at great personal risk.

=== In Russia ===
After a brief period in Russian captivity, he petitioned Emperor Nicholas II for permission to serve at the front and subsequently joined the Serbian Volunteer Division. He was severely wounded in the Battle of Kokardja and hospitalized in Yekaterinoslav. There, he met his future wife, who was working as a nurse. He was awarded the Serbian Order of the White Eagle. In July 1917, he secured a transfer to General Kornilov’s 8th Army and saw combat. During the summer of 1917, he served in the Kornilov Shock Regiment. The Czech company under Trushnovich’s command remained loyal to General Kornilov following the failure of the Kornilov Affair in August 1917, guarding him against potential attack until his departure for Bykhov.

=== Participation in the White Movement ===
As part of the Armed Forces of South Russia (AFSR) during the Civil War, he commanded a machine-gun company of the Kornilov Regiment. In April 1919, after contracting typhus, he was evacuated from Novorossiysk to Italy, where he was arrested. Upon his release, he traveled via Serbia, Bulgaria, and Constantinople back to Russia—specifically to Taganrog—to rejoin the 3rd Kornilov Regiment. In the spring of 1920, he was captured by the Reds but escaped and wandered through southern Russia.

=== Life in Soviet Russia ===
Before entering the institute, he changed his surname to his mother’s maiden name—Gostysha (Slovene: Gostíša)—which he used until he left the USSR. He studied at the Krasnodar Medical Institute. From 1927 to 1934, he worked as a physician in the stanitsa (Cossack village) of Primorsko-Akhtarskaya, and later in Tajikistan.

=== Emigration ===
In 1934, as a former subject of Austria-Hungary, he arranged—through the Polish embassy in the USSR—for himself and his family to leave for Yugoslavia; he settled in Belgrade. He joined the National Alliance of Russian Solidarists (NTS) and worked as a physician. In 1937, his book Old and New Russia was published.

In late 1944, he left for Germany, where he served as assistant chief of the medical department for the armed forces of the Committee for the Liberation of the Peoples of Russia. In April 1945, he was taken prisoner by the Allied French army while trying establish contact between the RLA and anti-communist guerrillas in Yugoslavia. In May 1945, he managed to avoid forced repatriation to the USSR. He settled in West Germany.

== Death ==
On 13 April 1954, Trushnovich—then chairman of the Committee for Aid to Russian Refugees—was abducted by Soviet agents. As later came to light, he put up a fierce struggle and was delivered to the Soviet side already "showing no signs of life." Following his abduction, a campaign was begun in order to try to release Trushnovich, which included several influential American citizens and was submitted to the United Nations Human Rights Commission, along with the case of defected assassin Nikolai Khokhlov. The Soviet High Commission representative in Berlin, S. A. Dengin, declined to "release" Trushnovich. The abduction and murder of Trushnovich were acknowledged by the press bureau of the Foreign Intelligence Service only after the collapse of the USSR.

In 1992, the papers found on the deceased were returned to his son, Yaroslav, along with copies of the medical examination report and the burial certificate. The exact burial site of Trushnovich has not been established.
