= Fédération des contribuables =

- Formation: 1928
- Type: Professional association
- Headquarters: France
- Location: France
- Publication: L'Action contribuable Le Réveil du contribuable

The National Federation of Taxpayers (FNC) or the National Federation of Taxpayer Syndicates and Groups is an assembly of taxpayer syndicates founded in 1928 by Louis-Alphonse Large, an accountant, and presided over by Baron Albert d'Anthouard de Wasservas, a retired diplomat, and later by the industrialist Jacques Lemaigre Dubreuil. The group is often mistakenly referred to as the "League of Taxpayers".

== History ==
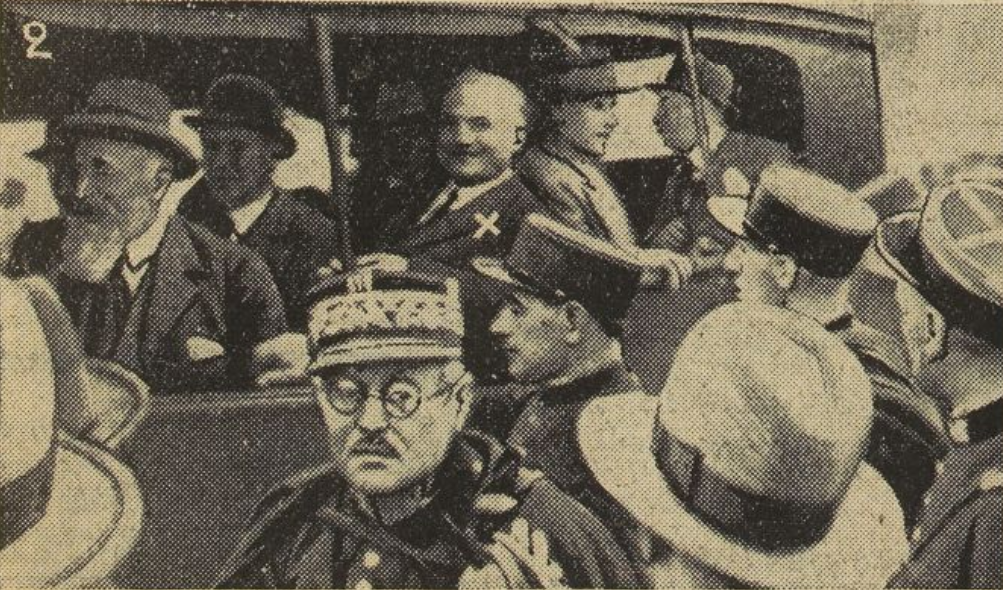
Louis-Alphonse Large, general delegate of the National Federation of Taxpayers, taken into custody (Excelsior, October 24, 1933).

Its founding was supported by groups representing farmers, architects, shop owners and shareholders. It attracted numerous professional associations, trade unions, and groups of liberal professions.

The FNC did not openly conflict with public authorities and presented itself as "a body for monitoring and controlling government actions without particular hostility towards it". However, the worsening economic crisis in 1931 and the victory of the second Cartel des Gauches in 1932 radicalized its rhetoric. From that point, the FNC opposed any tax increase or form of inflation, advocated for reduced public spending, and accused radical and socialist parliamentarians of squandering public funds.

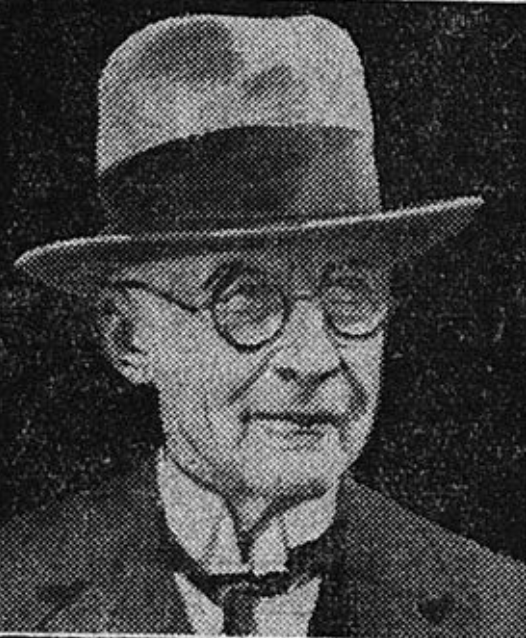
Baron d'Anthouard de Wasservas, president of the National Federation of Taxpayers (Le Matin, February 6, 1933).

In February 1933, the federation organized protests outside prefectures and urged its local syndicates to close businesses. On March 19, 1933, it held a National Taxpayer Day to protest "fiscal and statist plunder," coinciding with several demonstrations. Police recorded 100,000 demonstrators across 46 cities, especially in western and Parisian regions. Paradoxically, this radicalization weakened the FNC's integration into the larger representative organizations of economic interests.

The FNC was involved in the riot of February 6, 1934 through the participation of its Parisian members and its support for calls to protest.

In 1935, the FNC was presided over by Jacques Lemaigre Dubreuil, a shareholder of the Société Générale des Huiles de Pétrole and managing director of Lesieur Oils.

During the summer of 1936, shareholders of the Banque de France grouped under the Association des porteurs d'action de la Banque de France (APABF) allied with the FNC. Jacques Lemaigre Dubreuil was a candidate for the general council representing shareholders. He filed a lawsuit against Vincent Auriol, the minister of finance, for fraud to publicize his candidacy. He was elected and actively opposed Émile Labeyrie, Governor of the Bank of France, and Vincent Auriol during the Popular Front government.

== Ideology ==
The FNC aimed to symbolically represent taxpayers, who were theoretically already represented by parliamentarians. It sought "to substitute Parliament in defending taxpayer interests and negotiating with the Ministry of Finance". To achieve this, it advocated regime change and promoted the salvation of the petite bourgeoisie through tax strikes and street pressure. The direct action strategy led by Louis-Alphonse Large placed the FNC among violent groups.

== Membership ==
The FNC claimed 400,000 members in 1931 and 700,000 in 1934. Its decision-making bodies were composed of merchants, lawyers, notaries, and property owners.

== External Relations ==
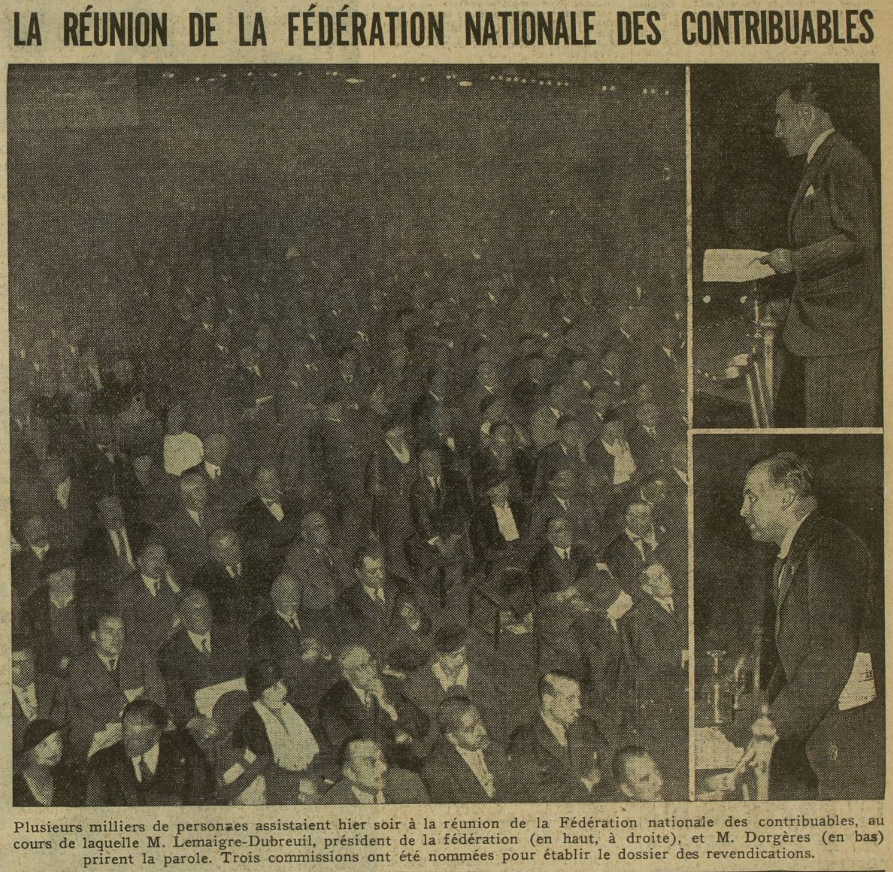
Speech by Jacques Lemaigre Dubreuil and Henri Dorgères at a meeting of the National Federation of Taxpayers (Excelsior, October 10, 1935).

In 1930, the FNC established ties with Henri Dorgères' Comités de défense paysanne.

The Camelots du Roi of the Action Française supported security at some meetings. While serving as FNC president, Jacques Lemaigre Dubreuil established connections with La Cagoule and also funded L'Insurgé.

The left wing historian Annie Lacroix-Riz claims that the federation was a member of the Comité national d'entente économique (National Committee for Economic Agreement), which grouped major French economic, industrial, property and agricultural interests.

== Press ==
- L'Action contribuable
- Le Réveil du contribuable, a monthly published in Paris.

== Bibliography ==
- William A. Hoisington Jr. (1973). Taxpayer Revolt in France. The National Taxpayers' Federation, 1928-1939. Stanford: Hoover Institution Press.
