= Jacques Follorou =

French journalist for Le Monde

- Born: 1967
- Occupation: Journalist

Jacques Follorou (born 1967) is a French journalist for Le Monde. He is the author of several books, including three about organized crime in Corsica.

== Biography ==
A former student at the Centre de formation des journalistes (class of 1991), Jacques Follorou began his career in 1993, working as a freelancer for Le Canard enchaîné and its quarterly publication, les dossiers du Canard enchaîné. In 1994 and 1995, he contributed to the publication of information on the real estate assets of Jacques Chirac, Alain Juppé and Jean Tiberi, as well as on the discretionary allocation of apartments by the City of Paris. At the beginning of 1996, he discovered the Corsican nationalism when he took part in the Canard enchaîné's dossier on the island, which was then in the midst of a fratricidal war between nationalist groups.

In 1996, he joined the general news department of Le Monde, where he worked on legal cases, particularly those relating to the financing of political parties and international corruption. In particular, he was the source of information published on the “Ile-de-France region high schools” affair, whose vast construction program enabled the main French political parties to finance themselves illegally for ten years, as well as on the embezzlement of funds from The MNEF Affair(MNEF) and the financial abuses of Crédit Lyonnais.

On February 6, 1998, following the assassination of Prefect Claude Érignac in Ajaccio, he was also asked to follow National Liberation Front of Corsica, the Erignac inquiry and, in 1999, the drift of his successor, Prefect Bernard Bonnet, for Le Monde. From 2000 onwards, he extended his investigations into the island's criminal power and its hold on the local economy and democracy. His work continues to this day, as he strives to define the specific nature of the Corsican mafia phenomenon.

At the end of 2001, in the wake of the September 11 attacks in New York and Washington, he broadened his investigative work to include questions of terrorist financing and, more broadly, financial investigation within Le Monde's economics department.

In early 2008, he joined Le Monde's international service, where he covered Afghanistan and Pakistan, specializing in terrorism and Intelligence assessment.

In 2013, he became the exclusive contact in France for American lawyer and activist Glenn Greenwald, to whom Edward Snowden, the former National Security Agency (NSA) contractor, entrusted his archives. This marked the start of a direct dialogue with the American whistleblower and the beginning of an investigation into the surveillance system created by France, which remained unknown until the revelations of Le Monde, between 2013 and 2015, were confirmed by the President of the Republic, François Hollande, in April 2015.

Since then, Jacques Follorou has continued his investigations into the world of intelligence, contributing in particular to the revelations, in 2018 and 2019, about Russian espionage interference in Europe.He covers terrorist attacks on French soil and abroad. At the same time, in June 2013, he travels to the Sahel, notably to Kidal, Mali. In August 2014, he left for Kurdistan Region to cover clashes between Kurds and the Islamic State (EI). In May 2017, he visited North Korea.

== Works ==
- Follorou, Jacques (1999). Corse : l'Etat bafoué. Paris: Stock. ISBN 9782234051850. OCLC 44670485.
- Follorou, Jacques; Vichnievsky, Laurence (2002). Sans instructions. Paris: Stock. ISBN 9782234054363. OCLC 422144788.
- Follorou, Jacques; Nouzille, Vincent (2004). Les parrains corses. Paris: Fayard. ISBN 9782213617596. OCLC 418390622.
- Follorou, Jacques (2008). Bérégovoy : le dernier secret. Paris: Fayard. ISBN 9782213634265. OCLC 226166590.
- Follorou, Jacques; Prévost-Desprez, Isabelle [in French] (2010). Une juge à abattre. Paris: Librairie Arthème Fayard. ISBN 9782213643168. OCLC 690777687.
- Follorou, Jacques; Legorjus, Philippe (2011). Ouvéa, la république et la morale. Paris: Plon. ISBN 9782259217064. OCLC 760990229.
- Follorou, Jacques (2013). La guerre des parrains corses. Paris: Flammarion. ISBN 9782081254916. OCLC 835314889.
- Follorou, Jacques (2014). Démocraties sous contrôle : la victoire posthume d'Oussama Ben Laden. Paris: CNRS. ISBN 9782271082985. OCLC 897125736.
