= Georges Lesieur =

French businessman (1848-1931)

Georges Lesieur (1848–1931), born in Paris (France), was a French businessman and founder of the brand of edible oils of the same name (Huiles Lesieur). He married Esther Dupuis with whom he had five children. Lesieur was born into a family of farmers based in Septeuil (Yvelines department), a city of which his father was the Mayor.

== Career at Desmarais Frères ==
Lesieur started working at the age of 15 as a shop assistant for Desmarais Frères (DF), an industrial company specialized in purification and distribution of vegetal oils for lighting purposes. DF later oriented its activity towards petroleum - originally used for lighting as well - to eventually become one of the major actors on that Market. He became co-manager of DF before turning 30 and actively contributed to its development for more than 40 years.

He joined the Paris Chamber of Commerce in 1895 to become, from 1901 to 1903 its treasurer, from 1903 to 1904 its vice president and its president from 1905 to 1907. From 1900, Lesieur was the president of the administrative commission at HEC Paris.

== Birth of the Lesieur brand ==
Disagreeing with DF for family reasons (the Desmarais brothers refused to welcome his sons into the Company), Lesieur resigned in 1908 at the age of 60 and decided to start his own business, using his own assets and funds. Supported by his three sons Maurice, Paul and Henri, as well as three former colleagues from Desmarais Frères, he built his first factory in Coudekerque. The plant was operational in 1910 under the name of Huileries Georges Lesieur. The geographical choice of Coudekerque was made because the Desmarais plants were already installed in Le Havre and L'Huilerie Marseillaise was based in the South of France. Setting up in the neighbourhood of Dunkerque - third largest port in France for the import of groundnuts after Marseille and Bordeaux - became a natural conclusion.

== Bibliography ==
- Tristan Gaston Breton, Lesieur, une marque dans l'histoire, Perrin, 1998.
- Christian Rouxel, D'Azur à Total - Desmarais Frères, Le Premier Grand Pétrolier Français, Drivers, 2007.
- Boutillier, Sophie (2011). L'aventure des entrepreneurs. Dimitri Uzunidis (2e éd ed.). Levallois-Perret: Studyrama. ISBN 978-2-7590-1168-1. OCLC 717782077.
