= Dimitri Uzunidis =

Franco-Greek economist

- Born: 1960 (age 65–66)
- Occupations: Economist, Author, Adademic

Dimitri Uzunidis (Greek: Δημήτρης Ουζουνίδης; born 1960) is Director of the Research Unit on Industry and Innovation (Lab. RII), University of Littoral Côte d'Opale, France and Technical University of Crete, Greece.

== Biography ==
He was born in 1960, and studied journalism, economics and sociology. He began studying at Paris 13 university and finished at Paris 10 university. He obtained his PhD in economics in 1987 on the following subject : Access to technology for developing countries. Negotiation capacity and national scientific potential under professor François Chesnais tutorship. The PhD was updated and published in 1994.

After having worked in various international and Hellenic institutions (Ministry of Industry and the Economy), Dimitri Uzunidis was named as an associate professor in 1992 at the new University of Littoral Côte d’Opale (Dunkirk, France). He participated in the establishment of this university, where he founded and managed the Research Unit on Industry and Innovation (Lab.RII). A specialist in the international political economics of innovation, he currently teaches in some French and Greek universities and he is also associate professor at Seattle University (United States).

Dimitri Uzunidis has published and edited many books on international economics and on economics of innovation (see the list below). The research he has developed with Sophie Boutillier on the entrepreneur and the dynamics of capitalism has given rise in some major publications at the international level.

Dimitri Uzunidis has also significant responsibilities in the scientific edition sector, he is the editor of international journals: Innovations, Cahiers d'économie de l'innovation and Journal of Innovation Economics. These two journals in French and English language are published by De Boeck and Cairn. He is also director of publication of the series Marché et organisations and L’esprit économique at L’Harmattan.

Dimitri Uzunidis is currently President of the Research Network on Innovation.

== Some publications ==
His publications include:

- Mondialisation et citoyenneté, L’Harmattan, Paris, 1999 (dir.)
- La femme et l’industriel, coll. Economie et Innovation, L’Harmattan, Paris, 2000 (with R. Bellais, S. Boutillier, B. Laperche)
- L’innovation et l’économie contemporaine, Espaces cognitifs et territoriaux, coll. Economie, société, région, De Boeck, Brussels, 2004
- Travailler au XXIe siècle. Nouveaux modes d'organisation du travail, Collection: Économie, Société, Région, Editions De Boeck, Brussels, 2005 (ed. with S. Boutillier)
- John Kenneth Galbraith and the Future of Economics, Palgrave MacMillan, London, 2005 (ed. with B. Laperche)
- Innovation, Evolution And Economic Change. New Ideas in the Tradition of Galbraith (ed. with J.K. Galbraith et B. Laperche, ed.), E. Elgar, Cheltenham, 2006
- La gouvernance de l’innovation, marché et organisations, L’Harmattan, Paris, 2007
- Méthodologie de la thèse et du mémoire (with Sophie Boutillier, A. Goguel d'Allondans and N. Labère), Studyrama, 2007 (der. edition)
- L'économie russe depuis 1990, De Boeck, Brussels, 2008 (ed. with S. Boutillier and I. Peaucelle).
- Genesis of Innovation. Systemic Linkages between Knowledge and Market, E. Elgar, Cheltenham, 2008 (ed. with B. Laperche and N. von Tunzelmann)
- Powerful Finance and Innovation Trends in a high-risk Economy, Palgrave MacMillan, 2008 (ed. with B. Laperche)
- Gouvernance. Exercices de pouvoir, Marché et Organisations, n°9, L’Harmattan, Paris, 2009 (ed. with S. Callens)
