= Wolfgang Salus =

Personal details
- Born: 29 June 1909 Prague, Austria-Hungary
- Died: 5 March 1953 (aged 43) Munich, West Germany
- Cause of death: Poisoned by KGB
- Party: Independent Workers' Party of Germany
- Parent: Hugo Salus (father)

Wolfgang Václav Salus (29 June 1909, Prague – 5 March 1953, Munich) was a Czechoslovak Trotskyist and poet of German descent. He was assassinated in an operation carried out by the MGB of the USSR.

== Biography ==
He was born into the family of the physician and writer Hugo Salus and was friends with the ethnographer and poet Franz Baermann Steiner. In 1924, he joined the Young Communist League, and in 1927, he visited Moscow as a delegate for communist youth. There, he made contact with the Left Opposition.

From 1929 to 1933, he worked as a secretary to Leon Trotsky on the Turkish island of Büyükada; later, he served as the chairman of the Trotskyist group in Prague and as an editor of the journal Iskra. Following the occupation of Czechoslovakia, the Nazis sent him to the Auschwitz and Buchenwald concentration camps, but he managed to survive.

In 1948, after the Communists came to power in Czechoslovakia, he left the country and helped establish the German section of the Fourth International in Munich. In 1951, he participated in founding the Independent Workers' Party of Germany—a left-socialist party that supported Titoist Yugoslavia.

On February 13, 1953, he was poisoned in Munich with a slow-acting toxin; he died during the night of March 4–5, 1953, and pneumonia was initially presumed to be the cause of death. The perpetrator was Otto Freitag, a former Nazi officer, who allegedly stepped on Zalus's foot by accident using a shoe fitted with a poisoned spike. The CPSU leadership—Georgy Malenkov, Lavrentiy Beria, Vyachezlav Molotov, Nikolai Bulganin, and Nikita Khrushchev—was informed in detail about this assassination. A report by S. D. Ignatyev dated March 8, 1953 (No. 951/I), stated that Zalus had been poisoned by an MGB agent who administered a special substance that caused death after 10–12 days. "The poisoning of Zalus aroused no suspicion on the part of the adversary," the report wrote. It was not until 1992 that an investigation by journalist Natalia Gevorkyan revealed the true circumstances of his death.
