= Farhat Hached =

Tunisian trade unionist

Farhat Hached فرحات حشاد
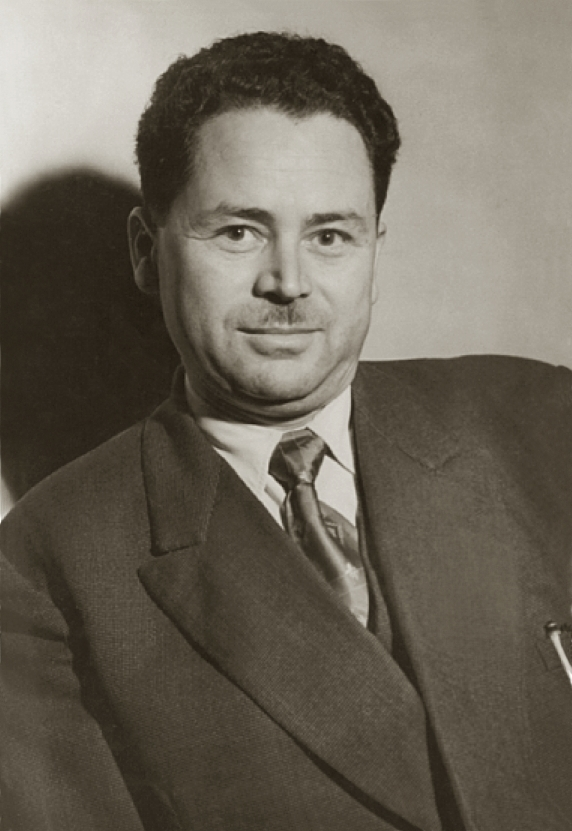
- Farhat Hached

Personal details
- Born: February 2, 1914 El Abassia, Kerkennah Islands, French Tunisia
- Died: December 5, 1952 (aged 38) The roadside near Radès, French Tunisia
- Profession: Trades Union Leader; Independence Movement leader

Farhat Hached (Arabic: فرحات حشاد; 2 February 1914 – 5 December 1952) was a Tunisian labor unionist and activist who was assassinated by La Main Rouge, a French terrorist organization operated by French foreign intelligence. He was one of the leaders of the pro-independence Tunisian national movement, along with Habib Bourguiba and Salah ben Youssef. More recently, on 18 December 2009, it was confirmed to the Al Jazeera news organisation by a man called Antoine Méléro, who claimed to be a former La Main Rouge member, that La Main Rouge had been a military wing of the French Service de Documentation Extérieure et de Contre-Espionnage (External Documentation and Counter-Espionage Service) or SDECE.

== Life ==
=== Early years ===
Farhat Hached was born at El Abassia on the Islands of Kerkennah, the son of Mohamed Hached, a sailor, and Hana Ben Romdhane. He spent eight years at the village primary school in Kellabine which was run by a French head teacher. He received his Certificate of Primary Education which might have opened the way to further education, but his father's death obliged him to abandon his studies and take on paid work.

In 1930 he took a job as a courier with "la Société du transport du Sahel", a transport company based at Sousse. In the same year he established a basic trades union at the company which he affiliated to the French Trades Union Confederation (CGT). This was the start of his career in Tunisian trades unionism. He took on a range of union responsibilities locally and in the region and, later, in national administration, working with Albert Bouzanquet. As a result, he was dismissed from his job in 1939.

During the Second World War, with Tunisia subject to the French puppet government at Vichy, a ban on political and trades union activity made life difficult. Hached therefore volunteered for work with the Red Cross in order to look after the injured, a task which he undertook outside his working hours. In 1942 Tunisia became a significant theatre for the fighting between principal wartime belligerents and the requirements of the Vichy government lost their significance as local administrative responsibilities passed to the Free French colonial government. In 1943 Hached was recruited for government service which meant relocation to Sfax where he was able to resume his trades union activities. The same year he married a kinswoman from Kerkennah, Oum El Khir (Emna Hached).

=== Trades union leader ===
"I do not think his bitterest enemy would ever deny the sympathetic force of his personality: "Ferhat ... the gentleman bandit". He is a stocky man, who greets you with hand outstretched and laughing blue eyes, set in a round face of fair complexion. The high pitched voice from this vigorous man with the thick neck of a wrestler comes as a surprise. A little red moustache, cut short, accentuates the resemblance to a western trades union leader."

"Je ne crois pas qu'aucun de ses adversaires les plus acharnés lui ait jamais dénié la force de sympathie : « Ferhat, m'a dit un vieux dignitaire du Maghzen, ah ! le bandit, qu'il est gentil... » C'est un homme trapu qui vous accueille, la main tendue, le regard bleu et rieur dans un visage rond au teint clair. La voix aigüe surprend chez cet homme vigoureux à l'encolure de lutteur. Une petite moustache rousse, coupée court, accentue le type occidental du leader syndicaliste."

Jean Lacouture
- journalist, historian and biographer, writing in 1952, a few months before Hached's assassination

As war in Europe continued, at the departmental congress of the CGT in March 1944, recognising the inability of the leadership in "Metropolitan France" to respond appropriately to the needs of workers in Tunisia, and disappointed by the failure of communists and socialists within it to support "the legitimate aspirations of Tunisians for national independence", he broke with the CGT. In November 1944, with other Tunisian trades unionists, he took the initiative to launch an autonomous Tunisian trades union, starting with the "Union of Free Trades Unionists in the South" ("Union des syndicats libres du Sud") based in Sfax. The focus was on three priorities: social justice, equality between Tunisian workers and those of French provenance, and national independence. In 1945 he established, in addition, the "Union of Free Trades Unionists in the North" ("Union des syndicats libres du Nord"), based in Tunis.

On 20 January 1946 a joint congress took place at which the "Union of Free Trades Unionists in the South", the "Union of Free Trades Unionists in the North" and the "General Tunisian Labour Union" ("Fédération générale tunisienne du travail") which had been founded back in 1936, combined together to form the Tunisian General Labour Union ("Union Générale Tunisienne du Travail" / UGTT). In 1947, still aged only 32, Hached was unanimously elected as the first General Secretary of the UGTT.

From the start, for Farhat Hached the Tunisian trades union movement was an integral part of the struggle for independence. Autonomous and independent, it was an important and dependable pillar for the nationalist project, defined and directed by the Neo Destour "party." The strikes, demonstrations and street protests in support of independence intensified from 1946, in parallel with demands for improvements in living and working conditions for Tunisians. The UGTT, directed by Hached, played a central role in triggering and choreographing episodes of unrest and in radicalising popular demands. In 1949 the UGTT signed up to the newly created International Confederation of Free Trade Unions (ICFTU), and Hached joined the executive committee of the international body, building up international contacts within the US/western oriented labour organisation at a succession of meetings within and beyond north Africa.

At the fourth congress of the UGTT, in March 1951, Hached provided an account of its achievements after five years under his leadership. Almost 120,000 members, from all sectors and from all regions of the country, had joined the national organisation. A real grass roots guerilla movement was being conducted against the French colonial administration. According to Hached, the UGTT had already won from the colonialists important civil rights and guarantees for Tunisian society as a whole. Furthermore, joining the ICFTU in 1949 ensured a global voice for the UGTT. Beyond that, the construction of a regional trades union federation for north Africa was a priority for Hached, to embrace embryonic union movements in Algeria and Morocco, and create independent trades unions in Libya that could establish appropriate union structures there. Finally, with its social and economic programmes, along with its precepts on freedoms and liberties, the UGTT provided the nationalist movement with a coherent national agenda for the post liberation era.

=== National leader ===
In 1952 direct negotiations between the French and Tunisian governments broke down. Repression followed. Habib Bourguiba and the other leaders of the nationalist movement were arrested. Salah ben Youssef, the Tunisian Minister of Justice, was sent by the Tunisian government to the United Nations with a request for statehood: he barely escaped arrest and deportation. On 26 March 1952 M'hamed Chenik and other leaders of the protectorate government were arrested. The French imposed a curfew and a ban on all political activity, while the Foreign Legion conducted mass arrests.

In this context of crisis the UGTT found itself in the front line of political and armed resistance against the French protectorate authorities. It retained a level of protection for trades union legislation and from the support of the ICFTU, the labour movement in the US and the Democratic Party, which at this time held power in the United States. As leader of the Labour Union and thereby head of the anti-colonial resistance, Hached secretly organised groups of activists in the regional trades union offices, to head up armed attacks against symbols of French authority. He also led strike actions. The French reacted aggressively, with more than 20,000 trades unionists arrested and placed in prison and concentration camps.

In April 1952 Hached travelled to Brussels and New York City under the auspices of the ICFTU in order to represent the voice of Tunisians when Moroccan and Tunisian issues were discussed by the United Nations Security Council. The French government felt obliged to come up with a new reform plan. Hached suggested that the Bey of Tunis should convene a council of forty people representing Tunisian opinions that should study the French plan and present an opinion of it on 2 August: the suggestion was rejected, however.

=== Assassination ===
==== Threats ====
"With Ferhat Hached and Bourguiba we have identified two of the leading guilty men. We could unmask others - all the other highly placed ones - if necessary. We need an end to this ridiculous game, not with words but with actions, and not just to punish the "little guys", given that those truly responsible are known, and their names are on everyone's lips. Yes, we need to put an end to it: it's about the life of the French, and the honour and prestige of France. "If a man threatens to kill you, hit him on the head", says a Syrian proverb. Today it is necessary to strike. For as long as this manly liberating gesture remains unaccomplished, you will not have done your duty in the sight of God, and innocent blood will be on your own hands."

"Avec Ferhat Hached et Bourguiba, nous vous avons présenté deux des principaux coupables. Nous en démasquerons d'autres, s'il est nécessaire, tous les autres, si haut placés soient-ils. Il faut, en effet, en finir avec ce jeu ridicule qui consiste à ne parler que des exécutants, à ne châtier que les « lampistes » du crime, alors que les vrais coupables sont connus et que leurs noms sont sur toutes les lèvres. Oui, il faut en finir, car il y va de la vie des Français, de l'honneur et du prestige de la France. « Si un homme menace de te tuer, frappe-le à la tête » dit un proverbe syrien. C'est là qu'il faut frapper aujourd'hui. Tant que vous n'aurez pas accompli ce geste viril, ce geste libérateur, vous n'aurez pas rempli votre devoir et, devant Dieu qui vous regarde, le sang des innocents retombera sur vous

"Paris", December 1952
- weekly North African news magazine for the colonist community, controlled by Camille Aymard

Farhat Hached was marked out because of the danger he represented to the colonial interests in Tunisia and across North Africa more generally. Various departments and agencies of French Intelligence started, in October 1952, to draw up proposals: he could be removed from Tunisian territory, imprisoned, placed under house arrest or murdered. During the next couple of months he became subject to permanent surveillance and there was a proliferation of threatening tracts and leaflets emanating from La Main Rouge ("The Red Hand"). There were also physical threats against his home and family. Calls for Hached's murder became more insistent.

==== Ambush ====
On the morning of 5 December 1952 an ambush operation was implemented to eliminate Hached. He was followed by a car as he left Radès, the suburb of Tunis where he lived. Machine guns were fired at him from the car which then drove off at high speed. Hached sustained injuries to a shoulder and a hand, but was able to get out of his car. A few moments later a second car appeared carrying three men: observing that he was still alive they approached him and shot him in the head, before depositing his body beside the road less than a kilometer away.

The announcement of his death on the radio at midday triggered protests across the country, along with demonstrations in Casablanca, Cairo, Damascus, Beirut, Karachi Djakarta, Milan, Brussels and Stockholm. The socialist publication "Nord-Matin" reported "bloody riots in Casablanca. 40 dead and many injured. After the assassination of Farhat Hached and the blunders of the governor, unrest spreads to Algeria and Morocco". ("Émeutes sanglantes à Casablanca. 40 morts et nombreux blessés. Après l'assassinat de Farhat Hached et les maladresses du résident, les troubles s'étendent à l'Algérie et au Maroc "). The French liberal establishment rushed into print to denounce the assassination in newspaper articles, public declarations, petitions and demonstrations. Prominent among these were Daniel Guérin, Roger Stéphane, Claude Bourdet David Rousset, René Louzon, Alain Savary and Charles-André Julien.

Hached's 22 year old widow was left with four children: Noureddine (8), Naceur (5), Jamila (3) and Samira (6 months).

==== Body ====
His body was transported on a boat from the little port of La Goulette to Kerkennah to be handed over to his family. Eventually, in 1955, the body was taken to Tunis and placed in a mausoleum constructed in the kasbah, on the spot that during his life he would harangue the crowds.

For 2002, which marked the fiftieth anniversary of the assassination, a new mausoleum was constructed to accommodate his remains. The anniversary was celebrated annually until 2012 every 5 December by the Tunisian president and representatives of important institutions and corporations and of his family.

== Legacy ==
Hached's assassination led to rioting throughout much of North Africa. France could not resist growing nationalism in Tunisia, with independence effective in 1956.
