= La Main Rouge =

French intelligence agency

La Main Rouge (English: The Red Hand) was a French terrorist organization operated by the French foreign intelligence agency Service de Documentation Extérieure et de Contre-Espionnage (External Documentation and Counter-Espionage Service), or SDECE, in the 1950s. Its purpose was to eliminate the supporters of Algerian independence and the leading members of the Front de Libération Nationale (FLN) during the Algerian War, but they eventually included anticolonial activists from other countries of the Maghreb.

In particular, the apparent inaction of the French authorities was seen abroad as a tacit admission by the French government that it had caused the aggressive crackdown on supporters of the FLN.

== Activities ==
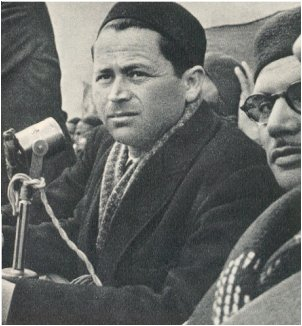
The 1952 assassination of Tunisian labor unionist and activist Farhat Hached is attributed to La Main Rouge.

The assassination of the Tunisian labor unionist and independence activist Farhat Hached on December 5, 1952 is attributed to La Main Rouge.

On 11 June 1955, members of the organisation shot and killed in Casablanca French businessman and activist Jacques Lemaigre-Dubreuil, CEO of the company Lesieur and supporter of the Moroccan independence.

Several bomb attacks took place in West Germany, like the assassination attempts on the arms dealer Otto Schlüter on 26 September 1956 and 3 June 1957, and the killing of Georg Puchert (alias Captain Morris), another German arms dealer, on 3 March 1959. These cases would ultimately never be solved.

On 27 November 1959, 30-year-old Christian Durieux gave an interview in which he claimed the attempts against the lives of Schlüter and Puchert and the bomb attack in the port of Hamburg against the cargo ship Atlas on 1 October 1958, were all carried out on behalf of La Main Rouge. He also claimed responsibility for the assassination of FLN official Améziane Aït Ahcène in Bonn, in November 1958.

The ambassador of the Algerian FLN in West Germany, the above mentioned Aït Ahcène, was shot from a moving car on November 5, 1958 in Bonn and died months later in a Tunisian hospital. The attack is attributed to La Main Rouge.

The freighters Typhon in Tanger on 18 July 1957, Emma, en route from Tangier to Gibraltar the following 30 July, and Alkaira, in Ostend on 13 April 1959, were destroyed by explosive charges planted by La Main Rouge.

== See also ==
- Front Algérie Française - French militant organization supporting French Algeria
- State terrorism
- La Cagoule - French terrorist organization
- Organisation armée secrète - French dissident terrorist organisation in the Algerian War

== Bibliography ==
- Helmut Roewer, Stefan Schäfer, Matthias Uhl: Lexikon of the intelligence services in the 20th century. Herbig, Munich 2003, ISBN 3-7766-2317-9.
- Subchapters: Against West Germany, in: Matthias Ritzi/Erich Schmidt-Eenboom: In the shadow of the Third Reich. The BND and his agent Richard Christmann, Berlin (Ch. Links Verlag) 2011, S. 186-200 ISBN 978-3-86153-643-7
- Pierre Genève: La main rouge, Paris (Éd. Nord-Sud) in 1960.
- Antoine Méléro: La main rouge. L ' Armée secrète de la République, Paris (ed. du Rocher) 1997 ISBN 226802699X
- Claus Leggewie: Porter. The Algeria project of the left in the Adenauer Germany, Berlin (red book publisher) 1984 ISBN 3-88022-286X
- Wolfgang Kraushaar: The protest Chronicle 1949-1959 - an illustrated history of movement, resistance and Utopia. Vol. I-IV. Rogner & Bernhard at Zweitausendeins, Hamburg of 1996 ISBN 3-8077-0350-0.
