= Améziane Aït Ahcène =

Algerian politician

Améziane Aït Ahcène (1931 – 1959) was an Algerian lawyer, FLN politician, and ambassador of the Algerian Front de Libération Nationale in West-Germany. He was shot out of a moving car on November 5, 1958, in Bonn and died months later in a Tunisian hospital.

Améziane Aït Ahcène studied law and was a lawyer in Algeria. He came to Bonn, the capital of West-Germany, as head of the unofficial German Mission of the Algerian Freedom Movement (FLN). On November 5, 1958, Améziane Aït Ahcène was shot down from a moving car outside the Tunisian embassy in Bonn. A burst from a heavy submachine gun, according to Der Spiegel, the weapon used was an 11.9 caliber machine pistol. The attack is attributed to the French state-run terrorist organization of the French secret service SDECE, La Main Rouge.

Améziane Aït Ahcène received medical treatment in Tunis and was subsequently appointed head of the FLN by exiled prime minister Ferhat Abbas. He later died of pulmonary edema in Tunisia due to his injuries.
