= Ali Boumendjel =

Algerian revolutionary and lawyer

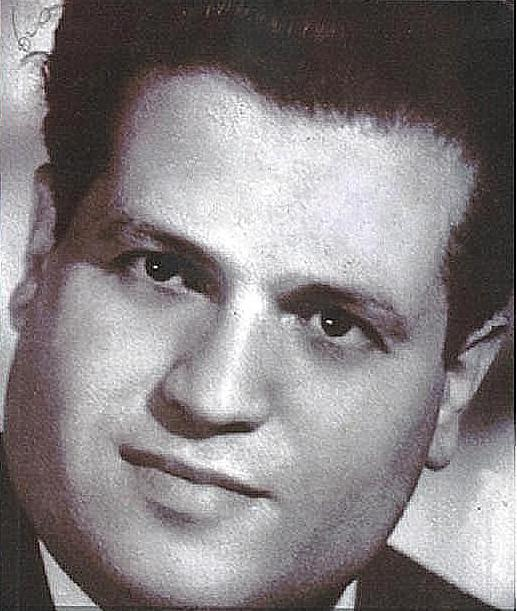
- Ali Boumendjel
- Born: May 24, 1919; Relizane, French Algeria
- Died: March 23, 1957 (aged 37); El Biar, French Algeria
- Cause of death: Execution by falling
- Occupations: Lawyer, journalist

Ali Boumendjel (Arabic: علي بومنجل; 24 May 1919 – 23 March 1957) was an Algerian revolutionary and lawyer.

== Biography ==
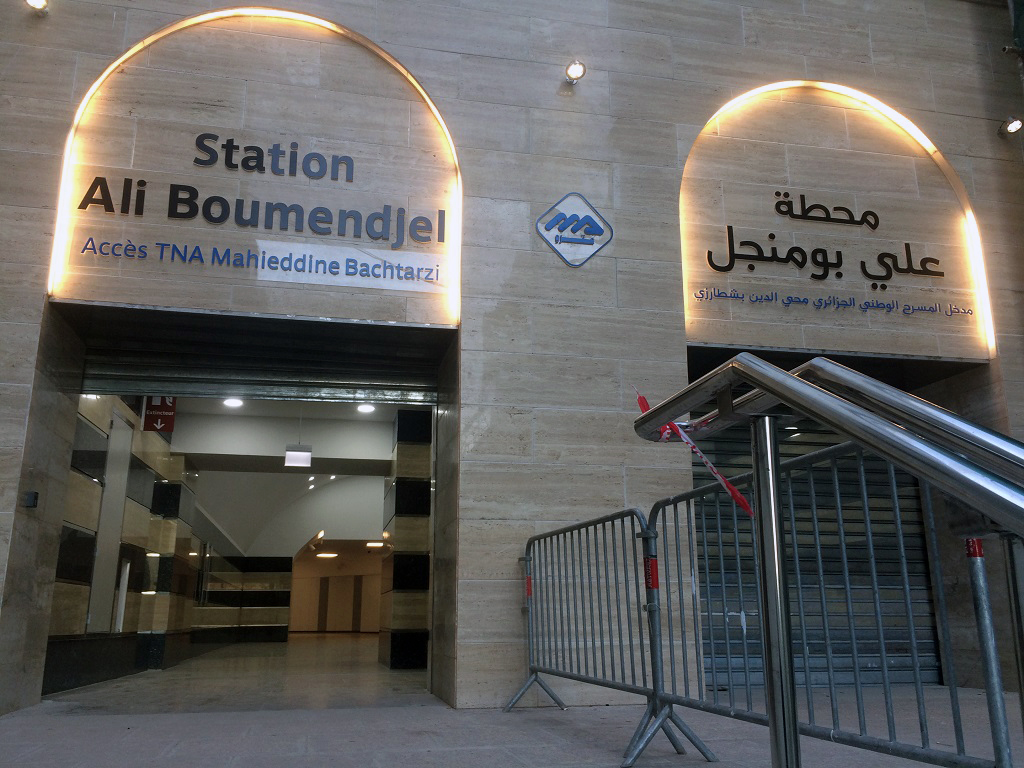
Access Theater from Ali Boumendjel station of the Algiers metro.

Ali Boumendjel was born in Relizane to an educated family from Beni Yenni. He was the younger brother of Ahmed Boumendjel, also a nationalist politician and lawyer who would participate in the negotiations leading up to the Évian Accords. The younger Boumendjel was educated at the Lycée Duveyrier in Blida, where he met with other future figures of the Algerian revolution, such as Abane Ramdane, Benyoucef Benkhedda and Saad Dahlab. He then oriented his career toward law, and became a journalist for the journal Egalité, controlled by the integrationists led by Ferhat Abbas.

Ali studied law and became a lawyer. His political awakening took place during the days of the Popular Front. It was marked by the call for the emancipation of the Algerian Nation launched by Messali Hadj and sensitive to the commitment and communist mobilization in the Muslim Congress. He refused military service in the French Army, which earned him a list of anti-French activities and to be considered a dangerous nationalist.

During the revolution he became, with Jacques Vergès, one of many lawyers working for the Algerian nationalists. In 1955, he joined the National Liberation Front (FLN) with his old friend Abane Ramdane, after Ramdane was released from prison. Ramdane advised Boumendjel to change his professional orientation, so he joined the litigation department of Shell corporation, while still continuing his militantism in the FLN.

Boumendjel was arrested on 9 February 1957, and underwent over a month of torture at the hands of commandant Paul Aussaresses and his men. He was thrown from the sixth floor of a building in El Biar on 23 March; his death was passed off as a suicide. Forty-three years later, in 2000, Aussaresses admitted that Boumendjel had been murdered.

Following the recommendations of the report by historian Benjamin Stora on remembrance of French Algeria, on March 2, 2021, French President Emmanuel Macron recognized that Ali Boumendjel was "tortured and murdered" by the French army. The president received four of Ali Boumendjel's grandchildren to announce to them the recognition, on behalf of France, of his assassination. The press release evokes the confession of Paul Aussaresses to have ordered one of his subordinates to disguise the murder as suicide.

== Tributes ==
A street and a metro station bear his name in Algiers as well as a city in Relizane, his birthplace.

== Bibliography ==
- Malika Rahal (2010). Ali Boumendjel, une affaire française, une histoire algérienne. Paris: Les Belles Lettres. ISBN 978-2251900056.
