= Custom Circus =

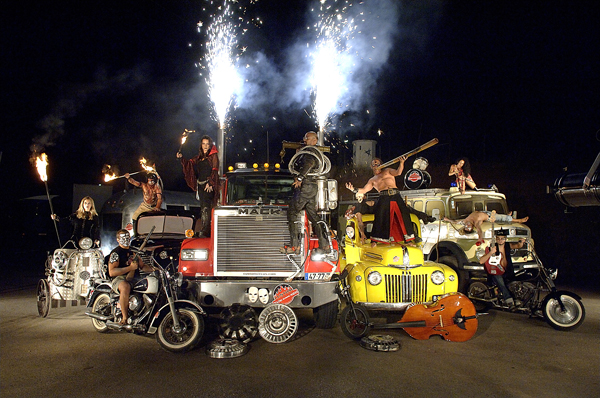
- Custom Circus - Tour 2005

Background information
- Born: 2002 (age 23–24)
- Origin: Portugal
- Genres: Alternative Rock, Blues, Electronic music, Post-Apocalyptic, Cabaret Rock, Steampunk, Gothic Rock, Dark Wave, Industrial music
- Occupations: Transdisciplinary theater, visual arts, literature, industrial archaeology, television
- Years active: 2002–present
- Label: Media Capital - IPlay
- Members: Daniela Sousa, Michel Alex, Rui Gago
- Website: www.customcircus.com

Custom Circus is a Portuguese transdisciplinary theater and visual arts company, officially created in 2002. Constituted as a non-profit cultural association, it operates in the areas of theater, audiovisual productions, cultural events, research and artistic training, areas in which it creates, carries out and produces cultural actions in the fields of arts, cinema, theatre, television and advertising.

Initially, its members traveled in a convoy composed of classic vehicles customized in a post-apocalyptic style, which grew progressively. Maintaining a nomadic genesis in the early years, they later settled in Oeiras, Portugal, and founded the cultural center Nirvana Studios. The activities of this company began in 1992, and with the exception of 1995, it carried out various projects every year until its official foundation in 2002 under the name Custom Circus.

According to João Mendes Rosa, then Head of the Culture and Arts Division of Oeiras Municipality in 2021, this company was one of the most active on spreading the name of Oeiras nationally and internationally, through the promotion of culture.

The company’s headquarters are located in Nirvana Studios, on Estrada Militar, close to the village of Barcarena, municipality of Oeiras. Between 2004 and 2019 alone, Custom Circus performed around 600 shows, having also hosted and supported, annually, dozens of transdisciplinary events, from art to sports, reaching up to this date 15 interactive theater productions, 10 record music albums, dozens of exhibitions and visual art installations, 10 literary publications and other projects.

== History ==
Custom Circus first appeared as a concept and also in the form of characters, in 1988 in a post-apocalyptic fiction novel by author Michel Alex. Four years later, in 1992, the group was formed and began its activities. During this time, two of the founders, Michel Alex and Rui Gago, spent 4 years (between 1988 and 1992) acquiring the company's first exotic vehicles: a 1969 Hanomag Motorhome, two Harley-Davidson motorcycles and a 1957 Oldsmobile hearse station wagon. In 1994, in Lisbon, which at the time was European Capital of Culture, Daniela Sousa joined the duo, professionally integrating the projects. In this Capital of Culture, they mainly worked for Eutaxia - a production company founded and managed by Adolfo Gutkin, contributing in the production of an Avant-garde theater show; this premiere would give rise to the MTM show by La Fura Dels Baus. The trio would be made official in 1996 and to this day they continue to work together. In addition to having performed in 1994 in Lisbon, they also performed in the Expo 98 and in the e no Euro 2004.

Originally the company traveled in a convoy composed of classic or post-apocalyptic vehicles that grew in numbers as the years passed. Their genesis was mostly nomadic before they founded the cultural center Nirvana Studios. This convoy was composed of people of various nationalities and trends, from Bikers, Punks, Goths, Hippies, among others, who supported themselves through tours and shows on the road. In 1996, a production company called Nirvana Produções was created, which dealt with the creation and performance of cultural and corporate events for other companies. Also in this same year, the group designed and held the Lisbon Grand Meeting, which was the first Portuguese event entirely dedicated to alternative culture.

The following year, the group launched the second edition of the Lisbon Grand Meeting, also working on the co-realization and production of the Lisbon Academic Week. In 1999 they held the exhibition "O 25 de Abril em BD" for the cultural company Antevisão, exhibited in the Museum of the Republic. In 2000, the international platform Nirvana Roadshows was created, which operated in the provision of customized vehicles for tours of other companies and corporates. In 2001, they participated in the inaugural event of the handover of the new high school in Dili by the culture department of the Lisbon City Council , also working on the design of the “New York" exhibition", a tribute to the victims of the September 11 attacks. In 2002, the Custom Circus brand was created and officialized as a trademark. One of the reasons for the formalization of the company was the fact that, when they worked for those who hired them, they lost the rights to the shows and contents they created; At a certain point, they made the decision to have their own company, thus keeping the rights and pursuing the presentation of their shows.

After this officialization of Custom Circus, the itinerant nature remained as the group continued to live and work in a nomadic way. Later, given the possibility of the group dispersing, thus ending the project, the members decided to progressively abandon the nomadic life, settling in Barcarena, Oeiras, creating in 2003 the first alternative cultural center in Portugal, the Nirvana Studios. This place was initially chosen to park their convoy’s rigs and store the massive gear used by the group in their various shows, but it was eventually chosen to found their base. This troupe, as an artistic association, is the founder and responsible for all the artistic and cultural programming of Nirvana Studios, where daily and permanent activities have been held over the years since its foundation. This cultural hub is open 24/7, every day of the year, operating as a platform for independent artists and a huge compound for the production of cultural avant-garde trends, as well as a haven for indie artists, including a vast array of performative arts, from concerts, theater or dance.On March 28, 2006 it was constituted as a non-profit cultural association. Although they started creating these headquarters in 2003, it was only in 2012 that the company left its routine of performing the apocalyptic on the road shows that had characterized them so much initially.

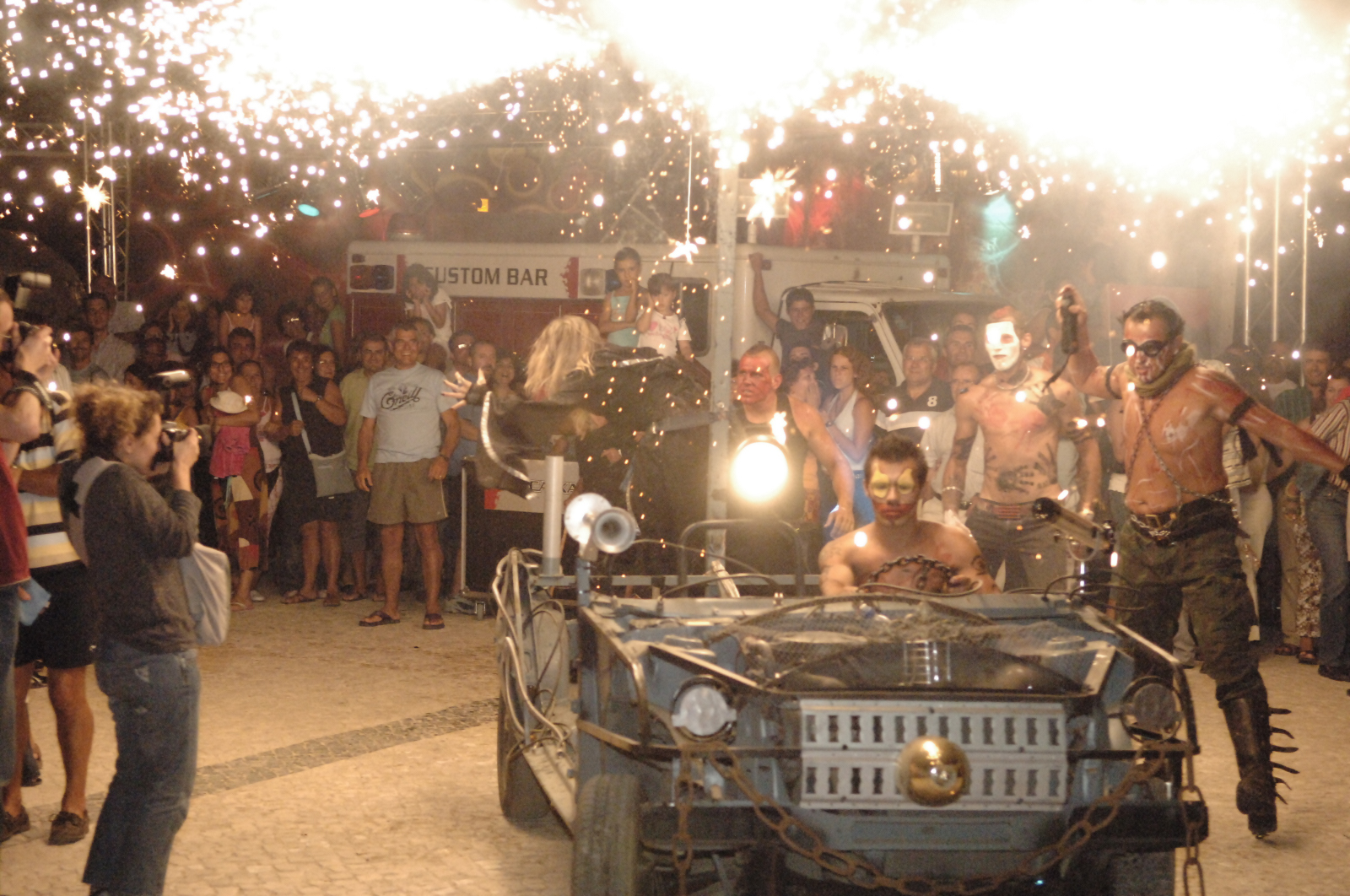
Performance in the show Teatro Sobre Rodas, in 2006

For more than 20 years, Custom Circus has contributed to the promotion of bands, theater, outdoor theater, scenography, literature, among other focuses. . On April 13, 2022, they were granted with the Municipal Cultural Interest Association’s seal, which was approved at an official assembly of the Municipality of Oeiras. In 2023 the Municipality of Oeiras launched a literary work covering the 20 years of the company, as well as its origins and a photo gallery of its shows. According to Adolfo Gutkin, teacher, playwright, and theatre director who wrote this book's preface, the company and its members are "unclassifiable".During its existence, the Custom Circus launched 15 interactive theatre productions, 10 record albums, dozens of exhibitions and visual art installations, 10 literary publications and several projects, like the first Portuguese alternative cultural center, as an example.

== Performance characteristics ==
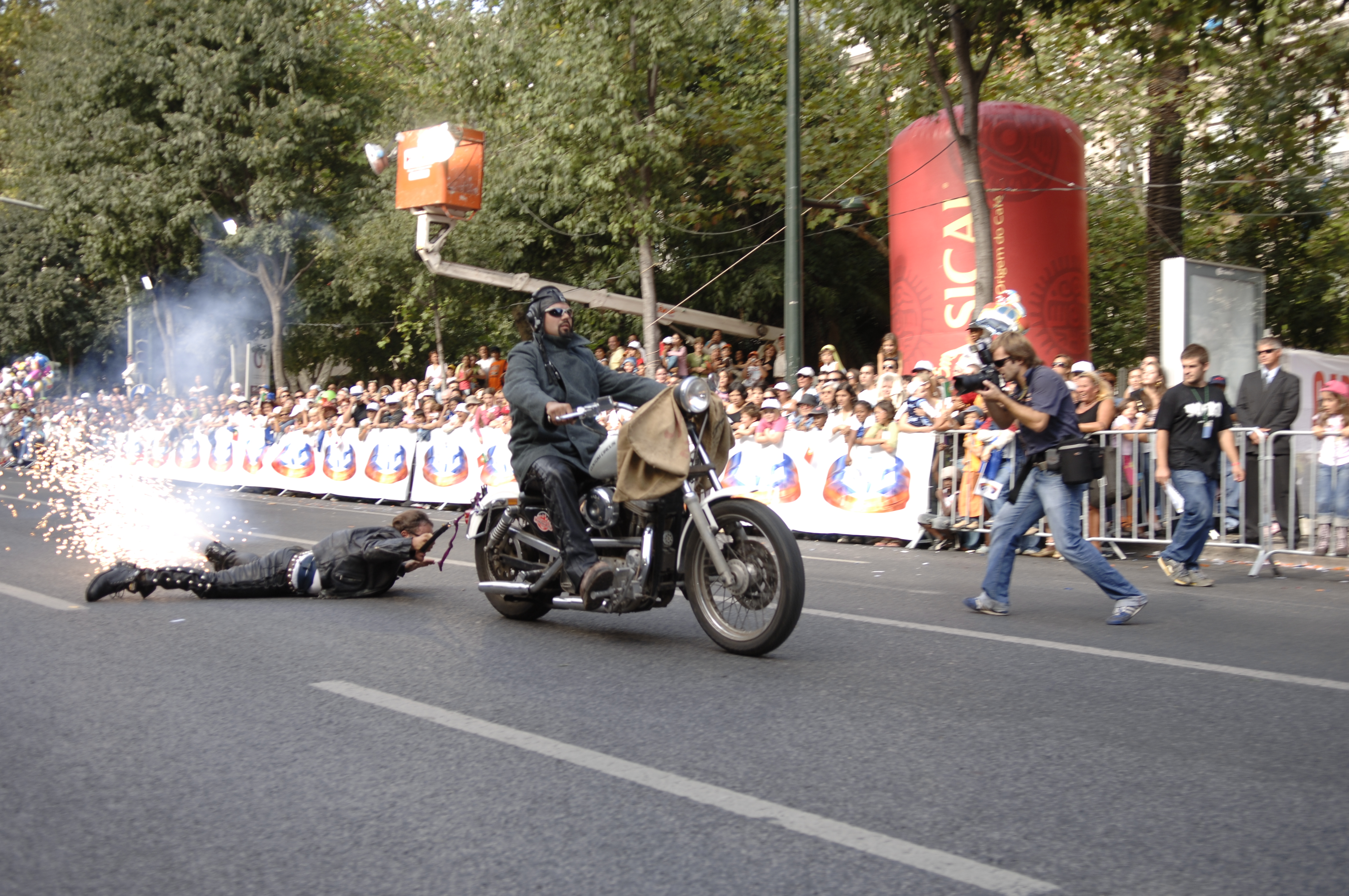
Two of the company's founders, Michel Alex and Rui Gago during a television show for SIC in 2006

The company presents itself in a mixture of different aesthetic spectrums, exploring various Subcultures, subgenres and avant-garde movements, although they often work along the lines of the Post-Apocalyptic, Cabaret Rock, the Steampunk, Gothic or Dark wave. Due to its artistic transdisciplinary modus operandi, the company performs its shows on various types of venues and settings, which can be on a traditional stage, on top of a bus, a locomotive, or on the road. The Pyrotechnic art is also an almost constant in their shows, whether in outdoor sets or more regular stages, even inside industrial buildings; for this, Custom Circus teams with several professionals in this field, such as the Luso Pirotecnia Group, and especially Pirotecnia Oleirense, thus maintaining a professional relationship that dates back to 2006. In addition to gunpowder, they also use other fuels such as petrol, petroleum, Isopar, nitrocellulose, among others.

In terms of accessories, props and costumes, the company has been creating its own collections over time, so that they can better meet the narratives of the shows they perform. Due to some degree of environmental conscience, all the materials used, that wears out over time, is tendentially recycled and reused to create new props. At each show and performances, all the members have a great deal of freedom for stage improvisation.

Custom Circus' shows also seek to reach the digital world, enabling the company to articulate high-tech audiovisual equipment, not only to complement the dramaturgic arch but also to better brand the show itself. To do so, the company has been working with CISCO, an IT company, although it also has its own stage technicians who operate various devices such as robotic props, video mapping, among others.

== Vehicles and platforms ==
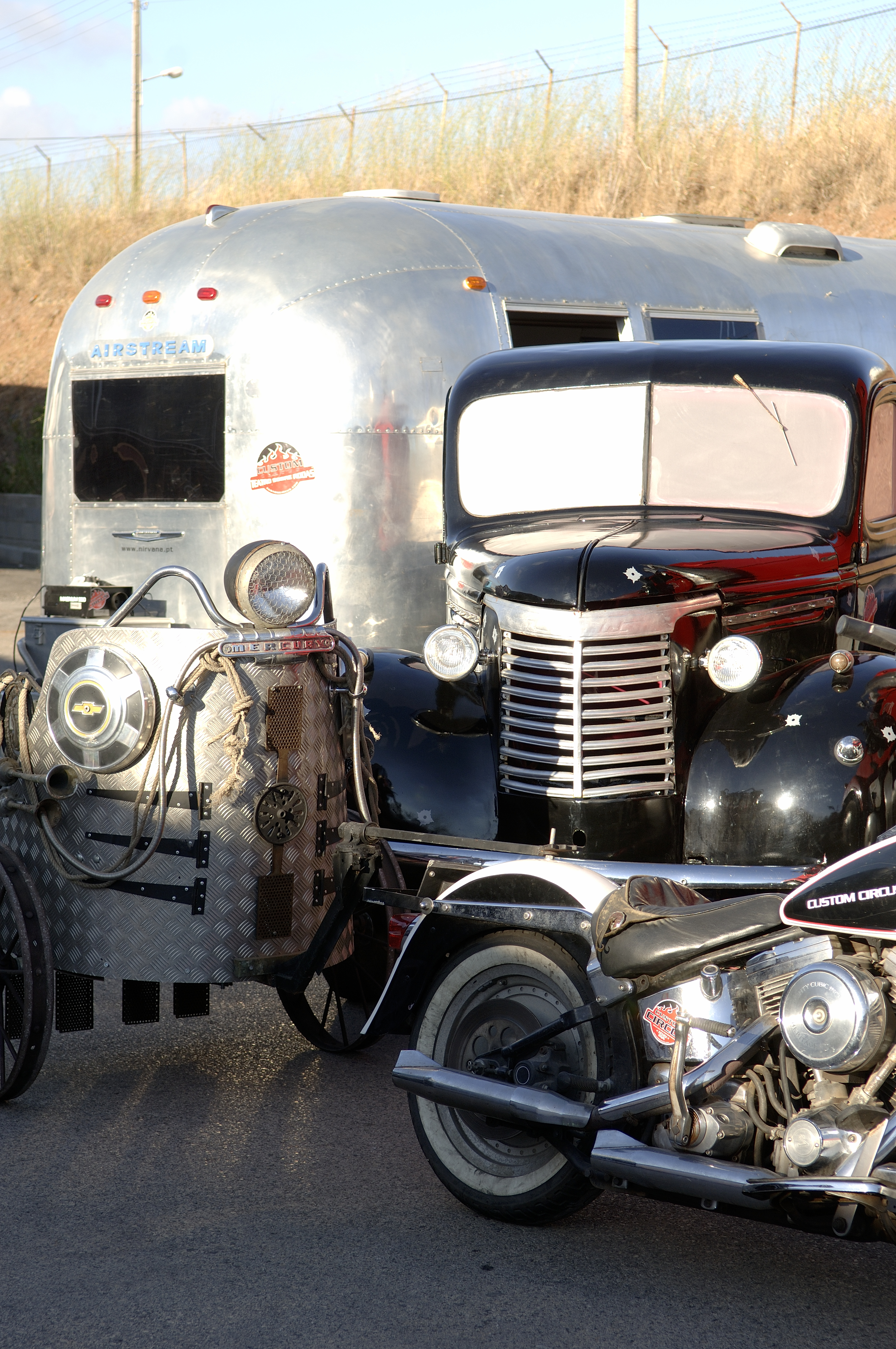
Some of the company's vehicles, such as a vintage Airstream, a classic bike towed to a roman chariot, and a streamlined pickup.

Since its foundation, the Custom Circus company has performed using various vehicles such as motorcycles, cars or trucks, which not only serve as a means of transport for the company's members and their gear, but also as props, stages or structures for the shows they perform. The very way they started their artistic activity ended up to pave the name itself for the company, as they used modified and personalized vehicles (Custom) and created an arena shaped area for their performances (Circus) with said vehicles.

Over the years, their convoy grew up to 30 vehicles, consisting of 5 classic American rigs, 3 Airstream caravans, 3 buses, 2 army trucks, 2 fire trucks, 5 vintage camper vans, 4 pickup trucks, 1 backhoe, 1 dumper, 4 mad cars, and 4 custom motorcycles. When the company decided to create Nirvana Studios, most of the vehicles were sold in order to generate revenue for the creation of their alternative cultural center. Hence, at Nirvana Studios, in addition to the vehicles they already owned, the company acquired other strange vehicles over the years, such as two old Lisbon electric street cars, which works as a ticket office for the Custom Circus shows, the other one as a diner, and a 100-ton 1903 German locomotive, which previously belonged to Comboios de Portugal.

== Visual Arts ==
=== Art for Peace ===
Two days after the Russian invasion of Ukraine, the company decided to adapt the Custom Café Theater, one of the buildings of the Nirvana Studios cultural center, into a support base called Hangar SOS Ukraine, with the aim of helping to provide aid to refugees from the war. Before and after each show, the company started to draw attention to the cause. In this initiative, a TIR highway truck was chartered twice to Krakow, Poland, with its trailer artistically decorated with a Ukrainian flag motive. Both financially and logistically, the mission was supported by volunteers, from private individuals to companies.

=== Limbus Infinitus ===
Due to the COVID-19 pandemic in 2020–2021, the company was forced to cancel its season shows called "Diesel Punk". Since the props and stage mechanisms had already been created before the governmental cancellation, a parallel project was design and produced in the form of an exhibition. The concept revolved around a situation of limbo, referencing the waits and confinements of the pandemic era, also acting as a behind the camera into various components used by the company. For this project, all the props and mechanisms were created from more than 3,000 individual objects and artefacts dating back from the 30s, 40s and 50s

=== Absurdium ===
The three successive years of the Absurdium show culminated in an exhibition bearing the same name. A gallery was created featuring a specific path that could be visited – though, in the core of the exhibition, a collection of recycled sofas were installed for visitors to sit and observe the pieces.

=== Time Capsule - Heirs of the Apokalypse ===
This scenography installation, based on a roadshow ideology, is an exhibition installed inside interconnected containers. In its full version, it’s also an outdoor theater show performed on top of said containers. This immersive exhibition conveys Biological and Ambiental alert messages, inviting visitors to interact with the exhibition itself. This project has already been featured in several events and cultural beams such as Comic Con Portugal, the Steampunk Festival Vapor, also celebrations such of Children's Day, among others. When it is not on tour or on display elsewhere, it can be seen at Nirvana Studios. Its curatorship is signed by Fátima de Llera, founder of In Situ, a cultural heritage preservation company.

=== Junkyard Passerelle ===
Based on the wide repertoire of performances, sculptures, installations, props and other artistic components from the company, Junkyard Passerelle was a metaphoric fashion show that took place between 2020 and 2021. The project revolves around the consumerism of global society, and sought to draw attention to the disposable issues, the urgent importance of a new reuse psychology and the reduction in the consumption of fossil fuels.

=== Other projects in the visual arts ===
Every year, mainly for the Nirvana Studios Festival, several exhibitions are created. One of them, called Octopus, was set up in the Daniela Sousa, one of the company's founders, riding the chariot of the Atland Monowheel during a performance, designed in such a way that the public could not enter the gallery, but instead could only see the artwork from the outside. The exhibition consisted of a single centerpiece that expanded into eight tentacles in a radial area of 300 square meters. Among others, in the painting field, another exhibition was launched in 2022 inside one of the company's Airstream caravans, with the theme revolving around the 7 deadly sins.

== Paradoxical Collection ==
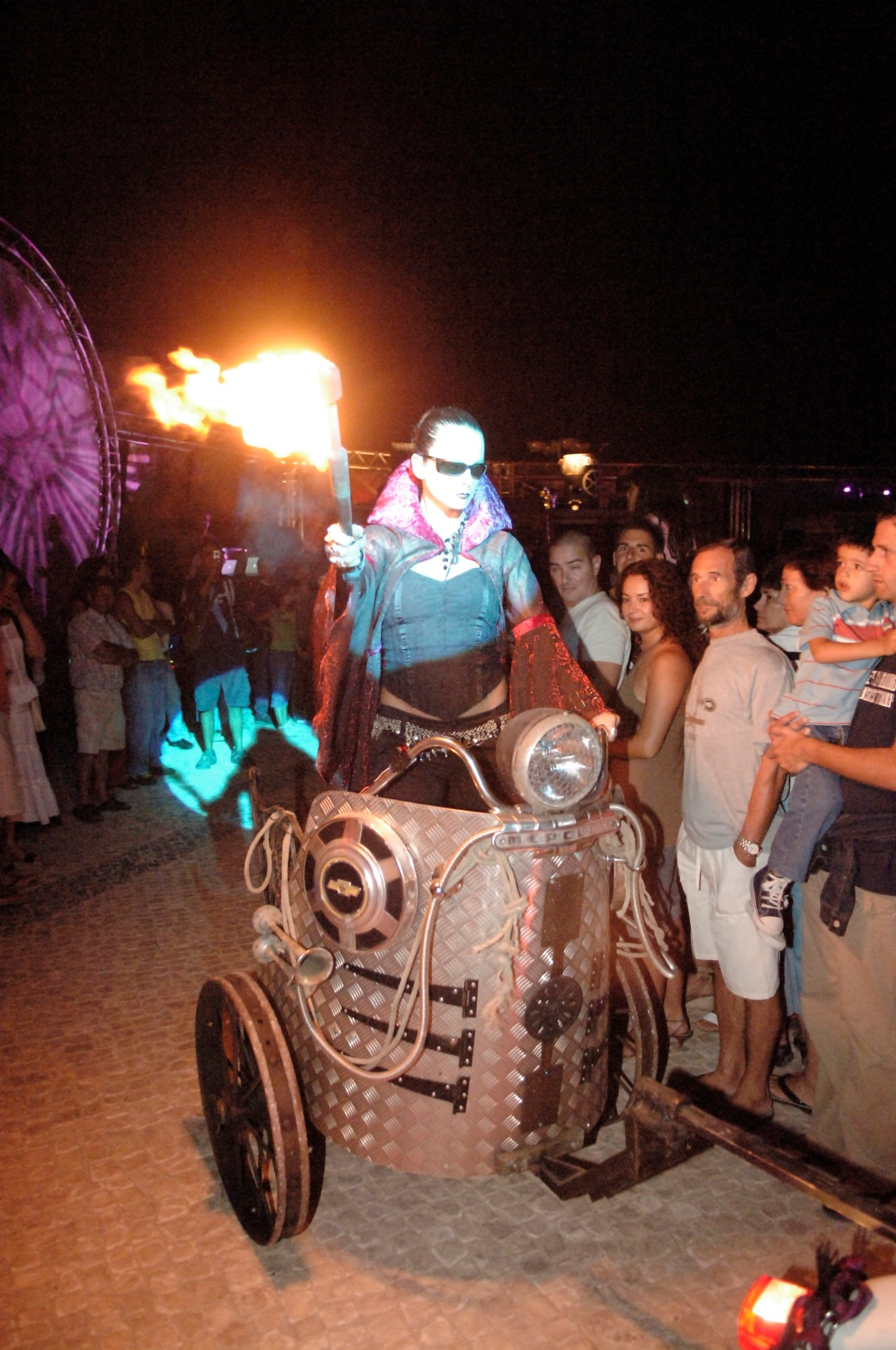
Daniela Sousa, one of the company's founders, riding the chariot of the Atland Monowheel during a performance

Over the years of activity, the Custom Circus company has been creating several pieces and props for its shows, from the revisiting of certain objects and accessories to the modification of the company's vehicles. With such growth of their artistic stock, the Paradoxical Collection was therefore created to give a new use to the collection items that are not in current use. This exhibit project consists of a series of artefacts, props and vehicles that travel the country, or on display in several museums, articulating several partnerships, among other crossings. This project was assisted by the writer and historian João Mendes Rosa, who was also the curator of the first large scale piece, the "Atland Monowheel", which in 2020 obtained residency at the National Coach Museum, in Lisbon.

=== Atland Monowheel ===
Atland Monowheel is an installation consisting of two vehicles, one monowheel and a kind of roman chariot. After having been used in shows such as Full Moon, Theater on Wheels and Absurdium, it started being adapted for the Paradoxical Collection (aka Paradoxal Collection) with the support of AC-American Choppers. Curated by João Mendes Rosa, the installation ended up being exhibited at the National Coach Museum staying to this day as a resident piece.

The Monowheel’s engine was designed from a 1986 Harley-Davidson, fitted into a circular traction mechanical design based on a caterpillar track. The trailer was developed as a classic chariot built from vintage car parts; for example, the rims come from a Chevrolet truck from World War I, while the oldest parts are the central column of the chariot's cabin, which comes from a street car from the 1900’s, followed by a pressure gauge donated by an old steam boiler from around 1890.

The piece itself recreates, on a real scale, one of the vehicles used in one of the novel series released by the company, in addition to having already been used during their shows.

=== Saga Caravan ===
Saga Caravan is the name given to a piece consisting of a Steampunk Freightliner motorhome, the last survivor of the five trucks on the company's theatrical convoy. In 2020, it became a resident piece of the National Railway Museum, curated by Manuel Novaes Cabral. It is a large-tonnage RV, visitable inside and outside. Like the Atland Monowheel, its design and interior contains parts repurposed from other vintage vehicles and the concept itself is also a recreation of one of the vehicles used by one of the characters in Atland - the Custom Circus Saga.

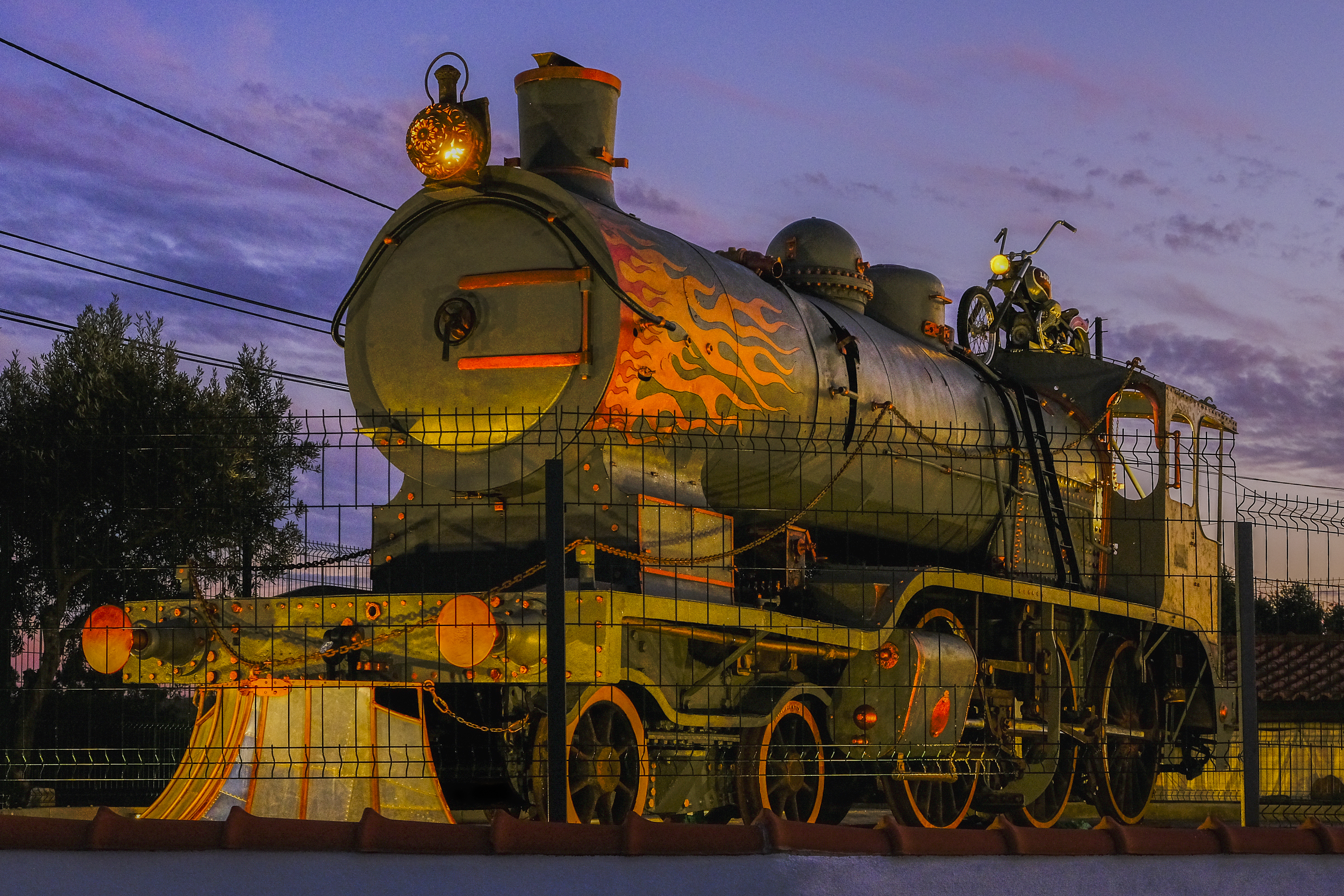
The company’s locomotive, installed right next to the main gate of Nirvana Studios

=== Loco'Motive ===
It’s an artistically customized 1903 Borsig 100-ton steam locomotive formerly the CP 238 Locomotive which operated until 1960. This installation was inaugurated on October 3, 2020 as an artistic project carried out in partnership with the Foundation of the National Railway Museum of Portugal, the Municipality of Entroncamento, the Municipality of Oeiras, Comboios de Portugal, Infraestruturas de Portugal, among other institutions. It is curated by Silvana Bessone, director of the National Coach Museum. As a former railway vehicle, it was immobilized in 1960 due to the boiler’s explosion, and since then lying abandoned on a railway cemetery. The entire project, from the acquisition steps to the current installation, took 3 years.

Installed next to the main entrance door of the Nirvana Studios cultural center, the aesthetics of the piece connects the Industrial Archaeology with the imaginary of Steampunk, being often used in some of the company's performances. Currently, one of the company's choppers is installed above the locomotive. Originally parked in the Entroncamento, the locomotive was transported on a special rig and escorted by a group of 300 bikers to Oeiras, where it remains to the present. This transport involved a series of specialized trucks, cranes and trailers due to the wide proportions of the piece, in addition to the presence of firefighters and the help of operators who had to divert telecommunication cables to transport such vehicle.

== Nirvana Studios ==
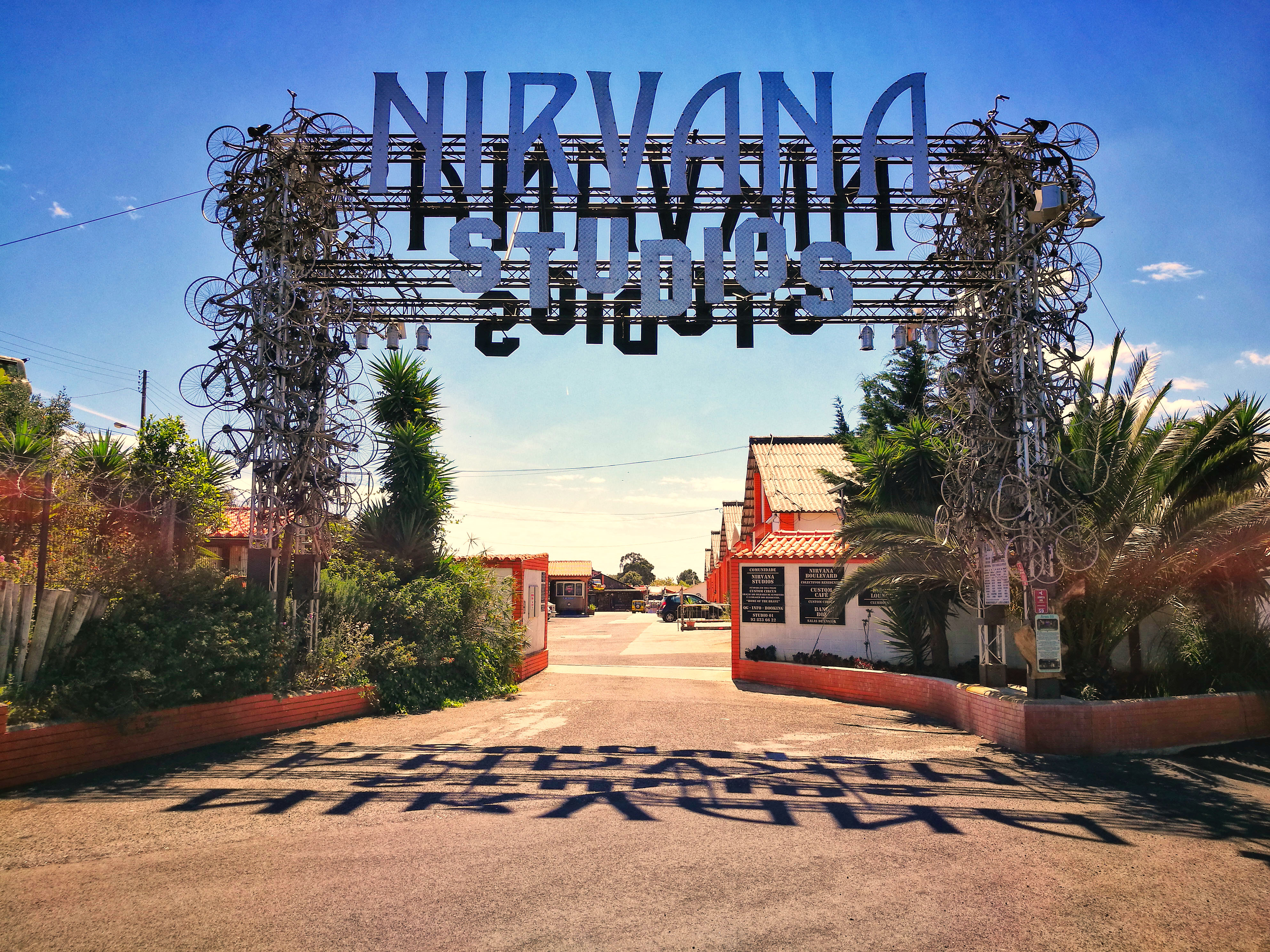
Entrance to the alternative cultural center Nirvana Studios

Nirvana Studios, founded in 2003, is housed in an old army fort, at the time deactivated, in Barcarena, Oeiras. Initially chosen as a parking lot for their convoy and gear that they used in their shows, the place was then highly deteriorated, without sanitation, water or electricity. Even so, it was the place they’ve chosen as the company's headquarters, so they decided to rebuild it. As an alternative cultural center, it houses dozens of collectives residing in this vast area dedicated to culture. These collectives make use of the rows of multipurpose studios, workshops, rehearsal and recording rooms, plus another two hectares of areas and infrastructures designed to hold events - outdoors or indoors. Annually the center hosts and manages hundreds of cultural events The name Nirvana has no relation to the American band of the same name; the choice of the word refers to its original Buddhist meaning, which refers to a state of perfect happiness and peace.

The integral facilities of the old hangars were progressively restored and converted to house an artistic community. The entire space, about 3 hectares, has been rebuilt using massive Upcycling eco-architecture with post-apocalyptic aesthetics. In addition to the restoration works, a wall of fame was erected for the more supportive and prominent artists who have crossed their work in these installations. A temporary residency hub for artists and a 360-degree conceptual theater were also created in a style dedicated to alternative aesthetics, such as Cabaret Rock, Steampunk, Industrial and Fantasy. This was a work carried out over the years as the company acquired funds; for example, one of the main buildings and stages of the cultural center, the Custom Café Theater, was under construction for eight years, only to be completed in 2012.

In addition to the entertainment aspect, the 3 hectares of the cultural center also features infrastructures for corporative, institutional or social events, thus hosting a catering and entertainment agenda throughout the year.

At the same time, the community also harbors collectives from different alternative spheres, offering various services such as tattoos, surfboards and skateboards, custom vehicles, chopper motorcycles and so forth. In 2022, the center housed more than 200 music bands, to which are added other artists in the fields of theater, dance, performance, film and television, as well as projects like Aurea, Buraka Sound System or D'Zrt, and also extreme sports, Environmental movements, among others

== Shows ==
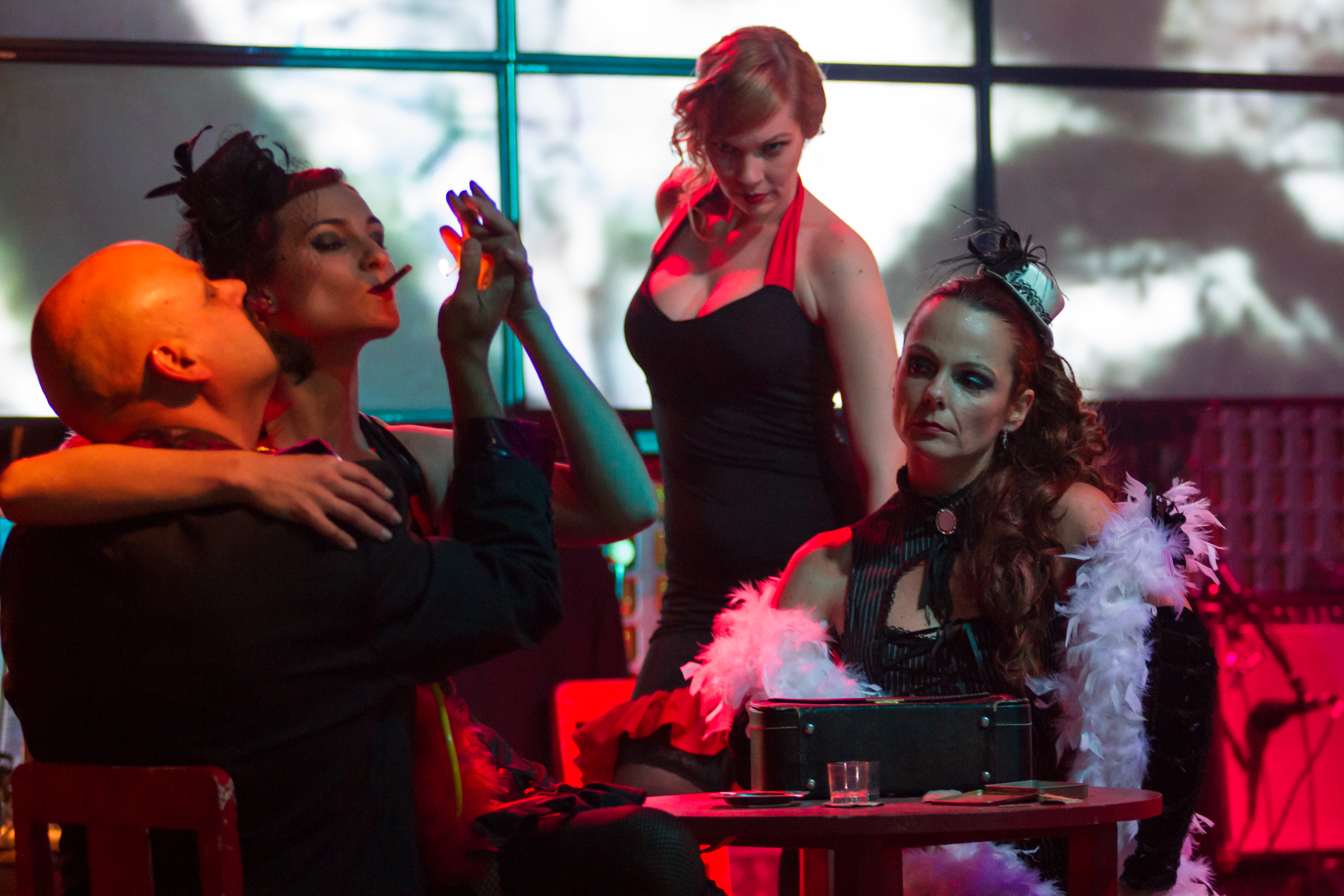
Custom Circus on stage in 2012

Custom Circus, given its multidisciplinary nature that encompasses various artistic modalities and concepts, has been performing over the years a series of shows regularly, both on tour and at Nirvana Studios. Along more than 20 years many productions took place, such as: Saga da Roda (2002 – 2003), the first play after the formal creation of the company, Custom Parade (2003 – 2009), an itinerant show using multimedia structures and fire instruments, Lua Cheia (2004 – 2006), an event that involved the public in an arena of custom vehicles rooted in the own company's style,Teatro Sobre Rodas (2005 – 2010), a show that lasted 5 years and marked the peak of the company in its nomadic period, reaching more than 30 vehicles engaged in the show Custom Party (2004 – 2010), which scenically emerged in the same aesthetic molds as Teatro Sobre Rodas, Prisoners of the Blues (2006–2007), where the Cabaret Rock aesthetic began to be emerge more seriously, Performers of Fire (2007–2009), a show where the company established itself on the permanent stages of Nirvana Studios grounds, paving the way for the next production, Gigolo Dance (2008–2011), with a Gothic Vaudeville and Burlesque aesthetics, Le Cabaret Rock (2012 – 2013), was a show that reached more than 40 thousand spectators at the Custom Café Theater, conveying a plot focused between the nostalgic past and the post-apocalyptic future – this public’s response also allowed the calendarization of a tour featuring 100 additional shows, Bizarre Chic (2014 – 2015), a 100% steampunk staging, sequel to the previous Le Cabaret Rock, immersed in the company's music, constituting itself as a mix of concert, theater and cabaret.

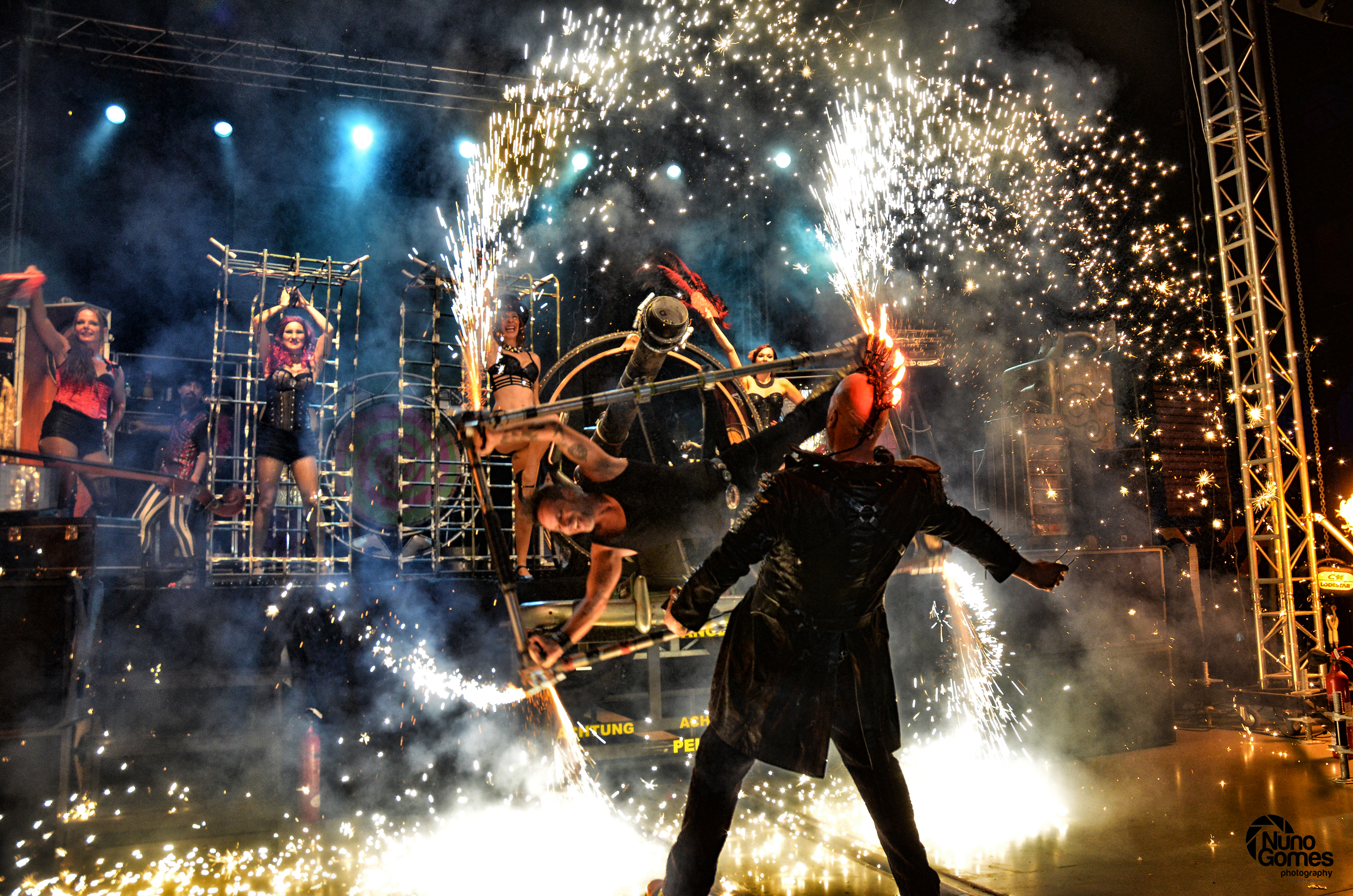
One of many company's performances at Nirvana Studios, in 2018

In 2015, the troupe released A Viagem, a production presented over two years as a Best Of show, featuring some of the highlights that the company has done so far Next, Heirs of the Apokalypse - Time Capsule "The Performance" was released, which has been presented since 2016 and revolves around an apocalyptic bunker carrying ecological messages, Absurdium (2017 – 2019), where several secrets of the former fort housing Nirvana Studios were theatrically disclosed, through a plot taking place in an imaginary society around the year 2072, Loco'Motive (since 2020), the outdoor theater show rooted around the Loco’Motive installation and stage - Since this project was launched, the company has been invited to perform on top, or around other locomotives provided by the same museum. In 2021, Art For Peace, a show created around their artistic movement supporting Ukraine In the same year Going Crazy also premiered, in which the own history of the company unfolds in a frenzy one hour span and, since 2022 Custom Circus has been performing their long institutionalized show Le Cabaret Rock – always reloading the concept of the original show that started in 2012, therefore fusing new approaches and nuances.

=== Other Shows ===
Due to the ongoing exchange with cultural institutions from other countries, other programs were carried out such as The Poetry Brothel for the Oeiras International Poetry Biennial, or the TODOS Orchestra, with the mentorship of Jorge Barreto Xavier., among many other international projects. The company also establishes partnerships through its theatrical sector, with the support of IPM - Portuguese Institute of Museums, in the realization of artistic, performative, literary, industrial and museum intersections.

== Music ==
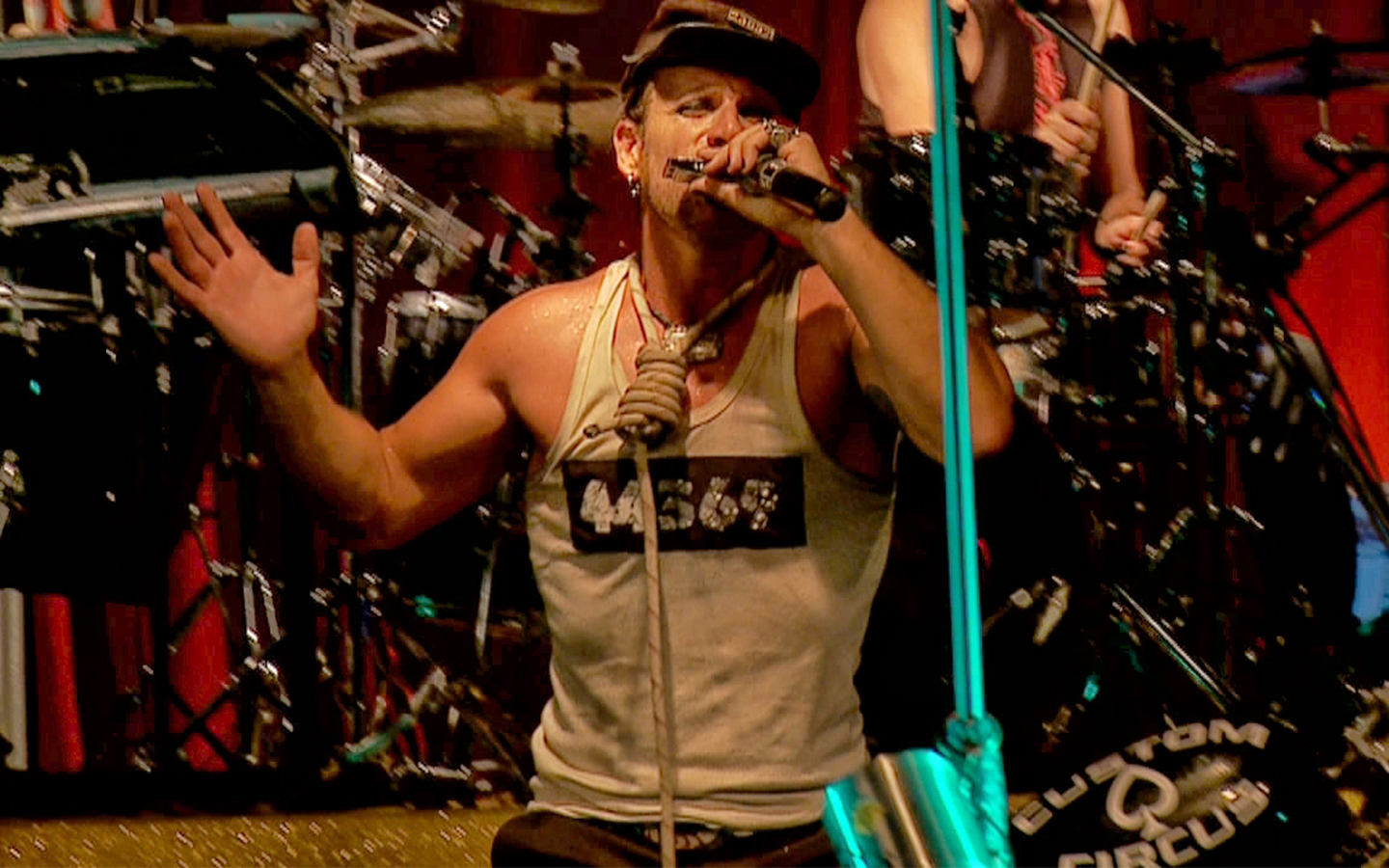
Michel Alex during a musical performance

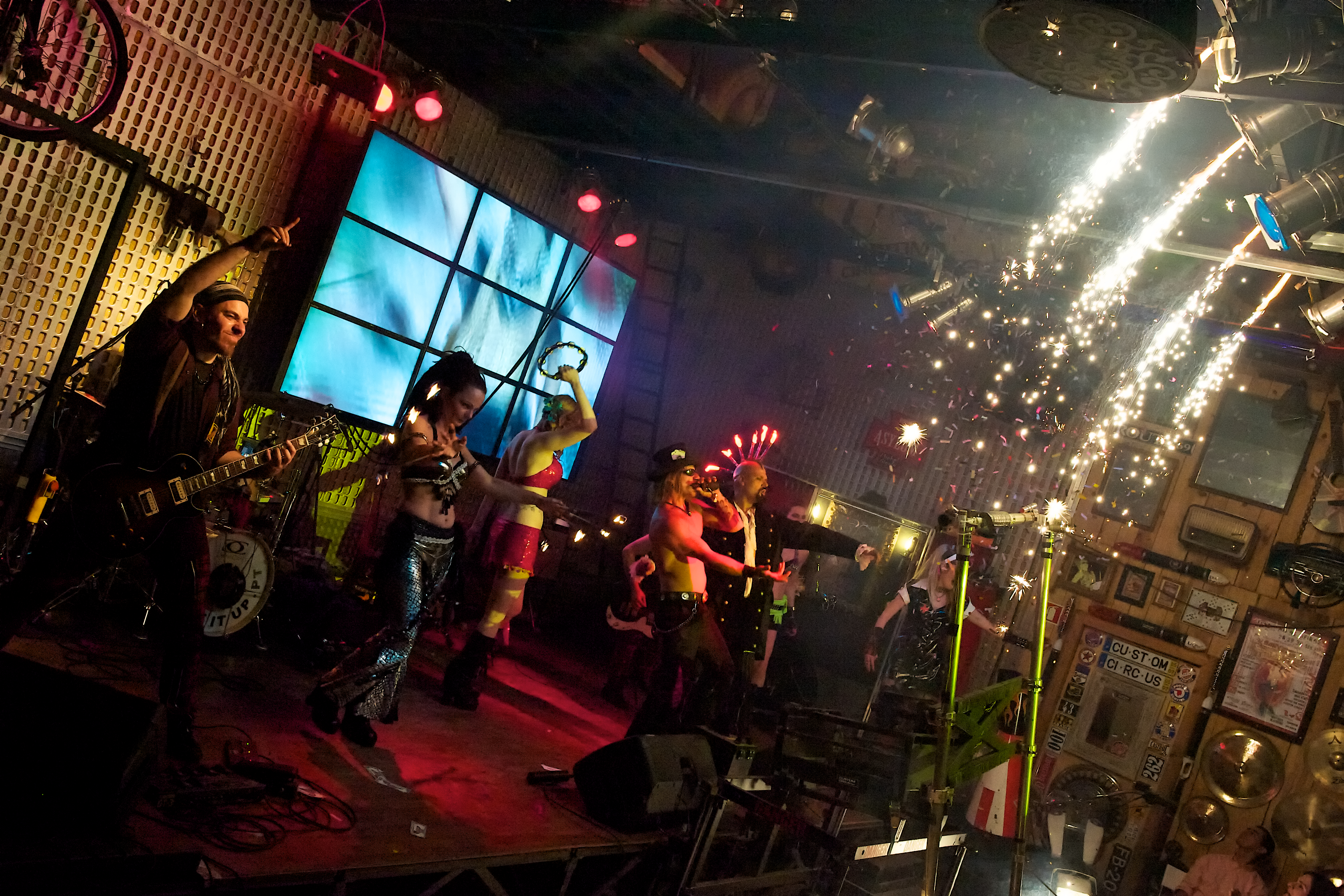
A musical performance by Custom Circus in 2012

Over the years, the company has released 10 albums:

1. Custom Circus (2007) — The company's first album, featuring Electronic, Blues, Alternative and Industrial Rock, among other genres;
2. Gigolo Dance (2008) — First album with a record contract, with Iplay, from Media Capital,with characteristics of Cabaret Rock music;
3. Le Cabaret Rock (2012) — First album recorded at Nirvana Studios, from the show with the same name;
4. Bizarre Chic (2014) — Totally with Steampunk characteristics, it also comes from the show with the same name;
5. Absurdium (2017) — A work that portrays the company's theatrical liturgy;
6. Diesel Punk (2020) — Recorded before the COVID-19 pandemic, it is composed of a set of originals that have had repercussions on several of the company's projects off stage;
7. Voyages de L'émotion (2021) – Includes a large part of the Soundtrack of the show Going Crazy;
8. Abattoir Lullaby - (2022) - With a set of darker and more controverse songs, it contains part of the soundtrack of the show Le Cabaret Rock - Reloaded;
9. Ynstrumental (2023) - An album composed of instrumental themes ;
10. Erasmus Musicians Play Custom Circus(2023) - An album created by several interns and erasmus tutors of the music production courses, with songs revisited from previous albums.

== Literature ==
In addition to having collaborated in several publications such as "Adolfo Gutkin, The Multicultural and Rebel Utopia" (2019) by Edições Giostri - Brazil, and (2021) by Verbi Gratia Edições, "Steampunk Almanac 2019" by Editorial Divergence, "New Anthology - Steampunk Almanac 2022" by Editorial Divergence, "Bang Magazine! - Rubrica de Teatro" (2022) by Edições FNAC - Saída de Emergência, and Encyclopedia of Portuguese Horror 2023 by Verbi Gratia Edições, the company has also released 9 literary publications in the post-apocalyptic genre:

1. The Wheel Saga (aka A Saga da Roda) (1988, 2004, 2019) - Novel - A narrative taking place on a desert world called Atland – the former Atlantic Ocean - where a nation of tribes travel in large convoys of rigs. It has had four editions, two of Nirvana Produções (in 2004 and 2005) and two of Editorial Divergência (2019 and 2021;
2. Heirs of Apokalipe (2005, 2016) - Manifesto - Published by the Youth Department of the Municipality of Oeiras, it addresses a dystopian universe, where the characters resort to what is left of the old world to create a new society;
3. Mekanon (2004, 2019) - Novel – Awarded with the Fantastic Literature Adamastor Grand Prize for Portuguese in 2021, published by Editorial Divergência, this book addresses a post-apocalyptic universe centered in the coast of Portugal, standing as the 1rst volume of the Atland Saga;
4. Raus Human (2014, 2020) - Novel - Addresses the identity of the company and spreads warning environmental messages related to uncontrolled consumption;
5. The Fantastic Gutkin’s Curse (A Fantástica Maldição gutkin) (2020) - Biographical chronicles - Published by Verbi Gratia, already with three editions, consists of a tribute to the director and playwright Adolfo Gutkin, where the story involving the company and the Portuguese playwright is presented;
6. Wagon Village (2016, 2021) - Novel - A post-apocalyptic novel, hosted by and bearing the seal of the National Railway Museum Foundation;
7. Enygma Oeiras (2021) - Novel – Featuring a preface written by Isaltino Morais and the curatorship of João Mendes Rosa, it takes place in the main historical landmarks of Oeiras, at the same time its narrative crosses paradoxical paths with the Marquis of Pombal;
8. Atland (2022) - Novel - Explores deeper the post-apocalyptic universe where the former Atlantic Ocean has become a huge desert ruled by a tyrant Technocratic society;
9. Le Cabaret Rock (2023) - Novel - Addresses the homonymous show and the life story of one of the company's founders.
