= Transdisciplinarity =

Research that bridges academic disciplines

Transdisciplinarity is an approach that iteratively interweaves knowledge systems, skills, methodologies, values and fields of expertise within inclusive and innovative collaborations that bridge academic disciplines and community perspectives, to develop transformative outcomes that respond to complex societal challenges.

While Multidisciplinarity involves studying a subject from multiple disciplines that maintain their separate identities, and Interdisciplinarity integrates these perspectives to create something greater than the sum of its parts, Transdisciplinarity extends beyond academia by involving societal partners in co-creating knowledge that combines scientific and practical expertise to develop solutions with direct impact on society.

== Transdisciplinary research ==
Transdisciplinary research connotes research strategies that cross disciplinary and beyond disciplinary (social knowledge) boundaries to create a holistic approach. It applies to research efforts focused on problems that cross the boundaries of two or more disciplines, such as research on effective information systems for biomedical research (see bioinformatics), and can refer to concepts or methods that were originally developed by one discipline, but are now used by several others, such as ethnography, a field research method originally developed in anthropology but now widely used by other disciplines. The Belmont Forum elaborated that a transdisciplinary approach is enabling inputs and scoping across scientific and non-scientific stakeholder communities and facilitating a systemic way of addressing a challenge. This includes initiatives that support the capacity building required for the successful transdisciplinary formulation and implementation of research actions.

Transdisciplinarity has two common meanings:

=== German usage ===
In German-speaking countries, Transdisziplinarität refers to the integration of diverse approaches, and includes specific methods for relating knowledge in problem-solving. A 2003 conference held at the University of Göttingen showcased the diverse meanings of multi-, inter- and transdisciplinarity and made suggestions for converging them without eliminating present usages.

When the very nature of a problem is under dispute, transdisciplinarity can help determine the most relevant problems and questions involved. A first type of question concerns the cause of the present problems and their future development (system knowledge). Another concerns which values and norms can be used to form goals of the problem-solving process (target knowledge). A third relates to how a problematic situation can be transformed and improved (transformation knowledge). Transdisciplinarity requires adequate addressing the complexity of problems and the diversity of perceptions on them, as well about what abstract and what case-specific knowledge is linked, and about what practices promote the common good.

Transdisciplinarity arises when participating experts interact in an open discussion and dialogue, giving equal weight to each perspective and relating them to each other. This is difficult because of the overwhelming amount of information involved, and because of a more or less incommensurability of specialized languages in each field of expertise. To excel under these conditions, researchers need not only in-depth knowledge and know-how of the disciplines involved, but skills in moderation, mediation, association and transfer.

=== Wider usage ===
Transdisciplinarity also conveys the idea of a unified body of knowledge that transcends disciplinary boundaries.

Jean Piaget introduced this usage of the term in 1970, and in 1987, the International Center for Transdisciplinary Research (CIRET) adopted the Charter of Transdisciplinarity at the 1st World Congress of Transdisciplinarity, Convento da Arrabida, Portugal, November 1994.

In the CIRET approach, transdisciplinarity is radically distinct from interdisciplinarity. Interdisciplinarity, like pluridisciplinarity, concerns the transfer of methods from one discipline to another, allowing research to spill over disciplinary boundaries, but staying within the framework of disciplinary research.

As the prefix "trans" indicates, transdisciplinarity concerns that which is at once between the disciplines, across the different disciplines, and beyond each individual discipline. Its goal is the understanding of the present world, of which one of the imperatives is the overarching unity of knowledge.

Another critical defining characteristic of transdisciplinary research is the inclusion of stakeholders in defining research objectives and strategies in order to better incorporate the diffusion of learning produced by the research. Collaboration between stakeholders is deemed essential – not merely at an academic or disciplinary collaboration level, but through active collaboration with people affected by the research and community-based stakeholders. In such a way, transdisciplinary collaboration becomes uniquely capable of engaging with different ways of knowing the world, generating new knowledge, and helping stakeholders understand and incorporate the results or lessons learned by the research.

Transdisciplinarity is defined by Basarab Nicolescu through three methodological postulates: the existence of levels of Reality, the logic of the included middle, and complexity. In the presence of several levels of Reality the space between disciplines and beyond disciplines is full of information. Disciplinary research concerns, at most, one and the same level of Reality; moreover, in most cases, it only concerns fragments of one level of Reality. On the contrary, transdisciplinarity concerns the dynamics engendered by the action of several levels of Reality at once. The discovery of these dynamics necessarily passes through disciplinary knowledge. While not a new discipline or a new superdiscipline, transdisciplinarity is nourished by disciplinary research; in turn, disciplinary research is clarified by transdisciplinary knowledge in a new, fertile way. In this sense, disciplinary and transdisciplinary research are not antagonistic but complementary. As in the case of disciplinarity, transdisciplinary research is not antagonistic but complementary to multidisciplinarity and interdisciplinarity research.

According to Nicolescu, transdisciplinarity is nevertheless radically distinct from multidisciplinarity and interdisciplinarity because of its goal, the understanding of the present world, which cannot be accomplished in the framework of disciplinary research. The goal of multidisciplinarity and interdisciplinarity always remains within the framework of disciplinary research. If transdisciplinarity is often confused with interdisciplinarity or multidisciplinarity (and by the same token, we note that interdisciplinarity is often confused with multidisciplinarity) this is explained in large part by the fact that all three overflow disciplinary boundaries. Advocates maintain this confusion hides the huge potential of transdisciplinarity. One of the best known professionals of transdisciplinarity in Argentina is Pablo Tigani, and his concept about transdisciplinarity is:

It is the art of combining several sciences in one person. A transdisciplinary is a scientist trained in various academic disciplines. This person merged all his knowledge into one thick wire. That united knowledge wire is used to solve problems that include many problems. The decision of a transdisciplinary executive is the only one that takes into account the total resolution of a problem without leaving any loose thread.

— Pablo Tigani

Currently, transdisciplinarity is a consolidated academic field that is giving rise to new applied researches, especially in Latin America and the Caribbean. In this sense, the transdisciplinary and biomimetics research of Javier Collado on Big History represents an ecology of knowledge between scientific knowledge and the ancestral wisdom of native peoples, such as Indigenous peoples in Ecuador. According to Collado, the transdisciplinary methodology applied in the field of Big History seeks to understand the interconnections of the human race with the different levels of reality that co-exist in nature and in the cosmos, and this includes mystical and spiritual experiences, very present in the rituals of shamanism with ayahuasca and other sacred plants. In abstract, the teaching of Big History in universities of Brazil, Ecuador, Colombia, and Argentina implies a transdisciplinary vision that integrates and unifies diverse epistemes that are in, between, and beyond the scientific disciplines, that is, including ancestral wisdom, spirituality, art, emotions, mystical experiences and other dimensions forgotten in the history of science, specially by the positivist approach.

== Transdisciplinary education ==
Transdisciplinary education is an approach that integrates different disciplines in a harmonious manner to construct new knowledge and elevate learners to higher domains of cognitive abilities and sustained knowledge and skills. It involves better neural networking for lifelong learning.

Transdisciplinarity has been flagged internationally as an important aim of education. For example, Global Education Magazine, an international journal supported by UNESCO and UNHCR:

"Transdisciplinarity represents the capable germ to promote an endogenous development of the evolutionary spirit of internal critical consciousness, where religion and science are complementary. Respect, solidarity and cooperation should be global standards for the entire human development with no boundaries. This requires a radical change in the ontological models of sustainable development, global education and world-society. We must rely on the recognition of a plurality of models, cultures and socio-economical diversification. As well as biodiversity is the way for the emergence of new species, cultural diversity represents the creative potential of world-society."

Within higher education, transdisciplinary curricula and programmes have received increased attention as universities deal with the complexities of preparing students to tackle contemporary challenges and the future of work, with examples including the University College London's BASc and MASc degrees, the University of Hong Kong's Common Core Curriculum, the School for Transdisciplinary Study at the University of Zurich, the Olin College of Engineering, the Transdisciplinary School at the University of Technology Sydney, the School of Integrated Studies of Singapore Management University.

== Influence in disciplines and fields ==
=== Arts and humanities ===
Transdisciplinarity can be found in the arts and humanities. For example, the Planetary Collegium seeks "the development of transdisciplinary discourse in the convergence of art, science, technology and consciousness research." The Plasticities Sciences Arts (PSA) research group also develops transdisciplinary approaches regarding humanities and fundamental sciences relationships as well as the Art & Science field. An example of transdisciplinary research in the arts and humanities can be seen in Lucy Jeffery's study on the work of Samuel Beckett, entitled Transdisciplinary Beckett: Visual Arts, Music, and the Creative Process.

=== Human sciences ===
The range of transdisciplinarity becomes clear when the four central questions of biological research ((1) causation, (2) ontogeny, (3) adaptation, (4) phylogeny [after Niko Tinbergen 1963, see also Tinbergen's four questions, cf. Aristotle: Causality / Four Major Causes]) are graphed against distinct levels of analysis (e.g. cell, organ, individual, group; [cf. "Laws about the Levels of Complexity" of Nicolai Hartmann 1940/1964, see also Rupert Riedl 1984]):

	Causation	Ontogeny	Adaptation	Phylogeny
Molecule				
Cell				
Organ				
Individual				
Group				
Society				

In this "scheme of transdisciplinarity", all anthropological disciplines (paragraph C in the table of the pdf-file below), their questions (paragraph A: see pdf-file) and results (paragraph B: see pdf-file) can be intertwined and allocated with each other for examples how these aspects go into those little boxes in the matrix. This chart includes all realms of anthropological research (no one is excluded). It is the starting point for a systematical order for all human sciences, and also a source for a consistent networking and structuring of their results. This "bio-psycho-social" orientation framework is the basis for the development of the "Fundamental Theory of Human Sciences" and for a transdisciplinary consensus. (In this tabulated orientation matrix the questions and reference levels in italics are also the subject of the humanities.). Niko Tinbergen was familiar with both conceptual categories (i.e. the four central questions of biological research and the levels of analysis), the tabulation was made by Gerhard Medicus. Certainly, a humanist perspective always involves a transdisciplinary focus. A good and classic example of mixing very different sciences was the work developed by Leibniz in seventeenth-eighteenth centuries in order to create a universal system of justice.

=== Health science ===
The term transdisciplinarity is increasingly prevalent in health care research and has been identified as important to improving the effectiveness and efficiency in health care. Transdisciplinary within public health emphasizes integrating diverse individuals, skills, perspectives, and expertise across disciplines to dissolve traditional boundaries and develop holistic approaches linking ecosystem and human health boundaries.

== See also ==
- GAIA
- Global Education Magazine – Peer-reviewed transdisciplinary journal
- International Association of Transdisciplinary Psychology
- Science of team science
