= NRM =

NRM may refer to:

- National Railway Museum (disambiguation)
  - National Railway Museum, located in York, England
- National Record Mart, former American stores
- National Resistance Movement, a political organisation in Uganda
- Natural remanent magnetization of a rock or sediment
- Natural resource management
- New religious movement, or new religion
- Niagara Railway Museum, a railway museum in Ontario, Canada
- Nordic Resistance Movement, a pan-Nordic Neo-Nazi organization
- Normal Response Mode in the HDLC communications protocol
- Norman Rockwell Museum, located in Stockbridge, Massachusetts, U.S.
- North Richmond railway station, located in Melbourne, Australia
- nrm, the ISO 639-3 code for Narom language
- N.R.M., a rock band from Minsk, Belarus
- Nucleus raphes medianus, area within the brain
