= Jose Antonio Gomariz =

Argentine economist (1919–2005)

José Antonio Gomariz (February 22, 1919 – June 15, 2005) was an Argentine economist and educator.

He was a major figure in Argentine universities, including the University of Buenos Aires, where he was one of the founders of the economics department in 1958 and dean until 1972. He was also dean of the University of Belgrano and a professor emeritus of Universidad Argentina de la Empresa. Altogether in his distinguished academic career, he was a professor of economics in five different universities for over fifty years, continuing to teach until the age of 86.

== Biography ==
Gomariz was born in Buenos Aires to unmarried immigrants from Spain. His father (also José Antonio Gomariz) left son and mother in an impoverished state in Buenos Aires after returning to Spain. Despite these humble beginnings, he excelled at school from a young age and graduated with honors with an accounting degree from the University of Buenos Aires.

After a brief military career, he joined the Central Bank of Argentina within their executive development program. In 1944, the Central Bank of Argentina awarded him (and six others) a full scholarship to attend Harvard University's Masters in Public Administration program. At Harvard, he studied under the great economists Wassily Leontief, Joseph Schumpeter, John Kenneth Galbraith and others.

After graduating with top honors from Harvard, he returned to Buenos Aires to work in the Central Bank. His career in the Central Bank was cut short however by the ascendancy of Juan Domingo Perón, who saw the Harvard-trained economists as a threat to the populist movement.

After Perón was removed from office in 1955, Gomariz joined the University of Buenos Aires faculty, where he would become one of the founders of the Facultad de Economía (Economics faculty) as chair of the International Economics department. He would later also serve as president of EUDEBA, the university printing press, and as dean of the economics department until he was ousted in 1972 by Horacio Ciafardini as part of Peron's eventual return to power.

In addition to his career in academia, Gomariz held a seat on the Buenos Aires Stock Exchange, was the chief financial officer of Acindar during its first five years of operations, was a practicing accountant and board member for several firms, and ran the first census for the government of Entre Ríos Province.

== Sources ==
- 40 años construyendo (Pagina 12. In Spanish).
- Los economistas argentinos que hicieron historia (Clarin. In Spanish).
- ACTO-HOMENAJE AL DOCTOR HORACIO CIAFARDINI (in Spanish).
