= Pablo Tigani =

Argentine economist and political scientist

- Pablo Eugenio Tigani
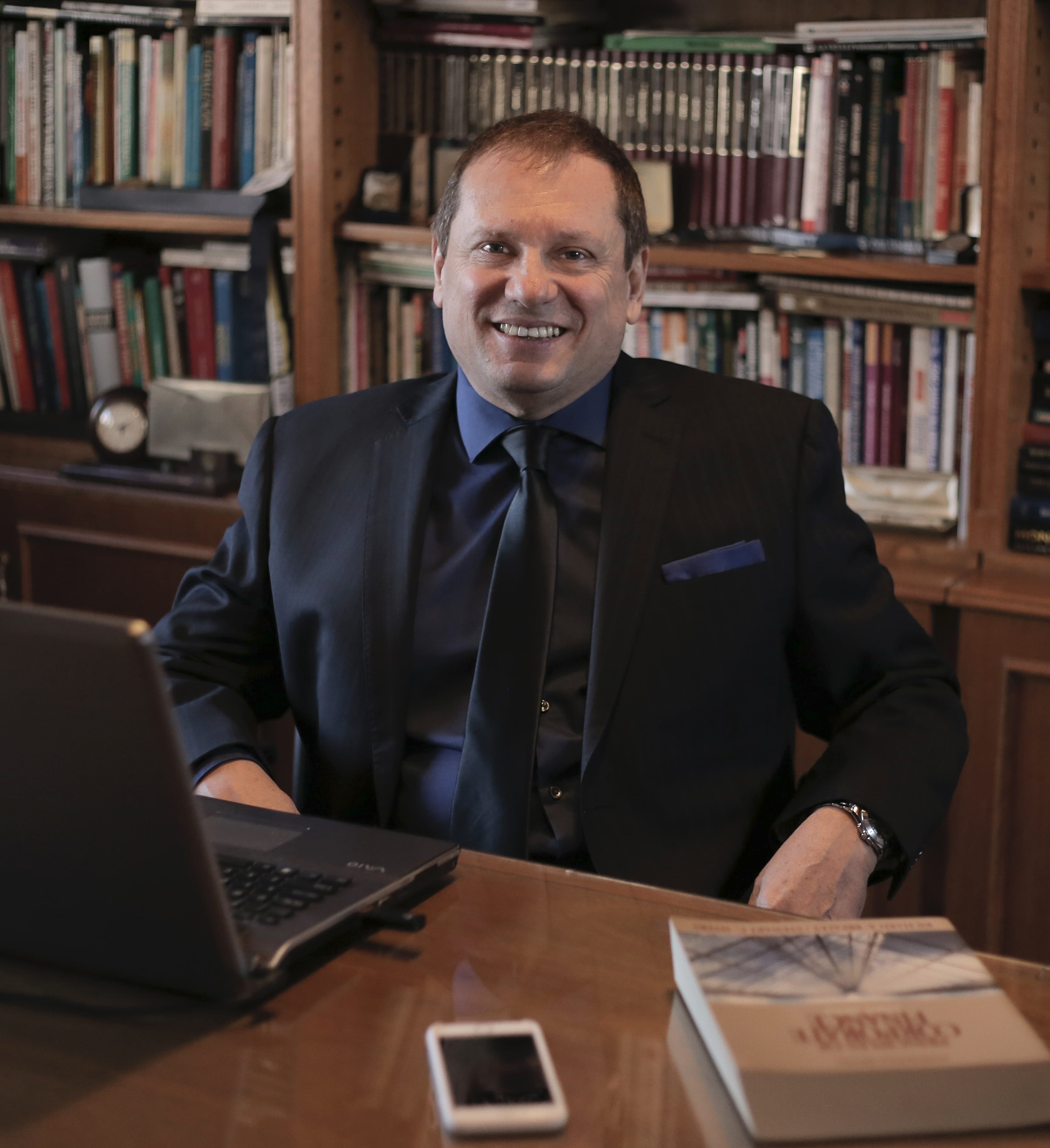
- Born: November 16, 1955 (age 70); Monte Castro, Buenos Aires, Argentina
- Occupation: economist

Academic background
- Education: University of Belgrano, University of Buenos Aires, Universidad Argentina de la Empresa
- Website: http://hacer.com.ar/

Pablo Tigani is an Argentine economist and political scientist. Tigani has a PhD in Political Science from the University of Belgrano and previously obtained his Master's in International Economic Policy from the University of Belgrano. He was a professor at the Polytechnic University of Madrid CI BA. University of Buenos Aires and Argentine Business University (UADE). He is regularly quoted by national and international news organizations such as Bloomberg TV, CNN, EFE, AFP, AMERICAN EXPRESS., and Business Week. He has first-hand experience as CEO, Managing Director, consultant, and keynote speaker at several conferences. He is the author of six books and over 1,300 articles in mass media.

== Education ==
Tigani studied the Argentine economy with Aldo Ferrer and Eduardo Curia at the Universidad Católica de la Plata (IDEPA-Institute of Applied Economic Policy). He has a degree in Business Administration from UADE, the Universidad Argentina de la Empresa (1979) revalidated by UBA, University of Buenos Aires (1981). He obtained his Master's Degree in International Economic Policy at the University of Belgrano (1988), years later he graduated as a Ph.D in Political Science (2018) at the Universidad de Belgrano.

He also a postgraduate professor at UBA Law. The Faculty created the first University Chair of: Argentine Affairs, for foreign delegations, embassies and international companies. The team work teaching staff is shared by: Adolfo Pérez Esquivel, Santiago Leiras, Christian Asinelli, María del Carmen Squeff, Jorge Arguello, Rossana Surballe, Miguel Salguero, Marina Cardelli and Agustín Romero directs.

== Career ==
From 1998 to 2001 he was a member of the panel of the accredited Cycle of monthly political, economics and business conferences with Miguel Ángel Broda and Rosendo Fraga. In October 2001, he was summoned by the senior judge of the Supreme Court Carlos Santiago Fayt to present his ideas to President Fernando de la Rúa, as a result of his work focused on solving the crisis of the Convertibility in Casa Rosada together with the Chief of Cabinet of the Chrystian Colombo Nation, focused on the structural transformation of the Argentine economy, in a long-term plan called "ARGENJAPAN'S debt solution and the take off of the economy."

From 2011 to 2017 he worked as a Master's professor at the Universidad Politecnica de Madrid CI BA. He is currently professor of postgraduate and Master's degrees at UBA and UADE respectively.

From 2008 to 2014 he was director of the Fundacion Esperanza for "political and economics research."

He was chief economist of the Fundacion Esperanza; founding partner of the Argentine Foreign Trade Forum chaired by Daniel Roel Mora, member of the Argentine Institute of Finance Executives (IAEF), member of the Professional Council of Economic Sciences and of the College of Graduated in Economic Sciences.

== Publications ==
He was a columnist in the field of Foreign Trade and editor in charge of SMEs in ambito. He has been a guest by TVE Televisión Española, Clarín, TN, La Nación, Cronista, INFOBAE, América Economía, BAE Negocios, Fortuna, O’ Glovo, 20minutos, Radio nacional, financial tribune, Perfil, zignox.

== Books ==
- ARGENJAPANS I (2002) ISBN 978-987-763-611-6
- ARGENJAPANS II (2003) ISBN 987-02-0137-7
- LIDERAZGO CONTUNDENTE (2009) ISBN 978-987-02-5214-6
- VIENTO DE KOLA (2011) ISBN 978-987-02-5507-9
- EQUAL (2011) ISBN 978-987-02-5508-6
- 2001: FMI, TECNOCRACIA Y CRISIS (2018) ISBN 978-987-763-611-6
