= Julio Ramos =

Argentine journalist and businessman

Julio A. Ramos (4 February 1935 in Buenos Aires – 19 November 2006 in Buenos Aires) was an Argentine journalist and businessman. On 9 December 1976 he founded Ámbito Financiero, a newspaper specializing in finance and economy that was later expanded to cater to a wider audience.

Ramos received a degree in Economics from the University of Buenos Aires and worked as a journalist for Noticias Gráficas, La Nación and La Opinión, among other media. He was a firm believer in free market liberalism. In 1985, Ramos ran unsuccessfully for the Deputy Chamber of the Buenos Aires Province in a center-right ticket. He also directed the Inter American Press Association from 1986 to 1989.

Ramos married twice and had five children, two of whom preceded him in death (one was electrocuted, and the other died in a car accident less than a month later). He had a personal friendship with former president Carlos Menem. He also wrote the nonfiction books Los cerrojos a la prensa (Locks on the Press, 1993) and El periodismo atrasado (Set-back Journalism, 1996).

He died of leukemia in 2006.
