= International Association of Transdisciplinary Psychology =

The International Association of Transdisciplinary Psychology is an international association of researchers, scholars, and thinkers who take a transdisciplinary approach to the study of psychology. They aim to "describe...not what the human being is, but rather, what it is to be human."

== Journal ==
Since 2009, the association has published a peer reviewed journal, The Journal of the International Association of Transdisciplinary Psychology (ISSN 2156-0269) annually.
