= School Day of Non-violence and Peace =

Observance day on January 30

School Day of Non-violence and Peace (DENIP)
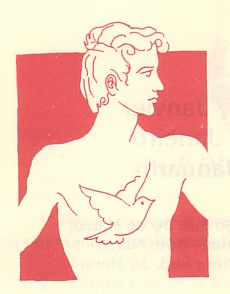
- Logo DENIP, by the painter Eulogio Díaz del Corral

The School Day of Non-violence and Peace (or DENIP, acronym from Catalan: Dia Escolar de la No-violència i la Pau) is an observance founded by the Spanish poet Llorenç Vidal Vidal in Mallorca in 1964 as a starting point and support for a pacifying and non-violent education of a permanent character. Different as the first proposed by the UNESCO "Armistice Day" in 1948, DENIP is observed on January 30 or thereabouts every year, on the anniversary of the death of Mahatma Gandhi, in schools all over the world. In countries with a Southern Hemisphere school calendar, it can be observed on 30 March. Its basic and permanent message is: "Universal love, non-violence and peace. Universal love is better than egoism, non-violence is better than violence, and peace is better than war". In Navarra the slogan for the 2009 was "above all, we are friends" (Spanish:"Por encima de todo, somos amigos").

DENIP and World Association of Early Childhood Educators (AMEI-WAECE) collaborate to celebrate this event in the schools of the latter worldwide. Former Director-General of UNESCO Federico Mayor Zaragoza has been promoting during decades the School Day of Non-violence and Peace, saying in Global Education Magazine: "We can not achieve a sustainable development without a culture of peace".

== See also ==
- International Day of Non-Violence
