= Llorenç Vidal Vidal =

Llorenzo Vidal Vidal
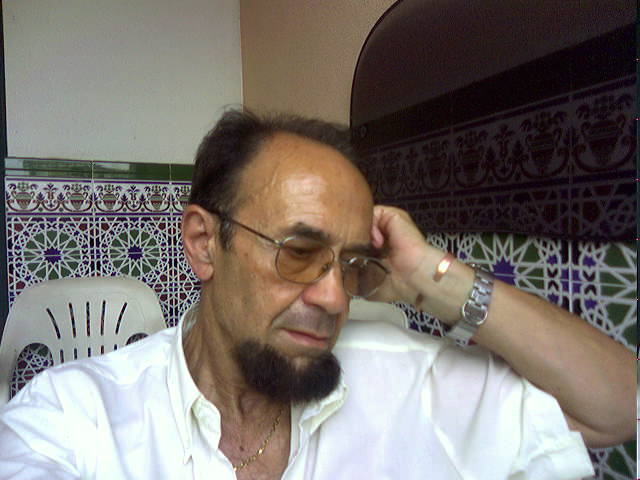
- Llorenzo Vidal Vidal in 2006
- Born: Llorenzo Vidal Vidal; 1936 (age 89–90); Santanyi, Spain
- Occupations: Writer, teacher, pacifist
- Awards: Ramon Llull Award

Llorenzo Vidal Vidal is a Majorcan poet, educator and pacifist. In 1964 he founded the School Day of Non-violence and Peace (DENIP). It is a pioneering, non-state, non-governmental, non-official, independent, free and voluntary initiative of Non-violent and Pacifying Education which is now practised in schools all over the world. In this, centres of education, teachers and students of all levels and from all countries are invited to take part. In 2010, the Cercle Universel des Ambassadeurs de la Paix, Geneva (Switzerland), appointed him Ambassador of Peace.

== Life ==
He was born in Santanyi, Mallorca, in 1936. A teacher from the Ecole Normale de Palma de Mallorca, graduate and PhD from the University of Barcelona, and education inspector at Cádiz, Ceuta and the Balearic Islands. Founder of the School Day of Non-violence and Peace (DENIP), he is working to promote a culture and an independent, free and voluntary education for non-violence and peace from 1964.

== Works: poetry (Catalan-Majorcan and Spanish) ==
- El cant de la balalaika (1958)
- 5 meditacions existencials (1959)
- Insania Terrae (1962)
- Talaiot del vent (1965 and 1972)
- Primeres Poesies (2019)
- Estels filants (1991 / 2018)
- Florilegi de poemes a Santanyí (Pregó de les Festes de Sant Jaume) (1994)
- Petits poemes (1999 / 2019)
- Poemes esparsos (2012)
- La rosa de los vientos. Recopilación poética (2012)
- Destellos Espirituales (2012 / 2019)
- 2012: Antologia Poètica (2012)
- In poetic prose is the author of Petit llibre d'un solitari / Pequeño libro de un solitario (1959, 1960, 1968, 1974 and others), considered the most important mystical, universalist and pacifist work of contemporary literature at Mallorca and Balearic Islands
- Reflexiones & Silencios

== Essay (Spanish) ==
- Entorno al problema de las lenguas regionales españolas (1964)
- Orientaciones sobre la celebración del Día Escolar de la No-violencia y la Paz (1965)
- Fundamentación de una Pedagogía de la No-violencia y la Paz (1971)
- Ideario no-violento (1981 and 2021, with the collaboration of Eulogio Díaz del Corral)
- El joven buscador de la paz (1982)
- No-violencia y Escuela. El 'Día Escolar de la No-violencia y la Paz' como experiencia práctica de Educación Pacificadora (1985)
- Artículos literarios, filosóficos y pedagógicos

== Poetry anthologies ==
- Poesia 1958 (Mallorca)
- Poesia 1959 (Mallorca)
- El vol de l'alosa (Mallorca)
- Un segle de poesia catalana (Barcelona)
- Les mil millors poesies de la llengua catalana (Barcelona)
- Antologia da poesia catalã contemporânea (São Paulo)
- Antologia da novissima poesia catalã (Lisbon)
- Antología de poesía amorosa mallorquina (1950–2000) (Mallorca)
- La mujer en la poesía hispanomarroquí (Tétouan)
- Poetas Mallorquines para la Paz (Mallorca)
- Marruecos, en español (Tétouan)
- 1ª Antología Internacional de Indrisos (São Paulo)
- Antología Poética, III Encuentro Hispanomarroquí de Poesía Trina Mercader (Tétouan)
- Miscel•lània dedicada al número 150 de la col•lecció Coses Nostres, (Mallorca)
- Palabras a tiempo. Recopilando hebras de sueño (libro colectivo solidario), (Cádiz)
- Estrechando para la paz, IV Encuentro Hispano-Marroquí de Poesía (Tétouan, 2014)
- "Poetas del siglo XXI. Antología de Poesía Mundial" por Fernando Sabido Sánchez, 2016.
- Calle de Agua, Frontera Salada, Antología Poética (Tétouan, 2017)
- Antología poética Entre dos Aguas... en homenaje a Paco de Lucía (VII Encuentro Hispano Marroquí de Poesía, Tétouan 2018).
- Antología poética Arribar al Feddan, Encuentro de Escritores en el 2020, Tétouan, 2020.
- Antología poética Despedida en Tetuán, IX Encuentro Hispano Marroquí de Poesía, Tétouan, 2022.

== See also ==
- List of peace activists
