= Ámbito Financiero =

Daily newspaper based in Argentina

- The front page of Ámbito Financiero April 12, 2011.
- Type: Daily newspaper
- Owner(s): Editorial Amfin S.A.
- Publisher: Orlando Vignatti
- Founded: 1976
- Political alignment: Kirchnerism; Formerly: Liberalism
- Language: Spanish
- Headquarters: Buenos Aires, Argentina
- Circulation: 100,000
- Website: http://www.ambito.com/

Ámbito Financiero is an Argentine newspaper founded on December 9, 1976, by economist Julio A. Ramos. It is one of the main economic newspapers. It was initially sold in Downtown Buenos Aires, covering mainly the daily prices of the U.S. dollar, gold, stocks, etc., and included other editorials.

Ámbito Financiero was acquired by Orlando Vignatti in 2008. One of its columnists is Pablo Tigani.
