= Entroncamento =

- Municipality
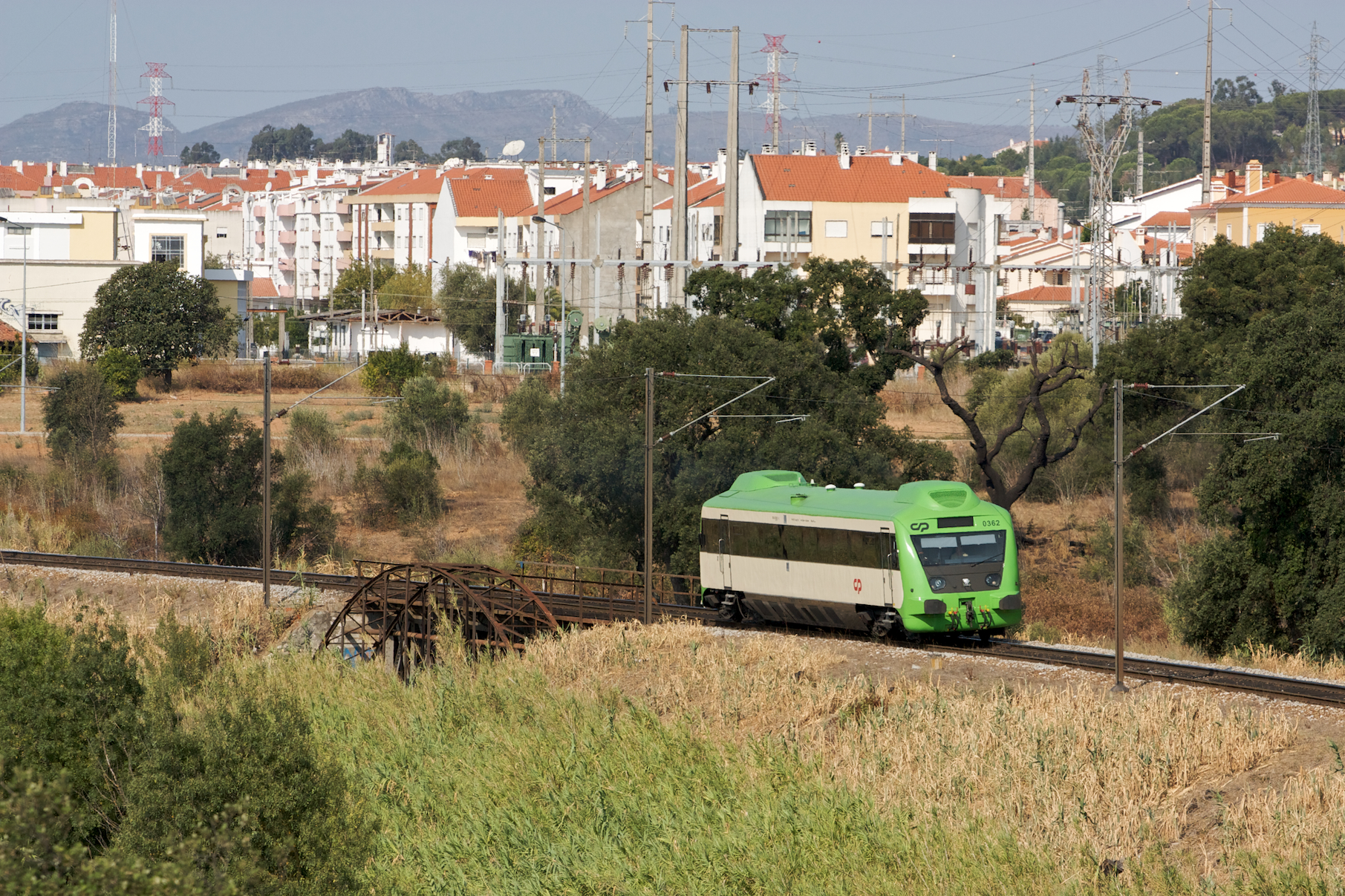
- Diesel unit of the Beira Baixa rail line at Entroncamento

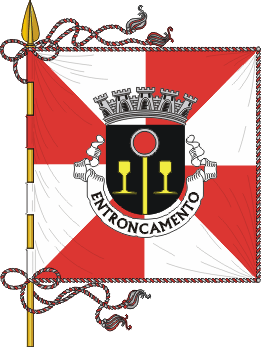
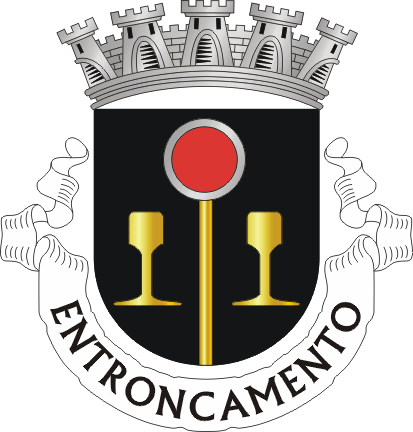
- Flag Coat of arms
- Interactive map of Entroncamento
- Location in Portugal
- Coordinates: 39°27′55″N 8°28′5″W
- Country: Portugal
- Region: Oeste e Vale do Tejo
- Intermunic. comm.: Médio Tejo
- District: Santarém
- Parishes: 2

Government
  - President: Nelson José Estrela Lopes Cunha (CH)

Area
  - Total: 13.728 km^{2} (5.300 sq mi)
- Elevation: 34 m (112 ft)

Population (2011)
  - Total: 20,206
  - Density: 1,471.9/km^{2} (3,812.2/sq mi)
- Time zone: UTC+00:00 (WET)
  - Summer (DST): UTC+01:00 (WEST)
- Postal code: 2330
- Area code: 249
- Patron: S. João Baptista
- Website: www.cm-entroncamento.pt

Entroncamento (Portuguese pronunciation: [ẽtɾõkɐˈmẽtu]) is a Portuguese municipality in district of Santarém in the Médio Tejo Subregion (Middle Tagus) of the Centro Region. The population in 2011 was 20,206, in an area of 13.73 km^{2}. Situated in the Ribatejo, it benefits from its geo-strategic position along the Tagus Valley, with important accessibility to the motorways and railway lines that historically promoted its growth and expansion.

== History ==
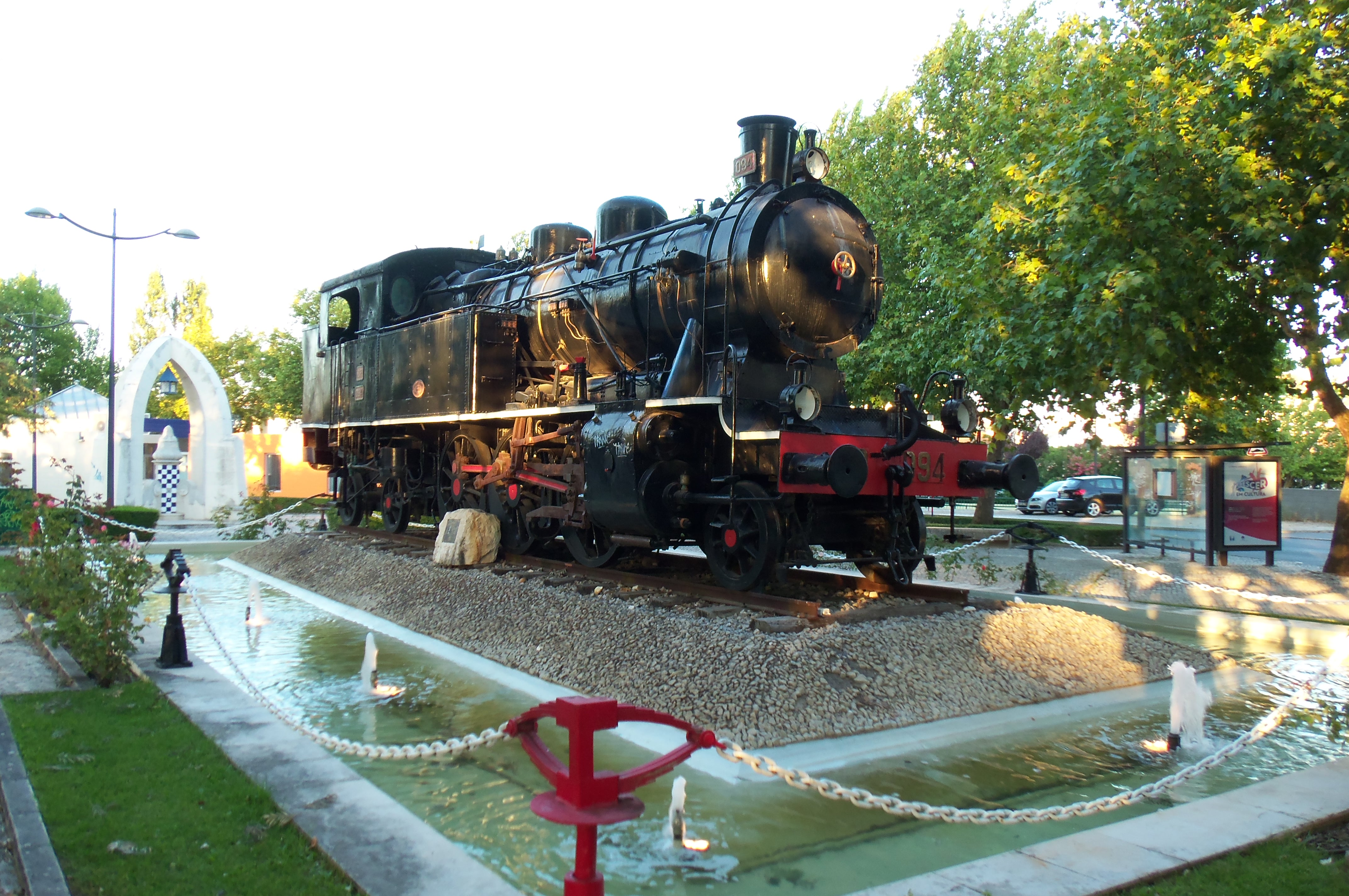
An example of one of the trains that helped build the civil parish that became municipality of Entroncamento

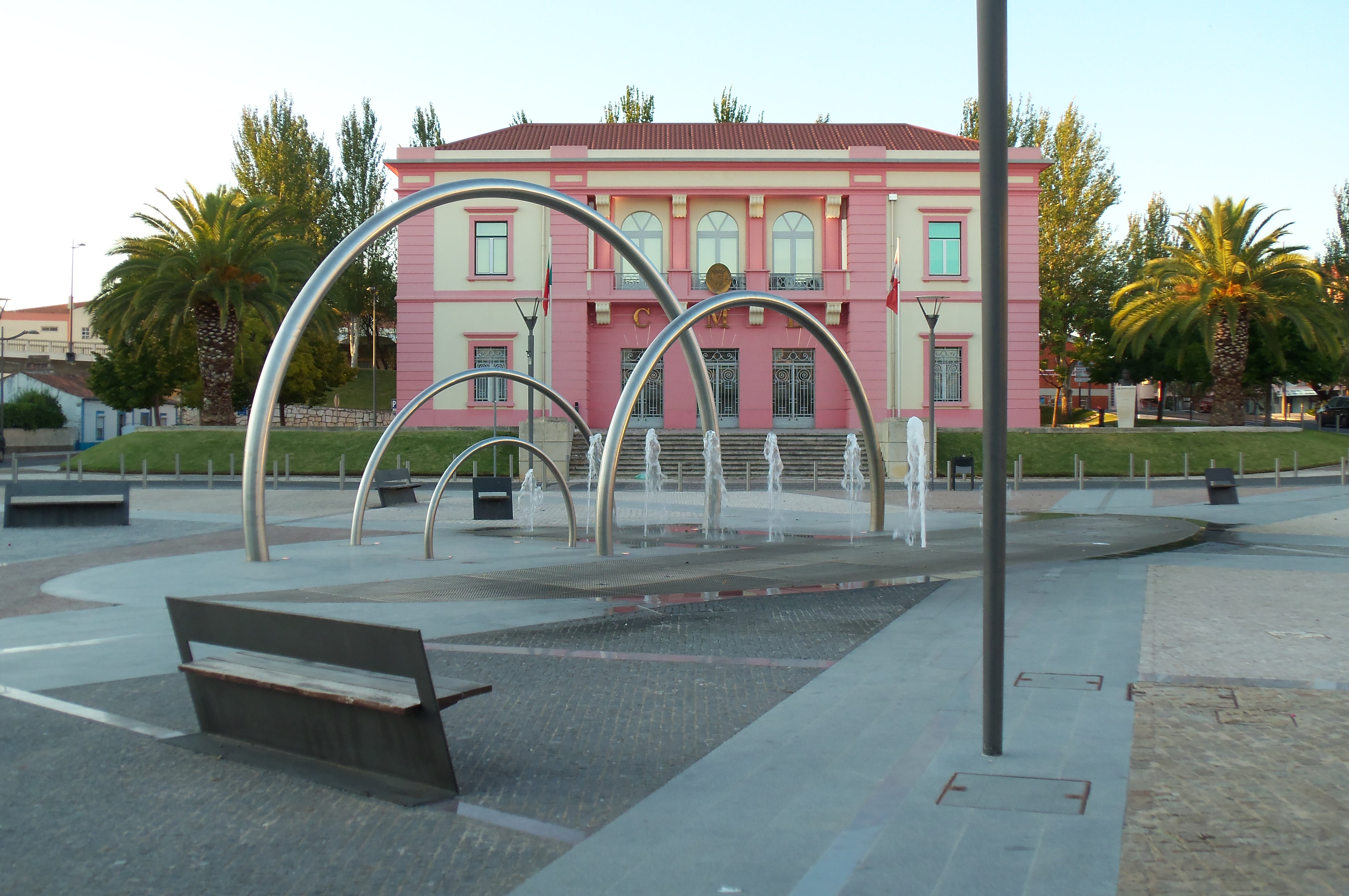
The simple two-storey building that became the municipal council building

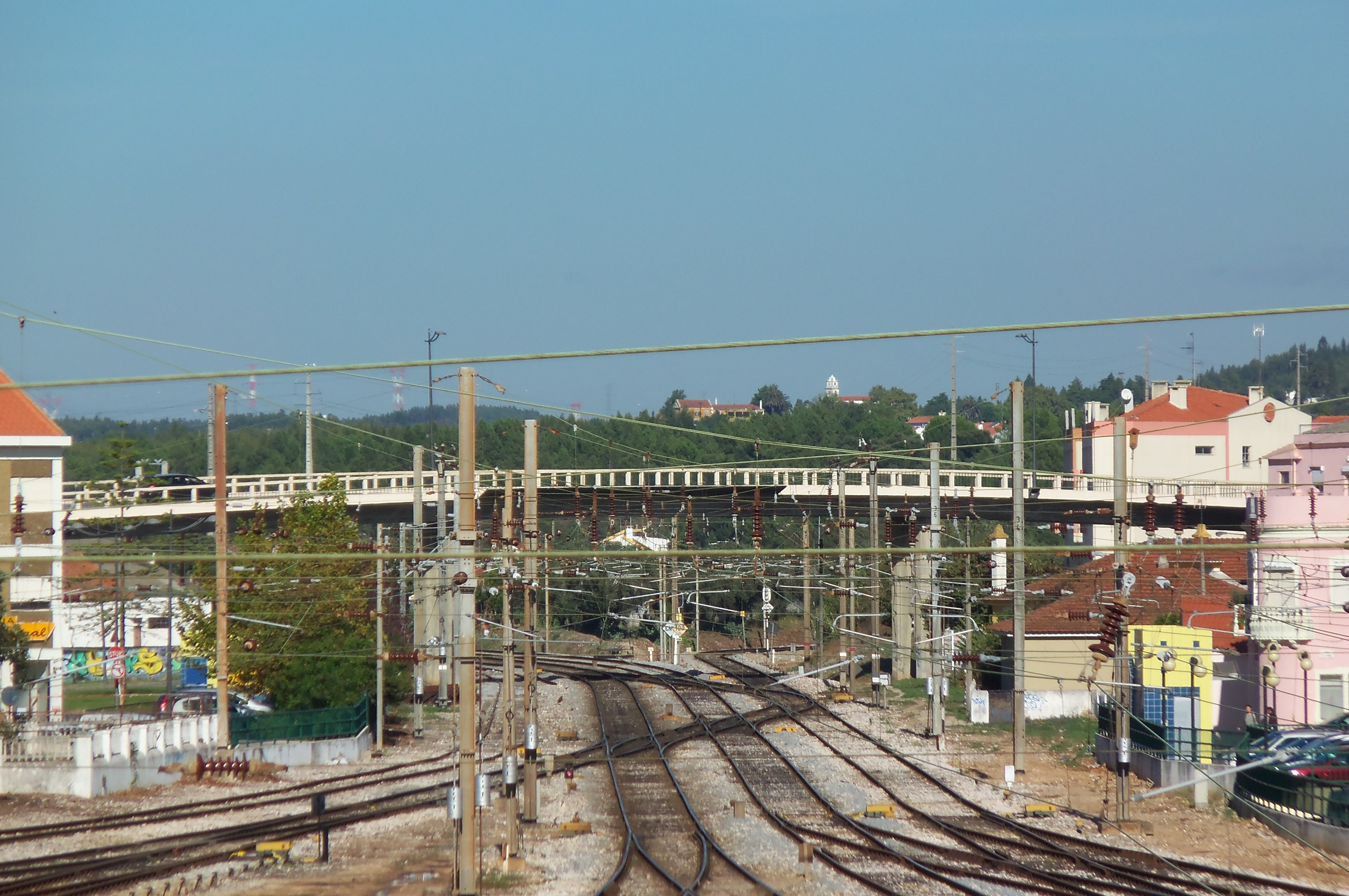
The Eugénio Dias Poitout Viaduct, and complex rail lines that divide the two civil parishes

Entroncamento originated in the middle of the 19th century, with the birth of the national railway network, as a simple train-stop, from two small railway construction camps: Casal das Vaginhas and Casal das Gouveias. The majority of the early rail workers/settlers were foreign, coming from different countries throughout Europe, but eventually workers from Beira Baixa and Alentejo moved to the region.

Its toponymic name Entroncamento literally means junction, due to the junction of the two railway lines that developed in 1864: the Linha do Norte (Northern Line) and the Linha do Leste (Eastern Line). Hinged between its links with the east and Beira Baixa, the station at Entroncamento, for many decades, was an obligatory stop that moved goods and people to the north and east. During this time, many celebrated travellers from Europe used the Eastern Line, dining in the station en route, such as the literary figures Hans Christian Andersen, Ramalho Ortigão, Eça de Queiroz, Alberto Pimentel, Luísa de Freitas Lomelino, and Eduardo Meneres. Political leaders also became frequent visitors both before and after the Carnation Revolution, such as João Chagas, politician and journalist, who travelled to Lisbon in order to assume the direction of the new government, after the dictatorship of General Pimenta de Castro.

For a long time, the two settlements were divided between two neighbouring municipalities, because the rail line itself determined its boundary. To the west of the lines were the parishes of Santiago (in Torres Novas), and to the east the territory was part of the parish of Nossa Senhora da Assunção da Atalaia (municipality of Vila Nova da Barquinha). The small settlement continued growing, owing to the development of rail transport and support structures, later the installation of military quarters (after 1916) determined the geographic accessibility, resulting in further influx of families.

On August 25, 1926, the settlement was recognised with the status of civil parish. By 1932, Entroncamento was given the urban designation of vila (town), and on November 24, 1945, it was elevated to the status of município (municipality). Until this date, its route to urban autonomy was a progressive emancipation, first separating from Torres Novas, and later from Barquinha: back then, it was also quite uncommon for a settlement to transform from village to town, then municipality, all within one century. From the small nucleus of families that started to populate the area, the 1930s registered approximately 3000 inhabitants and by 1945 there were 8000 residents. In March 2005, it was estimated the total population included 18,780 residents (calculation based on the number of election-age residents). The growth in the population and expansion resulted in the creation of two new civil parishes: Nossa Senhora de Fátima, to the west of the line, and São João Baptista, to the east.

In the 1950s, Entroncamento was, after Barreiro, the second largest railway centre, with almost half of its national employees. It was estimated that between the 1920s and 1930s, the Entroncamento population associated with the railway operator, CP Caminhos de Ferro Portugueses exceeded 50% of the local population. CP's corporate social responsibility program included the establishment of urban infrastructure to support its working population by the construction of neighbourhoods, building a school and warehousing, environmental work such as planting vegetation, as well as acting as a health center and dispensing anti-tuberculosis drugs to the citizens in need and additionally supporting sport activities. In parallel, the evolution of railway services along with supporting technologies, helped to reinforce the level of education and training, resulting in the creation of teaching centres such as FERNAVE, a subsidiary technical center that also worked in partnership with the Instituto Superior de Transportes (Superior Institute of Transportation).

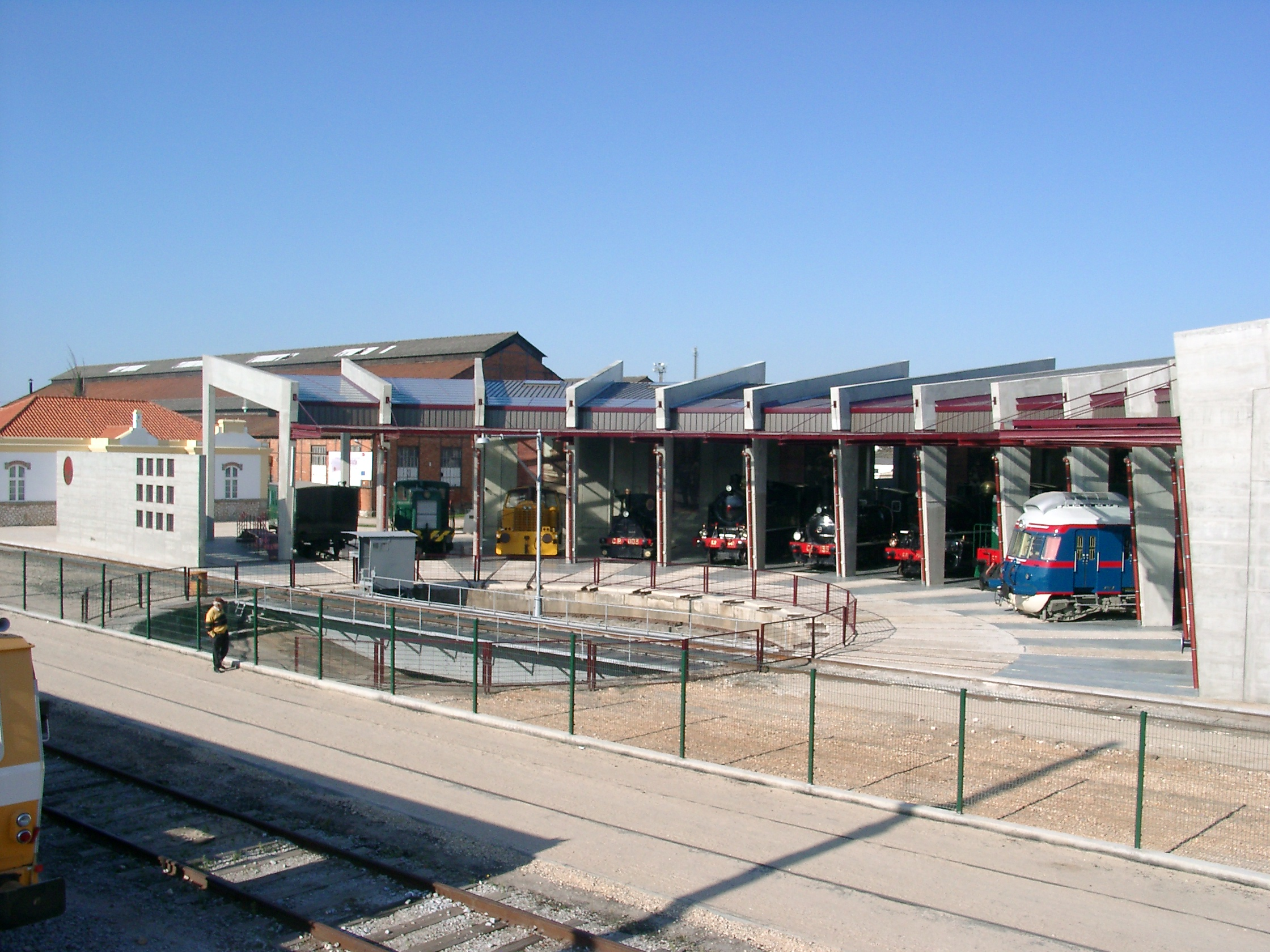
Locomotive roundhouse of the National Railway Museum

After the 1970s, changes began to occur with the gradual substitution of coal-powered steam locomotives to diesel and electric equipment. The introduction of new technologies caused some workers to lose their jobs, while the subsequent transformation of the company from labour-intensive methods to the newest technology-related services, offered others new opportunities. Lately, while Entroncamento continues to have an elevated number of professionals associated with the rail industry, its economic activities have shifted to commerce and the service sectors as well as industries associated with civil construction. The INE "Instituto Nacional de Estatísticas" statistics for 2004, indicated that Entroncamento continued to be the region with the largest purchasing power in the district of Santarém.

Conscious of its historical underpinnings, on November 24, 2004, the Entroncamento municipal authorities celebrating its anniversary, revised its municipal plan to include the construction of the Museu Nacional Ferroviário Armando Ginestal Machado and the creation of a foundation to manage its affairs, an aspiration that had been proposed in the 1970s. It opened on 18 May 2007.

== Geography ==
=== Physical geography ===
The municipality is surrounded by the neighbouring municipalities of Golegã (to the south), Torres Novas (to the west and north) and the municipality of Vila Nova da Barquinha (to the east); its centre is 7 kilometres (4.3 mi) from the centre of Torres Novas, 19 kilometres (12 mi) from Tomar, 43 kilometres (27 mi) from Santarém and 120 kilometres (75 mi) from the Portuguese capital, Lisbon.

=== Human geography ===
Population of Entroncamento (1849 - 2004)
Year	Pop.	±%
1950	6,804	—
1960	7,355	+8.1%
1981	11,976	+62.8%
1991	14,226	+18.8%
2001	18,174	+27.8%
2011	20,206	+11.2%

The growth rate, between 1981 and 1991, was 18.1%, considered the highest in the Médio Tejo region, in contrast to the national trend towards aging. Between 1991 and 1996, the population grew from 14,226 inhabitants to 15,500, although a lower growth rate (9%) than previously, it was still the community with the highest urban population density in the Médio Tejo region. The estimated current population (18,780), does not include residents still registered as living in other localities, nor fluctuating numbers of temporary workers. Effectively, Entroncamento maintains a population of over 20,000 inhabitants.

The municipality consists of two civil parishes (freguesias) that are principally divided by the national railway-line that crosses its territory from south-southwest to north-northeast:

- Nossa Senhora de Fátima
- São João Baptista

=== Twin towns & Sister cities ===
Along with its fraternal sister-city of Penafiel, Entroncamento is twinned with:

- Friedberg, Hesse, Germany
- Mosteiros, Cape Verde
- Villiers-sur-Marne, Paris, France

== Panorama ==
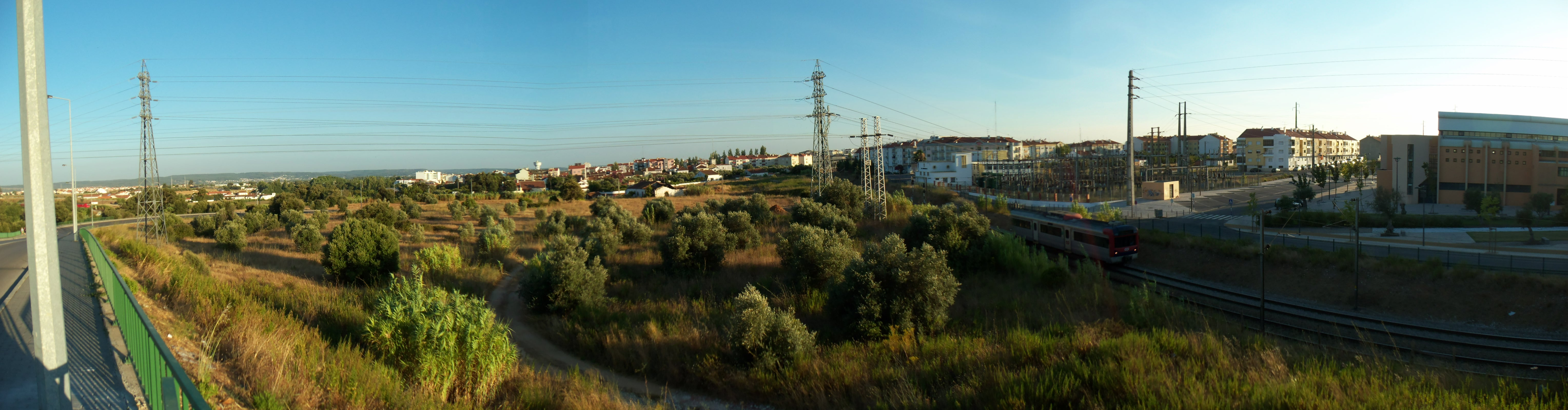
A panorama of the skyline of Entroncamento, showing the division between the two civil parishes: the rail-line

== Economy ==
The municipality decided to invest heavily in the implementation of primary fiber optic infrastructure links that can connect all municipal services, such as parish councils, sports complex, sports hall, schools, assembly chamber, library, cultural center, and additionally, future needs capacity to also enable installation of telemetry systems, video surveillance set up and the possible requirements for a FTTH network. - Fibra no Entroncamento

== Notable people ==
- Virgílio Mendes (1926 in Entroncamento – 2009) a footballer with 346 caps with FC Porto and 39 with Portugal

== Railway museum ==
- National Railway Museum
