= National Railway Museum (Portugal) =

National Railway Museum of Portugal
- Museu Nacional Ferroviário
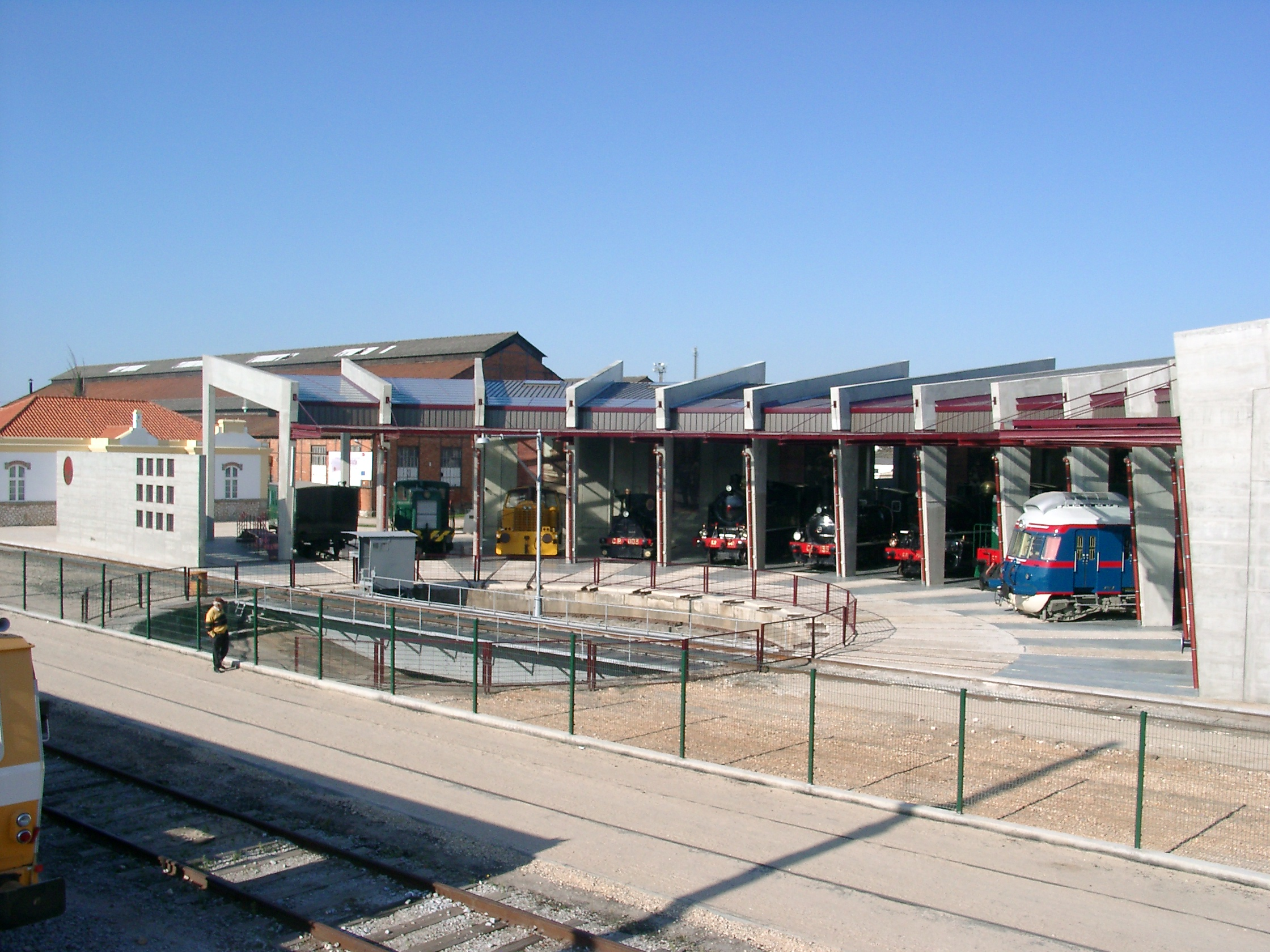
- Locomotive roundhouse of the National Railway Museum, Entroncamento
- Established: May 18, 2007
- Location: Entroncamento, Portugal
- Coordinates: 39°27′51″N 8°28′27″W
- Type: National railway museum
- Visitors: Daily (except Mondays) from 10:00 to 16:00
- Website: FMNF Official Website

The National Railway Museum of Portugal (Portuguese: Museu Nacional Ferroviário) has its headquarters and main base in the town of Entroncamento, which is also a major hub of the Portuguese rail network and the location of railway workshops. Smaller museums are located in other towns around the country.

The museum at Entroncamento was opened on 18 May 2007. It is open daily (except Mondays) from 10.00 to 16.00.

== See also ==
- Comboios de Portugal
- History of rail transport in Portugal
- Narrow gauge railways in Portugal
- List of National Railway Museums
