= National Railway Museum (disambiguation) =

The British National Railway Museum is in York, England.

National Railway Museum may also refer to:

== Africa ==
- Nairobi Railway Museum, Kenya
- South African National Railway And Steam Museum, South Africa
- Railway Museum (Zambia), Livingstone, Zambia
- Bulawayo Railway Museum, Zimbabwe

== Asia ==
- National Rail Museum, New Delhi, India

== Americas ==
- Canadian Railway Museum, Canada
- National Railway Museum (Peru), Tacna, Peru
- National Railroad Museum, Green Bay, Wisconsin, United States

== Europe ==
- Train World, Belgium
- Danish Railway Museum, Denmark
- Finnish Railway Museum, Finland
- Cité du Train, Mulhouse, France
- DB Museum, Germany, part of the Nuremberg Transport Museum
- Railway Museum of Athens, Greece
- Hungarian Railway History Park, Hungary
- Railway Museum (Netherlands) (Dutch National Railway Museum), Netherlands
- Norwegian Railway Museum, Norway
- National Railway Museum (Portugal), Portugal
- Slovenian Railway Museum, Ljubljana, Slovenia
- Railway Museum (Madrid), Spain
- Swedish Railway Museum, Gävle and Ängelholm, Sweden

== Elsewhere ==
- National Railway Museum, Port Adelaide, Adelaide, South Australia, Australia

== See also ==
- National Railway Museum Shildon, a co-museum of the UK's National Railway Museum, now called Locomotion
