= Global Education Magazine =

Peer-reviewed transdisciplinary journal

- Type: Quarterly
- Founded: 2012
- Language: All
- ISSN: 2255-033X
- Website: www.globaleducationmagazine.com

Global Education Magazine is a quarterly peer-reviewed journal formed in 2012 by a group of cognitive analysts. The journal focuses on global education. Each edition has a different theme, published on specified days by the United Nations to address issues such as violence, poverty, health or refugees.

== Editions ==
- International Day for the Eradication of Poverty, October 17, 2012. Dedicated to the 15 million people who die annually by hunger or curable diseases.
- School Day of Non-Violence and Peace, January 30, 2013. With the anniversary of the death of Mahatma Gandhi, this edition is focused on the fight against violence and the promotion of peace at the schools.
- World Health Day, April 7, 2013. Celebrating World Day for the promotion of Internationalhealth, this edition discusses projects under the Millennium Development Goals to eradicate curable diseases and improve the quality of life in the poorest countries.
