= Universidad Argentina de la Empresa =

Private university in Argentina

Argentine University of Enterprise
- Universidad Argentina de la Empresa
- Motto: Una gran universidad
- Motto in English: A great university
- Type: Private, non-profit
- Established: 1963; 63 years ago
- President: Dr. Héctor Masoero
- Vice-president: Carlos San Millán
- Rector: Ricardo Orosco
- Academic staff: More than 2,100
- Students: 51,729
- Location: Buenos Aires, Argentina; 34.6167°S 58.3817°W
- Campus: Campus Buenos Aires Campus Costa Argentina
- Colors
- Website: www.uade.edu.ar

The Argentine University of Enterprise (Spanish: Universidad Argentina de la Empresa, mostly known for its acronym UADE) is a private, non-profit university in Buenos Aires, Argentina. It was founded by the Argentine Chamber of Corporations. Since 2003, the university's primary faculties have included the Faculty of Economic Sciences, the Faculty of Engineering and Exact Sciences, the Faculty of Law, and the Faculty of Communication. UADE is recognized by the QS Quacquarelli Symonds as one of the top private non-profit universities in Buenos Aires, Argentina.

The university was created with the purpose of educating professionals to meet the evolving needs of present and future companies.

It has campuses in the city of Buenos Aires and Pinamar (Buenos Aires Province), as well as academic sites in the neighborhoods of Recoleta and Belgrano. The Buenos Aires campus features 75,000 square metres (810,000 sq ft) of classrooms, laboratories, library, sports centre, theatre, food court and a residence hall. As of 2024, it had more than 42,000 undergraduate and postgraduate students and more than 2,100 professors.

UADE has cooperation agreements with over 100 companies and universities worldwide. More than 3,600 companies seek professionals from UADE and it has 1,300 internship agreements with top-tier companies.

== History ==
UADE was founded in 1957 by members of the Cámara Argentina de Sociedades Anónimas as the Instituto Superior de Estudios de la Empresa. Its activities began in the building of Belgrano Av. 687 under the direction of Dr. Jacobo Wainer. 338 business executives enrolled. The first class was delivered by Dr. Anwar Obeid. At the end of that year, the Institute became the Argentina Foundation for Advanced Business Studies. Around 500 business leaders completed the course in 1958 and the following year, at the Plaza Hotel in Buenos Aires, the course for 1959 was opened. In the context of the Law 14,557 of 1958 authorizing the operation of private universities in the country, the Chamber of Corporations decided to create the Universidad Argentina de la Empresa, whose statutes were approved by that institution on June 7, 1963, and the National Executive Power on August 27 of that year.

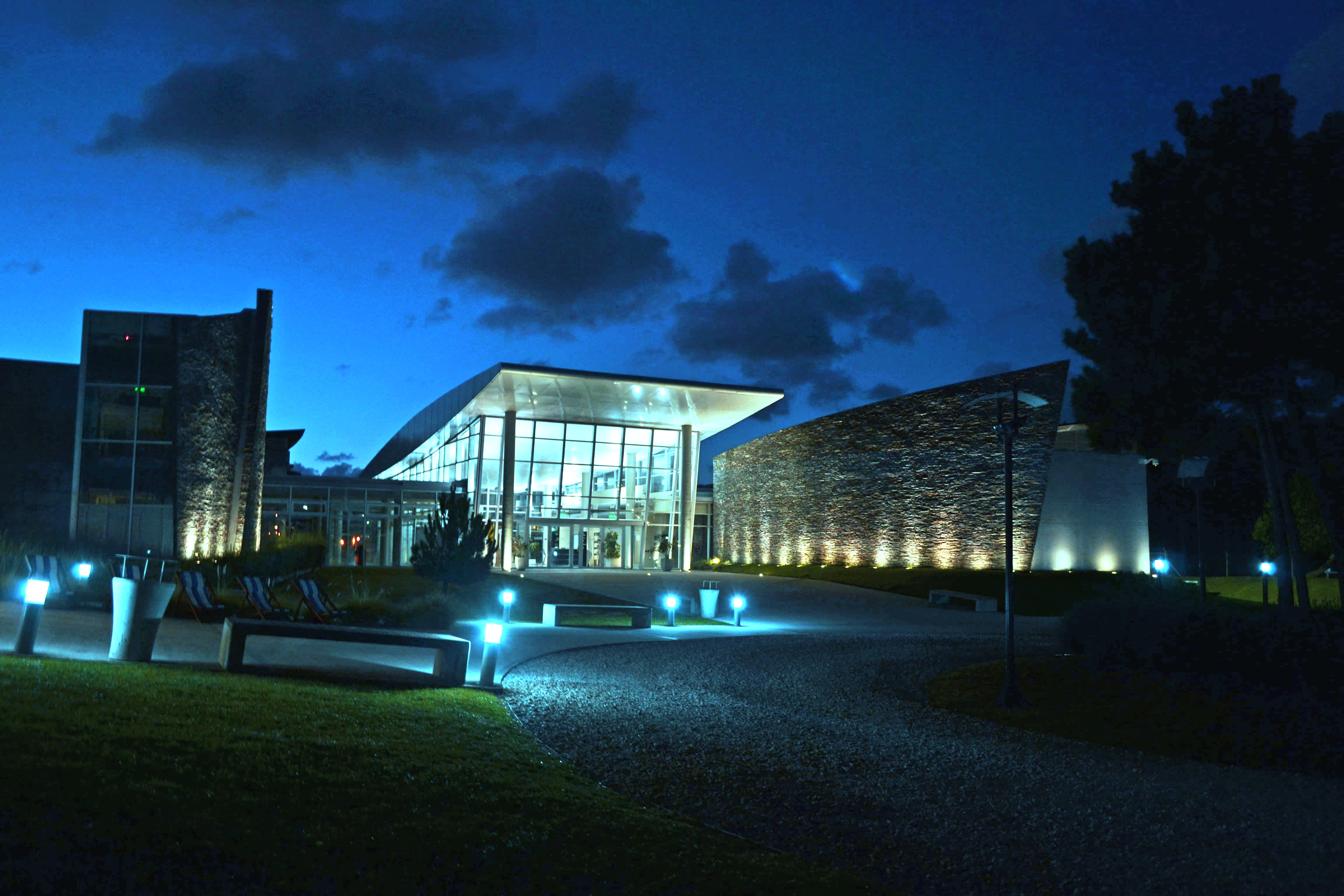
Image of the Costa Argentina Campus, located in the city of Pinamar

In 1963, the first degrees were offered in areas of special interest for business: "Marketing," "Costs", "Finance and Organisation", "Organisation of Production" and "Industrial Relations" . In 1964 other degrees were added, such as "Business Applied Statistics", "Market Research", "Public Relations", "Management Techniques" and "Production Engineering and Construction Organization."

In 1968, the Universidad Argentina de la Empresa joined the Council of Rectors of Private Universities (CRUP), after Law 17,604 passed in that year.

In 1984, the main building at Lima St. 717 was inaugurated and, subsequently, in 1992, 1993, 1997, and 1998 new buildings were added to create the current building complex on Lima St. In 2000, the Faculty and Alumni Club was added in an annex building on Chile St. In 2003, the School of Management was opened on Libertad St. 1340. In 2005, the UADE University Residence was opened, which is capable of housing 105 people.

In 2008, the Urban Campus UADE was opened. The campus includes a residence hall, a model library, a cultural and exhibition centre, a sports facility, and a microstadium with capacity for 1,200 people, which with the 181 classrooms and laboratories account for more than 75,000 square metres (810,000 sq ft).

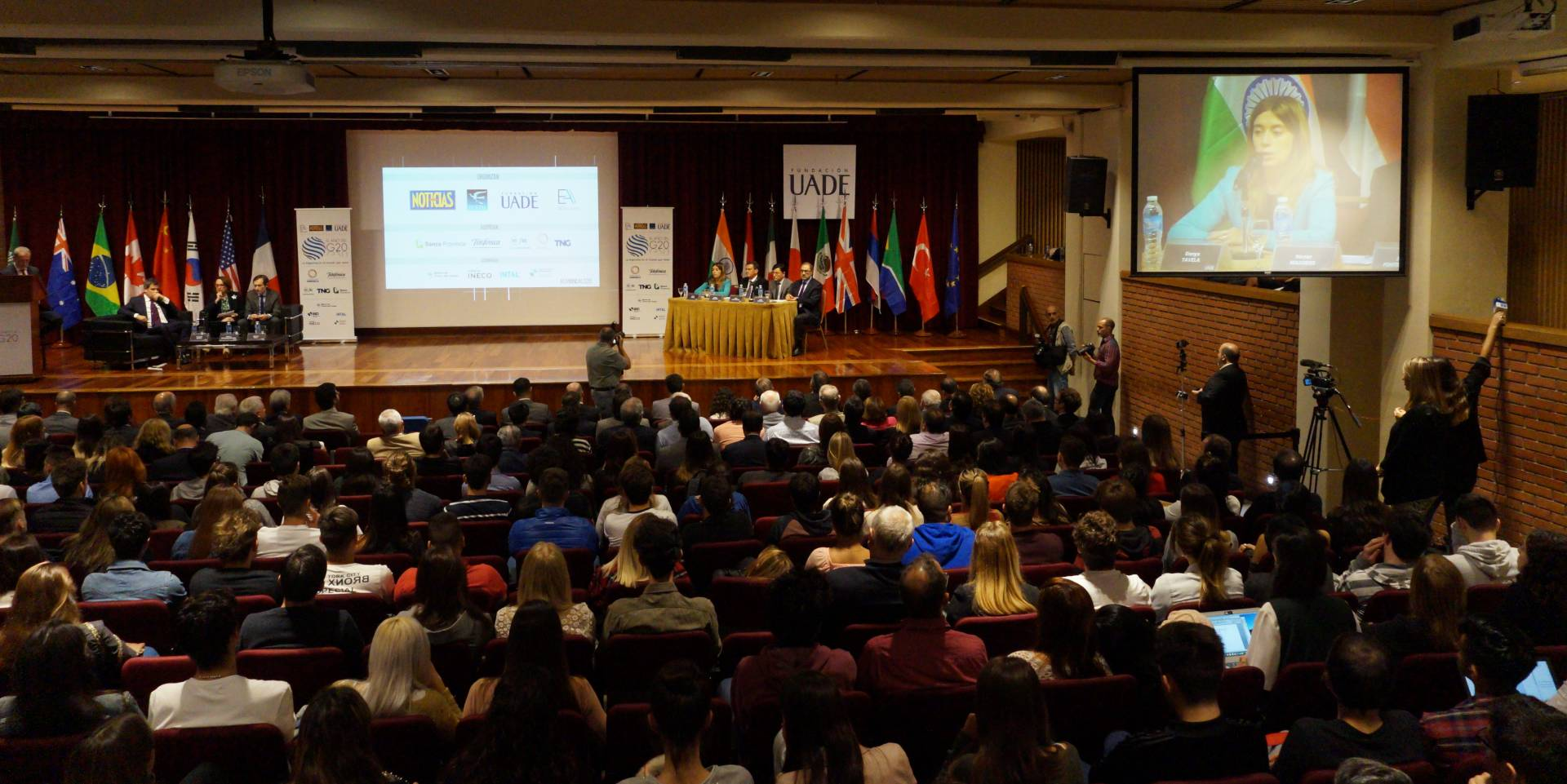
UADE Auditorium (Aula Magna)

The UADE Labs were set up in May 2010. This is a building of 9000 m2 which is presented to national and regional level as the first integrated university laboratory building in the country. In it, students in 51 undergraduate and graduate programs will attend 60,000 hours of practice and research annually.

It is recognized worldwide by the Association of Collegiate Business Schools and Programs (ACBSP), the Institute of Food Technologists (IFT), the Public Relations Society of America (PRSA), International Advertising Association (IAA) and Tourism Education Quality (UNWTO).

== Undergraduate degrees ==
Complete list of degree programs:

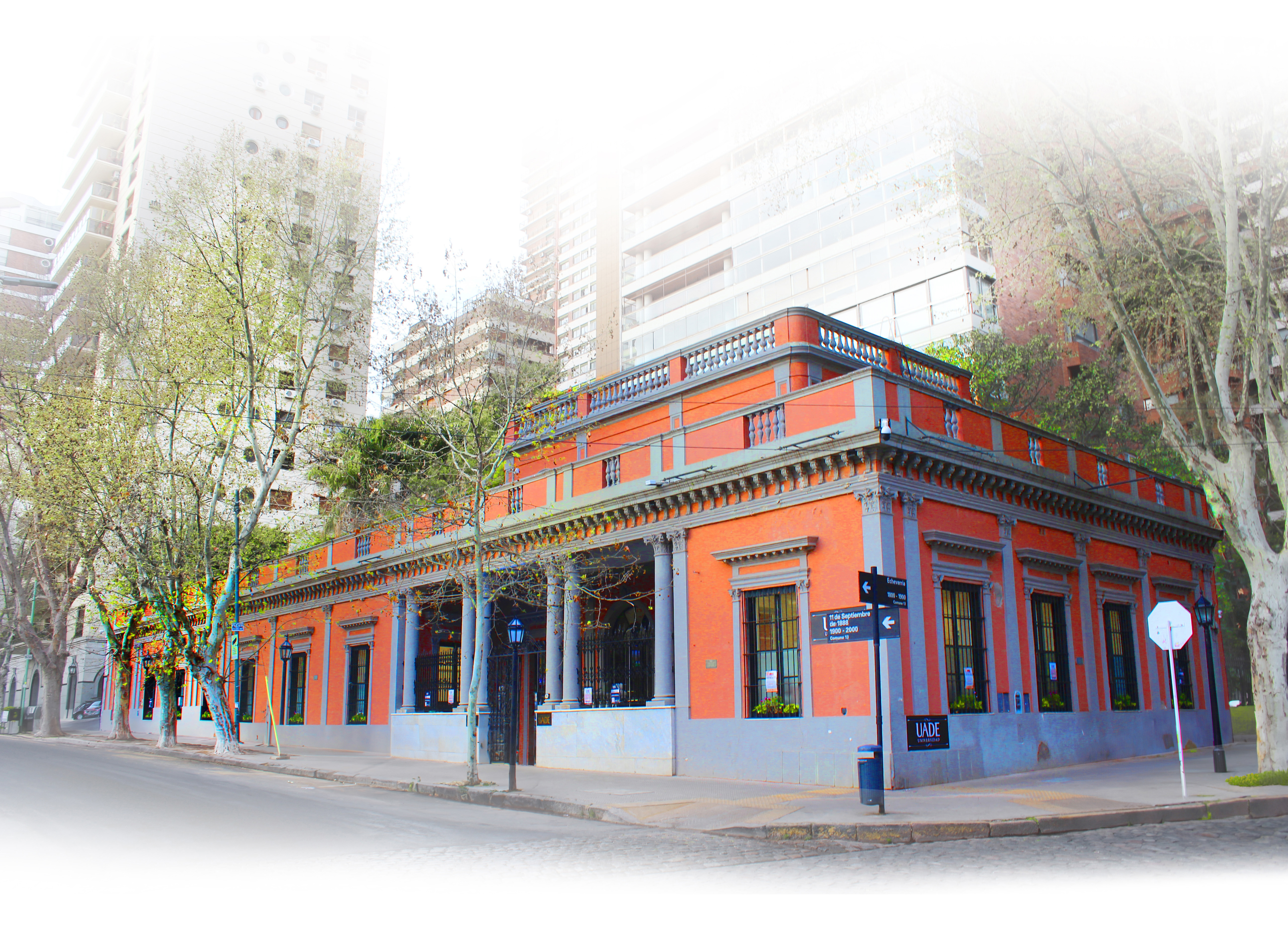
Casa Alsina, academic site in Belgrano

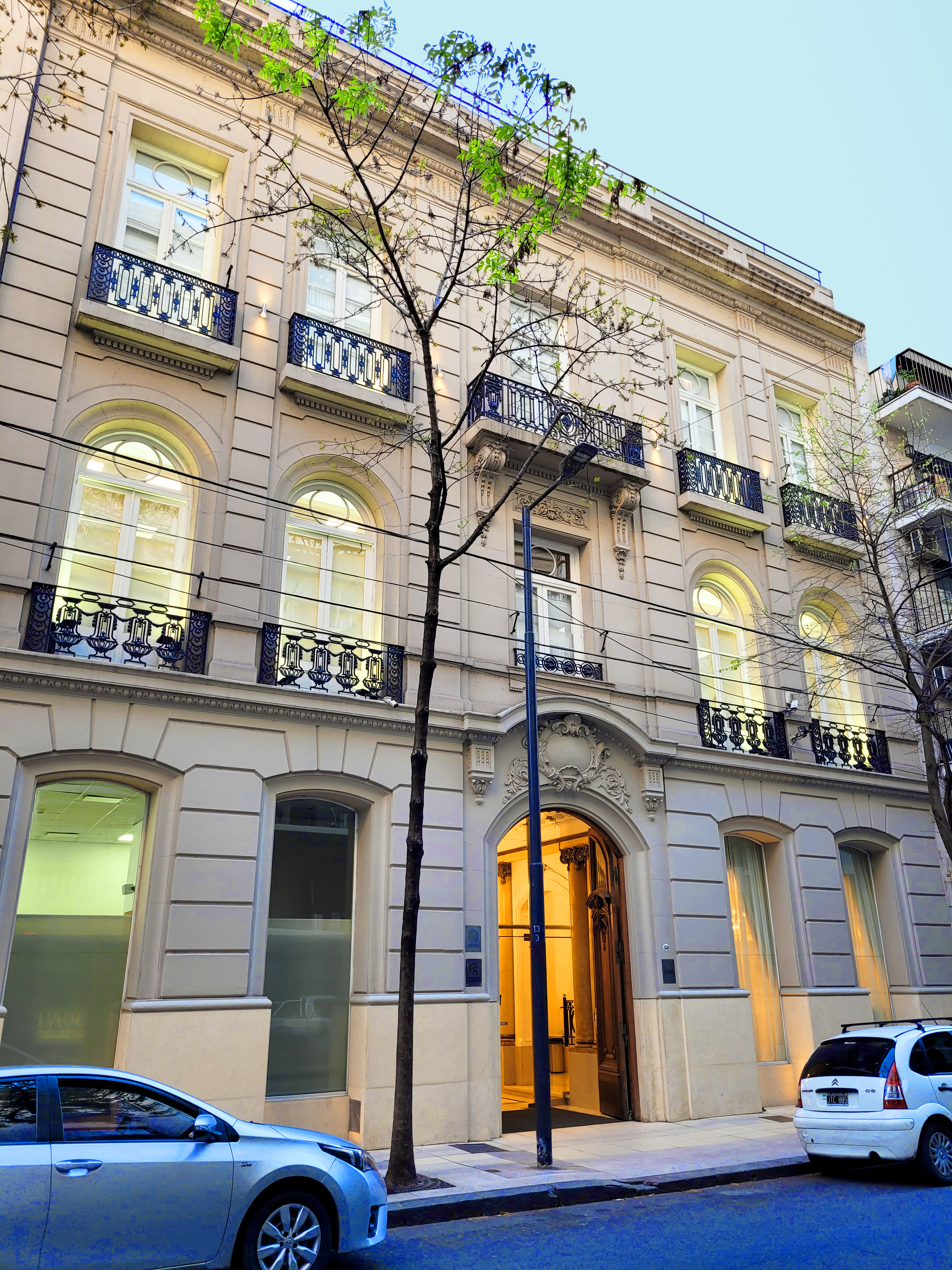
Academic site in the Recoleta, inaugurated as a Business School in 2003

Mauricio Macri speaking at UADE

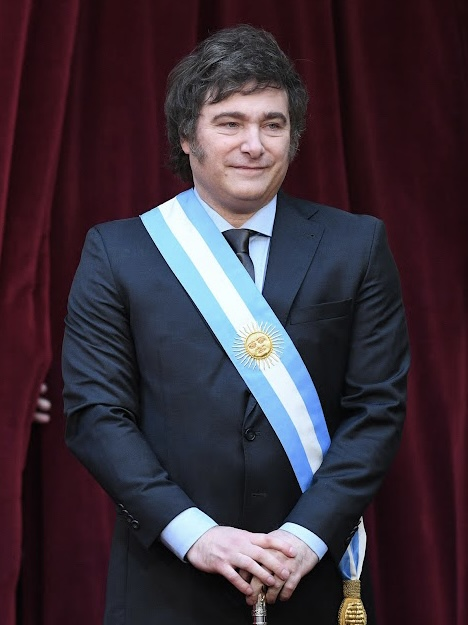
Javier Milei, current President of Argentina, taught an upper-level Monetary and Fiscal policy class at the university until 2013.

=== School of Architecture and Design ===
- BA in Architecture
- BA in Audiovisual Design
- BA in Interior Design
- BA in Graphic Design
- BA in Industrial Design
- BA in Multimedia and Interaction Design
- BA in Textile and Apparel Design
- BA in Design and Management of Aesthetics for Fashion
- BA in Interactive Product Design and Virtual Reality

=== School of Communication ===
- BA in Performing Arts
- BA in Communication Sciences
- BA in Digital and Interactive Communication
- BA in Global Communication
- BA in Gastronomy
- BA in Media and Entertainment Management
- BA in Advertising
- BA in Public and Institutional Relations
- BA in Tourism and Hotel Management
- BA in Sports Management
- BA in Electronic Sports
- Degree in Sports Journalism

=== School of Economics ===
- BA in Accountancy
- BA in Business Management
- BA in Marketing
- BA in International Trade
- BA in Global Business Management
- BA in Global Finance Management
- BA in Economics
- BA in Finance
- BA in Human Resources
- BA in Digital Business

=== School of Engineering and Science ===
- BA in Environmental Management
- BA in Information Technology Management
- BA in Bioinformatics
- BA in Biotechnology
- BA in Electronic Engineering
- BA in Computer Engineering
- BA in Electromechanic Engineering
- BA in Food Engineering
- BA in Food Industrial Technology
- BA in Video Game Development
- BA in Industrial Engineering
- BA in Agricultural Production and Management
- BA in Telecommunications Engineering

=== School of Law and Social Sciences ===
- BA in Law
- BA in Government and International Relations
- BA in Politics and Public Administration
- BA in Public Translation in English Language
- BA in Criminology and Cybercrime

=== School of Health Sciences ===
- BA in Health Services Management
- BA in Nutrition
- BA in Psychology

== Postgraduate ==
Complete list of degree programs:

- PhD in Economics
- Master of Business Administration
- Master in Institutional Communications Management
- Master of Finance and Control Management
- Master of Human Resources Management
- Master in Strategic Information Management
- Master of Business Management
- Master of Business Law
- Master of Applied Economics
- Master of Information Technology and Communications

== Investigation ==
At UADE, research activities are articulated and managed through the Research Coordination, a unit that reports on the Academic Secretary of the university. Research activities are developed within the framework of 3 Institutes: the Institute of Economics (INECO), the Institute of Technology (INTEC) and the Institute of Social Sciences and Project Disciplines (INSOD).

== Ranking ==
According to the QS World University Rankings, UADE is ranked #1001-1200 best university globally. Making it one of the 16 Argentine universities included in the global ranking.

In the QS World University Rankings: Latin America and the Caribbean 2027, UADE ranked 139th in the region, climbing 12 positions from the previous year. This represented the largest improvement among Argentine universities in that edition, partly attributed to improved performance in citations per paper.

In the same regional ranking, UADE placed 11th in Latin America and the Caribbean for faculty-to-student ratio, making it one of four Argentine private universities ranked among the region's top 20 institutions for that indicator.
