= International Year of Peace =

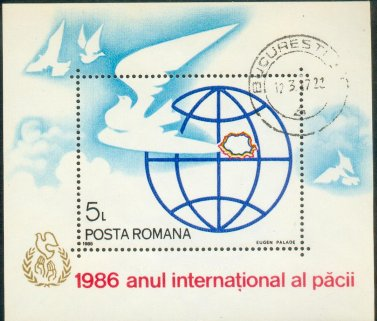
1986 stamp issued by Romania marking the International Year of Peace

The International Year of Peace was recognized in 1986 by the United Nations. It was first proposed during the UN conference of November 1981 by the United Nations Economic and Social Council, with a date associated with the fortieth anniversary of the establishment of the UN.

== Red Cross support ==
During its twenty-fifth conference, in 1986, the Red Cross recognized the International Year of Peace. In its twenty-seventh resolution of that conference, the Red Cross emphasized its goal "to prevent and alleviate human suffering, protect life and health and to promote lasting peace and international co-operation".

== Baháʼí Faith support ==
In January 1985 the Universal House of Justice, the head institution of the Baháʼí Faith, sent a letter to all national assemblies, with responsibilities in hundreds of countries for the religion, to specify goals for the community for the International Year of Peace. These goals included sponsoring activities about the theme of peace which is a priority of the religion: to engage the attention of people to relevant topics related to peace, a publicity campaign encouraging these goals, publishing new literature, and already existing serial publications on the subject, Baháʼí radio stations to devote programming on it, the Association for Baháʼí Studies to devote scholarly activities on it, the encouragement of artists and musicians in their contribution and that they should invite colleagues to the work. Since its inception the Baháʼí Faith has had involvement in socio-economic development beginning by giving greater freedom to women, promulgating the promotion of female education as a priority concern, often in some practical expression such as by creating schools, agricultural coops, and clinics.

The Baháʼí department of statistics released the following summary of projects accomplished:

Baháʼí Social and Economic Development Programs
| Programs | World | Africa | Americas | Asia | Australasia | Europe |
|---|---|---|---|---|---|---|
| Education(Tutorial/Academic/Other) | 732 | 169 | 115 | 427 | 13 | 8 |
| Health & Social Services | 78 | 28 | 14 | 25 | 2 | 9 |
| Radio Stations | 5 | 0 | 5 | 0 | 0 | 0 |
| Agriculture & Forestry | 74 | 35 | 13 | 20 | 5 | 1 |
| Community Development | 358 | 60 | 266 | 12 | 7 | 13 |
| Total | 1247 | 292 | 413 | 484 | 27 | 31 |

=== Some particular examples ===
- The Universal House of Justice released its statement, The Promise of World Peace. As of January 1988, the peace statement had been presented to 198 heads of state, 75 directly and 123 indirectly. The statement had been translated into 76 languages and millions of copies disseminated to people around the world. Some specifics by country were listed in 9 pages of the February 1988 issue of the Baháʼí News.
- The Baháʼí International Community offered a number of statements to various committees of the UN.
- A ten-day Peace Exposition was held by the Australian Baháʼís at the Baháʼí House of Worship in Sydney on "Religions for World Peace", attended by 1,350 people including prominent dignitaries, and there was also a special service for children.
- The Territory of Guam adopted a resolution citing "the International Year of Peace as designated for 1986 by the United Nations, the promise of world peace as exemplified by the Baháʼí Faith, and acknowledging the importance of world peace to everyone…"
- More than 300 people attended a peace conference in Honolulu, Hawaii, sponsored by the International Year of Peace Committee of the National Spiritual Assembly of the Hawaiian Islands as a kick-off event.
- About 300 people attended a symposium on "Peace Through a New Consciousness" sponsored in Mannheim by the Baháʼí Club at the local university. A panel of speakers took part, including the head of the faculty of social work at Heidelberg, a cultural editor for German television, and a political journalist.
- A "World Peace Conference" sponsored by the National Spiritual Assembly of India was held January 19 in New Delhi. Planned as an observance of the International Year of Peace and as a tribute to the late Dr. Martin Luther King Jr., the conference served also as a means of introducing the Universal House of Justice's peace statement to many of India's personages and to a large gathering of university students. Special guest speaker was Nagendra Singh, then president of the International Court of Justice. The audience of more than 550 overflowed the Vigyan Bhavan Conference Hall, a prestigious site for international gatherings.
- A Media Peace Prize, awarded by the New Zealand Foundation for Peace Studies, was presented this year to Dianne Stogre-Power, a member of the National Spiritual Assembly of New Zealand, and her non-Baháʼí partner, Robyn Hunt, who as radio journalists earned national acclaim by producing a two-part documentary on the history of peace-making in New Zealand.
- The Local Youth Committee of Karachi, Pakistan, held a symposium on "Youth and World Peace" at the Baháʼí Hall in Karachi. Among the speakers was then Senator Javed Jabbar.
- The 11th annual Conference of the Association for Baháʼí Studies, held August 20–24 at the University of Western Ontario in London, Ontario, Canada, was the largest such gathering to date, with about 2,000 adults taking part was focused on the theme "Beyond the Quest for Peace: Creating a New World Order". Speakers included Hand of the Cause Rúhíyyih Khanum, then Continental Counselor Adib Taherzadeh, music and presentations by Dr. Ervin László and others. It was followed by a Native American peace pipe ceremony, in which Ruhiyyih Khanum, Dr. and Mrs. Laszlo, and other dignitaries took part.
- A peace tree and bench were dedicated by the Baháʼís of White Plains NY to the civic government overcoming various difficulties with the help of neighboring communities.
- An extensive summary of the world-wide activities was presented in the September 1987 issue of Baháʼí News, pages 1–18.
- A symbolic tree for peace was planted on New Year's Day in Dublin's Stephen's Green by Irish Nobel Peace Prize laureate Sean McBride; the event was organised by the all-Ireland Irish Peace Council which planned other events during the year.

== Chinese support ==
The song Tomorrow Will Be Better was first created for it. Music concerts about it were held in Beijing and Hong Kong.

== The logo ==
The logo of the International Year of Peace is two hands releasing a white dove surrounded by a laurel crown similar to the UN emblem. This logo appears in different postage stamps and on the advertising board during the 1986 FIFA World Cup in Mexico.

== See also ==
- Culture of Peace
- International Relations
- International Day of Peace
- International Year for the Culture of Peace
