= David Adams (peace activist) =

American peace activist (born 1939)

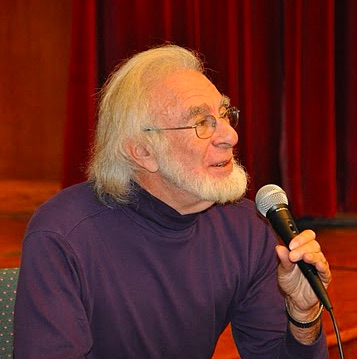
David Adams

David Adams (born 1939) is an American peace activist, scientist, scholar, writer and journalist. As a professor at Wesleyan University he ran a brain research laboratory and published many scientific articles. Adams then served at UNESCO, where he worked on the Culture of Peace initiative that eventually led to the International Year for the Culture of Peace.

Adams is currently the Coordinator of the Culture of Peace News Network and author of several books on this subject.

== Biography ==
David Adams went to Columbia University from 1957 to 1962 where he studied literature and wrote novels (Master of the House and Peace) and poetry ("Page Poems"). He obtained his doctorate in psychology at Yale University 1962–1968 with a dissertation later published in Science Magazine as "Cells Related to Fighting Behavior Recorded from Midbrain Central Gray Neuropil of Cat". Then, as Assistant, Associate and Full Professor at Wesleyan University, Adams continued working on the brain mechanisms of aggression, and initiated studies which would underlie the concept of the Culture of Peace.

As an activist against the war in Vietnam, Adams was an editor of the newspaper Modern Times (1970–1976). Later. as an activist in the Nuclear Freeze movement, he was one of the organizers of the Peoples Peace Appeal (1986–1987) which obtained hundreds of thousands of signatures in the United States and millions in the Soviet Union in an effort to end the Cold War. In a similar spirit, he helped organize the World Wide Runners Club for Peace that was active for a few years beginning in 1982.

Concerned about mass media claims of a biological basis for war, he worked with the International Society for Research on Aggression to initiate a process leading to the Seville Statement on Violence which showed scientifically that war is not biologically determined and, to quote Margaret Mead, "the same species that invented war is capable of inventing peace." He was responsible for the newsletter of the Seville Statement from 1986 to 1994, a history of its origins and effects, as well as a study showing that if one believes that war is not biologically determined, one is more likely to work for peace.

From 1992 until 2001 Adams worked with UNESCO as counselor, professional and director on the Culture of Peace, leading to the International Year for the Culture of Peace for which he was chair of its Taskforce. Since retiring from UNESCO, he coordinated the midterm and final Reports from the Civil Society for the International Decade for a Culture of Peace and Non-Violence for the Children of the World and he has coordinated the Culture of Peace News Network and written books on the culture of war and the culture of peace.

Adams lives with his wife, Kiki Chauvin Adams, in Normandy, (France).

== Scientific career ==
While at Wesleyan University, Adams worked with Harry Sinnamon and students to understand the brain mechanisms of aggressive behavior. A related work with Jonathan Mink and Rob Blumenschine was able to show a general rule that most vertebrate species devote between 2% and 8% of basal metabolism to the brain. Among the few exceptions are the great apes and humans that use more and domesticated animals that have been selected to use less. Also at Wesleyan, along with colleague Alice Gold, it was shown that there is a rise in female-initiated sexual activity at the time of ovulation, which is suppressed by the use of oral contraception. At this time he also began working on studies that would lead to the Seville Statement on Violence and that would underlie the concept of the culture of peace: for example, the study Why There Are So Few Women Warriors.

== Culture of Peace ==
The Culture of Peace is a "set of values, attitudes, modes of behavior and ways of life that reject violence and prevent conflicts by tackling their root causes to solve problems through dialogue and negotiation among individuals groups and nations."

The Culture of Peace was first proposed by Father Felipe Mac Gregor for UNESCO at the 1989 Yamoussoukro Conference on Peace in the Minds of Men where David Adams presented the Seville Statement on Violence When Federico Mayor, a signatory of the Seville Statement, was elected as Director-General of UNESCO, David went to UNESCO in 1992 to publicize the Statement, including a brochure, subtitled, "Preparing the Ground for the Constructing of Peace". Within that context, he worked with Director-General Mayor, Georges Kutukdjian and Ambassador Ahmed Sayyad to propose the Culture of Peace Programme. In 1994, he left his University Post in order to establish the UNESCO Culture of Peace Programme under Director-General Mayor and Director Leslie Atherley, and along with Firmin Edouard Matoko. From 1993 until 1996 he worked on the establishment of national culture of peace programs, including those of El Salvador and Mozambique. In 1995 he prepared a book for UNESCO entitled UNESCO and a Culture of Peace: Promoting a Global Movement.

In 1998 Adams was named director of the unit for the International Year for the Culture of Peace. Along with Enzo Fazzino and a small team, largely volunteer, and with the full assistance of Director-General Federico Mayor, they developed a publicity campaign for the Manifesto 2000. The manifesto had been composed by a team of Nobel Peace Laureates convened by the peace activist Pierre Marchand. The Manifesto 2000 was signed by 75 million people, one percent of planet earth, most of the signatures gathered by the more than a thousand organizations formally engaged by the International Year for the Culture of Peace, making it perhaps the largest such peace initiative in United Nations history.

Another task of the International Year for the Culture of Peace team was the preparation of a draft declaration and programme of action on a culture of peace that had been requested by the United Nations General Assembly. The document was adopted by the UN General Assembly as Resolution A/53/243 after ten months of difficult negotiation that were managed by Ambassador Anwarul Chowdhury of Bangladesh. At that time, the significance of the programme was discussed in a scholarly article authored by Adams with Director-General Federico Mayor. Also at that time, with the assistance of Zeynep Varoglu, Di Bretherton and Takehiko Ito, a news network was initiated that later became the Culture of Peace News Network. His personal memoir of the early history of the culture of peace has been published on the Internet.

Since retiring from UNESCO, Adams has coordinated the further development of the Culture of Peace News Network as well as the Reports from the Civil Society for the International Decade for a Culture of Peace and Non-Violence for the Children of the World. He has published a number of books on the Culture of Peace and is invited to lecture on this subject in Europe, Africa and Latin America as well as the United States and Canada.

== Publications ==
Adams has published over 60 articles in scientific journals, many of which are included in the internet book The Aggression Systems.

=== Books ===
- Master of the House, Amazon 2018
- Peace, Amazon 2019
- Page Poems, Amazon 2019
- The American Peace Movements, Advocate Press, 1985
- The Seville Statement on Violence: Preparing the Ground for the Constructing of Peace UNESCO 1991
- Psychology for Peace Activists, Amazon 1995
- UNESCO and a Culture of Peace: Promoting a Global Movement, UNESCO 1995
- The History of the Culture of War, Amazon, 2009
- I Have Seen the Promised Land: A Utopian Novella, Amazon, 2009
- j'ai vu la terre promise: une nouvelle utopique (French Edition), Amazon, 2009
- World Peace through the Town Hall, Amazon, 2015
- Embrace the Fire: Plant the Seeds for a Culture of Peace, Amazon 2015
- Cultura de Paz: Una utopía posible (translation by Roberto Mercadillo), Herder Editorial 2015
- Early History of Culture of Peace, Self Published 2024

== See also ==
- List of peace activists
