= Global Campaign for Peace Education =

The Global Campaign for Peace Education (GCPE) is an international network which aims at encouraging both transnational co-operation and local initiatives in peace education. The Campaign originated with the 1999 Hague Agenda (Appeal) for Peace and was associated with the UN culture of peace initiatives and specifically the International Year for the Culture of Peace. The peace educator Betty Reardon is credited with being instrumental in establishing the Campaign. The Campaign has a number of ongoing initiatives, such as the Peace Education Global Knowledge Clearinghouse, one of the world's largest and regularly updated collections of research on peace education, and the Mapping Peace Education Project, which aims to provide a visual map of where peace education is happening globally. The Campaign is currently a member of the Union of International Associations, organization ID XK1939, and in 2021 was a nominee for the Nobel Peace Prize.
