= International Day of Non-Violence =

Annual celebration

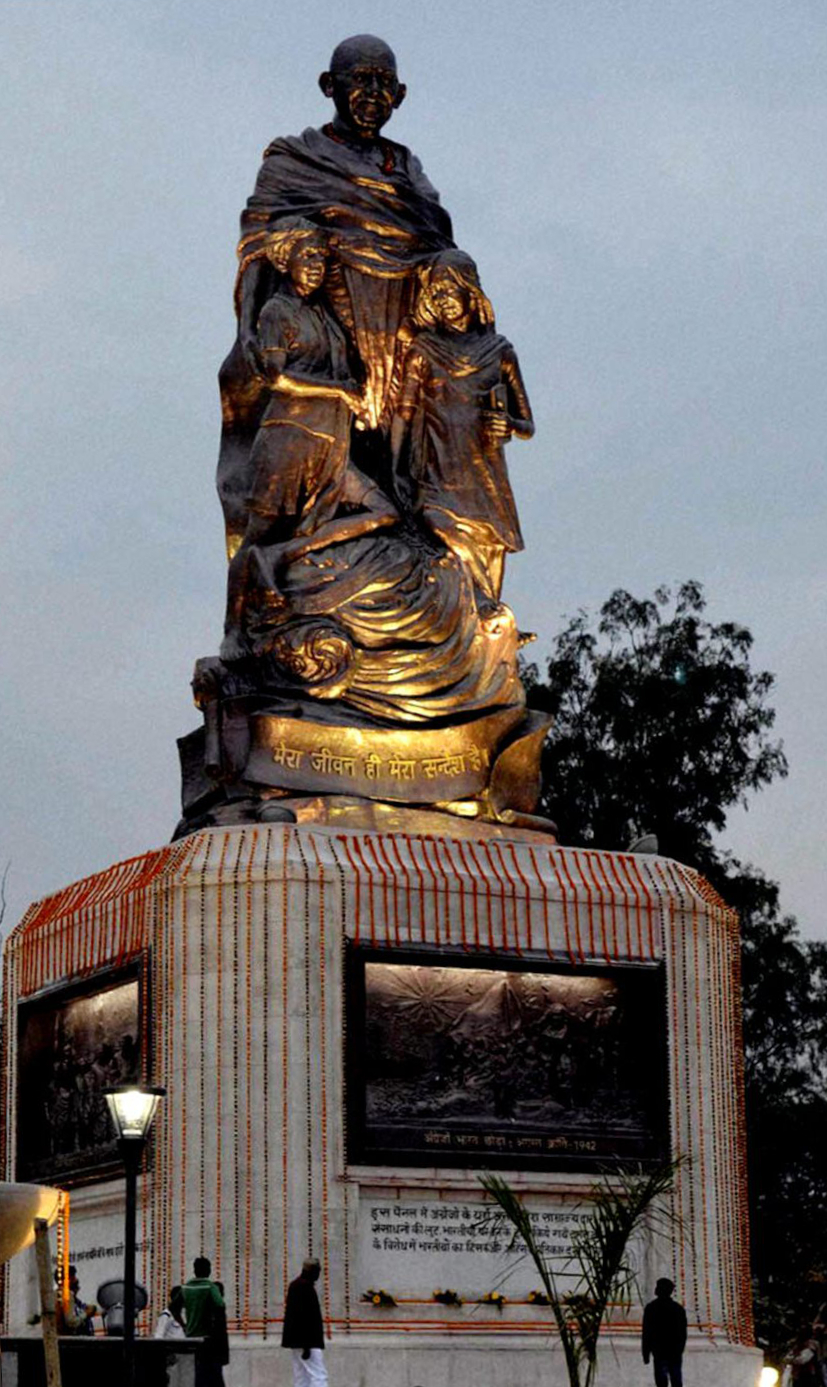
- International Non-Violence Day is observed on the birthday of Mahatma Gandhi
- Observed by: All UN Member States
- Date: 2 October
- Frequency: Annual

International Day of Non-Violence is observed on 2 October, the birthday of Mahatma Gandhi. It was established on 15 June 2007 according to United Nations General Assembly resolution A/RES/61/271. The day is an occasion to "disseminate the message of non-violence ... through education and public awareness ... and reaffirm the desire for a culture of peace, tolerance, understanding and non-violence". It is not a public holiday, but is observed around the world in various ways, often to draw attention to global issues. Its date and purpose correspond with those of the Indian national public holiday of Gandhi Jayanti.

== Background ==
In January 2004, Iranian Nobel laureate Shirin Ebadi had taken a proposal for an International Day of Non-Violence from a Hindi teacher in Paris teaching international students to the World Social Forum in Mumbai. The idea gradually attracted the interest of some leaders of India's Congress Party ("Ahimsa Finds Teen Voice", The Telegraph, Calcutta) until a Satyagraha Conference resolution in New Delhi in January 2007, initiated by Indian National Congress President and Chairperson of the United Progressive Alliance Sonia Gandhi and Archbishop Desmond Tutu, called upon the United Nations to adopt the idea.

On 15 June 2007, the United Nations General Assembly voted to establish 2 October as the International Day of Non-Violence. The resolution by the General Assembly asks all members of the UN system to commemorate 2 October in "an appropriate manner and disseminate the message of non-violence, including through education and public awareness".

External Affairs Minister, Dr S Jaishankar and UNSG António Guterres, unveiled the bust of Mahatma Gandhi in the prestigious North Lawn Gardens of the United Nations headquarters at New York. The Gandhi bust is a gift from India to the UN and is the first Gandhi sculpture installed at its headquarters.

== See also ==
- International Day of Peace
- Gandhi Jayanti
- Mahatma Gandhi
