= James Page (Australian educationist) =

Australian educationist

James Smith Page (born 1953) is an Australian educationist and anthropologist, and a recognised authority within the field of peace education.

== Education ==
Page holds a BA (Honours) degree from Griffith University, a Bachelor of Divinity degree from the University of Queensland, a Graduate Diploma in Education from Charles Sturt University, a Master of Education (Honours) degree from the University of New England, and a PhD degree from Southern Cross University.

== Professional career ==
Page has taught in secondary teaching, peace and conflict studies, and teacher education. He was a member of the International Year for the Culture of Peace Taskforce within the UNESCO Secretariat in Paris, and a member of GIPGAP (Group on International Perspectives on Governmental Aggression and Peace), examining social attitudes to peace and war. Page is currently an adjunct professor with the University of New England, Australia.

== Critical recognition ==
- Recognition by the ACSSA
- Recognition by the International Human Rights Arts Movement
- Joint winner Banjo Paterson Writing Award
- Fellow of the Australian Anthropological Society
- Recipient of the IER Award for Outstanding Educational Research
- Recognition by the Director-General of UNESCO
- Nominee for the UNESCO-Madanjeet Singh Prize
- Recipient of the United Nations Queensland Award
- Joint winner of the WSFBPC Peace Essay Contest

== Select bibliography ==
- Page, J.S. (2020) 'Philosophy of Peace'. Internet Encyclopedia of Philosophy. ISSN 2161-0002.
- Page, J.S. (2014) 'Peace Education'. In: D. Phillips (ed.) Encyclopedia of Educational Theory and Philosophy. (597–599). Thousand Oaks: Sage Publications
- Page, J.S. et alia (2013) 'Definitions of peace and reconciliation in Great Britain, Northern Ireland, Canada, the United States, and Australia', In: K. Malley-Morrison, A. Mercurio, and G. Twose (eds.) International Handbook of Peace and Reconciliation. (35–49). NY: Springer.
- Page, J.S. et alia (2013) 'Perspectives on invasion: Great Britain, Northern Ireland, United States, Canada and Australia'. In: K. Malley-Morrison, S. McCarthy, and K. Hines (eds.) International Handbook on War, Torture and Terrorism. (359–379). NY: Springer.
- Page, J.S. (2010) 'Peace Education'. In: E. Baker, B. McGaw, and P. Peterson (eds.) International Encyclopedia of Education. Volume 1. (850–854). Oxford: Elsevier.
- Page, J.S.(2009) 'Chapter 7: Australia'. In: Kathleen Malley-Morrison (ed.) State Violence and the Right to Peace. Volume 4. (137–155, 280–281). Santa Barbara: Praeger Security International.
- Page, J.S. (2008) Peace Education: Exploring Ethical and Philosophical Foundations. Charlotte: Information Age Publishing.
- Page, J.S. (2008) 'Chapter 9: The United Nations and Peace Education'. In: Monisha Bajaj (ed.) Encyclopedia of Peace Education. (75–83). Charlotte: Information Age Publishing.
- Page, J.S. (2008) 'Philosophy of Peace Education'. In: Monisha Bajaj (ed.) Online Encyclopedia of Peace Education. New York: Columbia University, Teachers College. Available online.
