= Keeling-Puri Peace Plaza =

Coordinates: 42.3157°N 88.98056°W

- Interactive map of Keeling-Puri Peace Plaza
- Nearest city: Rockford, Illinois
- Area: 2.5 acres (1.0 ha)
- Created: 2002

The Keeling-Puri Peace Plaza is a 2.5-acre (10,000 m^{2}) park in Rockford, Illinois, United States. Established in 2002, the plaza celebrates the United Nations’ official September 21 International Day of Peace. The plaza showcases 44 flags, and has messages of peace in more than 60 languages. The heart of the plaza (the Harmony Index) features two connected circles around an outline of the world, representing unity through diversity in action. Co-founded by Rockford philanthropists Jim Keeling and Sunil Puri, it is located on Rockford’s east side, along the Perryville bicycle path. The plaza also features ten statues of well-known peace advocates including Martin Luther King Jr., Mahatma Gandhi, Mother Teresa and John Lennon, with quotations from each pertaining to nonviolence. Nationally-known sculptor Lee Sido designed the Harmony Index. One of the plaza's founders has commented, "The aspiration is for each individual to take personal responsibility for the world. Recognizing that we are all interconnected, we each have our role in improving how we deal with each other and improving how we deal with other countries. Everything in the world starts with the individual".
