= Gallipoli Games =

The inaugural Gallipoli Games was held in 2015 under the patronage of the Presidency of the Republic of Turkey. It was held to celebrate the 100th anniversary of the Gallipoli Campaign and is intended to be held every two years.

== Background ==
The Games have the motto: On the land their ancestors sacrificed their lives 100 years ago, they are now competing for peace. University students from seven countries - Turkey, Australia, New Zealand, India, Germany, France and the Great Britain are eligible to compete. The torch relay commenced in March 2015 and it visited the seven participating countries.

The University Sports Federation of Turkey managed the Games, and the Turkish Government provided funding of TRY 50 million.

The first Games were due to be held 25–29 April 2015. However, in mid-April 2015, the organisers decided to postpone the Games to tie in with the International Day of Peace on September 21. Games co-chairman Omer Mutlugun said "the postponement would allow the event to receive due international recognition and better mirror the games’ motto about competing for peace."

== Summary ==
| No | Dates | Location | Sports | No of Athletes |
|---|---|---|---|---|
| 1st | September 2015 | Çanakkale, Turkey | 3x3 basketball, tennis, cycling, triathlon, sailing, beach volleyball, open water swimming, rugby 7s | 490 |
