= Euro gold and silver commemorative coins (Vatican) =

State of the Vatican City Stato della Città del Vaticano (in Italian)
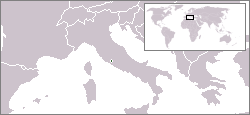
- ISO 3166 code: VA

The Vatican City, even though not a member of the European Union, is a member of the Eurozone. Since 2002, it has had a special agreement with the EU that allows this microstate to mint a limited number of euro coins. These are limited specifically to commemorative coins made of silver and other precious and semi-precious metals minted by the Vatican City, and do not include pre-2002 commemorative coins.

== 2002 Coinage ==
Europe, a Project of Peace and Unity			
Designer: Paolo Borghi		Mint: -	
Value: €5	Alloy: Ag. 925/1000	Quantity: 10,000	Quality: Proof
Issued: 10.09.2002	Diameter: 32 mm	Weight: 18 g	Issue Price: €37
The inscription +++TOTUS TUUS+++MMII is written around the circumference of this coin.
No Peace without Justice, No Justice without Forgiveness			
Designer: Floriano Bodini		Mint: -	
Value: €10	Alloy: Ag. 925/1000	Quantity: 10,000	Quality: Proof
Issued: 16.12.2002	Diameter: 34 mm	Weight: 22 g	Issue Price: €45
"No Peace without Justice, No Justice without Forgiveness" this was the message of the late John Paul II in a speech given on 1 January 2002, World Peace Day.
Noel's Arch			
Designer: Floriano Bodini		Mint: -	
Value: €20	Alloy: Au 917/1000	Quantity: 2,800	Quality: Proof
Issued: 16.12.2002	Diameter: 21 mm	Weight: 6 g	Issue Price: €152
This coin makes part of a 3 years programme entitled "The Roots of Faith", thus, more coins under the same programme were released in 2003 and 2004.
Abraham's Sacrifice			
Designer: Floriano Bodini		Mint: -	
Value: €50	Alloy: Au 917/1000	Quantity: 2,800	Quality: Proof
Issued: 16.12.2002	Diameter: 28 mm	Weight: 15 g	Issue Price: €380
This coin makes part of a 3 years programme entitled "The Roots of Faith", thus, more coins under the same programme were released in 2003 and 2004.

== 2003 Coinage ==
Rosary's Year			
Designer: Roberto Mauri		Mint: -	
Value: €5	Alloy: Ag 925/1000	Quantity: 10,000	Quality: unknown
Issued: 14.10.2003	Diameter: 32 mm	Weight: 18 g	Issue Price: €40
25th Anniv of the Pontification of John Paul II			
Designer: Amalia Mistichelli		Mint: -	
Value: €10	Alloy: Ag 925/1000	Quantity: 10,000	Quality: unknown
Issued: 14.10.2003	Diameter: 34 mm	Weight: 22 g	Issue Price: €40
Moses Saved from the River			
Designer: Floriano Bodini		Mint: -	
Value: €20	Alloy: Au 917/1000	Quantity: 2,800	Quality: unknown
Issued: 14.10.2003	Diameter: 21 mm	Weight: 6 g	Issue Price: €152
This coin makes part of a 3 years programme entitled "The Roots of Faith". The first series of coins was issued in 2002.
Ten Commandments			
Designer: Floriano Bodini		Mint: -	
Value: €50	Alloy: Au 917/1000	Quantity: 2,800	Quality: unknown
Issued: 14.10.2003	Diameter: 28 mm	Weight: 15 g	Issue Price: €380
This coin makes part of a 3 years programme entitled "The Roots of Faith". The first series of coins was issued in 2002.

== 2004 Coinage ==
150th Anniv. of the Proclamation of the "Dogma of the Immaculate Conception"			
Designer: Amalia Mistichelli		Mint: -	
Value: €5	Alloy: Ag. 925/1000	Quantity: 13,000	Quality: unknown
Issued: 28.10.2004	Diameter: 32 mm	Weight: 18 g	Issue Price: €43
"World Day of Peace 2004" International Right, a Way for the Peace			
Designer: Amalia Mistichelli		Mint: -	
Value: €10	Alloy: Ag. 925/1000	Quantity: 13,000	Quality: unknown
Issued: 28.10.2004	Diameter: 34 mm	Weight: 22 g	Issue Price: €51
David and Goliath			
Designer: Floriano Bodini		Mint: -	
Value: €20	Alloy: Gold 917/1000	Quantity: 3,050	Quality: Proof
Issued: 28.10.2004	Diameter: 21 mm	Weight: 6 g	Issue Price: €152
This coin together with another one end the series of 6 coins entitled "The Roots of Faith" which were released over the span of 3 years, two per year.
The Judgment of Solomon			
Designer: Floriano Bodini		Mint: -	
Value: €50	Alloy: Gold 917/1000	Quantity: 3,050	Quality: Proof
Issued: 28.10.2004	Diameter: 28 mm	Weight: 15 g	Issue Price: €380
This coin together with another one end the series of 6 coins entitled "The Roots of Faith" which were released over the span of 3 years, two per year.

== 2005 Coinage ==
Vacant Papal See			
Designer: Daniela Longo		Mint: -	
Value: €5	Alloy: Ag. 925/1000	Quantity: 13,440	Quality: unknown
Issued: 30.06.2005	Diameter: 32 mm	Weight: 18 g	Issue Price: €50
John Paul II died in 2005 thus the papal see post became vacant. During this period the Vatican City issued this commemorative coin.
60th Anniversary of the End of the Second World War			
Designer: Orietta Rossi		Mint: -	
Value: €5	Alloy: Ag. 925/1000	Quantity: 13,000	Quality: Proof
Issued: 06.12.2005	Diameter: 32 mm	Weight: 18 g	Issue Price: €50
This was the first commemorative coin to depict pope Benedict XVI.
The Eucharistic Year			
Designer: Guido Veroi		Mint: -	
Value: €10	Alloy: Ag. 925/1000	Quantity: 13,000	Quality: Proof
Issued: 06.12.2005	Diameter: 34 mm	Weight: 22 g	Issue Price: €60
The Sacraments of Christian Initiation: Baptism			
Designer: Guido Veroi & Daniela Fusco		Mint: -	
Value: €20	Alloy: Au 917/1000	Quantity: 3,046	Quality: Proof
Issued: 06.12.2005	Diameter: 21 mm	Weight: 6 g	Issue Price: €160
Three out of the seven sacraments are considered as vital for the Christian faith initiation, these are baptism, confirmation and the Eucharist. The Vatican dedicated a 3 years programme (2005-2007) for these 3 sacraments, a year for each. The 2005 coins were dedicated to baptism.
The Sacraments of Christian Initiation: Baptism			
Designer: Guido Veroi & Daniela Fusco		Mint: -	
Value: €50	Alloy: Au 917/1000	Quantity: 3,044	Quality: Proof
Issued: 06.12.2005	Diameter: 28 mm	Weight: 15 g	Issue Price: €400
Three out of the seven sacraments are considered as vital for the Christian faith initiation, these are baptism, confirmation and the Eucharist. The Vatican dedicated a 3 years programme (2005-2007) for these 3 sacraments, a year for each. The 2005 coins were dedicated to baptism.

== 2006 Coinage ==
Gian Lorenzo Bernini			
Designer: Gabriella Titotto		Mint: -	
Value: €10	Alloy: Silver 925/1000	Quantity: 14,160	Quality: Proof
Issued: 09.11.2006	Diameter: 34 mm	Weight: 22 g	Issue Price: €60
World Day of Peace: 'In Truth, Peace'			
Designer: Damela Longo		Mint: -	
Value: €5	Alloy: Silver 925/1000	Quantity: 14,160	Quality: Proof
Issued: 09.11.2006	Diameter: 32 mm	Weight: 18 g	Issue Price: €50
The Sacraments of Christian Initiation: Confirmation			
Designer: Guido Veroi		Mint: -	
Value: €20	Alloy: Au 917/1000	Quantity: 3,326	Quality: Proof
Issued: 09.11.2006	Diameter: 21 mm	Weight: 6 g	Issue Price: €160
Three out of the seven sacraments are considered as vital for the Christian faith initiation, these are baptism, confirmation and the Eucharist. The Vatican dedicated a 3 years programme (2005-2007) for these 3 sacraments, a year for each. The 2006 coins were dedicated to confirmation.
The Sacraments of Christian Initiation: Confirmation			
Designer: Guido Veroi		Mint: -	
Value: €50	Alloy: Au 917/1000	Quantity: 3,324	Quality: Proof
Issued: 09.11.2006	Diameter: 28 mm	Weight: 15 g	Issue Price: €400
Three out of the seven sacraments are considered as vital for the Christian faith initiation, these are baptism, confirmation and the Eucharist. The Vatican dedicated a 3 years programme (2005-2007) for these 3 sacraments, a year for each. The 2006 coins were dedicated to confirmation.

== 2007 Coinage ==
81st World Mission Day: All the Churches for all the World			
Designer: Orietta Rossi		Mint: -	
Value: €5	Alloy: Ag 925/1000	Quantity: 13,694	Quality: Proof
Issued: 23.10.2007	Diameter: 32 mm	Weight: 18 g	Issue Price: €50
World Day of Peace: The human person, the heart of peace			
Designer: De Seta - Masini		Mint: -	
Value: €10	Alloy: Ag 925/1000	Quantity: 13,693	Quality: Proof
Issued: 23.10.2007	Diameter: 34 mm	Weight: 22 g	Issue Price: €60
The Sacraments of Christian Initiation: Eucharist			
Designer: Guido Veroi		Mint: -	
Value: €20	Alloy: Au 917/1000	Quantity: 3,426	Quality: Proof
Issued: 23.10.2007	Diameter: 21 mm	Weight: 6 g	Issue Price: €160
Three out of the seven sacraments are considered as vital for the Christian faith initiation, these are baptism, confirmation and the Eucharist. The Vatican dedicated a 3 years programme (2005-2007) for these 3 sacraments, a year for each. The 2007 coins were dedicated to the Eucharist.
The Sacraments of Christian Initiation: Eucharist			
Designer: Guido Veroi		Mint: -	
Value: €50	Alloy: Au 917/1000	Quantity: 3,424	Quality: Proof
Issued: 23.10.2007	Diameter: 28 mm	Weight: 5 g	Issue Price: €400
Three out of the seven sacraments are considered as vital for the Christian faith initiation, these are baptism, confirmation and the Eucharist. The Vatican dedicated a 3 years programme (2005-2007) for these 3 sacraments, a year for each. The 2007 coins were dedicated to the Eucharist.

== 2008 Coinage ==
The Sistine Chapel - The Creation of Man			
Designer: Uliana Pernazza		Mint: -	
Value: €100	Alloy: Au. 917/1000	Quantity: 960	Quality: Proof
Issued: 24.06.2008	Diameter: 35 mm	Weight: 30 g	Issue Price: €980
