= International Day of Peace, Jigjiga (2025) =

Global Peace Day celebration in Jigjiga

- Date: 21 September, 2025
- Location: Jigjiga, Somali Region of Ethiopia
- Theme: Youth in Action for Sustainable Peace
- Organized by: United Nations, Government of Ethiopia, Civil Society organisations

The International Day of Peace in Jigjiga (2025) is a regional observance held on 21 September 2025 in Jigjiga, the capital of Ethiopia’s Somali Region, as part of global commemorations of the International Day of Peace.

The event brought together youth representatives, government officials, civil society organisations, and United Nations agencies to promote peacebuilding, dialogue, and social cohesion.

== Background ==
The International Day of Peace was established by the United Nations in 1981 and is observed annually on 21 September to promote global peace and non-violence.

The 2025 observance was marked globally under the theme “Act Now for a Peaceful World,” emphasizing urgent collective action to address conflict and promote sustainable peace.

In Ethiopia, the commemoration also highlighted the role of youth in peacebuilding under the national theme “Youth in Action for Sustainable Peace.”

== Event ==
The 2025 observance in Jigjiga was organized with participation from the United Nations, Ethiopian government representatives, and civil society actors. The gathering emphasized the role of young people in promoting peace and stability in the country.

Participants included youth leaders from across Ethiopia, as well as individuals affected by past conflicts, who shared experiences and promoted dialogue and reconciliation.

Speakers at the event highlighted the importance of sustained commitment to peacebuilding, emphasizing that peace requires continuous action, cooperation, and community engagement.

== Themes and activities ==
The event focused on youth engagement in peacebuilding, including:

- Dialogue sessions on conflict resolution
- Community engagement initiatives
- Advocacy for social cohesion and inclusion

These activities aligned with broader international efforts to involve young people in peace processes and development initiatives.

== Significance ==
The Jigjiga observance formed part of wider national and international efforts to promote peace in Ethiopia, a country that has experienced periods of political tension and conflict.

By focusing on youth participation, the event reflected a broader policy emphasis on empowering young people as key actors in conflict prevention and sustainable peacebuilding.

== See also ==
- International Day of Peace
- Jigjiga
