= Seville Statement on Violence =

1986 UNESCO scientists' averment

The Seville Statement on Violence is a statement on violence that was adopted by an international meeting of scientists, convened by the Spanish National Commission for UNESCO, in Seville, Spain, on 16 May 1986. It was subsequently adopted by UNESCO at the twenty-fifth session of the General Conference on 16 November 1989. The statement, then known as a 'Statement on Violence', was designed to refute "the notion that organized human violence is biologically determined".

== Core ideas ==
The statement contains five core ideas. These ideas are:

1. "It is scientifically incorrect to say that we have inherited a tendency to make war from our animal ancestors."
2. "It is scientifically incorrect to say that war or any other violent behaviour is genetically programmed into our human nature."
3. "It is scientifically incorrect to say that in the course of human evolution there has been a selection for aggressive behaviour more than for other kinds of behaviour."
4. "It is scientifically incorrect to say that humans have a 'violent brain'."
5. "It is scientifically incorrect to say that war is caused by 'instinct' or any single motivation."

The statement concludes: "Just as 'wars begin in the minds of men', peace also begins in our minds. The same species who invented war is capable of inventing peace. The responsibility lies with each of us."

== Founding scientists ==
The following is a list of the scientists who contributed to the statement:

- (United States) David Adams, Psychology, Wesleyan University, Middletown, Connecticut, U.S.
- S.A. Barnett, Ethology, The Australian National University, Canberra, Australia
- (Soviet Union) N.P. Bechtereva, Neurophysiology, Institute for Experimental Medicine of the Academy of Medical Sciences of the U.S.S.R., Leningrad, U.S.S.R.
- (United States) Bonnie Frank Carter, Psychology, Albert Einstein Medical Center, Philadelphia, U.S.
- José M. Rodriguez Delgado, Neurophysiology, Centro de Estudios Neurobiológicos, Madrid, Spain
- José Luis Díaz, Ethology, Instituto Mexicano de Psiquiatría, México D.F., Mexico
- Andrzej Eliasz, Individual Differences Psychology, Polish Academy of Sciences, Warsaw, Poland
- Santiago Genovés, Biological Anthropology, Instituto de Estudios Antropológicos, México D.F., Mexico
- (United States) Benson E. Ginsburg, Behavior Genetics, University of Connecticut, Storrs, Connecticut, U.S.
- Jo Groebel, Social Psychology, Erziehungswissenschaftliche Hochschule, Landau, Federal Republic of Germany
- Samir-Kumar Ghosh, Sociology, Indian Institute of Human Sciences, Calcutta, India
- (United Kingdom) Robert Hinde, Animal Behaviour, Cambridge University, Cambridge, UK
- Richard E. Leakey, Physical Anthropology, National Museums of Kenya, Nairobi, Kenya
- Taha H. Malasi, Psychiatry, Kuwait University, Kuwait
- J. Martín Ramírez, Psychobiology, Universidad de Sevilla, Spain
- Federico Mayor Zaragoza, Biochemistry, Universidad Autónoma, Madrid, Spain
- Diana L. Mendoza, Ethology, Universidad de Sevilla, Spain
- Ashis Nandy, Political Psychology, Centre for the Study of Developing Societies, Delhi, India
- (United States) John Paul Scott, Animal Behaviour, Bowling Green State University, Bowling Green, Ohio, U.S.
- Riitta Wahlstrom, Psychology, University of Jyväskylä, Finland

== Dissemination and endorsements ==
Once it was drafted and signed by the founding group in May, 1986, the Statement on Violence was disseminated around the world, as described in the newsletter that was issued three or four times a year from 1986 through 1994 as well as two occasions later in 2002 and 2003.

The Statement has been published in over 150 scientific and popular journals, including versions translated into more than 20 languages.

UNESCO decided to disseminate the Statement widely in a decision of the twenty-fifth session of the General Conference on 16 November 1989. In 1991, this led to publication and dissemination of a UNESCO brochure in English as well as in Spanish, French and Arabic. The brochure, with the subtitle "Preparing the Ground for the Constructing of Peace" helped prepare the ground for the UNESCO Culture of Peace Programme.

By the time UNESCO published its brochure, the Statement had been endorsed or disseminated by 75 organizations, including formal endorsements by three of the major social science organizations of the United States, the American Anthropological Association, the American Psychological Association and the American Sociological Association.

== Practical implications ==
Belief concerning the relationship between warfare and biology may have practical implications. It has been shown that if one believes that war is biologically determined, he or she is less likely to engage in activities to promote peace. Conversely, if one believes that war is not biologically determined, one is more likely to work for peace.

According to an international survey of students in 1972, about half the respondents "favoured a hereditary theory of war and aggression". This result was replicated by studies in Finland and the United States. John Horgan reported in 2009 that 185 out of 205 surveyed students at Purdue University believed that humans would never stop fighting wars.

== Criticism ==
Cognitive psychologist Steven Pinker has criticized the Seville Statement as being an example of the moralistic fallacy. Pinker has used the Seville Statement as an example of the idea of biological determinism, the incorrect idea that genes are solely responsible for any of our behaviors.

Joseph Manson and Richard Wrangham wrote, "We agree with the Statement on Violence that there is no justification for using biological findings in the service of violence and war. We disagree, however, with the idea that the biological basis of war is irrelevant to thinking about peace. We believe (a) that the tendency to behave aggressively in particular circumstances has been favored by natural selection in humans and other animals; (b) that natural selection has favored particularly extreme forms of aggression in humans and very few other species; and (c) that it is easier to foster peace by understanding rather than ignoring the biological conditions that have favored violence and war. Thus, we believe that war does have a biological basis, and not just in the trivial sense that humans have the biological capacity to make war." Robert Hinde, one of the signatories, responded the statement "argues that the genes, neural apparatus etc. which make war possible do not make it inevitable... the Statement is in no way to be construed as attacking the basis of the interesting research conducted by Manson and Wrangham and their colleagues."

Robin Fox expressed dismay the statement was endorsed by the American Anthropological Association, describing it as a "pointless document" and "shopworn denunciations of ideas that no one really held in the first place."

In "Aggression and Peacefulness in Humans and Other Primates", editors James Silverberg and J. Patrick Gray write,

"a narrow focus on what is scientifically incorrect formulates the issues incompletely and makes the SSV appear to be naive... Missing from the Statement is a sense of what science does know about aggression and violence in humans and other animals. Without this information we believe the SSV fails in its laudable purpose of alleviating pessimism about our ability to control violence. Simply to inform the public that "it's not biological"—that human nature or animal nature cannot be "blamed" for war and violence—provides no guidance on how to explain and thus possibly to control these phenomena. In other words, the SSV fails to provide grounds for the optimism that its signatories see as vital in efforts to promote peace. If the SSV does generate an optimistic outlook on the possibility of controlling war and violence, we fear it will be an unreasoning and thus a vulnerable optimism. Our view derives from the fact that recent research on the multiplicity of biological, sociological and cultural factors relevant to violence among primates indicates that some level of violence, or the threat of violence, plays a vital role in the social life of some primate species. An important implication of this research is that, in commenting on the nature of violence, we must abandon the often unexamined equation of violence with social pathology. We must be willing to accept the possibility that in certain circumstances threatened and even actual violence might have pro-social outcomes... An understanding of this dynamic is vital to the control of violence in human societies."

Primatologist Frans de Waal wrote,

"While welcoming the spirit of the Statement (SSV), I... question the wisdom of its signatories in downplaying the importance of biology (read: genetics) relative to other influences on human behavior. Admittedly, biologists have promoted a rather narrow view of human and animal nature, with great emphasis on competition... A more balanced and moderate view can be achieved, however, without abandoning previous valuable insights... In providing this correction, however, the SSV makes essentially the same mistake: it emphasizes one influence at the expense of the other. Not satisfied with the full recognition of environmental factors, the SSV tends to dismiss human nature altogether... By presenting the majority view outside biology as the academic consensus, the SSV is driving a wedge between ethology and the other behavioral sciences. This is an unfortunate development that needs to be countered both by pointing out the weaknesses and internal contradictions of the document itself, and by a search for common ground."

De Waal summarises his argument thus: "The Seville Statement on Violence, which attacks the belief that human nature stands in the way of world peace, is criticized for its ideological nature. The Statement is shown to caricature the biological approach to aggressive behavior by suggesting that this approach excludes environmental and cultural influences... Primates possess powerful mechanisms of reassurance and reconciliation that allow them to cope with most of the socially negative effects of intragroup aggression. As a result, aggression can be a well-integrated part of and can contribute constructively to social relationships."

In a 2009 book, David Adams – one of the Seville signatories – replied to criticisms by contending that the origins of human war are better explained by culture than by biology. According to Adams,

By the end of prehistory, the culture of war was probably pervasive, judging by archaeological evidence. The best hypothesis is that ritual warfare was maintained by most societies and, in the long run, this prepared them to survive otherwise catastrophic famines by raiding the supplies of other communities, or defending their own supplies at such a time. The culture of war included both psychological preparation for war through myths, rituals and traditions and physical preparation through the regular practice of combat, ranging from sporting competitions and initiation rites to ritual warfare and periodic raids and feuds.

— David Adams, The History of the Culture of War (2009), p.176

Scientific papers in both evolutionary psychology and neuropsychology suggest that human violence does indeed have biological roots. A 2008 article in Nature by Dan Jones stated that "The decades since have not been kind to these cherished beliefs. A growing number of psychologists, neuroscientists and anthropologists have accumulated evidence that understanding many aspects of antisocial behaviour, including violence and murder, requires the study of brains, genes and evolution, as well as the societies those factors have wrought." Evolutionary psychologists generally argue that violence is not done for its own sake but is a by-product of goals such as higher status or reproductive success. Some evolutionary psychologists argue that humans have specific mechanisms for specific forms of violence such as against stepchildren (the Cinderella effect). Chimpanzees have violence between groups, which has similarities to raids and violence between groups in non-state societies. Several studies have found that the death rates from inter-group violence are similar for non-state societies and chimpanzees. On the other hand, intra-group violence is lower in humans living in small group societies than in chimpanzees. Humans may have a strong tendency to differ between ingroup and outgroup, which affects altruistic and aggressive behavior. There is also evidence that both intra-group and inter-group violence were much more prevalent in the recent past and in tribal societies, which suggests that tendencies to use violence in order to achieve goals are affected by society. Reduced inequalities, more available resources, and reduced blood feuds due to better functioning justice systems may have contributed to declining intra-group violence.

== See also ==
- UNESCO statements on race
