= Decade to Overcome Violence =

International initiative

The Decade to Overcome Violence: Churches Seeking Reconciliation and Peace 2001 – 2010 (DOV) is an initiative of the World Council of Churches. It was decided by the 8th General Assembly in Harare, Zimbabwe in 1998 and runs parallel to the United Nations' Decade for the Promotion of a Culture of Peace and Non-Violence for the Children of the World. The DOV works with the data provided by the World Health Organization in its 2002 World Report on Health and Violence.
