= Felipe Mac Gregor =

Felipe Estanislao Mac Gregor Rolino (*Callao, Peru, September 20, 1914 – October 2, 2004) was a Jesuit and Professor in Peru. He introduced the concept of the Culture of Peace to UNESCO, which became a major program of the organization.

== Biography ==
Felipe Mac Gregor was born in Callao on September 20, 1914. He entered the Society of Jesus on 1931 in Cordoba, Argentina. He was ordained as a priest on December 23, 1944. Former Rector of Pontificia Universidad Católica del Perú.

== Works ==
- Graficos de historia de la filosofía, coautor con Ismael Quiles, Espasa-Calpe, Bs.AS, 1952.
- Decreto ley N°17437 sobre régimen de la Universidad Peruana, UNMSM, Lima, 1969.
- La investigación de la paz, En Socialismo y participaciónN°22 (Junio 1983).
- Siete ensayos sobre la violencia en el Perú, Fundación Friedrich Ebert, 1985 (74 pgs.).
- Cultura de Paz, Lima, 1986.
- La raiz del problema, Apep, Lima, 1993. (52 pgs.)
- Perú, Siglo XXI, PUCP, Lima, 1996 (117 pgs.).
- Sociedad, ley y universidad peruana, PUCP, Lima, 1998 (220 pgs.).
- Reflexión sobre el Perú, PUCP, Lima, 2002 (172 pgs.).
- America Latina y la Doctrina de la Iglesia, diálogo latinoamericano, 2004.

== See also ==
- Pontificia Universidad Católica del Perú PUCP
