= International Decade for a Culture of Peace and Non-Violence for the Children of the World =

United Nations observance

The United Nations General Assembly proclaimed the first decade of the 21st century and the third millennium, the years 2001 to 2010, as the International Decade for a Culture of Peace and Non-Violence for the Children of the World. This followed resolutions about the International Year for the Culture of Peace and the International Day of Peace.

The action plan for the Decade proposes eight spheres of activities in which to work for the promotion of the Culture of Peace:

- To reinforce a culture of peace through education
- To promote economically and socially sustainable development
- To promote the respect of all human rights
- To ensure the equality between women and men
- To support democratic participation
- To develop comprehension, tolerance and solidarity
- To support participate communication and the freedom of movement and of information and knowledge
- To promote international peace and safety

On 29 November 2000, the General Assembly decided to entrust UNESCO with the coordination "of the activities of the organizations of the United Nations system to promote a culture of peace, as well as liaison with other organizations concerned in this matter.". In 2009, the United Nations General Assembly, in a resolution on the International Decade for the Promotion of a Culture of Peace and Non-violence for the Children of the World, endorsed the ongoing work of the Culture of Peace News Network as an important part of the ongoing commitment of the UN to a culture of peace.

== NGOs ==
NGOs and other civil society organizations were urged to contribute to a global movement for a culture of peace according to the Declaration and Programme of Action for a Culture of Peace, adopted by the UN General Assembly in 1999. In response, a mid-term report, submitted to the United Nations in 2005, included information from 700 organizations. In 2010 at the conclusion of the Decade, the Report from the Civil Society was submitted to the United Nations with detailed information and photographs about the actions of 1,054 organizations from over 100 countries. This information is the tip of an even larger iceberg, as indicated by the many partnerships listed by participating organizations which number in the many thousands.

Some national NGOs coalitions promoting the Decade were established in several countries, including Austria, France, Italy and the Netherlands. These national coalitions along with international organizations decided to found the International Coalition for the Decade in June 2003.

Related to this UN Decade, in December 1998, the World Council of Churches adopted, at its 8th Assembly, in Harare (Zimbabwe), the Decade to Overcome Violence as one of its programmes for the decade 2000–2009.

Sue Gilmurray from the Anglican Pacifist Fellowship composed and recorded a cycle of songs to commemorate the decade. The songs tackle a variety of subjects, and they include a critique of the use of child soldiers and an attack on the promotion and marketing of violent films and games towards children.

== See also ==
- Culture of Peace
- International Salon for Peace Initiatives
- The Ribbon International
