= Peace Parade UK =

Annual parade in northern England (2006–2009)

Peace Parade UK was an annual parade held in the northern England town of Rochdale from 2006 to 2009, to mark the United Nations International Day of Peace. It was attended by over 2,000 people each year and was supported by the government, celebrities and campaigners from across the UK.

== Origin ==
The project was founded by John Farrington (founder and project co-organiser), who had previously undertaken peace work in Kosovo in 2003 and made a documentary the BBC’s Inside Out television programme about the effects of the 2004 tsunami in Thailand.

The Rochdale Parade for Peace project began in February 2006 after a meeting with filmmakers Mark Baron and Tariq Quamar of Sleepwalker Films. It was decided that Sleepwalker Films would film the process of these attempts to establish the first ever official and public observation of the U.N. Peace Day in the UK.

== The Peace Parade ==
Each year the parade was led by a celebrity vehicle, including Chitty Chitty Bang Bang in 2007 and the DeLorean car from Back to the Future in 2008.

In February 2007, Rochdale Parade for Peace was renamed Peace Parade UK to reflect the growing results of their efforts. In the summer of 2007, Sleepwalker Films was joined by editor Chris Matthews to complete 'The UN Chitty and Me' for the films' premiere screening.

In January 2008 Peace Parade UK was constituted as a voluntary organisation. Farrington continued as co-organiser.

== Supporters ==
Eighteen MPs including subsequent Labour leader Jeremy Corbyn signed an Early Day Motion in October 2007 expressing support for the Parade. The Parade was attended twice by Nancy Dell'Olio, chair of the peace organisation Truce International and the then girlfriend of former England coach Sven-Göran Eriksson. In 2009 attenders included Mike Newman, holder of the blind land speed world record, and the then Minister for Sport Gerry Sutcliffe. Former prime minister Gordon Brown sent a message of support, pointing out that it was the UK's only public recognition of the International Day of Peace that year.

== Demise ==
In August 2010, Farrington announced that he had decided not to hold further Peace Parades in Rochdale, owing to lack of financial support from Rochdale Council.
