= World Hello Day =

Secular holiday on November 21

- Observed by: 180 countries
- Date: November 21
- Frequency: Annual
- Related to: International Day of Peace

World Hello Day is a secular holiday observed annually on November 21, to express that conflicts should be resolved through communication rather than the use of force. Participants verbally greet ten people or more on that day as an expression of the importance of personal communication in preserving peace. The annual global event began to be celebrated in 1973 as a response to the Yom Kippur War.

== Background ==
Every year, November 21 is World Hello Day. The objective is to greet to at least ten people on the day. The message is for world leaders to use communication rather than force to settle conflicts.

World Hello Day was founded in 1973 by Brian McCormack, a Ph.D. graduate of Arizona State University, and Michael McCormack, a graduate of Harvard University, in response to the Yom Kippur War. The McCormack brothers mailed 1,360 letters in seven languages to government leaders worldwide to encourage participation in the first World Hello Day. Since that time, World Hello Day has been observed by people in 180 countries.

Any person can participate in World Hello Day simply by greeting ten people or more. This demonstrates the importance of personal communication for preserving peace. World Hello Day was begun in response to the conflict between Egypt and Israel in the fall of 1973. People around the world use the occasion of World Hello Day as an opportunity to express their concern for world peace. Beginning with a simple greeting on World Hello Day, their activities send a message to leaders, encouraging them to use communication rather than force to settle conflicts. In its first year, World Hello Day gained the support of 15 countries.

Winners of the Nobel Peace Prize are among the people who have noted World Hello Day's value as an instrument for preserving peace and as an occasion that makes it possible for anyone in the world to contribute to the process of creating peace. Other supporters include almost 100 authors, entertainers, and world leaders.
