= Peace education =

Interdisciplinary approach to pedagogy of violent conflict and social injustice

Peace education is the process of acquiring values, knowledge, attitudes, skills, and behaviors to live in harmony with oneself, others, and the natural environment.

There are numerous United Nations declarations and resolutions on the importance of peace. Ban Ki-moon, U.N. Secretary-General, dedicated the International Day of Peace 2013 to peace education in an effort to focus minds and financing on the preeminence of peace education as the means to bring about a culture of peace. Koichiro Matsuura, the immediate past Director-General of UNESCO, has written that peace education is of "fundamental importance to the mission of UNESCO and the United Nations". Peace education as a right is increasingly emphasized by peace researchers such as Betty Reardon and Douglas Roche. There has also been a recent meshing of peace education and human rights education.

== Definition ==
Ian Harris and John Synott have described peace education as a series of "teaching encounters" that draw from people:

- Their desire for peace.
- Nonviolent alternatives for managing conflict.
- Skills for critical analysis of structural arrangements that produce and legitimize injustice and inequality.

James Page suggests peace education be thought of as "encouraging a commitment to peace as a settled disposition and enhancing the confidence of the individual as an individual agent of peace; as informing the student on the consequence of war and social injustice; as informing the student on the value of peaceful and just social structures and working to uphold or develop such social structures; as encouraging the student to love the world and to imagine a peaceful future; and as caring for the student and encouraging the student to care for others".

Often the theory or philosophy of peace education has been assumed, but not articulated. Johan Galtung suggested in 1975 that no theory for peace education existed and there was clearly an urgent need for such theory. More recently there have been attempts to establish such a theory. Joachim James Calleja has suggested that a philosophical basis for peace education might be located in the Kantian notion of duty. James Page has suggested that a rationale for peace education might be found in virtue ethics, consequentialist ethics, conservative political ethics, aesthetic ethics, and care ethics. Robert L. Holmes claims that a moral presumption against violence exists among civilized nations. On the basis of this presumptive prohibition, he outlines several philosophical values, including pacifism, relevant to the nonviolent resolution of international conflicts.

Since the early 20th century, "peace education" programs around the world have represented a spectrum of focal themes, including anti-nuclearism, international understanding, environmental responsibility, communication skills, nonviolence, conflict resolution techniques, democracy, human rights awareness, tolerance of diversity, coexistence, and gender equality.

== Forms ==
=== Conflict resolution training ===
"Peace education programs centered on conflict resolution typically focus on the social-behavioural symptoms of conflict; they train individuals to resolve inter-personal disputes through negotiation and (peer) mediation. The main elements of these programs include: learning to manage anger, "fighting fair"; improving communication through skills such as listening, turn-taking, identifying needs, and separating facts from emotions. Participants are encouraged to take responsibility for their actions and to brainstorm together on compromises" (Clarke-Habibi, 2005).

"In general, approaches of this type aim to "alter beliefs, attitudes, and behaviours ... from negative to positive attitudes toward conflict as a basis for preventing violence" (Van Slyck, Stern and Elbedour, 1999). Various styles or approaches in conflict resolution training (ADR, Verbal Aikido, NVC) can give the practitioner the means to accept the conflictual situation and orient it towards a peaceful resolution. As one peer mediation coordinator put it: "Conflict is very natural and normal, but you can't go through your entire life beating everybody up—you have to learn different ways to resolve conflict"" (Clarke-Habibi, 2005).

=== Democracy education ===
"Peace education programs centered on democracy education typically focus on the political processes associated with conflict. They postulate that with an increase in democratic participation, societies are less likely to resolve conflict through violence and war. At the same time, "A democratic society needs the commitment of citizens who accept the inevitability of conflict as well as the necessity for tolerance" (U.S. Department of State, The Culture of Democracy, emphasis added). Programs of this kind foster a conflict-positive orientation in the community by training students to view conflict as a platform for creativity and growth" (Clarke-Habibi, 2005).

"Approaches of this type train participants in critical thinking, debate, and coalition-building; they promote the values of freedom of speech, individuality, tolerance of diversity, compromise and conscientious objection. They seek to produce "responsible citizens" who will hold their governments accountable to the standards of peace, primarily through adversarial processes. Activities are structured to have students "assume the role of the citizen that chooses, makes decisions, takes positions, argues positions, and respects the opinions of others". These skills, which sustain multi-party democracy, are assumed to decrease the likelihood of violence and war. It is further assumed that they are necessary to create a culture of peace" (Clarke-Habibi, 2005).

=== Justice education ===
Education for justice is the process of promoting the rule of law (RoL) through educational activities at all levels. Education for justice teaches the next generation about crime prevention, to better understand and address problems that can undermine the rule of law. This approach promotes peace and encourages students to engage actively in their communities and future professions.

Making the RoL and a culture of lawfulness a priority is not just about transmitting knowledge, but also about values and behaviours that are modelled and enforced daily through the 'hidden curriculum'. ‘The ‘hidden curriculum’ of the classroom and school transmits norms, values and beliefs to learners in ways other than formal teaching and learning processes. This ensures that learners develop skills to engage in society as ethically responsible citizens.

=== Human rights education ===
"Peace education programs centered on raising awareness of human rights typically focus on policies that humanity ought to adopt to move closer to a peaceful global community. The aim is to engender a commitment among participants to a vision of structural peace in which all individual members of the human race can exercise personal freedoms and enjoy legal protection from violence, oppression and indignity" (Clarke-Habibi, 2005).

"Approaches of this type familiarize participants with the international covenants and declarations of the United Nations system; train students to recognize violations of the Universal Declaration of Human Rights; and promote tolerance, solidarity, autonomy and self-affirmation at the individual and collective levels" (Clarke-Habibi, 2005).

"Human rights education "faces continual elaboration, a significant theory-practice gap and frequent challenge as to its validity". In one practitioner's view:

"Human rights education does not work in communities fraught with conflict unless it is part of a comprehensive approach... In fact, such education can be counterproductive and lead to greater conflict if people become aware of rights which are not realized. In this respect, human rights education can increase the potential for conflict"

"To prevent these negative outcomes, many such programs are now being combined with aspects of conflict resolution and democracy education schools of thought, along with training in nonviolent action" (Clarke-Habibi, 2005).

=== Worldview transformation ===
Some approaches to peace education start from psychological insights, which recognize the developmental nature of human psychosocial dispositions (Clarke-Habibi, 2005). Conflict-promoting attitudes and behaviours characterize earlier phases of human development; unity-promoting attitudes and behaviours emerge in later phases of healthy development. H.B. Danesh (2002a, 2002b, 2004, 2005, 2007, 2008a, 2008b) proposes an "Integrative Theory of Peace" in which peace is understood as a psychosocial, political, moral and spiritual reality. Peace education, he says, must focus on the healthy development and maturation of human consciousness through assisting people to examine and transform their worldviews. Worldviews are defined as the subconscious lens (acquired through cultural, family, historical, religious and societal influences) through which people perceive four key issues: 1) the nature of reality, 2) human nature, 3) the purpose of existence, 4) the principles governing appropriate human relationships. Surveying a mass of material, Danesh argues that the majority of people and societies in the world hold conflict-based worldviews, which express themselves in conflicted intrapersonal, interpersonal, intergroup, and international relationships. He subdivides conflict-based worldviews into two main categories, which he correlates to phases of human development: the Survival-Based Worldview and the Identity-Based Worldview. Acquiring a more integrative, Unity-Based Worldview increases human capacity to mitigate conflict, create unity in the context of diversity, and establish sustainable cultures of peace - at home, at school, at work, or in the international community.

=== Critical peace education ===
Modern forms of peace education relate to new scholarly explorations and applications of techniques in peace education internationally, in plural communities, and with individuals. Critical Peace Education (Bajaj 2008, 2015; Bajaj & Hantzopoulos 2016; Trifonas & Wright 2013) is an emancipatory pursuit that seeks to link education to the goals and foci of social justice - disrupting inequality through critical pedagogy (Freire 2003). Critical peace education addresses the critique that peace education is imperial and impository mimicking the 'interventionism' of Western peacebuilding by foregrounding local practices and narratives into peace education (Salomon 2004; MacGinty & Richmond 2007; Golding 2017). The project of critical peace education includes conceiving of education as a space of transformation where students and teachers become change agents that recognise past and present experiences of inequity and bias, and where schools become strategic sites fostering emancipatory change.

== Criticism ==
Toh Swee-Hin (1997) observes that each of the various streams of peace education "inevitably have their own dynamics and 'autonomy' in terms of theory and practice". "Salomon (2002) has described what the challenges, goals, and methods of peace education differ substantially between areas characterized by intractable conflict, interethnic tension, or relative tranquility".

Salomon (2002) raises the problem and its consequences:

"Imagine that medical practitioners would not distinguish between invasive surgery to remove malignant tumors and surgery to correct one's vision. Imagine also that while surgeries are practiced, no research and no evaluation of their differential effectiveness accompany them. The field would be considered neither very serious nor very trustworthy. Luckily enough, such a state of affairs does not describe the field of medicine, but it comes pretty close to describing the field of peace education. First, too many profoundly different kinds of activities taking place in an exceedingly wide array of contexts are all lumped under the same category label of "peace education" as if they belong together. Second, for whatever reason, the field's scholarship in the form of theorizing, research and program evaluation badly lags behind practice… In the absence of clarity of what peace education really is, or how its different varieties relate to each other, it is unclear how experience with one variant of peace education in one region can usefully inform programs in another region."

According to Clarke-Habibi (2005), "A general or integrated theory of peace is needed: one that can holistically account for the intrapersonal, inter-personal, inter-group and international dynamics of peace, as well as its main principles and pre-requisites. An essential component of this integrated theory must also be the recognition that a culture of peace can only result from an authentic process of transformation, both individual and collective."

== See also ==
- Anne Frank Educational Centre
- Children's Peace Pavilion
- CISV International
- Concerned Philosophers for Peace
- Culture of Peace
- Culture of Peace News Network
- El-Hibri Peace Education Prize
- Feminist peace research
- Genocide education
- Global Campaign for Peace Education
- Global citizenship education
- Institute for Economics and Peace Building Blocks of Peace program
- International Year for the Culture of Peace
- List of peace activists
- Peace
- Peace and conflict studies
- Peace psychology
- School Day of Non-violence and Peace
- Teaching for social justice
- UNESCO Prize for Peace Education
- University for Peace
- World peace
