= Betty Reardon =

American teacher and academic (1929–2023)

Betty A. Reardon (June 12, 1929 – November 3, 2023) was an American teacher and the founder and director of the Peace Education Center and Peace Education Graduate Degree Program at Teachers College, Columbia University. She was a leader in peace education and a scholar in human rights education at the primary and secondary levels. Along with Elise Boulding and Cynthia Enloe, she was also considered part of the "pioneering generation of women in peace studies" because of her efforts to highlight the dominance of "white haired wise men" in the field, and her desire to make women’s ideas and issues a central part of the debate on world peace. Her publications comprise over 300 works in a number of subject areas including: peace studies, peace education, human rights, gender, and ecology.

== Career ==
Reardon founded the International Institute on Peace Education (IIPE) which has held conferences in sixteen countries, with educators coming from approximately one hundred countries. The significance of the IIPE was cited by UNESCO in a special honorary mention at the Peace Education Prize ceremony in 2002. Further, she was instrumental in the founding of the Global Campaign for Peace Education. Reardon’s work for key institutions, and her writings, have defined the field of peace education, and resulted in her holding numerous prominent roles such as: the Honorary Co-chair of Peace and Justice Studies Association's Advisory Committee; the Academic Coordinator of the Peace Education Professional Development Certificate Program at Teachers College-Tokyo Campus; the School Program Director at the Institute for World Order; and the President of International Jury for the UNESCO Prize for Peace Education. She also held a Doctorate in Education from Teachers College, Columbia University, an MA in history from New York University, and a BA in history from Wheaton College.

== Ideas, influences, and political stances ==
=== Peace and human rights education ===
In her view, peace education is vitally important. In a chapter of her book, Human Rights Education as Education for Peace, she wrote about the development of peace education, but she also said that "peace education as such is less visible in American secondary and elementary schools than ... other approaches" to peace; and that "only a small fraction of university students ever pursue courses in peace studies." This leads to her discussion of human rights education which, she says, "comprehends some of the same normative goals espoused by peace" but while it is "certainly necessary, it is far from sufficient and fails to exploit the essential contribution that human rights can make to peace education." As a result, she argued that "the conceptual core of peace education is violence, it's control, reduction, and elimination", while the "conceptual core of human rights education is human dignity, its recognition, fulfillment, and universalization." In this chapter, she also argued that: "each and all approaches to peace education can make a significant contribution to...the development of judgement making capacities through the integration of human rights content and perspectives."

Reardon also believed that submitting to authority is a cornerstone of education, arguing that from the first day of school a student learns: "that to succeed means to submit yourself to the order and authority in the community that you’re in."; and that success: "is acknowledging and behaving according to the rules laid down by the authority." Her solution to this is reordering secondary school education. She argued that there needs to be a: "shift from competitive to cooperative modes of learning;... seeing education as bringing forth the capacity to deal with the unprecedented and traditional problems." This is part of her goal to consciously nurture "global peace learning...the things that make for peace." She also said that students should be given: "specific information about the nature of global crises....about the problems that beset the planet...[which would be] a lot of hard content there, but also a continuation of a very strong set of community values." For higher education, she saw universities as a place "where we generate new knowledge". They should also be about: "the search for new knowledge which [comes from] raising the appropriate questions", and continuing to raise "new and relevant questions according to the way the problems present themselves."

Reardon also believed that there must be a recognition that "an intimate relationship between education and society" exists, and that "education is a social institution and practice that is driven by social values. Additionally, she argued that there "exists an intimate relationship between education and society" and that education itself "is an intentional activity...deeply interrelated with the society’s political and ethical background culture."

=== Militarism, sexism, and the war system ===
Reardon had a unique criticism of militarism. She believed that: "militarism is a value system...which says that human beings basically need to be kept in order by force, and that some people have a natural right to use that force in order to do that. They’re better equipped to decide what’s best for the rest of us". If a society is more militarized, then there is a "greater the dependence on force, or the threat of force, to maintain order". She also thought that since World War II, the U.S. had increasingly accepted militarism, which she felt contradicted existing social values and norms.

Beyond her critique of militarism and a militarized society, she believed that sexism and militarism are interconnected. She said that "militarism and sexism are...part of the same problem". The notion "that human differences determine human worth", leads to the arrangement of "people in a hierarchy of social and human value". This hierarchy has "male, European, urban, and [the] technologically proficient" at the top. She also believed that the male-female dichotomy, or gender binary, is integral to sexism and militarism.

Reardon thought a less sexist society would be more peaceful. She believed that in order to confront sexism, people should engage in the processes that would reverse it. Decisions should be made by looking at: "the good of the whole to make decisions about what you do with the resources available for the nation and for the planet" which have been, she argued, called feminine characteristics or traits.

Reardon also held a number of additional views on militarism and peace. She believed that peace is necessary for human flourishing and a fundamental social value, and that a "fully actualized state of negative peace would entail the abolition of war as an institution," which she called the "war system." This is connected to her idea that "conception of peace is profoundly influenced by feminism."

=== Human security ===
Reardon clearly supports the idea of human security. She wrote in a book about state security, that: "as long as war is maintained as a legitimate instrument of national security policy, and preparation for war consumes resources that could be directed toward other essential ongoing needs of human security, human security cannot be achieved.”

=== Internationalism ===
Reardon believes that the world is completely interconnected. She has said in the past, that the world needs to: "move from the anarchy of the war system that we have now as the planetary order into some planetary law system"; and that we need a notion of world community that recognizes that: "the world is a single system, not only ecologically, economically, and in fact, politically", and committing ourselves to making this system a reality. This falls in line with her view that humans inhabit one planet and what we: "have to do as a species is assent to that and recognize and behave as if we are one."

=== Human nature ===
On human nature, Reardon said that humans can be more than they currently are. She said that: "there is more that we as a human species can be, just as there is more that all of us can be no matter what stage in life we are"; and that: "we probably have a really great future; we can be a lot more" if possibilities of a better future are envisioned. She also said that even though humans have: "done some disastrous horrible things to each other and to ourselves in doing it, to our planet", that humans are beginning to understand this and are becoming more tolerant.

== Death ==
Reardon died on November 3, 2023, at the age of 94.

== Written works ==
Partial listing:

- Discrimination: the Cycle of Injustice (1976) ISBN 0039001466.
- Sexism and the War System (1985) ISBN 978-0807727690
- Comprehensive Peace Education: Educating for Global Responsibility (1988) ISBN 0-8077-2885-3
- Learning Peace: the Promise of Ecological and Cooperative Education (1994) ISBN 978-0791417560
- Women and Peace:Feminist Visions of Global Security (1993)(chapter of Women and peace : feminist visions of global security.)
- Educating for Human Dignity: Learning About Rights and Responsibilities (1994) ISBN 978-0-8122-1524-3
- Education for a Culture of Peace in a Gender Perspective (2001) ISBN 978-9231038112
- Learning to Abolish War: Teaching Toward a Culture of Peace (2002)
- Educating for Human Dignity (2002) ISBN 9780812215243
- The Gender Imperative:Human Security vs. State Security ISBN 9780415585774
- Betty A. Reardon: Key Texts in Gender and Peace (2014) ISBN 9783319118086
- Betty A. Reardon: A Pioneer in Education for Peace and Human Rights (2014) ISBN 9783319089669

== Awards ==
- Sean MacBride Prize, International Peace Bureau, 2009
- El Hibri Peace Education Prize, 2013.

== See also ==
- Feminism in international relations
- Cynthia Enloe
- Elise M. Boulding
- List of peace activists
