= The Ribbon International =

United Nations art and advocacy organization

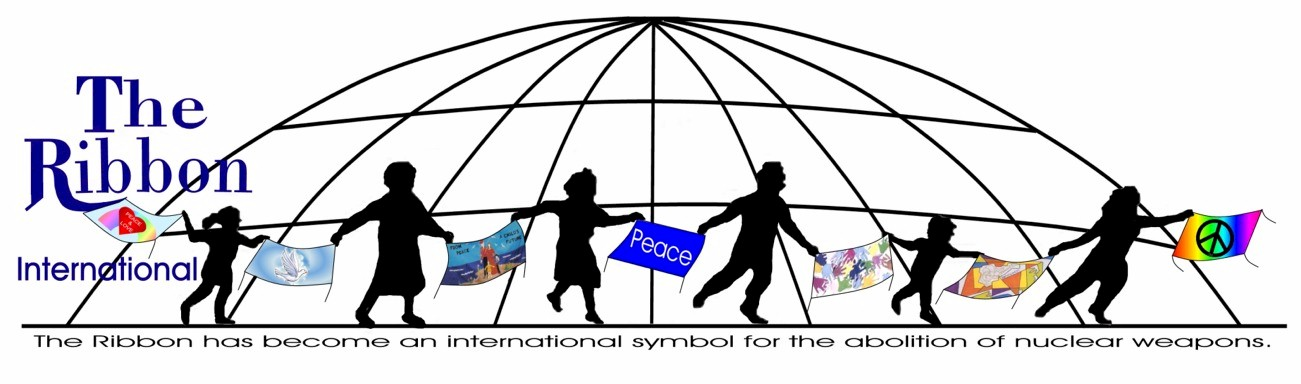

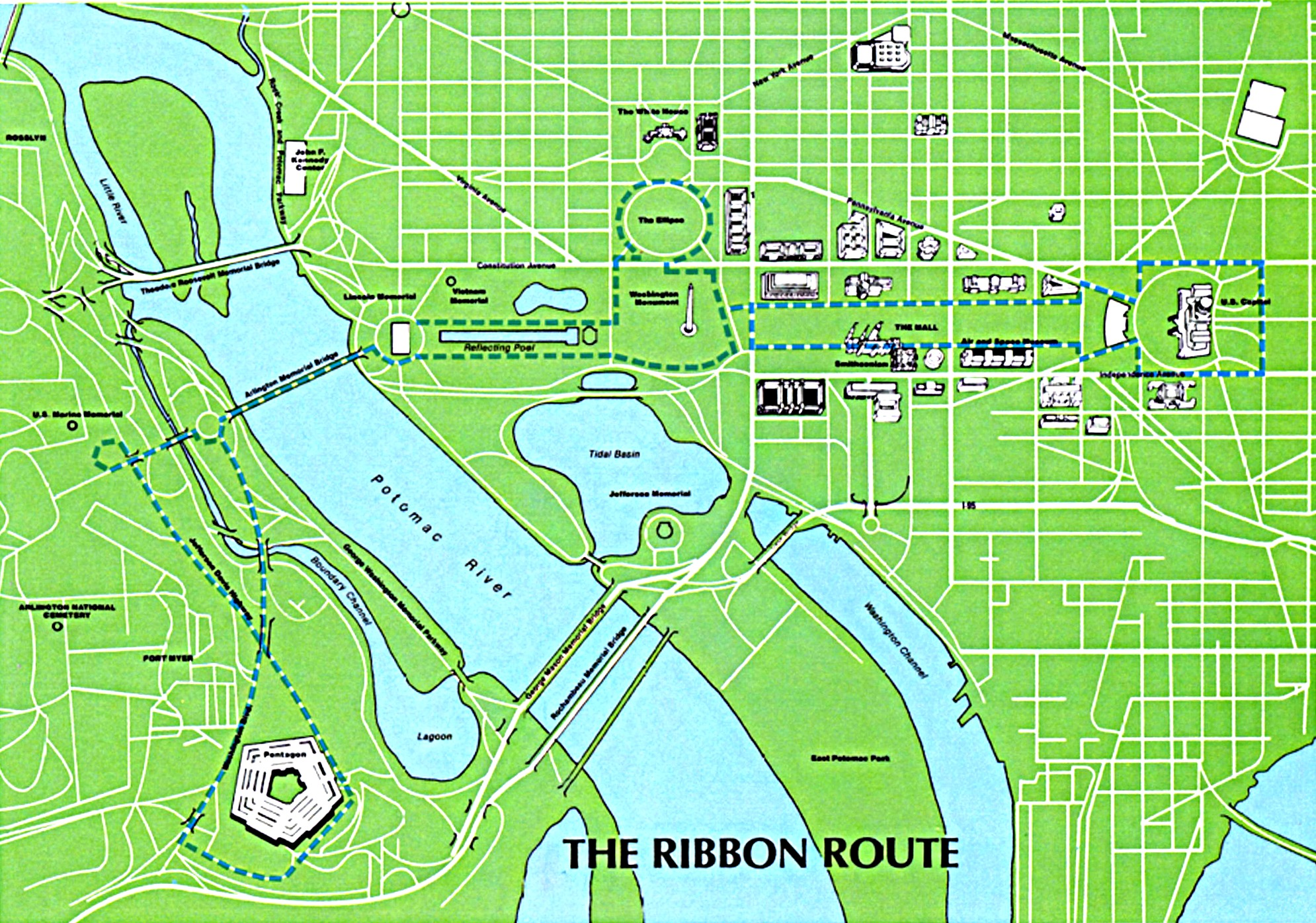
- Route of the Ribbon event held in Washington, D.C., on August 4, 1985
- Formation: April 11, 1983
- Founder: Justine Merritt
- Legal status: United Nations non-governmental organization
- Purpose: Anti-nuclear protest
- Website: www.theribboninternational.org

The Ribbon International is a United Nations non-governmental organization that created a large decorated cloth promoting nuclear disarmament and care and protection of the earth. In an event held on August 4, 1985, panels were connected in an 18 miles (29 km) long strip stretching from the Pentagon into Washington D.C. The event was covered in the film The Ribbon Starts Here by Nigel Noble (1988). Individual sections of the Ribbon are exhibited internationally. In 1991, The Ribbon International became a United Nations Non Governmental Organization. Ribbon events can be held for special designated days such as the International Day of Peace (September 21), Earth Day (April 21), special prayer days or other events. Panels from the Ribbon were displayed at the United Nations Decade for Women international conference in Nairobi in 1985, and others were used by members of Women for a Meaningful Summit at their demonstration at the Geneva Summit (1985). Ribbons were used at peace demonstrations at the Nevada Nuclear Test Site, and the Horse Creek Missile Silo near Cheyenne, Wyoming, and the Great Peace March for Global Nuclear Disarmament in 1986.

== Planning ==
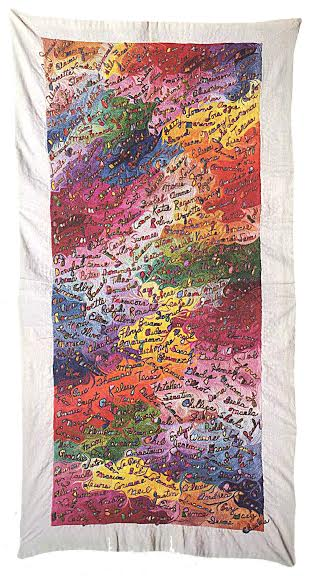
Merritt's first Ribbon panel is embroidered with the names of people she loved.

The Ribbon International was created in 1982 as a protest against nuclear war by Justine Merritt (1924–2009).

In 1975, following a trip to the Hiroshima Peace Memorial Museum in Hiroshima, Japan, Merritt conceived the idea of wrapping the Pentagon with a mile of ribbon. In her words, the wrapping would help to recall "that we love the earth and its people," analogous with tying a string around one's finger to remember something. The wrapping event took place on August 4, 1985, the 40th anniversary of the atomic bombings of Hiroshima and Nagasaki.

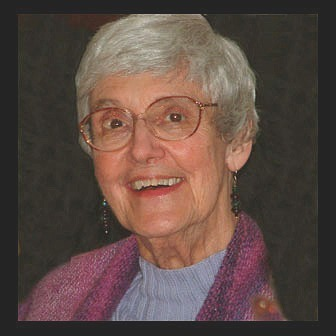
Justine Merritt founded the project.

The Ribbon was made in the three years leading up to the Pentagon event from hundreds of panels created by local groups co-ordinated nationally by Mary Frances Jaster of Denver with state co-ordinators. Each 36 by 18 inches (91 by 46 cm) panel used embroidery, quilting, painting and other techniques. The makers were invited to convey their thoughts and emotions in the panels, with their story on the back.

Friends, relatives, places of worship, and other organizations helped spread Merritt's idea throughout the United States and around the world. Local newsletters and arts and crafts magazines such as Fibre Art, Handwoven, and Quilter's Newsletter Magazine helped publicize the project. Stories leading up to the Pentagon event appeared in over 2,500 publications, including local newspapers and national publications such as McCall's, Mother Jones, People, and Vogue magazine. After the event, coverage appeared in Time magazine and on the front page of the Washington Post. The Ribbon was covered by major radio and television networks. Merritt appeared on Good Morning America in June and August (before the event) and again in November 1985.

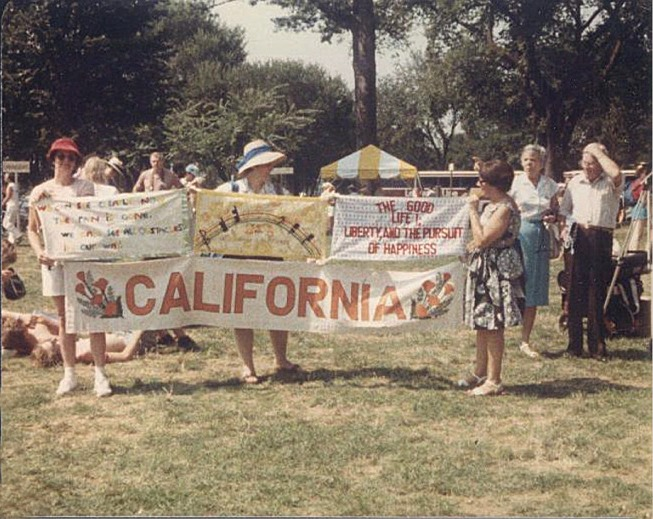
Californians contributed over 3,000 panels.

Panels were received from contributors in every state in the United States. Every state and many towns and organizations held Ribbon joining events. Panels were received from all over the world, including Russia, England, Germany, New Zealand, Italy, Canada, Australia, the Netherlands, and Puerto Rico. A group of women with Church Women United led a grassroots effort around the country, making panels and assisting with preparations in Washington. Their newsletter, which was sent to a half a million members of the Catholic Church, the Russian Orthodox Church in America, the Salvation Army, the Quakers, and 29 other Christian denominations, provided information on how to construct the panels. More than 3,000 Ribbon panels were contributed by this group. The California delegation contributed over 3,000 panels for the Ribbon event. In 1984, they created a display of panels that surrounded Lake Merritt in Oakland. The California group also sent panels to Hiroshima for a Ribbon event that was going to surround the Hiroshima Peace Memorial on the same day as the Pentagon event.

Marie Dennis Grosso, Joan Urbanczyk, and Margaret Schellenberg of the Center for a New Creation (a peace group in Arlington, Virginia) coordinated the Washington event. The center concentrated on peacemaking, poverty and economic justice, human rights, and women's issues. Betty Bumpers, advocate for world peace and wife of former U.S. Senator and Governor of Arkansas Dale Bumpers, also worked on preparations for the Washington event with her group Peace Links, a national nonpartisan organization of women in opposition to the nuclear arms buildup. Organizers planned a 10-to-15-mile (16 to 24 km) route through Washington D.C., and met with various police authorities and the National Park Service to obtain the required permits. Security was of utmost importance; the course from Virginia into Washington travelled past some of the most important buildings and monuments in the country. Forty-nine churches and one senior's center in the Washington area hosted individual state delegations and participants. The churches held a reception for attendees and provided bag lunches, lodging, and transportation. Host churches also displayed panels.

== Events in Washington ==
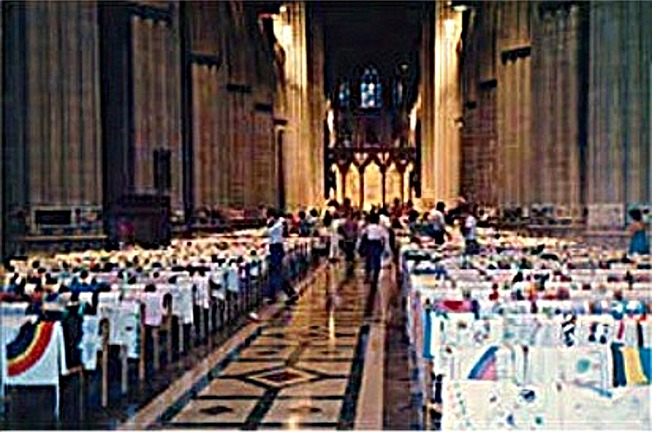
Each of the 2,500 pews in the cathedral was covered with a panel.

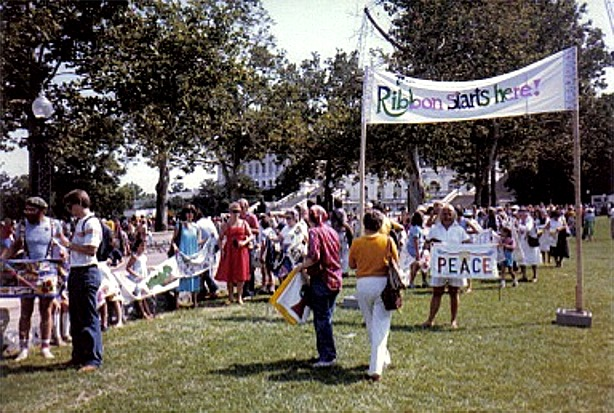
Assembly of the Ribbon gets underway at the United States Capitol, Washington, D.C.

The interfaith service for peace, held on August 3 at the Washington National Cathedral, was attended by 5,000 people. Cathedral staff reported that it was the second-largest crowd ever hosted in the building. Over 4,000 panels were on display during the service. Each pew was decorated, and additional Ribbons were draped and tied in various locations around the building. Twenty bagpipers in Highland dress led a procession of 200 people carrying Ribbons into the cathedral. The service also included dancing, meditation, and a performance by the Howard University Gospel Choir. Survivors of the Hiroshima and Nagasaki bombings were in attendance both at the church service and during The Ribbon event the next day.

When all 27,000 individual panels were joined on August 4, it created a ribbon 18 miles (29 km) long. Don Wilcox of The Craft Report described it as "the largest collaborative craft event in American history". The Ribbon wrapped around the Pentagon building, through the Pentagon parking lot, down the foot paths alongside the Jefferson Davis Highway and Washington Boulevard, crossed the Potomac River into Washington D.C. at the Arlington Memorial Bridge, and travelled into the National Mall area. The Ribbon then went past the Lincoln Memorial, along the south side of the Lincoln Memorial Reflecting Pool, continuing east along the National Mall, and around the U.S.Capitol Building. It then turned west along the north side of the National Mall, went around the Ellipse by the White House, passed the Lincoln Memorial, crossed the Potomac River again and returned to the Pentagon. When the chain of panels was completed, hundreds of balloons were released near the Lincoln Memorial. The entire route was lined with people, and crowds gathered at the three designated speaking areas (the Pentagon, the Lincoln Memorial, and the Capitol). Singers, including Pete Seeger and Tom Chapin, rotated between the three stage areas, performing anti-war songs. Newspapers estimated a total attendance of 30,000 to 100,000 people.

Video filming was done by numerous individuals, and professional television video personnel from New York and Washington, D.C., who donated their time and equipment to create a documentary about the event. The documentary film The Ribbon Starts Here, was produced by Academy Award-winning film maker Nigel Noble, and directed by Nigel Noble and Hilary Raff Lindsay; Nobel Enterprises. The video was released in 1988.

== Subsequent events ==
After August 4, state coordinators returned home with their Ribbon panels, which were then displayed in libraries, schools, and museums, and used in parades and events. Historical societies and universities now house historical information about the Ribbon and archival collections of panels. Some of the Ribbons and panels were selected as gallery pieces, and are on display in The Peace Museum in Chicago. Sixty Ribbons were selected by the Smithsonian Institution for its political history collection, and others were given to the United Nations. The Texas Women's University in Denton, Texas hosts a major collection of panels and documentation. Panels were also sent to the National Textile Museum.

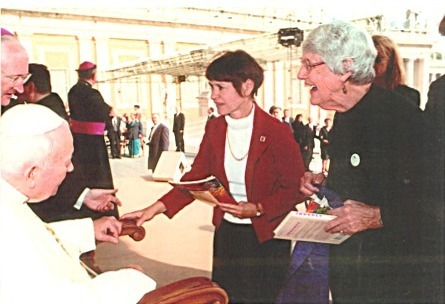
Pope John Paul II, Michele Peppers and Justine Merritt at the Vatican, Rome, October 17, 2001

The Ribbon evolved into The Ribbon International in the late 1980s, and became a United Nations Non Governmental Organization in 1991. Ribbon events can be held for special designated days such as the International Day of Peace (September 21), Earth Day (April 21), special prayer days or other events. Any individual or group can create a panel for a Ribbon, start a Ribbon in their community, or give a panel as a gift to someone who is engaged in promoting peace, environmental causes, or disarmament.

New panels continue to be created for display at various environmental and peace events. Ribbons have been given to the New York City Council, Russian President Mikhail Gorbachev, Indian Prime Minister Rajiv Gandhi, and Pope John Paul II. Panels from the Ribbon were displayed at the United Nations Decade for Women international conference in Nairobi in 1985, and others were used by members of Women for a Meaningful Summit at their demonstration at the Geneva Summit (1985). Ribbons were used at peace demonstrations at the Nevada Nuclear Test Site, and the Horse Creek Missile Silo near Cheyenne, Wyoming, and the Great Peace March for Global Nuclear Disarmament in 1986.

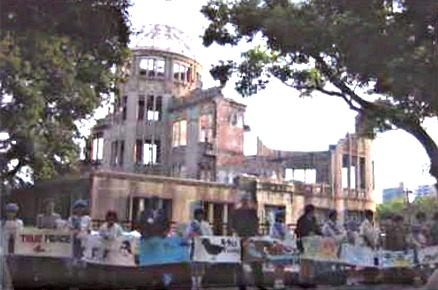
Ribbons surround the Hiroshima Peace Memorial ending the conference "Building a Just and Sustainable Peace." April 3, 2006.

In 2000, with the help of Betty Bumpers and her group Peace Links, the Ribbon International United Nations Non Governmental Committee gave each U.S. congressional leader a Ribbon for the United Nations International Year for the Culture of Peace, and for the International Decade for the Promotion of a Culture of Peace and Non-Violence for the Children of the World, 2001–2010. Some congressional leaders displayed the Ribbon in their offices.

Every year the municipality and city of Lugansk, Ukraine takes part in the Ribbon project. Annual events are held in Marion and Gas City, Indiana, and in Lake Havasu, Arizona, where people create Ribbons and hold a Ribbon event for United Nations Day (October 24) or other peace related days.

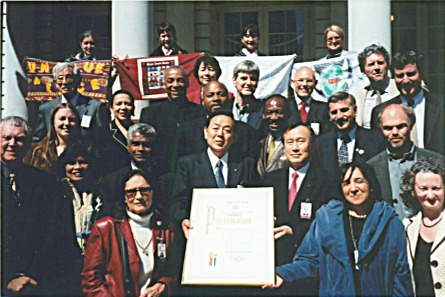
The first Nuclear Weapons Abolition Day. New York City, April 28, 2004

In Japan, the city of Hiroshima includes Ribbons and prayers for peace in their annual commemoration of the nuclear bombing. In Israel, Interns for Peace works with Israeli and Palestinian youth to stage Ribbon events, joining them together at the Gaza Strip. In New Zealand, people joined Ribbons around the United States and Russian Embassies in Wellington. From 2002 to 2012, the Ribbon committee in New York City annually joined Ribbons, starting at the United Nations Headquarters and travelling to the World Trade Center. After the September 11 attacks, Merritt called the Ribbon the "Ribbon of Tangible Hope". She wanted to create a Ribbon long enough to stretch from the United Nations to the World Trade Center Memorial site and to a Muslim shrine.

The Ribbon Committee worked with New York City Council on Nuclear Weapons Abolition Day, held April 28, 2004. Over the years, Church Women United has wrapped the Ribbon around numerous sites. The group held a peace litany joining "the Ribbon of Tangible Hope" in the state capital building in Oklahoma City on the fifteenth anniversary of the Oklahoma City bombing.

== Gallery ==
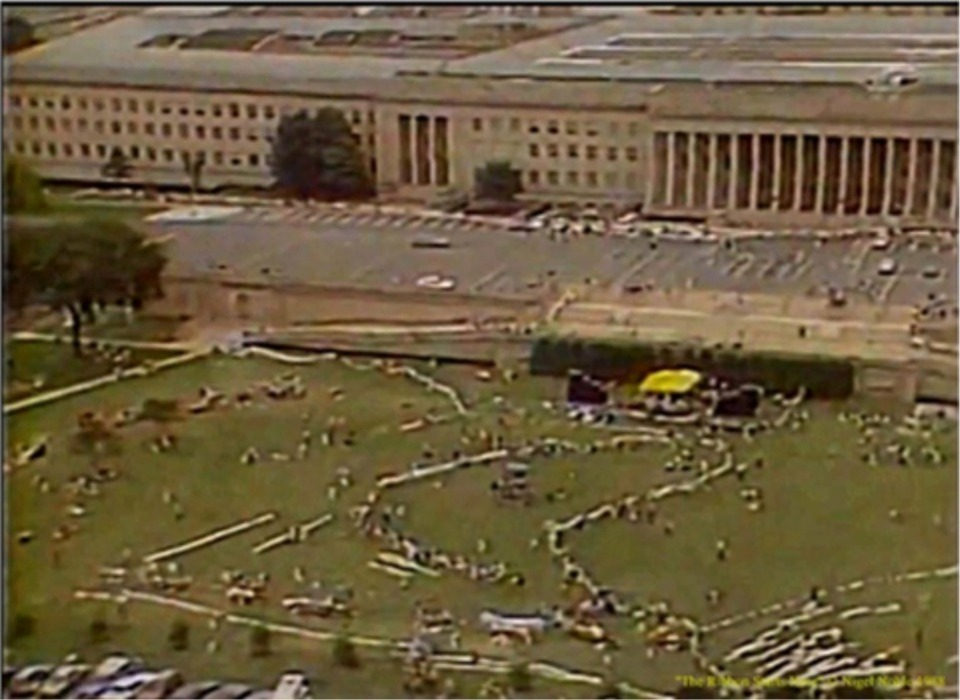
The Ribbon forms at the Pentagon

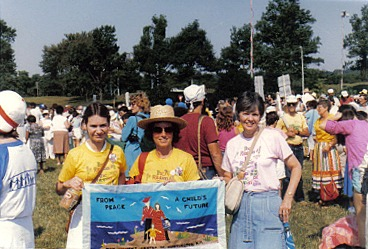
Ribbon panel "From Peace a Child's Future", created by the Women's Center, Huntington, NY

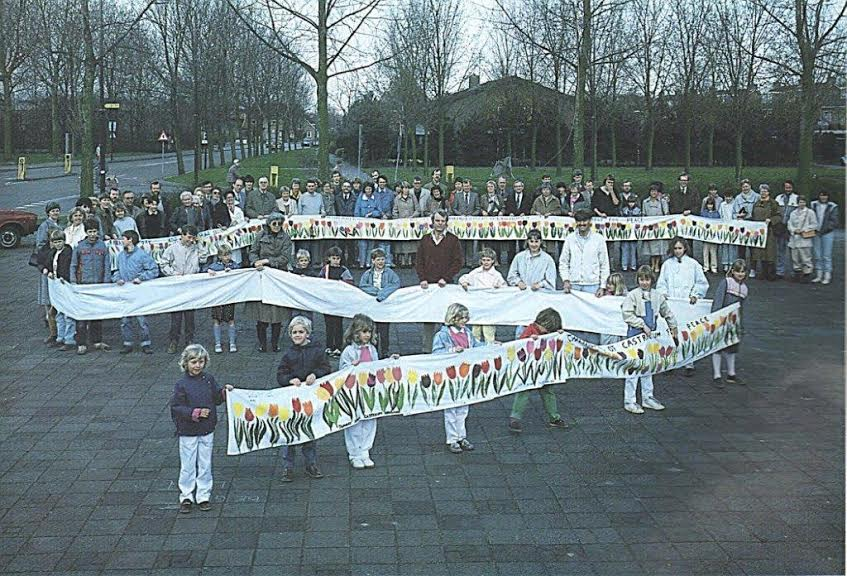
A 150-foot panel of tulips, sent from the Netherlands, was displayed beside the Lincoln Memorial Reflecting Pool.

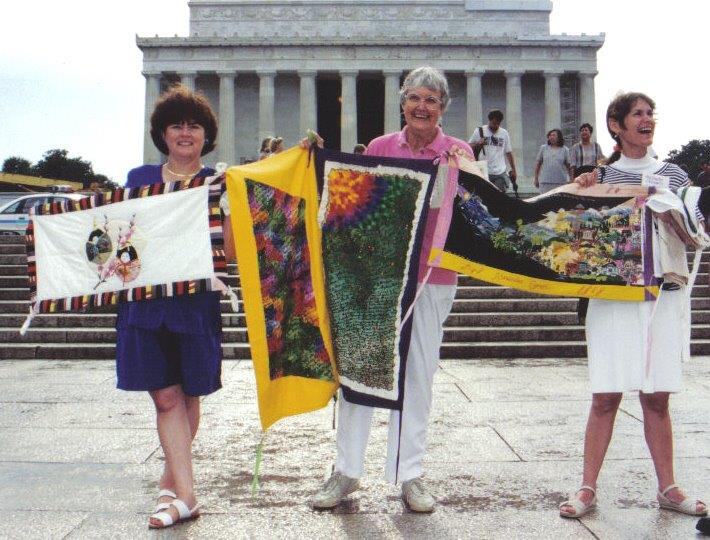
Monica Willard, Justine Merritt, and Michele Peppers meet on the event's tenth anniversary. Merritt is holding two of the Ribbon panels she embroidered.

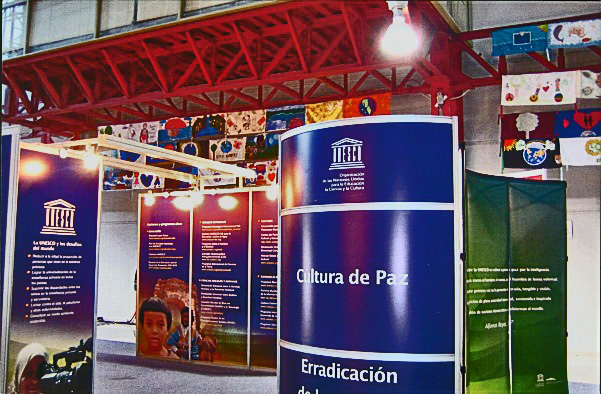
Ribbons created and displayed in Monterrey, Mexico for the UNESCO Universal Forum of Cultures. October 2007.

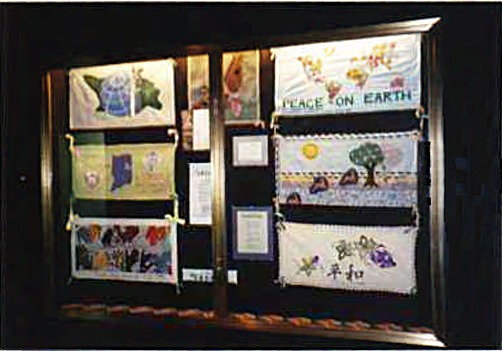
Ribbons exhibited at the Rockefeller Center, New York. Panels (top to bottom) are from Georgia, Russian Federation; Indiana; New York City; Oklahoma; the United States; and Japan.

== See also ==
- Mayors for Peace
- NAMES Project AIDS Memorial Quilt

== Sources ==
- Pershing, Linda (1996). The Ribbon Around the Pentagon: Peace by Piecemakers. Knoxville, TN: University of Tennessee Press. ISBN 0-87049-922-X.

== Videos ==
- The Ribbon. (1985, 20 minutes, color) Produced by WAND; gives a brief history of how the Ribbon was started in CA and shows preliminary events leading up to the Ribbon around the Pentagon.
- The Ribbon In South Africa. (1986, 45 minutes, color) Documentary video on how black and white mothers used the Ribbon project, creating panels and having Ribbon events in front of government buildings to protest their sons going to war and killing each other in South Africa. Ed. by Harriet Gavshon, produced by Co-operation for Development International, Ltd. (CDI).
