= Group on International Perspectives on Governmental Aggression and Peace =

Peace organization

The Group on International Perspectives on Governmental Aggression and Peace (GIPGAP) is an international multi-disciplinary team of academics and researchers. The group has been undertaking extensive research into social attitudes to peace and war, using the Personal and Institutional Rights to Aggression and Peace Scale, or PAIRTAPS. There is no shortage of critical literature on peace and war. However this is the first-ever global study of the attitudes of ordinary citizens to peace and war. GIPGAP is co-ordinated by Kathleen Malley-Morrison of Boston University, and has its origins in an earlier group that investigated domestic violence within a project entitled International Perspectives on Family Violence and Abuse. The GIPGAP project involves surveying and analysis of the views of citizens from more than 30 countries —covering North America, South America, Central America, Western Europe, Eastern Europe, the Middle East, Africa, the Asia Pacific, South Asia, Australia, and the Pacific Islands.

== GIGAP membership ==
The GIPGAP website indicates the membership as follows:

Kathleen Malley-Morrison(International Coordinator)	Abdelkader Abdelali	Jacqui Akhurst
Kareem Al-Obaidi	Flavia Angelino	Ricardo Angelino
Majed Ashy	Davies Banda	Rodrigo Barahona
Ana Barbeiro	Mariana Barbosa	Scott Edward Borrelli
Helena Castanheira	Nina Carstens	Megan Clapp
Amanda Clinton	Michael Corgan	Mahlon B. Dalley
Maria Daskalopoulos	Priscilla Dass-Brailsford	Helena Syna Desilvilya
Eros DeSouza	Regina Estuar	Eric Fischer
Maria Galmarini	Lauren M. Groves	Asifa Hasan
Denise Hines	Etsuko Hoshino-Browne	Jas Laile Suzana Binti Jaafar
Mikyung Jang	Linda Jeffrey	Janice Jones
Mohammad Shahid Kamal	Charles H. Kennedy	Mi-Sung Kim
Julia König	Mark Leach	Elisabeth Leembruggen-Kallberg
Graham Lindegger	Carla Machado	Raquel Matos
Alfred L. McAlister	Sheri McCarthy	Rick McNeese
Andrea Mercurio	Heyam Mohammed	Alice Murata
Aretha Nasroen	Nyryan V. Nolido	David Young Oh
Silja Bára Ómarsdóttir	James Page	Nebojsa Petrovic
Marko Polič	Ellora Puri	Kimberly Rapoza
Megan Reif	Eddy Carrillo Retana	José Anazagasty Rodríguez
Christine Roland-Lévy	R.S. Rose	Maki Sakuma
Mathilde Salmberg	Natoschia Scruggs	Darshini Shah
Stephen Shalom	Syafuan Rozi Soebhan	Stephen Soldz
Michael Stevens	Sarah Stuart	Shiho Takagi
William J. Tastle	Elina Tochilnikova	Abram Trosky
Charikleia A. Tsatsaroni	Feryal Turan	Doe West
John M. Whiteley	Michael Whitely	Alev Yalçinkaya
Dalit Yassour-Borochowitz	Rouba Youssef	Tanvi Zaveri

== Research instrument ==
The basic research instrument, the Personal and Institutional Rights to Aggression and Peace Scale, is an online survey, utilizing aspects of both qualitative research and quantitative research. Respondents are encouraged to indicate the degree to which they agree or disagree with certain propositions and the instrument also encourages respondents to make specific comment upon issues. The survey is available to respondents in a range of language versions, including English, French, German, Greek, Icelandic, Italian, Japanese, and Portuguese.

== Research findings ==
Preliminary findings for individual countries can be found in the publications list and especially the 4-volume publication in 2009 by Praeger International. In general, there was disapproval for the notion that nations should have a right to invade other nations, disapproval for the use of torture, disapproval for the killing of civilians, approval for the right to protest war, and tentative approval for the notion of a right to peace. Women were very much in support of the notion of the right of children to grow up in a world of peace. Further research, analysis and scholarly publication is planned for the future.

== GIPGAP research publications ==
=== Books ===
- GIPGAP (2009) State Violence and the Right to Peace. Ed. K. Malley-Morrison. 4 Volumes. Westport: Praeger Security International.
- GIPGAP (2013) International Handbook on War, Torture and Terrorism. Ed. K. Malley-Morrison. New York: Springer.
- GIPGAP (2013) International Handbook on Peace and Reconciliation. Ed. K. Malley-Morrison. New York: Springer.

=== Journal articles ===
- Ashy, M.A. & Malley-Morrison, K. (2007). Attitudes towards war in the Middle East from an extremism model perspective. International Psychology Bulletin,11, 8–11.
- Castanheira, H., Corgan, M. & Malley-Morrison, K. (2007). Is peace possible? Citizens´ views. Peace Psychology
- Corgan, M., & Malley-Morrison, K. (2008, Spring). Operation Urgent Folly. International Psychology Bulletin, 28–30.
- Corgan, M., Malley-Morrison, K., & Castanheira, H. (2008). Peace restoration: An ecological formulation. Peace Psychology. 16(2): 8–9.
- Daskalopoulos, M., Zaveri, T., & Malley-Morrison, K. (2006). Greek, Spanish and American perspectives on the right of a country to invade. Peace Psychology, 15(2), 12–14.
- Hashim, K. & Malley-Morrison, K. (2007. Summer). Attitudes toward international treaties and human rights agreements, Peace Psychology, 16, 1
- Lee, Y., Jang, M., Malley-Morrison, K. (2008, Summer). Perceptions of Child Maltreatment in European Americans, Korean Americans, and Koreans. International Psychology Bulletin, 12, 13–16.
- Malley-Morrison, K., & Castanheira, H. (2008). Can governmental aggression be acceptable? Views from the United States and Spain. International Psychology Bulletin, 12(1), 16–21.
- Malley-Morrison, K., Corgan, M., & Castanheira, H.(2007, Fall). Security as an individual and international Issue, International Psychology Bulletin, 11, 30–32.
- Malley-Morrison, K., Daskalopoulos, M., & You, H-S. (2006, winter). International perspectives on governmental aggression, International Psychology Reporter, 19–20.
- Malley-Morrison, K. et al. (2006, spring). International perspectives on war and peace. Peace Psychology, 15(1), 6–7.
- Mercurio, A. E., You, H. S., & Malley-Morrison, K. (2006, Spring). Reasoning about parental rights to physically discipline children in the United States and Korea. International Psychology Bulletin, 10, 12–13.
