= International Day of Peace =

Annual observance dedicated to world peace

- Observed by: All UN member states
- Type: United Nations International Declaration
- Celebrations: Multiple world wide events
- Date: 21 September
- Next time: 21 September 2027
- Duration: 24 hours
- Frequency: Annual
- First time: 1981; 45 years ago
- Related to: Peace Movements

The International Day of Peace, also officially known as World Peace Day, is a United Nations-sanctioned holiday observed annually on 21 September. It is dedicated to world peace, and specifically the absence of war and violence, such as might be occasioned by a temporary ceasefire in a combat zone for humanitarian aid access. The day was first established in 1981 and first observed in September 1982 and is kept by many nations, political groups, military groups, and people.

To inaugurate the day, the United Nations Peace Bell is rung at UN Headquarters (in New York City). The bell is cast from coins donated by people from all continents except Africa, and was a gift from the United Nations Association of Japan, as "a reminder of the human cost of war"; the inscription on its side reads, "Long live absolute world peace".

In 2018, a searchable map of events has been published at un.org.

== History ==
=== 1981 – UN General Assembly Resolution passed ===
The United Nations General Assembly declared, in a resolution sponsored by the United Kingdom and Costa Rica, the International Day of Peace, to be devoted to commemorating and strengthening the ideals of peace. The date initially chosen was the regular opening day of the annual sessions of the General Assembly, the third Tuesday of September. (This was changed in 2001 to the current annual celebration on 21 September each year — see 2001 below.)

=== 1983 – Annual Reports ===
Beginning in 1983, at the request of the Office of the Secretary-General of the United Nations, Pathways To Peace (PTP) submitted a "We the Peoples" Initiative Annual Report to the UN, summarizing the Peace Day activities. The reports from 2005 and 2009 are available as archives as cited below. For its initiatives for the International Year of Peace in 1987, PTP was granted "Peace Messenger" status by UN Secretary-General Perez de Cuellar. In 2006 the name was changed from "We the Peoples" Initiative to "Culture of Peace Initiative."

=== 1996 – Seanad Éireann debate ===
A proposal for expanding the International Day of Peace to include Reconciliation, in which a massive number of emblems (White Doves) would be distributed after a formal presentation at the United Nations, was put forward by Vincent Coyle, of Derry, Northern Ireland, and was debated at Seanad Éireann. It was accepted that it would be impractical for one member state to ask for a particular slot at a general UN ceremony. However, events have been held at the United Nations in New York, with the support of Kofi Annan, in April.

=== 2001 – Date set at 21 September ===
In 2001 the opening day of the General Assembly was scheduled for 11 September, and Secretary General Kofi Annan drafted a message recognising the observance of International Peace Day on 21 September. The September 11 attacks, often referred to as 9/11, were perpetrated on that same day when a series of four coordinated terrorist attacks by the militant Islamist terrorist group al-Qaeda against the United States of America occurred just blocks away from the UN on the morning of Tuesday, September 11, 2001. That year the day was changed from the third Tuesday to specifically the twenty-first day of September, to take effect in 2002. A new resolution was passed by the General Assembly, sponsored by the United Kingdom (giving credit to Peace One Day) and Costa Rica (the original sponsors of the day), to give the International Day of Peace a fixed calendar date, 21 September, and declare it also as a day of global ceasefire and non-violence.

=== 2004 – Taiwanese commemorative stamp controversy ===
A diplomatic stir occurred when Lions Clubs International sponsored a competition for six posters to be used for International Day of Peace commemorative stamps issued by the UN Postal Administration. A poster by 15-year-old Taiwanese school student Yang Chih-Yuan was announced as one of the winners, but the announcement was withdrawn. Taiwan media reports, Taiwan Lions Club and the government of Taiwan claimed the decision not to use the poster resulted from pressure from China; the rejection of the student's painting on political grounds did not reflect the ideals of the International Day of Peace. The UN issued a statement that, although in the shortlist of eight designs, "due to an internal misunderstanding and miscommunication, Mr. Yang's proof got publicized in error as one of the six stamps intended to be issued." The government of Taiwan (Republic of China) later issued a stamp containing the image.

=== 2005 – UN Secretary General calls for 22-hour ceasefire ===
In 2005, United Nations Secretary-General Kofi Annan called for the worldwide observance of a 22-hour ceasefire and day of nonviolence to mark the Day.

==== Global survey of celebration ====
The Culture of Peace Initiative published an annual report for the International Day of Peace in 2005 describing events in 46 countries: Africa 11; East Asia and Pacific 12; Latin America and Caribbean 4; Europe 14; Middle East 3; North America 2 (22 states, provinces).

=== 2006 – Peace Parade, UK ===
In 2006, then Secretary-General Kofi Annan rang the Peace Bell for the last time during his term in office. That year the UN asserted the "many ways it works for peace and to encourage individuals, groups and communities around the world to contemplate and communicate thoughts and activities on how to achieve peace." The United Kingdom held the primary public and official observation of the United Nations International Day of Peace and Non-Violence in Rochdale, Greater Manchester, organized by Peace Parade UK.

=== 2007 – UN Secretary General calls for worldwide moment of silence ===
In 2007, UN Secretary General Ban Ki-moon rang the Peace Bell at United Nations Headquarters in New York calling for a 24-hour cessation of hostilities on 21 September, and for a minute of silence to be observed around the world.

=== 2009 – International Year of Reconciliation announced ===
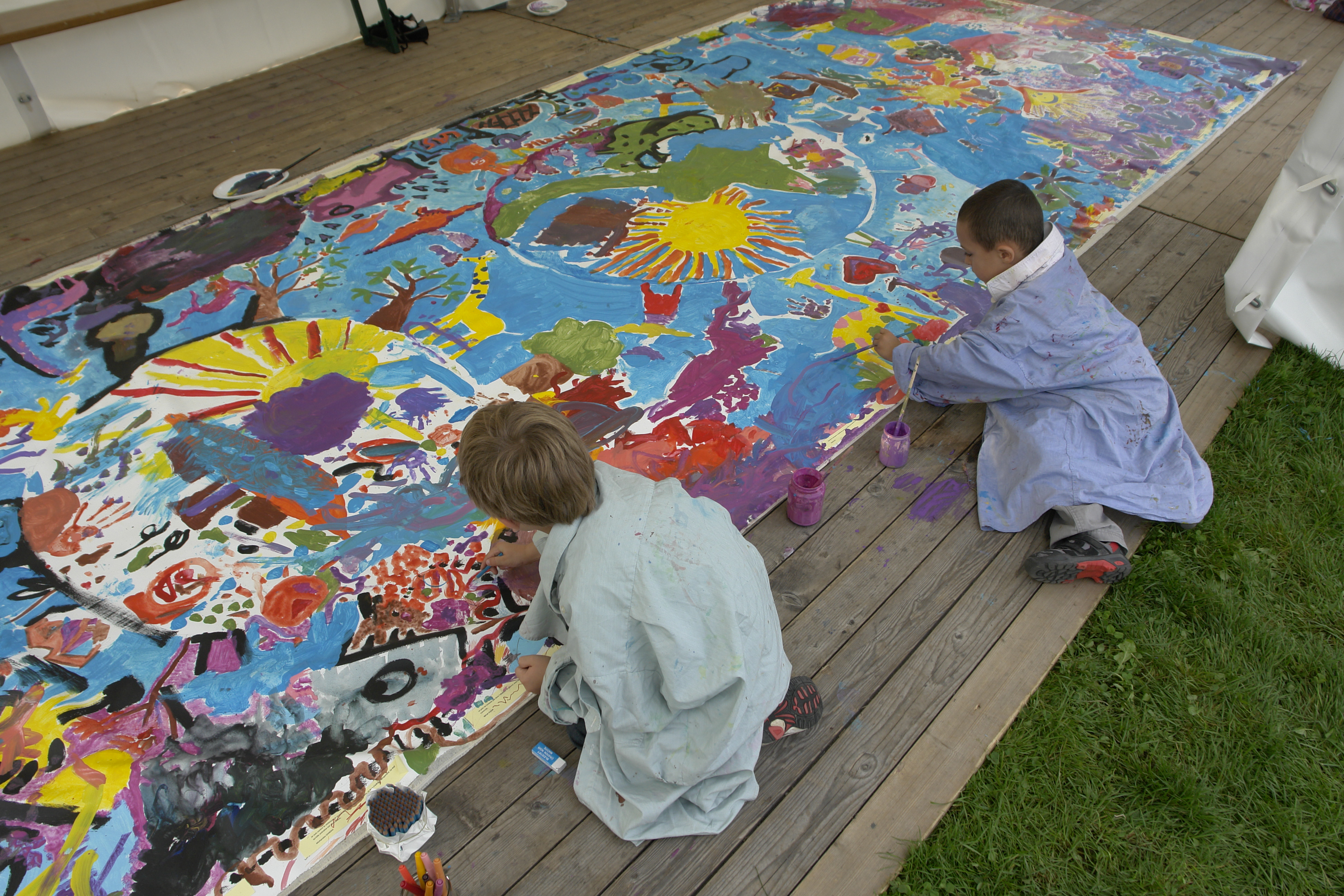
Painting by children, International Peace Day 2009, Geneva

In 2009 – International Year of Reconciliation – the day was marked by a massive number of white doves being distributed after a formal presentation at the United Nations, bearing in mind the Charter of the United Nations, including the purposes and principles contained therein, and in particular those of saving succeeding generations from the scourge of war, bringing about by peaceful means, and in conformity with the principles of justice and international law, adjustment or settlement of international disputes or situations which might lead to a breach of the peace, and practising tolerance and living together in peace with one another as good neighbours, thus developing friendly relations among nations and promoting international cooperation to resolve international economic, social and cultural rights and humanitarian issues. Vincent Coyle of Derry, Northern Ireland gave his full support.

==== 2009 International Day of Peace: WMD – We Must Disarm ====
"Take Action for a World Free of Nuclear Weapons ... Disarmament and non-proliferation...to raise awareness of the dangers and costs of nuclear weapons, and on why nuclear disarmament and non-proliferation are so crucial."

==== Global survey of celebration ====
The Culture of Peace Initiative published an annual report for the International Day of Peace in 2009 describing events in 77 countries: Africa 14; East Asia and Pacific 20; Latin America and Caribbean 11; Europe 23; Middle East 7; North America 2 countries (48 states, provinces).

=== 2010 – Youth for Peace and Development ===
"The United Nations is looking for stories from young people around the world who are working for peace. The campaign slogan this year is Peace=Future, The math is easy."

=== 2011 – Peace and Democracy: Make Your Voice Heard ===
In 2011 the UN Peace Day's theme was "Peace and Democracy: Make Your Voice Heard". Many organizations held Peace Day events worldwide in 2011. There were school activities, music concerts, global comedy clubs (www.thinkPEACE.net), peace doves, prayer vigils, peace conferences, and UN activities. Organizations like Peace One Day, Wiser and Culture of Peace have been active participants in Peace Day activities for years.

=== 2012 – Sustainable Peace for a Sustainable Future ===
In 2012, the United Nations set the theme for the year's observance as Sustainable Peace for a Sustainable Future, commemorating and strengthening the ideals of peace both within and among all nations and peoples.

==== Global Truce Day 2012 ====
In 2011, Peace One Day announced at their O2 Arena concert, a new international campaign called Global Truce 2012, a grassroots initiative and international coalition with non-governmental organisations and students' unions in every continent, which increased participation and action on Peace Day 2012, the day of Global Truce. Particular focus in this campaign included a cessation of hostilities on the day and a reduction of domestic violence and bullying in society. The Peace One Day Celebration concert on Peace Day in 2012 was held at Wembley Arena to celebrate Global Truce 2012. The Global Truce campaign will continue and be named with each year it leads up to, involving more partners and coalitions for mass participation and life-saving practical action on Peace Day.

=== 2013 – Focus on Peace education ===
UN Secretary General Ban Ki Moon dedicated the World Peace Day 2013 to peace education in an effort to refocus minds and financing on the preeminence of peace education as the means to bring about a culture of peace. Animator and children's book author Sue DiCicco announced in May 2013 a global campaign to increase awareness of Peace Day and promote peace education within schools and community groups through the Peace Crane Project. Gorey Community School in County Wexford, Ireland, was chosen to be School of Peace for 2013.

==== Global Truce 2013 ====
Peace One Day launched a new theme for Global Truce 2013: Who Will You Make Peace With?

==== Peace Day Comedy 2013 ====
To bring awareness to Peace Day, thinkPEACE promoted a Peace Day Comedy program, "Stand-Up For International Peace," held in over 50 global comedy clubs in 2013.

=== 2014 – Right to Peace ===
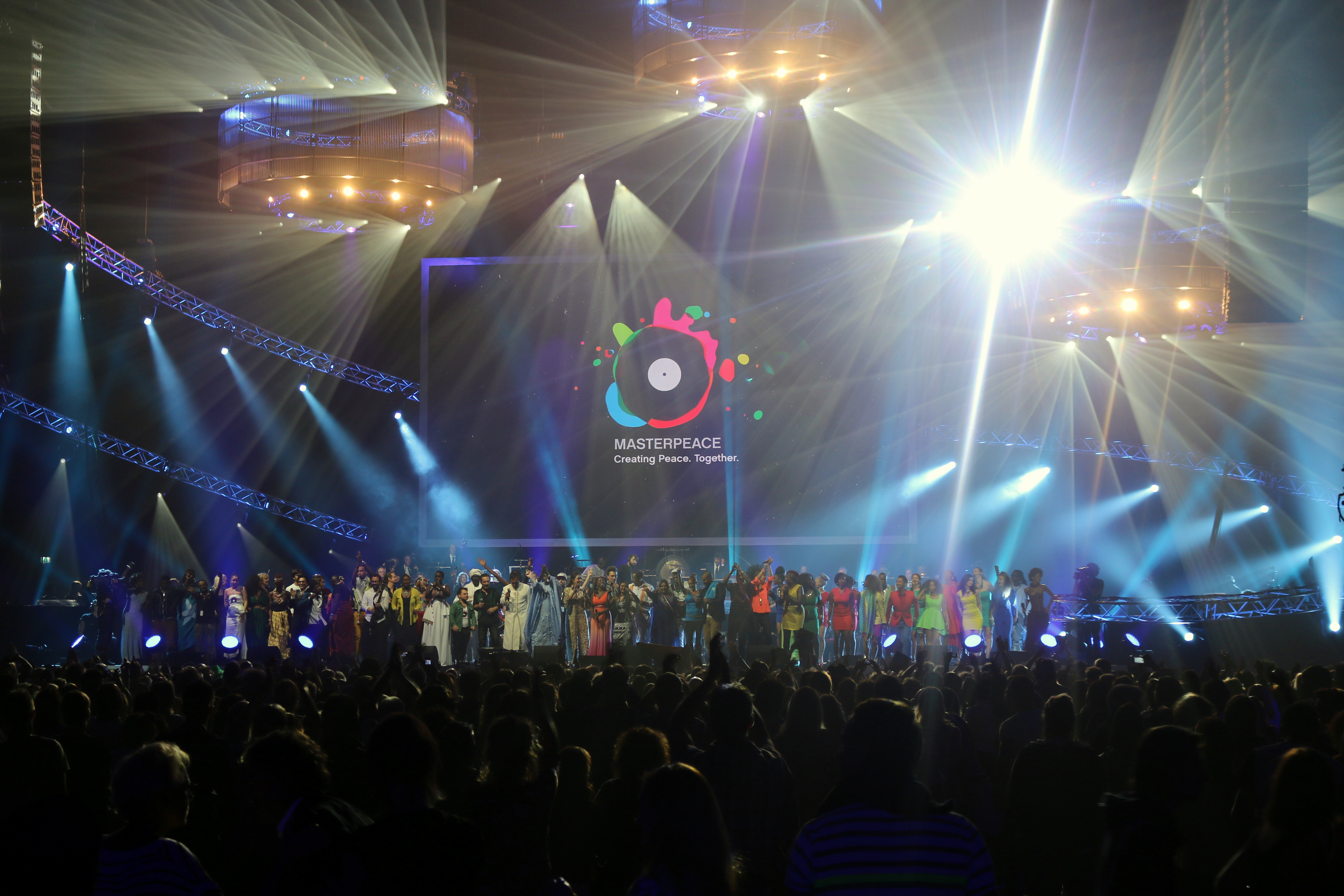
The concert of INTERNATIONAL DAY OF PEACE at Amsterdam's Ziggo Dome. 21 September 2014 (organized by MasterPeace)

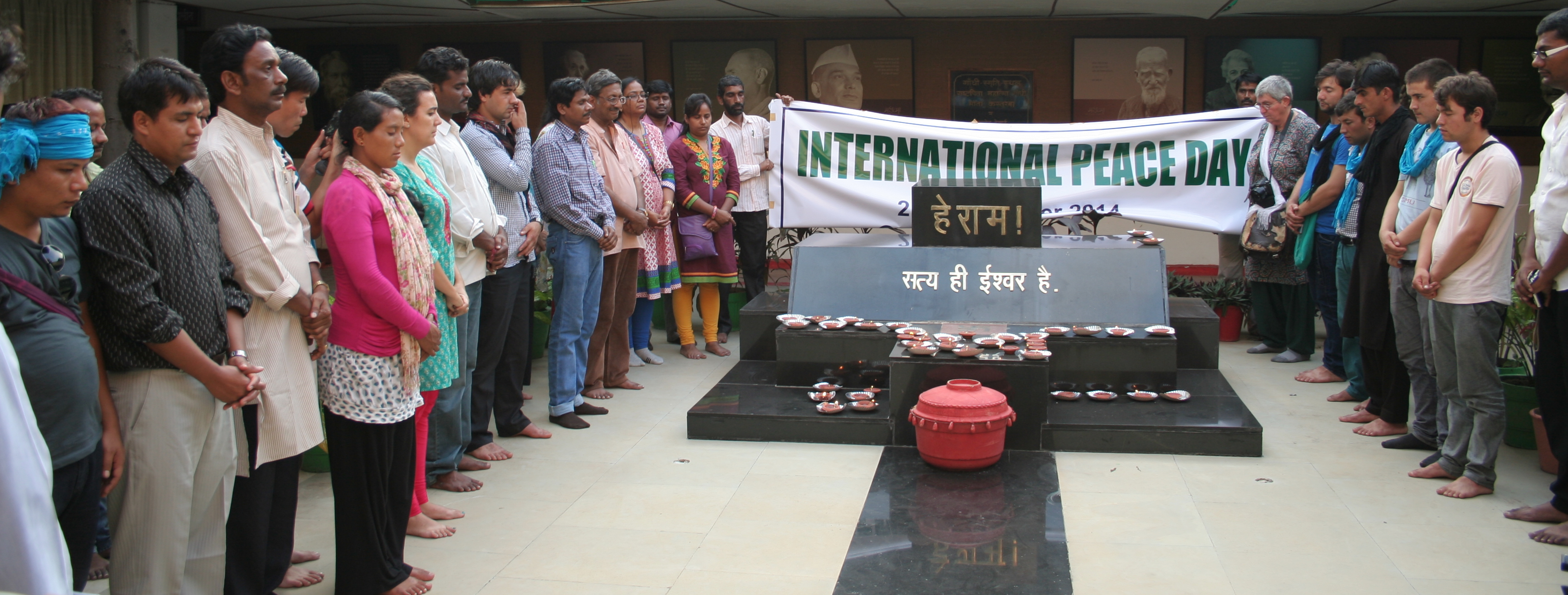
International Peace Day ceremony, organised by Ekta Parishad, Gandhi Bhawan, Bhopal, India, September 2014

The theme of the 2014 International Day of Peace was the Right of Peoples to Peace, reaffirming the United Nations commitment to the UN Declaration on the Right of Peoples to Peace, which recognizes that the promotion of peace is vital for the full enjoyment of all human rights.

==== 2014 Peace Day Comedy program ====
To bring awareness to Peace Day 2014, the thinkPEACE Network promoted a Peace Day Comedy program, "Stand-Up For International Peace," to be held in over 50 global comedy clubs.

==== Waves Of Kindness global meditation events ====
The Waves Of Kindness Global Initiative celebrated the United Nations International Day Of Peace though global meditation events.

==== Comment in Global Education Magazine ====
Director of UNESCO to Vietnam Katherine Müller said in Global Education Magazine: "I personally identify with UNESCO's values in the sense that I truly believe Education, Culture, Social and Natural Sciences, and Communication and Information are some of the most powerful drivers for sustainable development and peace, as a sustainable future cannot exist without sustainable peace. Raising awareness, capacity building, promoting understanding and respect for diversity, and fostering opportunities for interaction to find ways to ensure a culture of peace are all actions that will motivate people to become interested in setting peace as a priority for sustainable development."

=== 2015 – Partnerships for Peace – Dignity for All ===
The theme of the 2015 International Day of Peace was "Partnerships for Peace – Dignity for All".

=== 2016 – The Sustainable Development Goals: Building Blocks for Peace ===
The theme of the 2016 International Day of Peace was "The Sustainable Development Goals: Building Blocks for Peace".

=== 2017 – Together for Peace: Respect, Safety and Dignity for All ===
This theme was based on the TOGETHER global campaign that promotes respect, safety and dignity for everyone forced to flee their homes in search of a better life.

==== The Peace Crane Project ====
In 2017, The Peace Crane Project announced the goal of collecting 1,000 cranes from students around the world to display in various venues to celebrate.

==== 2017 Global survey of celebration ====
A survey by the Culture of Peace News Network found internet reports about 562 celebrations of the International Day of Peace from 127 countries around the world this year. These included 128 events coming from most of the provinces and states in Canada and the USA. Next were the countries formerly part of the Soviet Union with 104. There were 96 events cited in 27 European countries, 81 from 29 African countries, 67 from 20 Asian countries, 58 from 16 Latin American and Caribbean countries, and 28 from 21 Arab and Middle Eastern countries.

=== 2018 – The Right to Peace – The Universal Declaration of Human Rights at 70 ===
The 2018 U.N. Peace Day Theme was "The Right to Peace – The Universal Declaration of Human Rights at 70."

==== 2018 Global survey of celebration ====
A survey by the Culture of Peace News Network found internet reports about 764 celebrations of the International Day of Peace from 129 countries around the world this year. These included 233 events coming from most of the provinces and states in Canada and the USA. Next were 177 events from Europe and 158 events from Asia. There were 95 events from Latin America and the Caribbean, 71 events from countries formerly part of the Soviet Union, 71 from Africa, and 15 from Arab and Middle Eastern countries.

=== 2019 – Climate Action for Peace ===
The United Nations selected the theme "Climate Action for Peace" for the 2019 International Day of Peace.

According to the UN website, "The United Nations calls upon all to take action to tackle climate change."

"On 23 September [2019], the United Nations is convening a Climate Action Summit with concrete and realistic plans to accelerate action to implement the Paris Agreement."

The International Day of Peace Student Observance on 20 September 2019 at United Nations Headquarters featured young people presenting their projects to fight climate change and promote peace.

==== 2019 Global survey of celebration ====
A survey by the Culture of Peace News Network found internet reports concerning more than 655 celebrations of the International Day of Peace from 103 countries around the world in 2019.

=== 2020 – Shaping Peace Together ===
The United Nations has selected the theme "Shaping Peace Together" for the 2020 International Day of Peace.

According to the UN website, "This year, it has been clearer than ever that we are not each other's enemies. Rather, our common enemy is a tireless virus that threatens our health, security and very way of life. COVID-19 has thrown our world into turmoil and forcibly reminded us that what happens in one part of the planet can impact people everywhere."

==== 2020 global survey of celebration ====
A survey by the Culture of Peace News Network found internet reports concerning more than 717 celebrations of the International Day of Peace from 78 countries around the world this year. The largest number came from Western Europe and from the European countries formerly part of the Soviet Union.

=== 2021 – Recovering Better for an Equitable and Sustainable World ===
The 2021 theme for the International Day of Peace was "Recovering Better for an Equitable and Sustainable World.'"

==== 2021 global survey of celebration ====
A survey by the Culture of Peace News Network found internet reports concerning more than 628 celebrations of the International Day of Peace from 79 countries around the world in 2021.

=== 2022 – End racism. Build peace. ===
The 2022 theme for the International Day of Peace was "End racism. Build peace."

==== 2022 global survey of celebration ====
A survey by the Culture of Peace News Network found internet reports concerning more than 846 celebrations of the International Day of Peace from 91 countries around the world in 2022.

=== 2023 – Actions for peace: Our ambition for the #Global-Goals ===
The 2023 theme for the International Day of Peace was "Action for peace: Our ambition for the #GlobalGoals".

==== 2023 global survey of celebration ====
A survey by the Culture of Peace News Network found internet reports concerning more than 942 celebrations of the International Day of Peace from 93 countries around the world in 2023.

=== 2024 – Cultivating a Culture of Peace ===
The 2024 theme for International Day of Peace was "Cultivating a Culture of Peace".

==== 2024 global survey of celebration ====
A survey by the Culture of Peace News Network found internet reports from 834 celebrations of the International Day of Peace from around the world in 2024 including many reports in Japanese, Hindi, Russian, Ukrainian and Arabic, as well as English, French, Spanish, Italian and Portuguese.

=== 2025 - Act Now for a Peaceful World ===
The 2025 theme for International Day of Peace is "Act Now for a Peaceful World.

=== 2026– Invest in Peace ===
The 2026 theme is "Invest in Peace - For Everyone, Everywhere, Every Day." It recognizes "everyday architects of peace" who are building a peaceful world through grassroots efforts.

==== 2026 global survey of celebration ====
This year's survey by the Culture of Peace News Network found internet reports from 821 celebrations of the International Day of Peace from around the world in 2026 including many reports in Japanese, Hindi, Russian, Ukrainian and Arabic, as well as English, French, Spanish, Italian and Portuguese.

== See also ==
- Allaman Castle, the Castle of Peace
- International Day of Non-Violence
- International Day of United Nations Peacekeepers
- International Human Rights Day
- International Decade for a Culture of Peace and Non-Violence for the Children of the World
- International Human Solidarity Day
- International Year for the Culture of Peace
- Peace education
- Peace movement
- Peace One Day
- Peace Parade UK
- School Day of Non-violence and Peace
- The Ribbon International
- World Day of Peace
- World Hello Day
- World Humanitarian Day
- World March for Peace and Nonviolence
- World peace
