= Culture of Peace News Network =

United Nations authorized interactive online network

The Culture of Peace News Network is a United Nations authorized interactive online network, committed to supporting the global movement for a culture of peace and nonviolence. The network commenced under the auspices of UNESCO, as part of the International Year for the Culture of Peace. The United Nations General Assembly in 2009 further endorsed the work of the network, in resolution A/RES/64/80.

== Growth ==
CPNN has grown in scope in recent years. As of 2023, the CPNN website is updated more or less daily (30-50 articles per month) with articles promoting at least one of the eight program areas of the culture of peace as defined in the United Nations Declaration and Programme of Action on a Culture of Peace: Education for Peace, Human Rights, Sustainable Development, Equality of Women, Democratic Participation, Free Flow of Information, Tolerance/Solidarity, Disarmament/Security. CPNN has English, French and Spanish/Portuguese sections. Articles in the French section or in the Spanish/Portuguese section are always paired with a translation in the English section so that all articles are available in English.

== Activities ==
Beginning in 2017 each year CPNN publishes a survey of the events celebrating the International Day of Peace. In 2022 it linked to over 846 events in 91 countries.

At the beginning of each month a bulletin, available on the CPNN website, summarizes the major developments for a culture of peace and is sent by email to mailing lists in English, French and Spanish.

CPNN is an all-volunteer initiative; additional reporters are encouraged.
