= International Year for the Culture of Peace =

United Nations observance

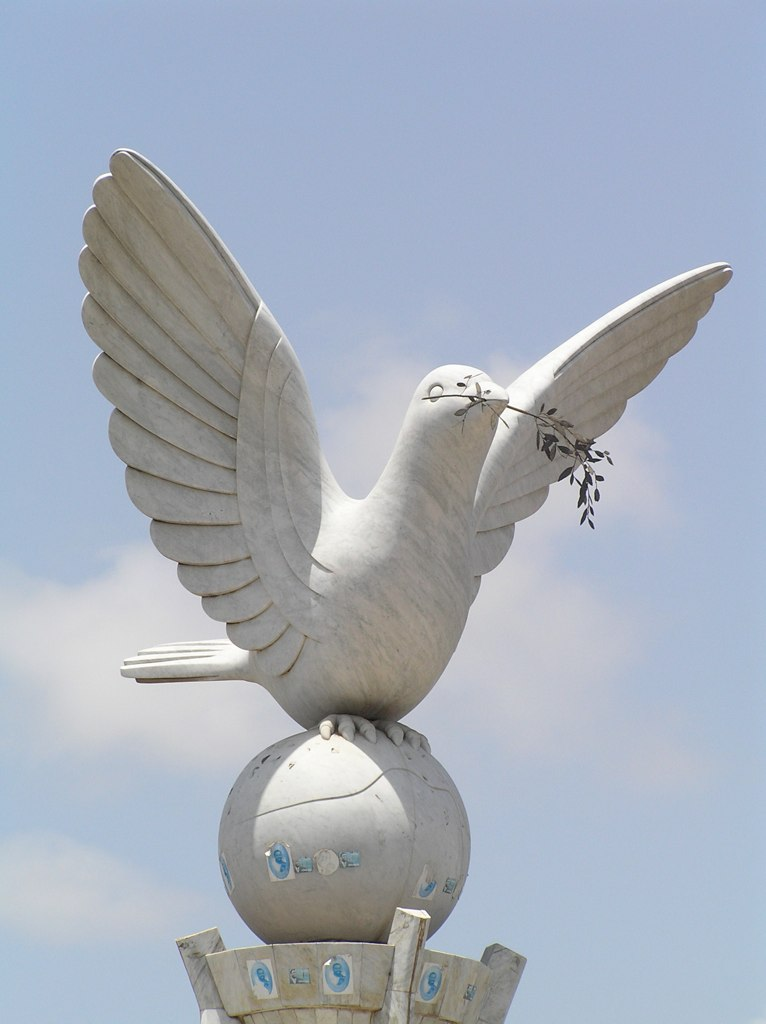
Peace dove statue in Lomé, Togo

The International Year for the Culture of Peace was designated by the United Nations as the year 2000, with the aim of celebrating and encouraging a culture of peace.

== Origins ==
Since 1959 the United Nations has designated specific years to emphasize issues which are part of the mission of the organization. The International Year for the Culture of Peace was proclaimed in a United Nations General Assembly resolution in 1997 on the basis of an Economic and Social Council resolution. The General Assembly invited a Declaration and Programme of Action from UNESCO and adopted it after ten months of difficult negotiation.

== The IYCP Taskforce ==
The lead organization for the International Year was UNESCO. There was a logic to this, in that UNESCO is the United Nations organization dealing with education, and also in that the constitutional mandate of UNESCO involves the encouragement of a global culture of peace. Within the UNESCO Secretariat in Paris, a specific International Year for the Culture of Peace Taskforce was established from 1998 to 2000, with the aim of co-ordinating the activities to publicize the International Year. Members of the Taskforce included: David Adams (chair), Enzo Fazzino, Katherine Stoessel, Di Bretherton, Zeynep Varoglu and Jan Visser.

== International Year Strategies and Results ==
The strategies behind the International Year centred upon involving civil society as much as possible. The specific initiatives included the collection of some 75 million signatures worldwide in support of a culture of peace, with the Manifesto 2000 Project. Another initiative was the Culture of Peace News Network, otherwise known as the CPNN, a web-based news service reporting news in support of a culture of peace.

An extensive description of the results obtained during the International Year was published by UNESCO.

== Assessment of the International Year ==
Opinion is divided as to how effective the International Year was. It is possible to argue that there was much rhetoric in the International Year, and yet often the impact of such events can only be discerned many years later.

== Ongoing Commitment of the United Nations ==
The work of supporting and encouraging a culture of peace continues through the International Decade for the Promotion of a Culture of Peace and Non-Violence for the Children of the World, and the ongoing Culture of Peace News Network.

== See also ==
- The Ribbon International
