= Mihir =

Mihir is a given name. Notable people with the given name include:

- Mihir Bose, British Indian journalist and author
- Mihir Das, Indian actor
- Mihir Desai, Indian human rights lawyer
- Mihir A. Desai, American economist
- Mihir Diwakar (born 1982), Indian cricketer
- Mihir Goswami, Indian politician
- Mihir Hirwani (born 1994), Indian cricketer
- Mihir Joshi (born 1981), Indian singer and television anchor
- Mihir Kanti Shome, Indian politician
- Mihir Mishra, Indian television actor
- Mihir Rakshit (born 1936), Indian economist
- Mihir Sen (1930–1997), Indian long distance swimmer
- Mihir Sengupta, Indian writer
- Mihir Shah, Indian economist
- Mihir Sharma, Indian economist

Mihir is also used as a title see Mihir (title)
