= João de Pina-Cabral =

Portuguese anthropologist (born 1954)

João de Pina-Cabral (born 1954 in Porto) is a Portuguese anthropologist and a senior researcher at the Instituto de Ciências Sociais of the University of Lisbon, where he was President of the Scientific Council (1997–2004). At present he is professor of social anthropology at the University of Kent.

== Academic life ==
Born in northern Portugal, Pina-Cabral was brought up in Portuguese Mozambique, and studied in South Africa (University of the Witwatersrand, Johannesburg). He achieved his doctorate in the University of Oxford in 1982, under the supervision of John Campbell and Rodney Needham, and his habilitation in the University of Lisbon in 2001.

Pina-Cabral has held academic posts in Portugal and the United Kingdom. He has been visiting professor at various universities in Brazil, Spain, Mozambique and Macau. He was co-founder of the Anthropology Departments at the Instituto Superior de Ciências do Trabalho e da Empresa (Lisbon) and at the Faculty of Sciences & Technology of the University of Coimbra; founding President of the Portuguese Association of Anthropology (1988–91); founding member, later Secretary (1994–96) and, later still, President of the European Association of Social Anthropology (2003–04); and he was founder and Rector of the Universidade Atlântica (1996–97). Pina-Cabral was Malinowski Memorial Lecturer at the London School of Economics and Political Science (UK), 1992; Distinguished Speaker at the Society for the Anthropology of Europe of the American Anthropological Association, 1992; Stirling Memorial Lecturer at the University of Kent (UK), 2003; Oração de Sapiência, University of Lisbon, 1999; and Inaugural Lecturer for the Program of Postgraduation in Social Anthropology, of the Universidade Estadual de Campinas, Brazil, 2006. Pina-Cabral is Honorary Fellow of the Royal Anthropological Institute of Great Britain and Ireland; Honorary Member of the European Association of Social Anthropologists and Correspondent Member of the Real Academia de Ciencias Morales y Politicas (Spain).

== Research interest ==
Pina-Cabral's thematic interests are: the relation between symbolic thought and social power; family and kinship in a comparative perspective; ethnicity in colonial and post-colonial contexts. His first work was a monograph on rural society in Minho (Portugal). He followed that with a comparative study of the family in Portugal and southern Europe and, later still, with a study of ethnicity in Macau during the period of transition from Portugal to Chinese rule. More recently he has written on Mozambique and the colonial transition and ethnicity and identity in Brazil.

== Monographs by João de Pina-Cabral ==
1. Sons of Adam, Daughters of Eve: the peasant worldview of the Alto Minho (Clarendon Press, Oxford, 1986; D. Quixote, Lisbon, 1989).
2. Os contextos da antropologia (Difel, Lisboa, 1991).
3. Aromas de Urze e de Lama (Fragmentos, Lisboa 1992; Imprensa de Ciencias Sociais, Lisboa 2008).
4. Em Terra de Tufões: Dinâmicas da Etnicidade Macaense, with N. Lourenço (ICM, Macau 1993; Chinese version 1995).
5. Between China and Europe: Person, Culture and Emotion in Macao (LSE Monographs in Social Anthropology, Berg, New York/Oxford 2002).
6. O homem na família (ICS, Lisboa, 2003).
