= Mihir Joshi =

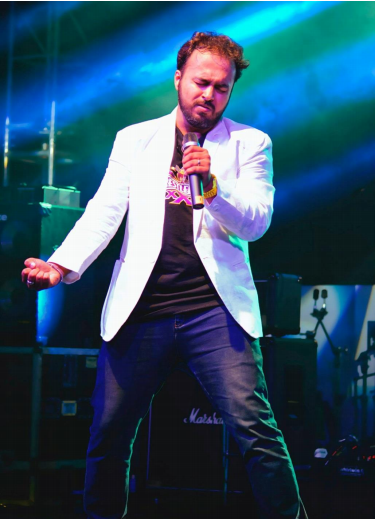
- Mihir Joshi performing during 'Mumbai Blues' album launch
- Born: March 15, 1981 (age 45); Mumbai, India, India.
- Other name: Music-Man Mihir
- Occupations: Television show host, radio jockey and singer
- Website: Official website

Mihir Joshi (born March 15, 1981) is an Indian singer, television anchor and former All India Radio FM Rainbow radio jockey.

== Early life ==
Joshi is an electronics engineer by training and studied at Fr. Conceicao Rodrigues College of Engineering.

== Professional life ==
Joshi started his career as a radio jockey with the stage-name Music-man Mihir. His first interview was with Engelbert Humperdinck. He worked Mumbai-based music store Furtados Music to help promote local bands and create a bridge between artists and instrument manufacturing companies. He also worked as a freelance writer and photographer for many magazines and newspapers such as (Rock Street Journal, Rave, Yuva, Jam, JLT, Hindustan Times, Mumbai Mirror and various others, including his own, called eMUSICPOST.com). After serving 5 years as a radio jockey on All India Radio, he moved to Radio One (India) to host One Mumbai One Music, a show dedicated to featuring Indian musicians on radio. The talk-show format of this radio show later grew into an independent show, The MJ Show.

== Music career ==
=== Performing artist ===
Mihir Joshi formed and fronted three English bands as the lead vocalist, The King Keys in 2006, The Works in 2007, and Mihir Joshi Band in 2012. He also formed his first Hindi band, Bombay Rock Project in 2011, that went on to perform and do quite well on season 3 of India's Got Talent. He also formed his new Bollywood Band in 2014.

=== Album ===
Mihir Joshi released his first album on May 31, 2014 – Mumbai Blues, produced by Ashish Manchanda, recorded at Ranjit Barot's Nirvana Studios and Ashish's Flying Carpet Productions. It was released worldwide digitally by Times Music and physically by Flying Carpet Productions. The album was launched by Ehsaan Noorani and Loy Mendonsa of the famous Shankar–Ehsaan–Loy music director trio on the Harman Live Arena stage at the Palm Expo in Mumbai.

In February 2015, Mihir's label Times Music was ordered by Central Board of Film Certification to remove the word Bombay from one of his songs, Sorry.

== Television Hosting ==
Joshi hosted two TV reality shows – ICICI Direct Aspire on Zee Business and Maruti Suzuki Colors Of Youth on MTV India.

=== The MJ Show ===
Joshi started The MJ Show as a blog in 2010, and later took it to a visual platform on YouTube with help from Ping Network in August 2013. Season 1 had 50 episodes and Season 2 is about to end with 25 episodes on the YouTube channel. The show is also broadcast by NDTV Prime.

=== WWE ===
Mihir is also a emcee and has hosted events for many companies for more than 11 years. He is also the official host for the world's largest sports entertainment brand – WWE – in India.

== Awards ==
=== Global Indian Music Awards ===
The Global Indian Music Academy Awards are presented annually by Global Indian Music Academy to honour and recognise Indian music. Joshi and his band, the Mihir Joshi Band won an award for their debut album Mumbai Blues .

Year	Nominee / work	Award	Result
2015	Mumbai Blues	Best Rock Album	Won
