= Nirvana Studios =

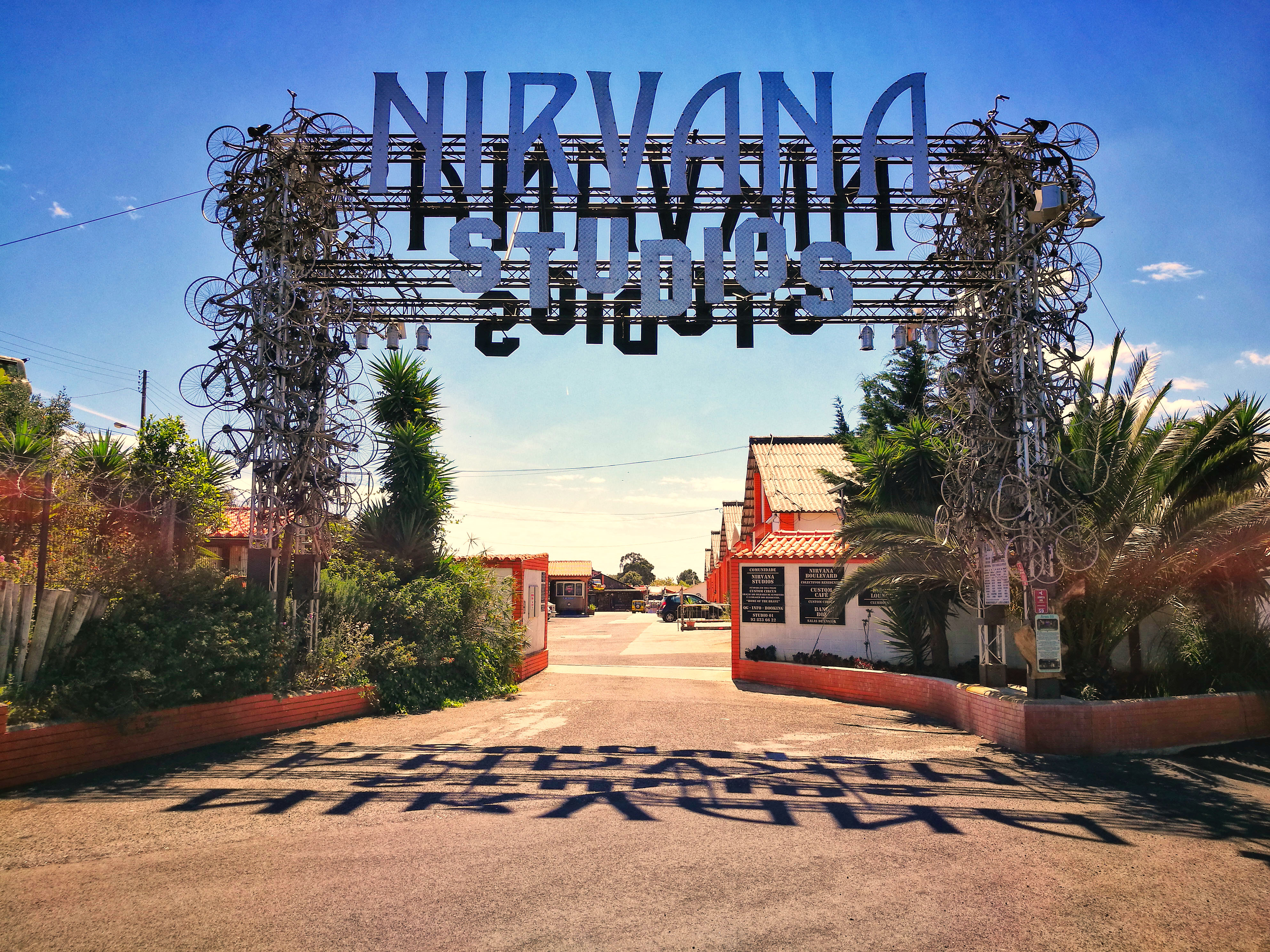
- Entrance of the alternative cultural center
- Alternative names: Alternative Cultural Center

General information
- Architectural style: Eco Architecture, upcycling with a post apocalyptic aesthetic
- Location: Oeiras, Portugal
- Owner: Custom Circus

Design and construction
- Designations: Cultural Center

Website
- www.nirvanastudios.com

Nirvana Studios, also known as the Alternative Cultural Center, is a cultural center in Portugal, housed in a former military arsenal from 1940 located in the town of Oeiras, ; it serves as a cultural hub in Barcarena (municipality of Oeiras). The center was founded by Daniela Sousa, Michel Alex, and Rui Gago, from the company Custom Circus (which manages the space), and operates 365 days a year, 24 hours a day. A hub for artistic projects by independent artists and subcultures.

An alternative cultural center, it houses dozens of resident collectives across three hectares of space and facilities dedicated to culture and the hosting of various events, featuring a range of multipurpose studios, workshops, rehearsal and recording rooms, both outdoor and indoor. The choice of the name Nirvana (unrelated to the American band of the same name) refers to its Buddhist meaning: a state of perfect happiness and peace.

This cultural center has its origins in Custom Circus, a troupe with a post-apocalyptic aesthetic, an organization that began staging shows in Portugal in the 1990s and later went on to work as a traveling theater company. After several years of investment, they sold about two dozen of their vehicles to raise capital and thus found the center, which began construction in 2003. Initially chosen as a parking lot for the vehicles and equipment they used in their shows, the site was dilapidated, lacking sanitation, water, or electricity. Even so, it was the site chosen to be restored and transformed into the company’s base. The facilities of the former barracks were restored and repurposed to house an artistic community. The space was restored in an eco-architectural upcycling style with a post-apocalyptic aesthetic. In addition to the restoration work, a wall of fame was erected for the artists who best embody the project and have passed through the facilities. A platform for temporary artist residencies was also created, along with a 360-degree conceptual theater dedicated to alternative aesthetics, such as rock cabaret, steampunk, industrial e fantasy. This was a project carried out over the years as the company secured funding; for example, one of the cultural center’s main buildings and stages, the Teatro Custom Café, was under construction for eight years and was only completed in 2012.

In addition to entertainment, the cultural center also offers facilities for hosting corporate events and other organizations, and serves as a hub for various creative sectors such as tattooing, surfboard and skateboard building, and the restoration of custom cars and motorcycles. In 2022, the center hosted more than 200 music bands, in addition to other artists in the fields of theater, dance, performance, film, and television, such as Aurea, Buraka Som Sistema or D’Zrt (resident band), as well as extreme sports and environmental movements, among others.

== History ==
=== Military origins and name ===
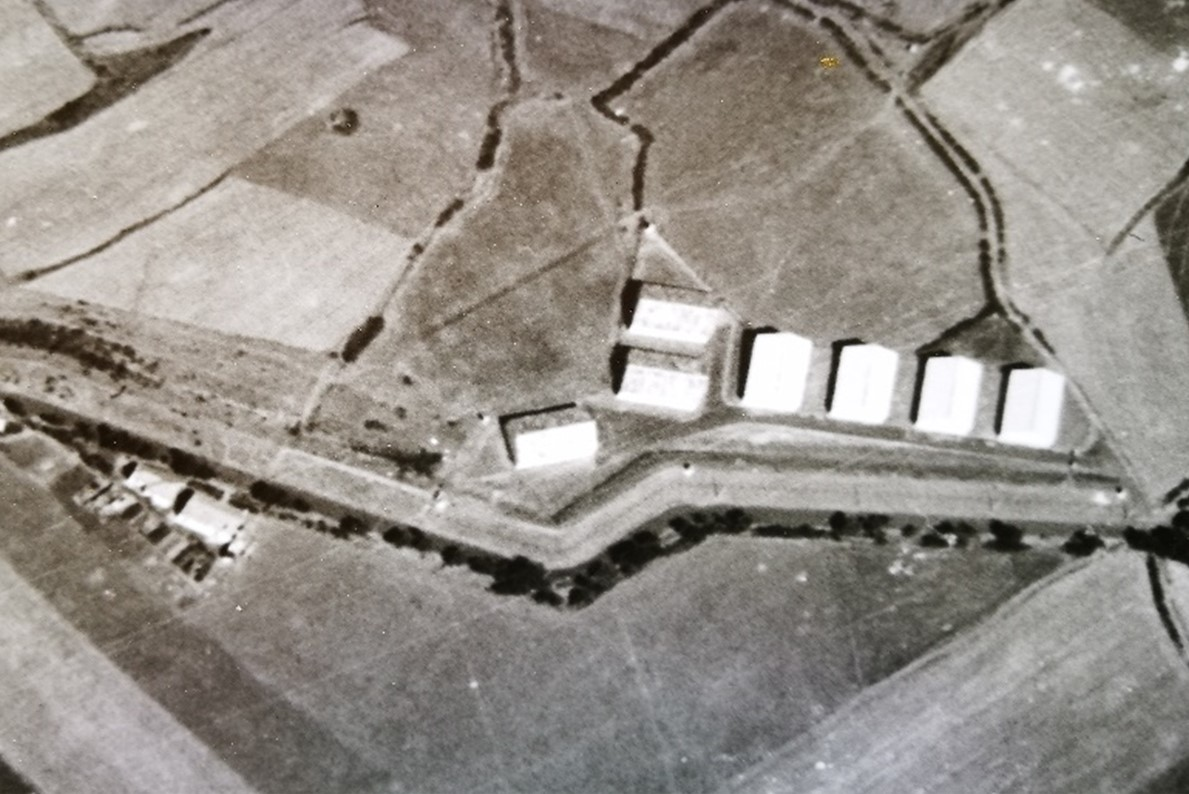
Aerial photograph of the barracks in 1958

To protect the Portuguese capital from invasions, whether by land or sea, a series of fortifications and military installations were built between the late 19th and early 20th centuries, which would come to be known collectively as "Lisbon Entrenchment Field". Several of these fortifications and installations were connected by a road, inaugurated in 1902, which was initially reserved solely for military traffic; this road would become known as the Estrada Militar (Military Road) de Circunvalação. On this road, near Barcarena, a military barracks was built during the Estado Novo, dating from the World War II; period; the barracks served as an armory for the Military Road and the Braço de Prata arms factory in Lisbon.

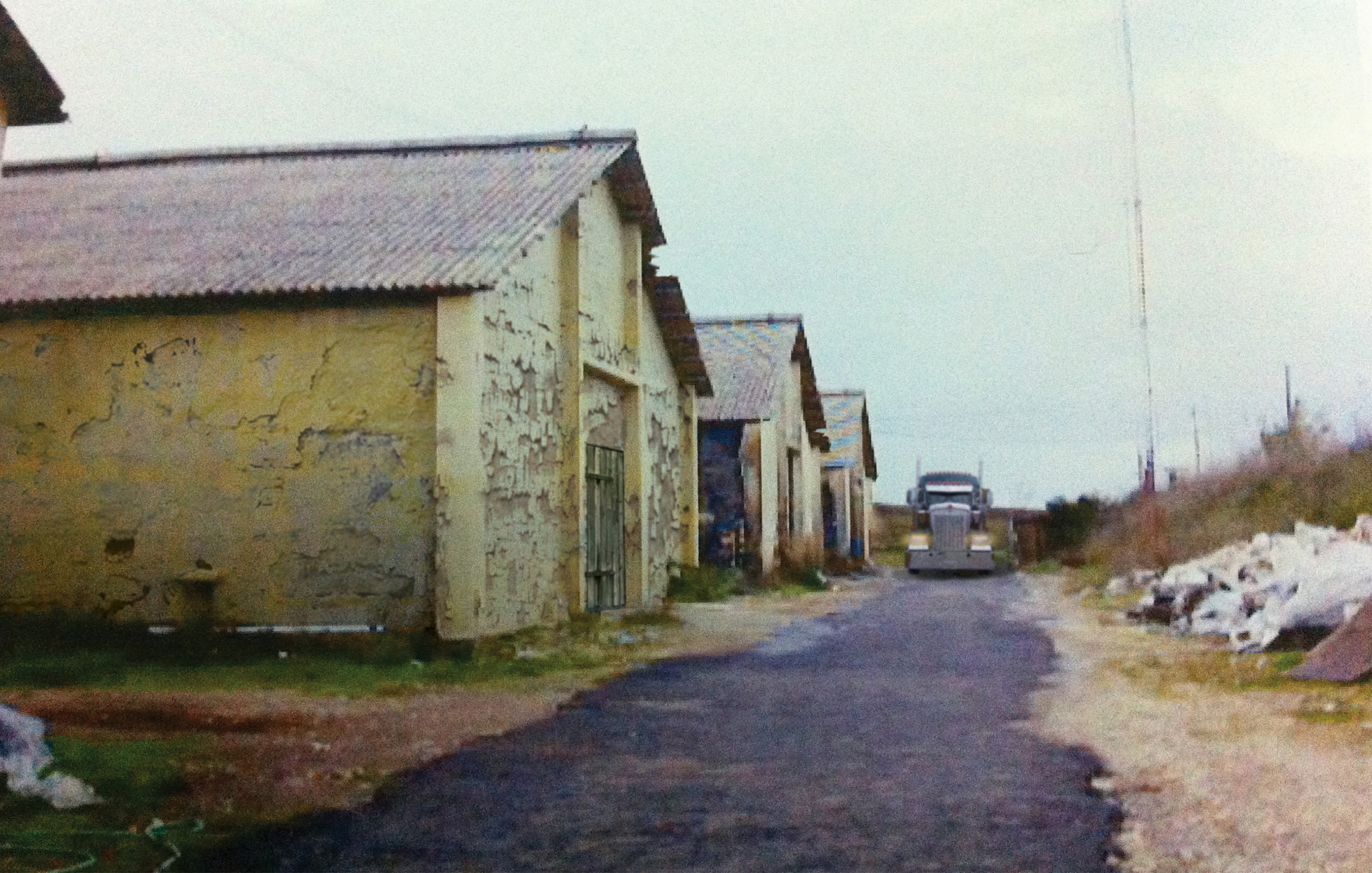
Arrival of Custom Circus at the former barracks in December 2003

Until 1984, the barracks also served as a logistics base for the Army, supporting military convoys traveling along the Military Road carrying bombs and ammunition. After being sold by the Portuguese government to a construction consortium, the barracks began a process of deterioration that lasted 19 years. In 2003, the dilapidated barracks were purchased again, this time by the transdisciplinary theater and visual arts company Custom Circus, using self-financing. Initially chosen as a parking lot for their vehicles and other materials used in their performances, the complex was in a state of disrepair, lacking sanitation, water, or electricity. Nevertheless, it was the site chosen for restoration and thus became the company’s base. After several years of investment, they sold about 20 of their vehicles to raise capital to purchase this 3-hectare property in Barcarena; thus, Daniela Sousa, Michel Alex, Rui Gago, and Custom Circus founded Nirvana Studios. In addition to its name, the project was also designated as the Alternative Cultural Center, establishing itself as a cultural hub in Barcarena.

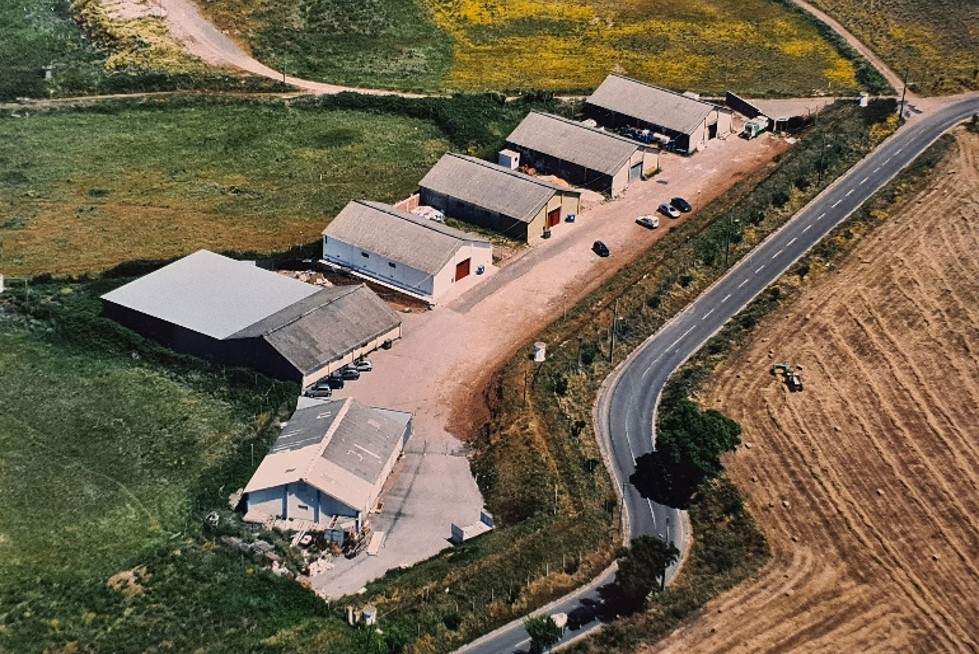
Aerial view of the former barracks in 2005, already in the hands of Nirvana Studios; the main road running through the site had already been cleared of debris

The name, Nirvana, was the result of a consensus among the group’s members on the idea of creating “a safe haven, both physical and psychological, objective and subjective”—a word synonymous with peace, balance, and wisdom. There is no connection between the name of the cultural center and the American band of the same name. The space, flanked by the historic Military Road, was already listed in the municipal archives as house number 66, which led Custom Circus to make the connection with the famous American Route 66.

=== Renovation ===
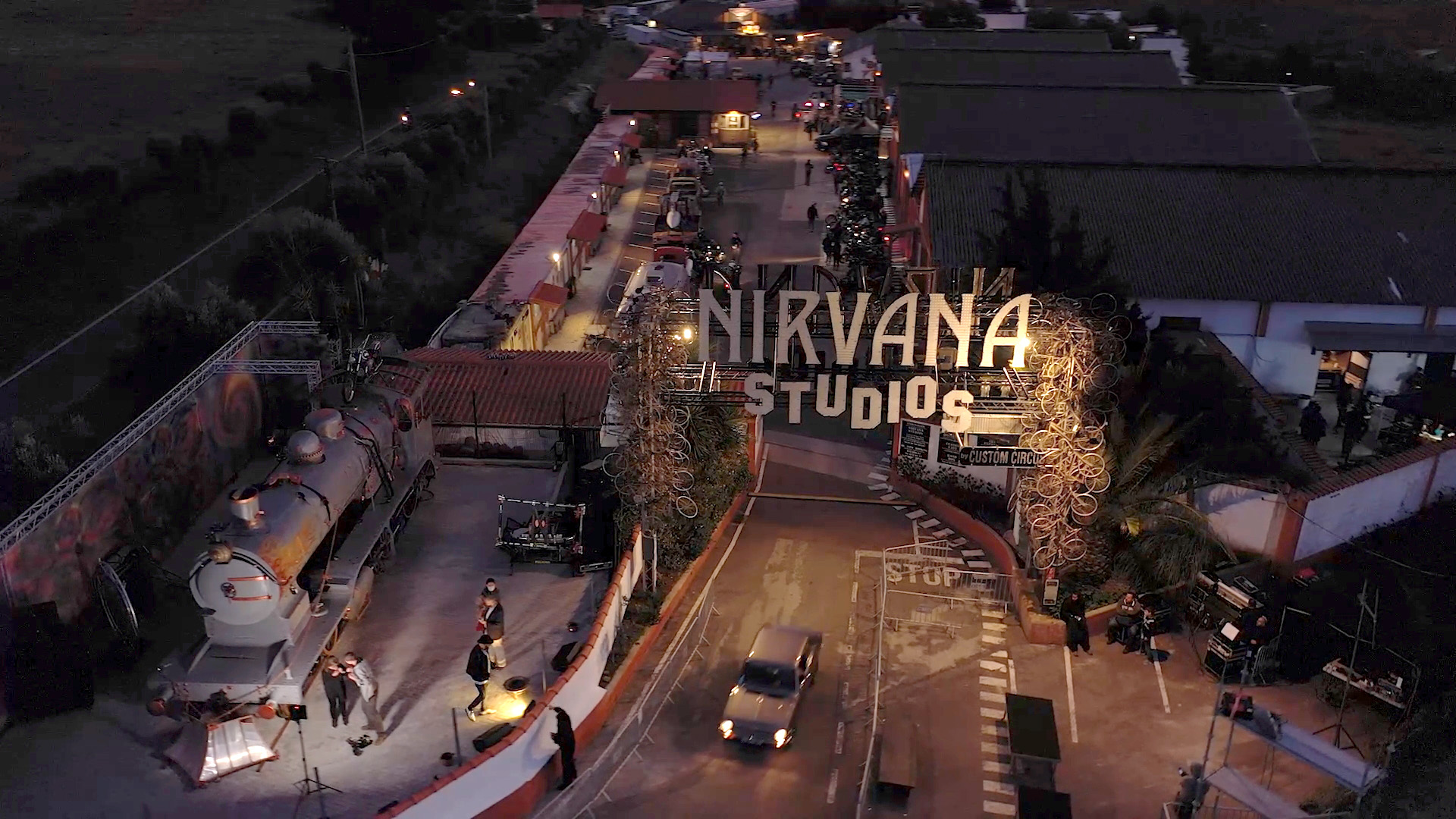
Aerial photograph of Nirvana Studios in 2023

Starting from the ruins of the 1940s barracks, Custom Circus carried out its reconstruction while preserving and restoring various aspects of the property’s military past. An avenue, Nirvana Boulevard, was built through the complex, three times wider than the original road of the old barracks, becoming a sort of backbone along which one can traverse the center of the complex. Initially, during the cleanup and rehabilitation of this thoroughfare, tons of debris accumulated since 1984 were removed, as well as a series of metal structures at risk of collapse, including a telecommunications antenna. It is on this avenue that most of the studios are located. The first performance structure used by Custom Circus was an old circus tent, refurbished to accommodate part of the audience; however, due to a storm early on, this idea was abandoned. In short, all the barracks’ roofs were in poor condition.

An effort was then undertaken to rehabilitate and restore the armories and hangars, with the aim of repurposing them for the arts. Although the barracks were closed about a decade after the fall of the Estado Novo, the restoration of the buildings followed the aesthetic frameworks of the 1940s and 1950s. Over the years, features were added to the space that follow a line of influences which, according to the founders, “ranges from the imagination of Jules Verne to the post-apocalyptic themes of films such as "Mad Max". Over time, the complex has become a cultural center featuring art galleries, a theater, a café, various rehearsal rooms and studios, a community area for international students, and artist housing, among other amenities.

== Custom Circus ==
The Custom Circus is a portuguese transdisciplinary theater and visual arts company, officially founded in 2002. Established as a non-profit cultural association, it works in the fields of theater, audiovisual productions, cultural events, research and artistic training—areas in which it creates, directs, and produces cultural initiatives in the fields of the arts, cinema, theater, television and advertising.

Initially, the members traveled in a caravan/traveling theater, consisting of classic vehicles or those modified in a post-apocalyptic style, which gradually expanded. While maintaining a nomadic spirit in the early years, they later settled in Oeiras, Portugal, and founded the alternative cultural center Nirvana Studios. The company’s activities began in 1992 and, with the exception of 1995, it held various events every year until its official founding in 2002 under the name Custom Circus. According to João Mendes Rosa, Head of the Oeiras Culture and Arts Division in 2021, this company was one of the main drivers in raising Oeiras’s profile both nationally and internationally through the promotion of culture.

With its headquarters located at Nirvana Studios, between 2004 and 2019 alone, Custom Circus staged around 600 shows, while also hosting and supporting dozens of transdisciplinary events annually—ranging from art to sports—and has already produced 15 interactive theater productions, 10 albums, dozens of visual art exhibitions and installations, 10 literary publications, and other projects. Custom Circus is responsible for all artistic and cultural programming at Nirvana Studios.

== Facilities, projects, and recognition ==
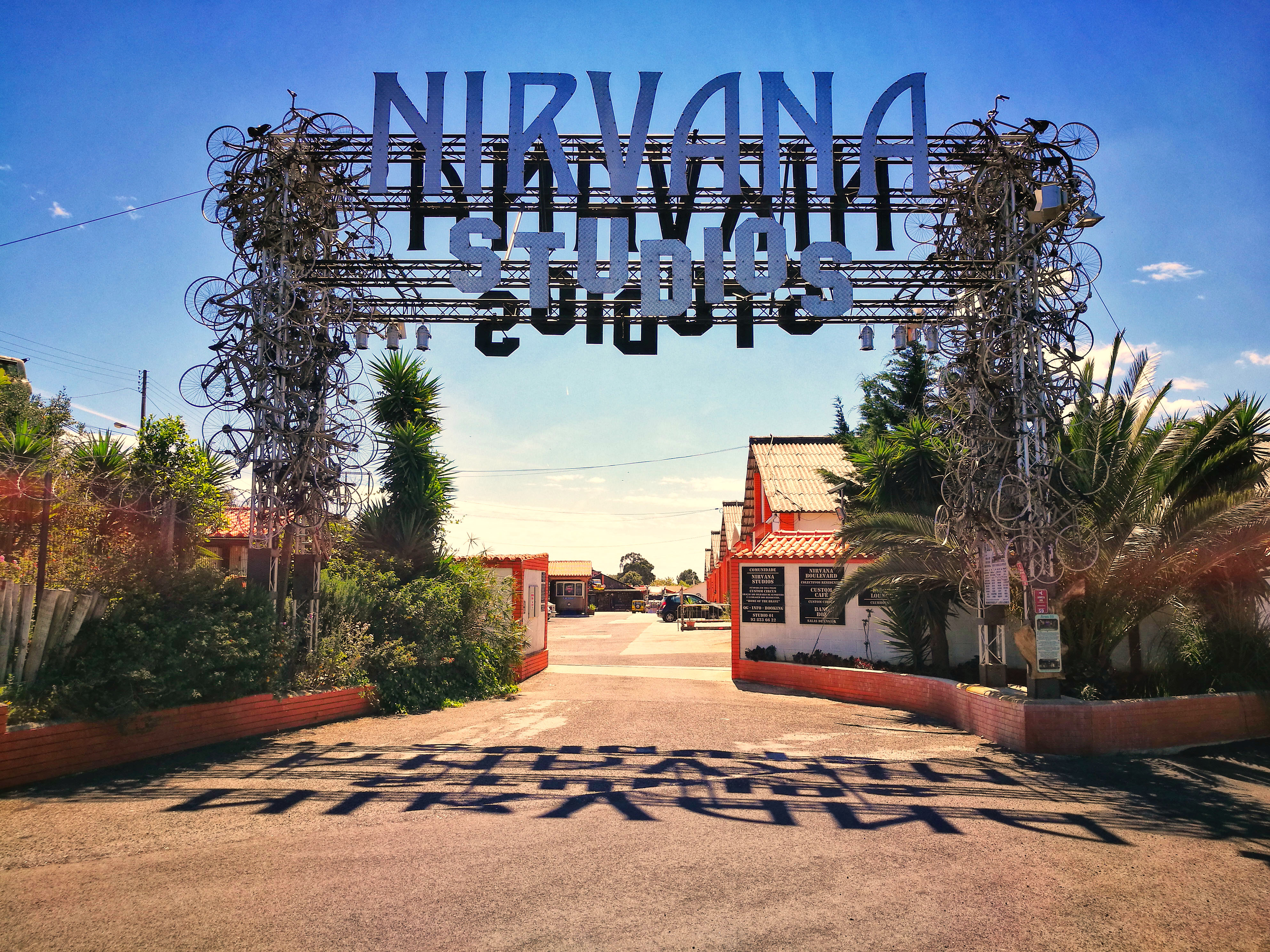
Raus Human Portico, bearing the cultural center’s name and decorated with donated bicycles

=== Raus Human Portico and Nirvana Boulevard ===
The entrance to Nirvana Studios is marked by a tribute to the community’s residents and its audience. To this end, a portico-shaped, structure was built, artistically composed of a set of bicycles with stage structures, which became known as the Raus Human Portico. Constructed in separate parts inside the STRANGE Gallery, it was transported along the main avenue and assembled at the complex’s entrance using a crane. All the bicycles were collected, totaling more than two hundred, and only those in an advanced state of deterioration were used in the portico, with the remainder donated to various institutions and clubs.

The main thoroughfare of Nirvana Studios is Nirvana Boulevard, an avenue that runs through the complex from one end to the other, tserving as a sort of backbone along which one can traverse the center of the complex. This small road, dating from the military barracks era, was widened upon the Custom Circus’s arrival at the complex so that the group could park their convoy of vehicles, some of which were quite large. In the early days, it was necessary to remove hundreds of tons of debris that had accumulated since 1984 and to dismantle a series of metal structures at risk of collapse.

=== Custom Café Theater ===
The Custom Café Theater is a performance venue located in the former main armory building. Construction began in 2004, requiring extensive restoration of the building’s structure; this, combined with the management’s financial difficulties and the performance schedule, caused the reconstruction to take eight years.

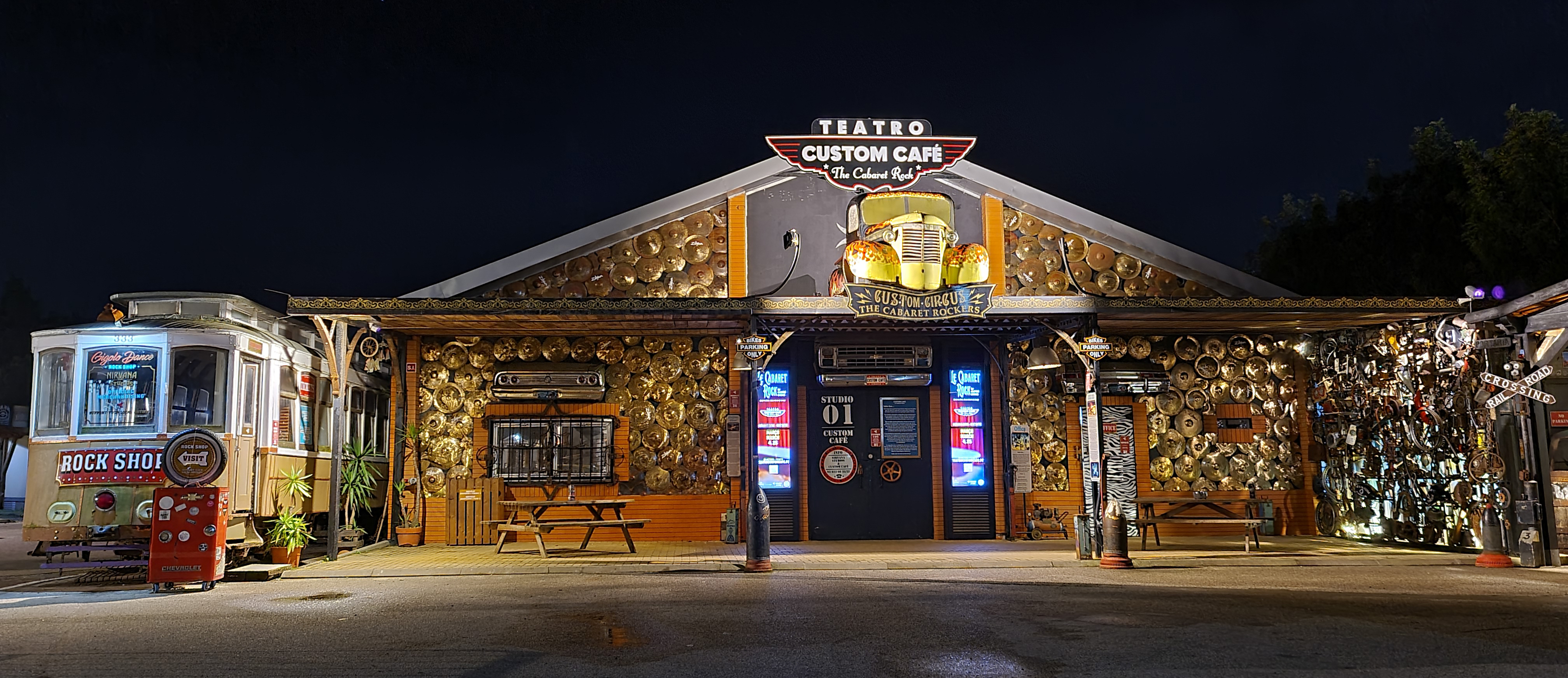
Facade of the Custom Café Theater, December 2022

During the first phase of the building’s reconstruction, several bombs dating from World War II were discovered during necessary excavation work; some of them, after being analyzed and defused by the Portuguese Army, are now on display inside the auditorium. From the outset, this venue faced repeated setbacks, due both to a lack of financial support and uncertainty regarding the viability of a performance hall of this nature outside the Portuguese capital. Nevertheless, the venue opened in March 2012 with a theatrical production that drew over 40,000 spectators over the following two years. Over the years, several boxes from the 1940s and 1950s were found containing military equipment, such as torpedoes, grenades, uniforms and documents. Due to the complex’s industrial-archaeological character, an electric (formerly No. 333 of Carris de Lisboa, in service between 1903 and 1996) was placed thereto serve as a box office and shop.

The official opening of this theater took place on May 20, 2026, during an official visit by the Minister of Culture, Margarida Balseiro Lopes, to mark the celebration of Custom Circus’s 30-year global career. The visit was also attended by delegations from three departments of he Oeiras City Council, Culture, Tourism and Heritage; including Armando Soares, Susana Duarte, and Mariana Coelho, as well as the three founders of Nirvana Studios: Daniela Sousa, Michel Alex, and Rui Gago.

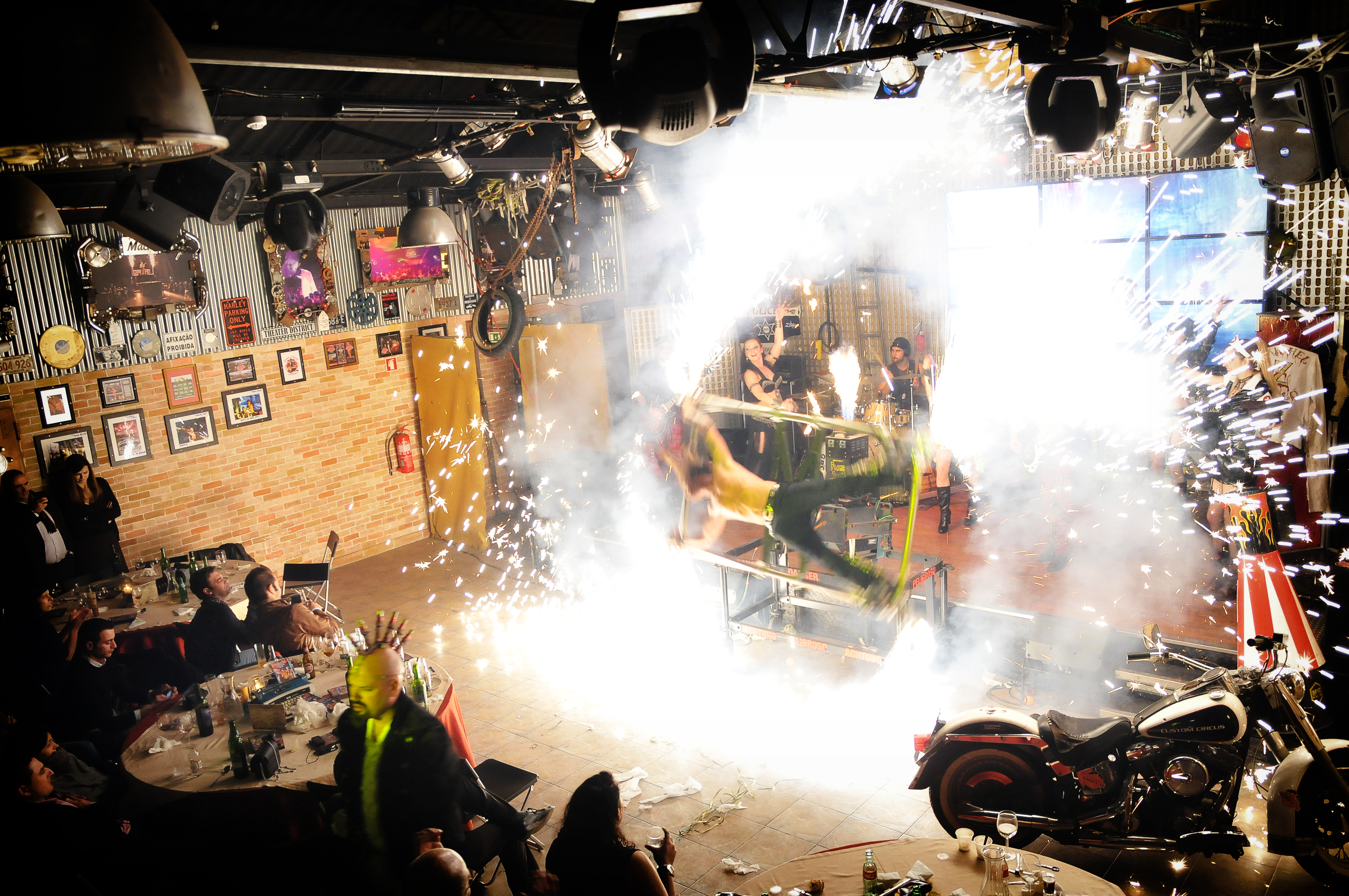
Interior of the Custom Café Theater during a performance

The multipurpose space serves as a venue for transdisciplinary performances. With no fixed seating or fixed viewing angles, the theater’s “ ” configuration allows Custom Circus to enter the stage with various vehicles and machinery. This makes it possible to hold events and projects such as catwalks, castings, art Galleries, film shoots,conferences, and launches, among others, in the same space. A bar vehicle, a 1970 Ford ice cream truck, was installed inside the building; it was imported from the United States due to a Levi Strausstour. In the room, which has four pillars, these were four repurposed Lisbon street lamps that had been installed in the area where Expo98 took place; the room’s walls, meanwhile, are decorated with mementos from the downtown arts community. The building’s façade is decorated with hundreds of cymbals damaged by the drummers of Custom Circus; however, this work was carried out with the support of the brands Zildjian and the company Roadcrew. On the porch stands a 1939 Chevrolet van.

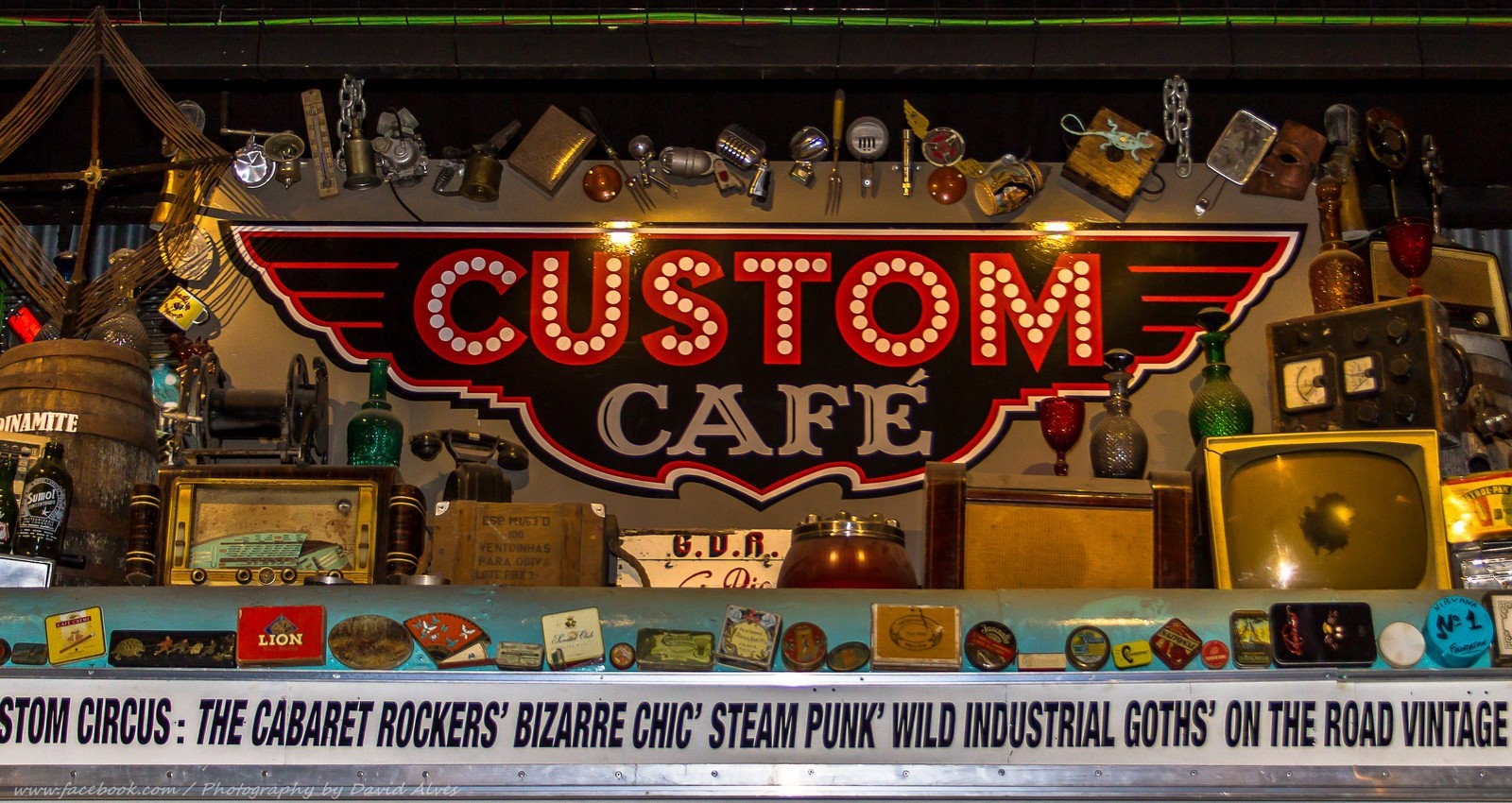
Detail of one of the walls of the Custom Café Theater

Since its opening, the theater has hosted over a thousand performances by Custom Circus and hundreds of other events, and is licensed by the Oeiras City Council as a transdisciplinary theater. Among the major theatrical productions staged by Custom Circus in this space, the following stand out: "Le Cabaret Rock" (2012–2013), "Bizarre Chic" (2014), "A Viagem" (2015–2017), "Absurdium" (2017–2019), "Going Crazy" (2021-2022), and "Le Cabaret Rock - Reloaded" (since 2022). However, several other artists and programs have used the space, such asda TVI,“Conta-me” and "Goucha" performances by artists likeAnselmo Ralph, Ana Malhoa or Blasted Mechanism, a feature film shoot titled "Quatro Mulheres ao pé da Água",directed by Carla Clemente, and is also used as an immersive art space with exhibitions featuring various artists, such as Van Gogh or Fernando Pessoa.

=== Diner ===
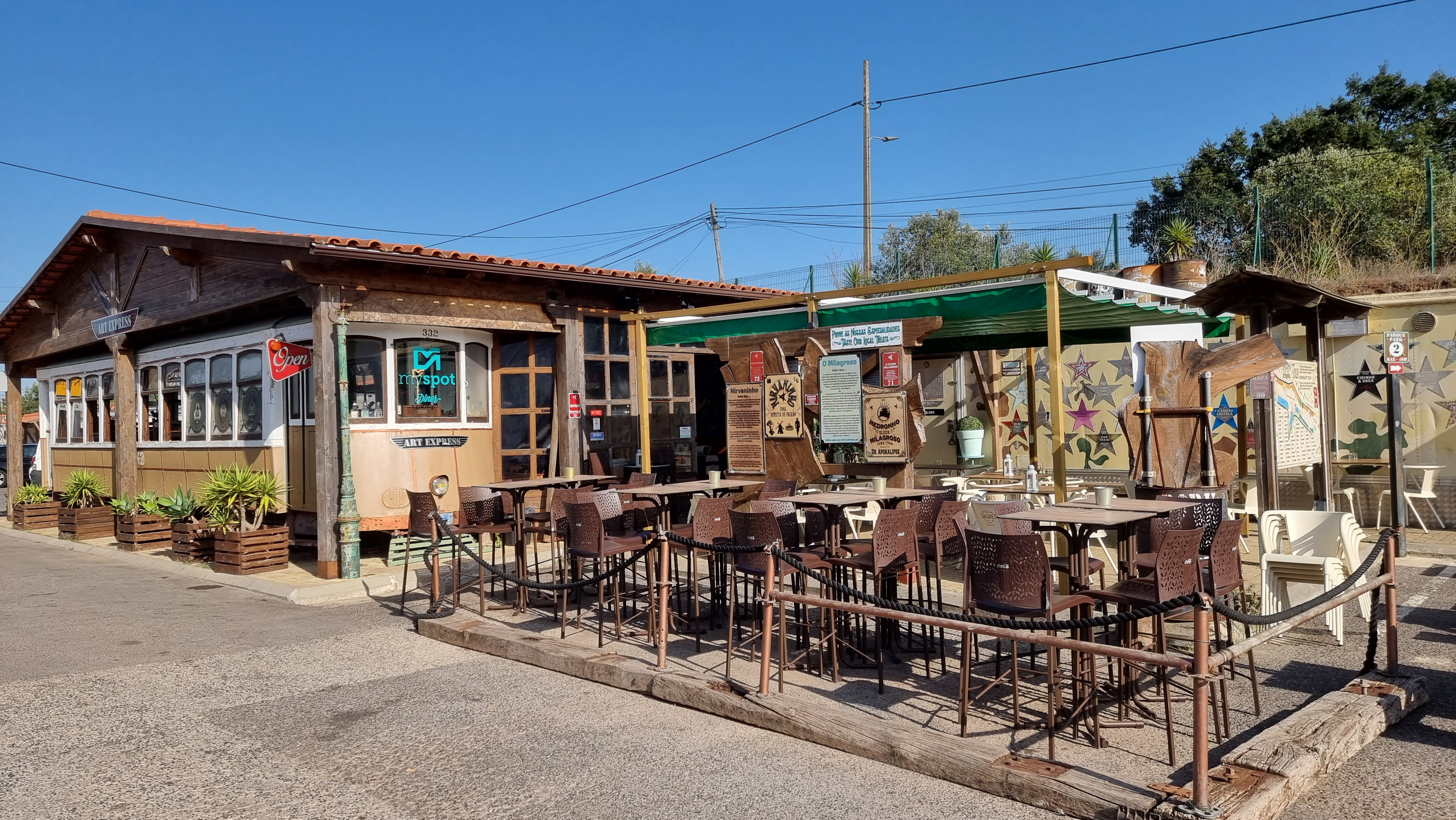
Exterior of the Diner; incorporated into the building is one of the restored trams

The Diner emerged from Custom Circus’s idea to create a bohemian stage within a vintage space featuring dining, live music, and other forms of artistic and cultural presentation. Initially, the group intended to use a vehicle as the centerpiece, and they considered using an Airstream; trailer; however, instead, they chose to integrate an old tram that was in an advanced state of disrepair into the space. In 2013, thanks to an agreement with the Oeiras City Council, this industrial-era tram became part of the Diner.

The project involving the streetcar was fully funded by Custom Circus, covering everything from the vehicle’s transport to its restoration and the construction of the platform on which it rests. The streetcar, a 1903 J. C. Brills model built in the United States, weighs 17 tons and was operated in Portugal under the number 332 for 90 years, from 1906 to 1996. In 1901, the first tram line was inaugurated; the horse-drawn tramways in operation since 1872 began to be replaced, a process that was still underway in 1905, when the tram on display at the Diner was transported across the Atlantic Ocean on a cargo ship; during this sea voyage, another tram, the future No. 333, was also transported, and it too found a new home at Nirvana Studios, serving as a ticket office and showroom for merchandise for sale inside the Custom Café Theater.

=== Band Boxes ===
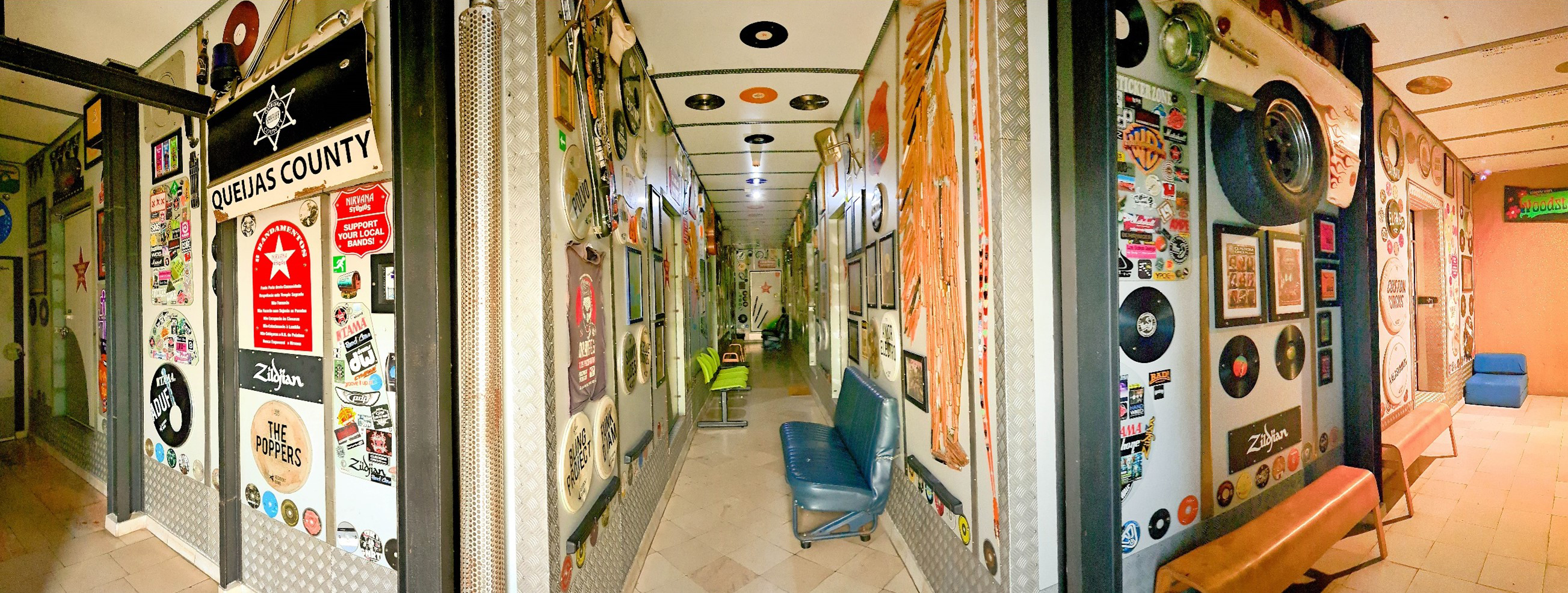
Some corridors of the Band Boxes

Nirvana Studios features 99 rehearsal rooms and approximately 400 resident projects, forming the most active community of musicians in Portugal since 2008. The term "Band Box" was registered as a trademark in 2004, the year in which an architectural upcycling process began that took three years of attempts, tests, and different approaches. In 2007, the band Easyway was the first band to receive a Band Box, No. 1 on Nirvana Boulevard. Over time, the idea spread, and band after band, Band Boxes were increasingly sought after for musical artistic projects. s hosted over a thousand projects in its rehearsal rooms Every year, a Band Box is awarded to the winning band of the Oeiras Band Sessions contest, which takes place at Nirvana Studios.

=== STRANGE Gallery ===
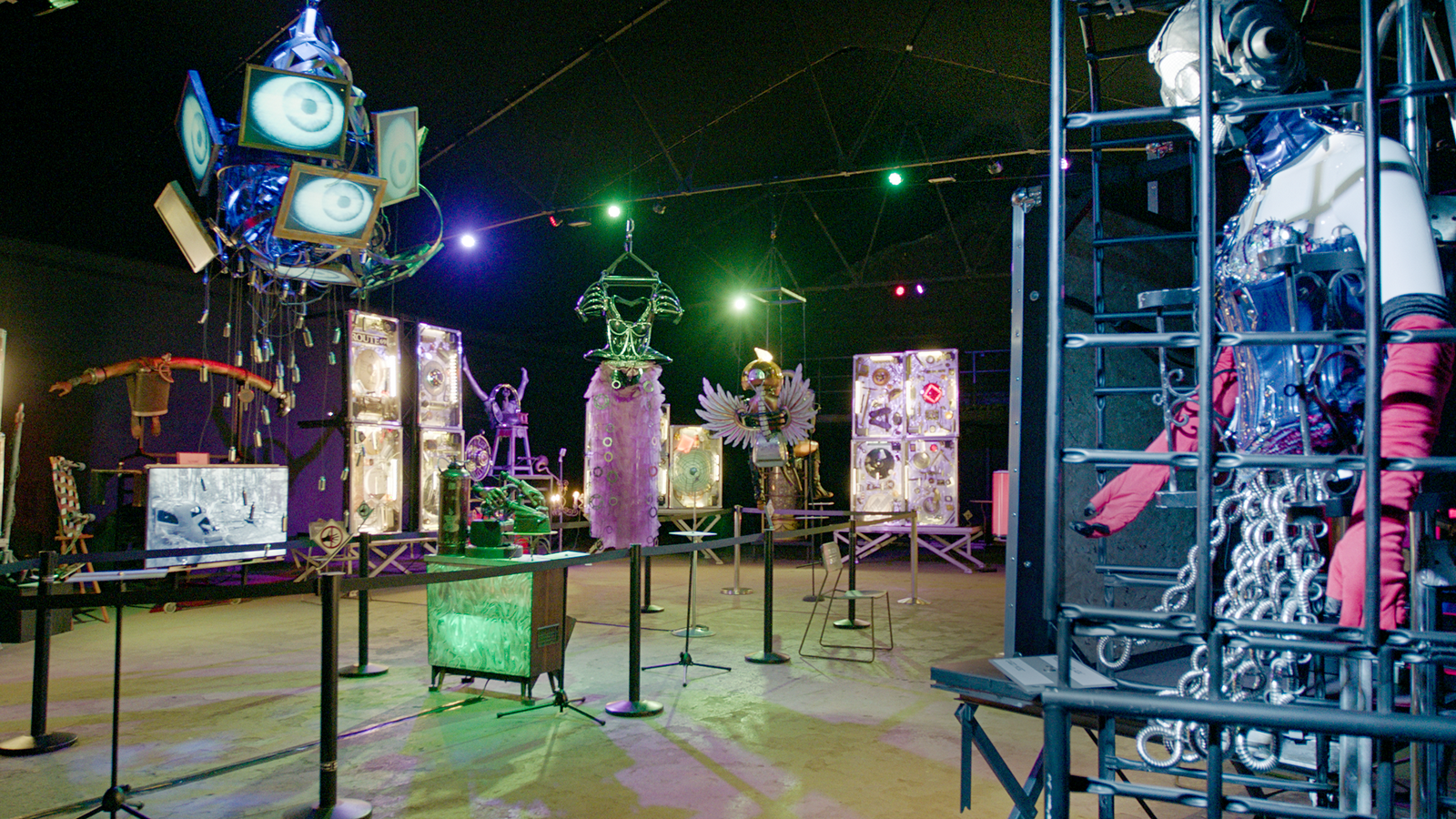
Interior of a section of the STRANGE Gallery, featuring the Limbus Infinitus exhibition by Custom Circus

STRANGE Gallery (an acronym for Reactive Transdisciplinary Synergies, Naked Arts, and Experimental Gallery) is a multidisciplinary and experimental gallery where artists can perform, exhibit, and experiment in this multipurpose open space. Located in the former heavy artillery depot, this structure served as Custom Circus’s first indoor performance space within Nirvana Studios between 2004 and 2008. Several of these performances took place simultaneously on the Boulevard and inside the depot, with the audience also moving between the spaces. Between performances, set designs and exhibitions, visual artworks, collections, and conceptual events by other artists and producers were presented.

In 2009, this warehouse was converted into the “Big Box” project to accommodate artists with large and/or complex structures. From this “strange” phenomenon of constant occupation of the space, its name, “Strange,” was coined in 2012. Over time, its use as a set for feature films events by other artists and producers were presented.

=== Custom Ville ===
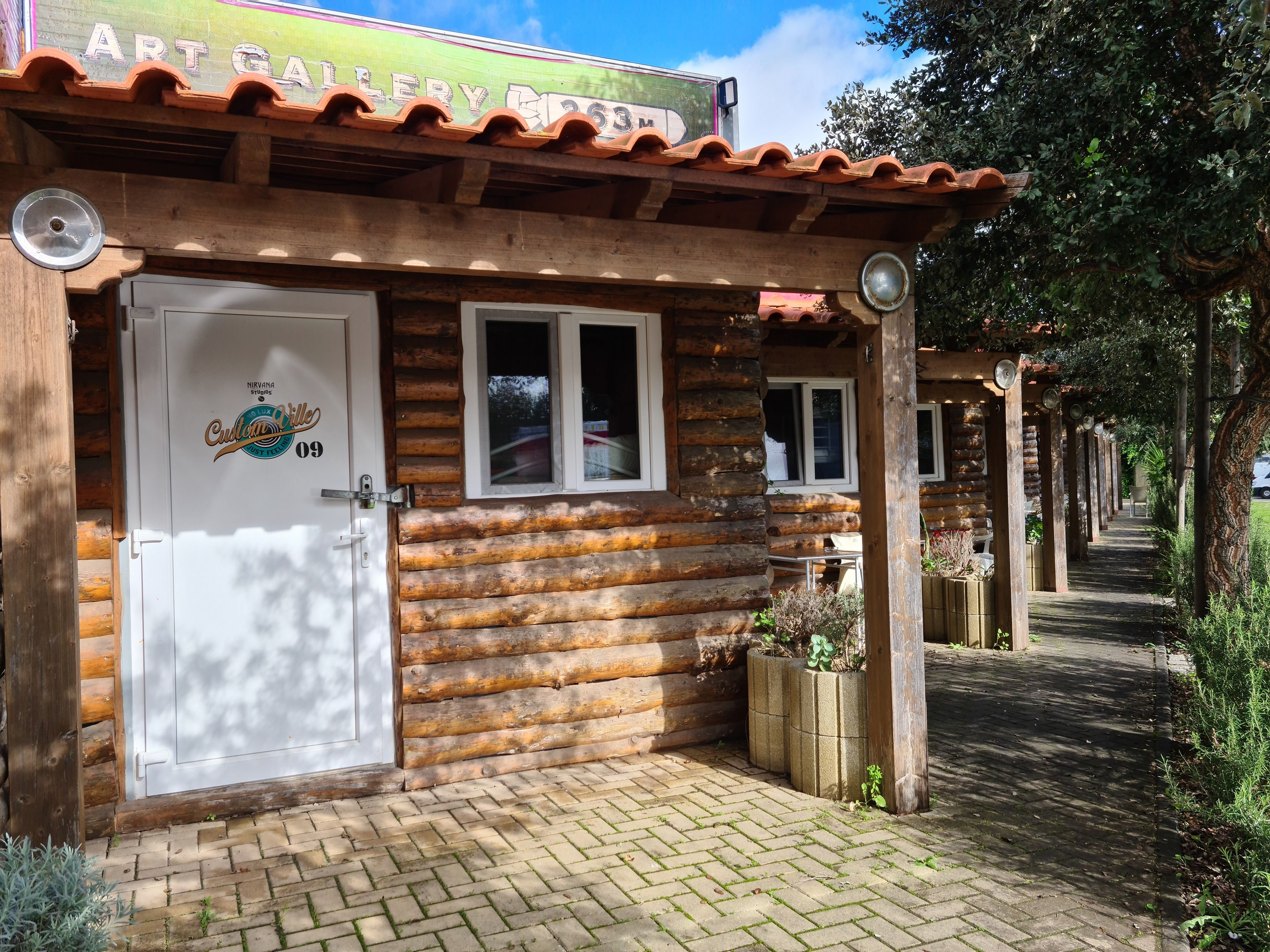
Custom Ville Bungalows

Established in 2016, Custom Ville is an artist residency project consisting of a series of bungalows in the residential area of Nirvana Studios. Due to the large number of artistic productions within the complex, there was a need to create a residential area. The architectural framework was created using military shipping containers; the outdoor areas feature small landscaped “islands” surrounded by natural elements, Nordic pine wood, and recycled and repurposed furniture, small vegetable gardens, pedestrian and communal zones, and event spaces; the bungalows are equipped with a kitchen and bathroom.

In addition to serving as housing for artists, an agreement was signed in 2016 with the Oeiras City Council and Faculdade Atlântica to extend the use of these residences to Portuguese and international students. In 2021, the Erasmus platform was integrated into the Custom Ville spaces through a partnership between Nirvana Studios, the Municipality of Oeiras, Kasapt, Mobilité Internationale, and Maisons d'Europe, thus giving rise to the "Erasmus Hub" project. This project also required its own building, which is why a structure exclusively dedicated to Erasmus was created to accommodate the various Erasmus groups.

=== UR Project ===
The UR Project began in 2010 to house support bases for semi-professional groups and professional organizations in active tourism, adventure, and outdoor sports. A series of sporting events take place within Nirvana Studios, notably mountain biking and trail running competitions. Developed on the opposite side of the Custom Ville perimeter, the UR hubs were designed as small open-space islands featuring eco-architecture. With the aim of diversifying and sharing ideas and concepts, the UR Project also incorporated several workshops for artisans whose work focuses on the reuse of obsolete materials and parts.

In 2022, Custom Circus merged the concepts of Custom Ville with those of the UR Project, a move that allowed the entire complex to be integrated into the Erasmus Hub. —the project’s name, UR—derives from the ancient Mesopotamian city and the first letters of the terms Upcycling-Recycling.

==== Check Point ====
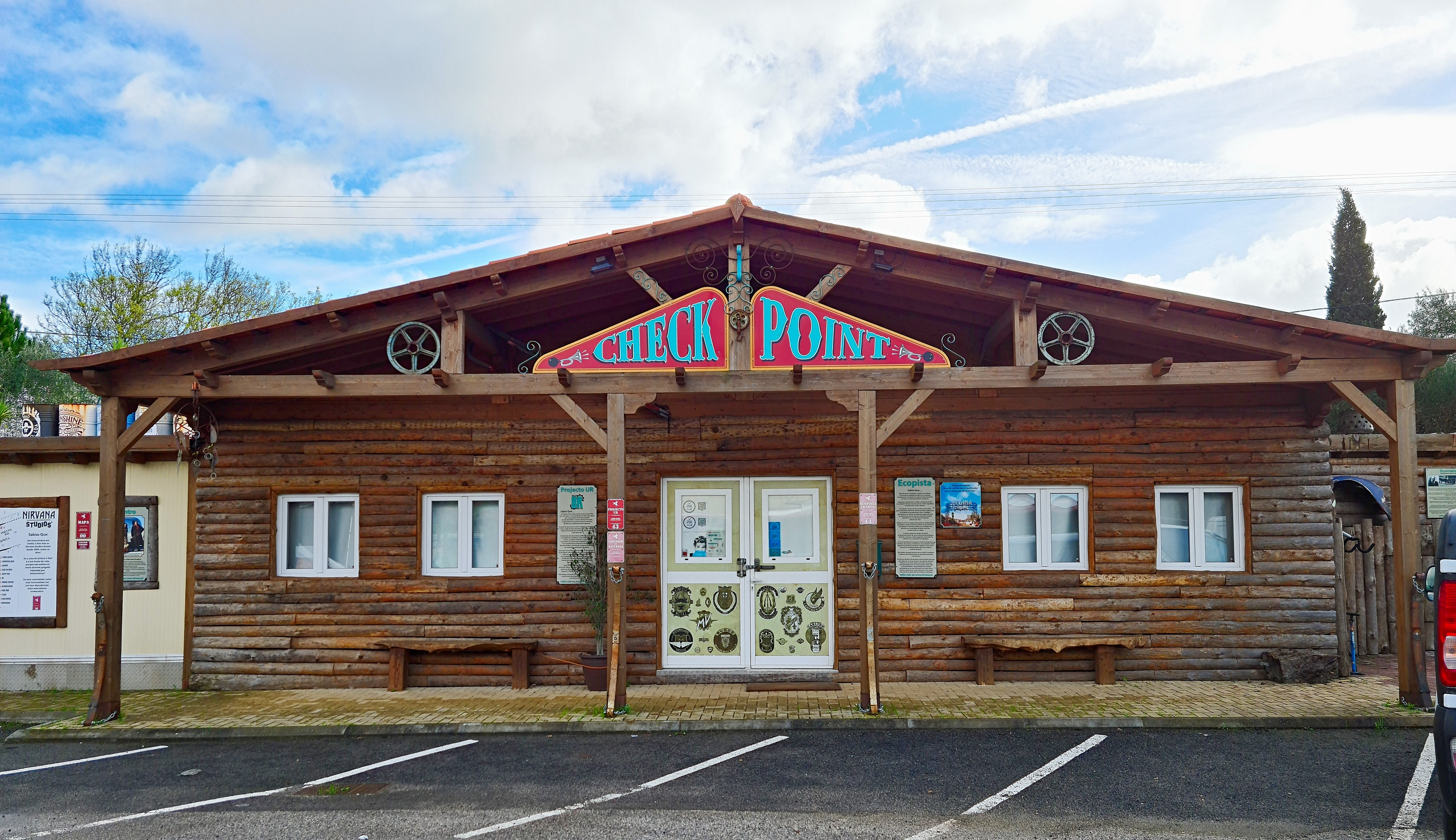
Check Point, in January 2022

Check Point was the first open space on the Projecto UR platform. Its construction involved four shipping containers, natural wood, and panels made from recycled fibers, adhering to Projecto UR’s eco-architectural approach by reusing materials and structures considered obsolete, such as the original doors of the old containers or the building’s ceiling insulation, made from cork stoppers (over 50,000) and repurposed wooden crates. This space is also the starting point for the Ecopista-Ciclovia, which begins at Nirvana Studios, and its porch features a range of stands and tools for bicycle maintenance and a fountain with drinking water.

==== Ecopista e ciclovia ====
An eco-trail and bike path begin at Nirvana Studios, resulting from a partnership between Custom Circus and the Oeiras Cycling School, an institution that regularly maintains and adapts the eco-trail according to scheduled events.

=== Wall of Fame ===
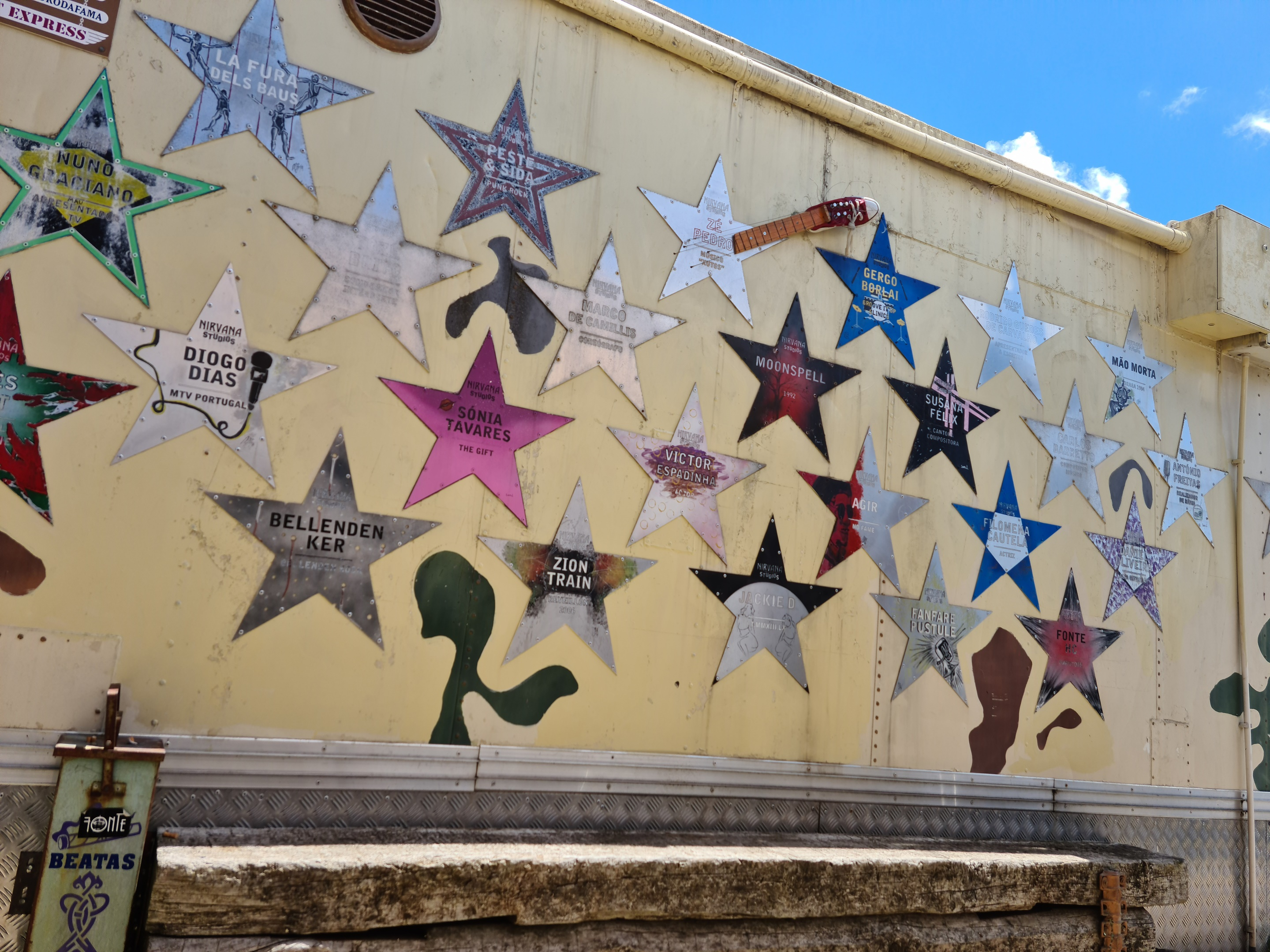
Stars on the Wall of Fame

The Wall of Fame is a wall that serves as a gallery of stars highlighting figures from the artistic and cultural scene who, directly or indirectly, participated in and/or contributed to the establishment of Nirvana Studios. Created in 2008, when Custom Circus realized the number of people who had contributed to the complex and its name, the Wall of Fame has grown in size over the years, featuring stars of artists such as Rui Veloso and Tozé Brito.

=== Steam Locomotive ===
Installed next to the entrance to Nirvana Studios is a 100-ton, coal-fired Borsig steam locomotive from 1903, formerly CP Locomotive 238,which operated until 1960. This structure, inaugurated on October 3, 2020, as an art project, was created by Custom Circus in partnership with the Portuguese National Railway Museum Foundation, the Entroncamento City Council, the Oeiras City Council, Comboios de Portugal, Infraestruturas de Portugal, and other institutions.

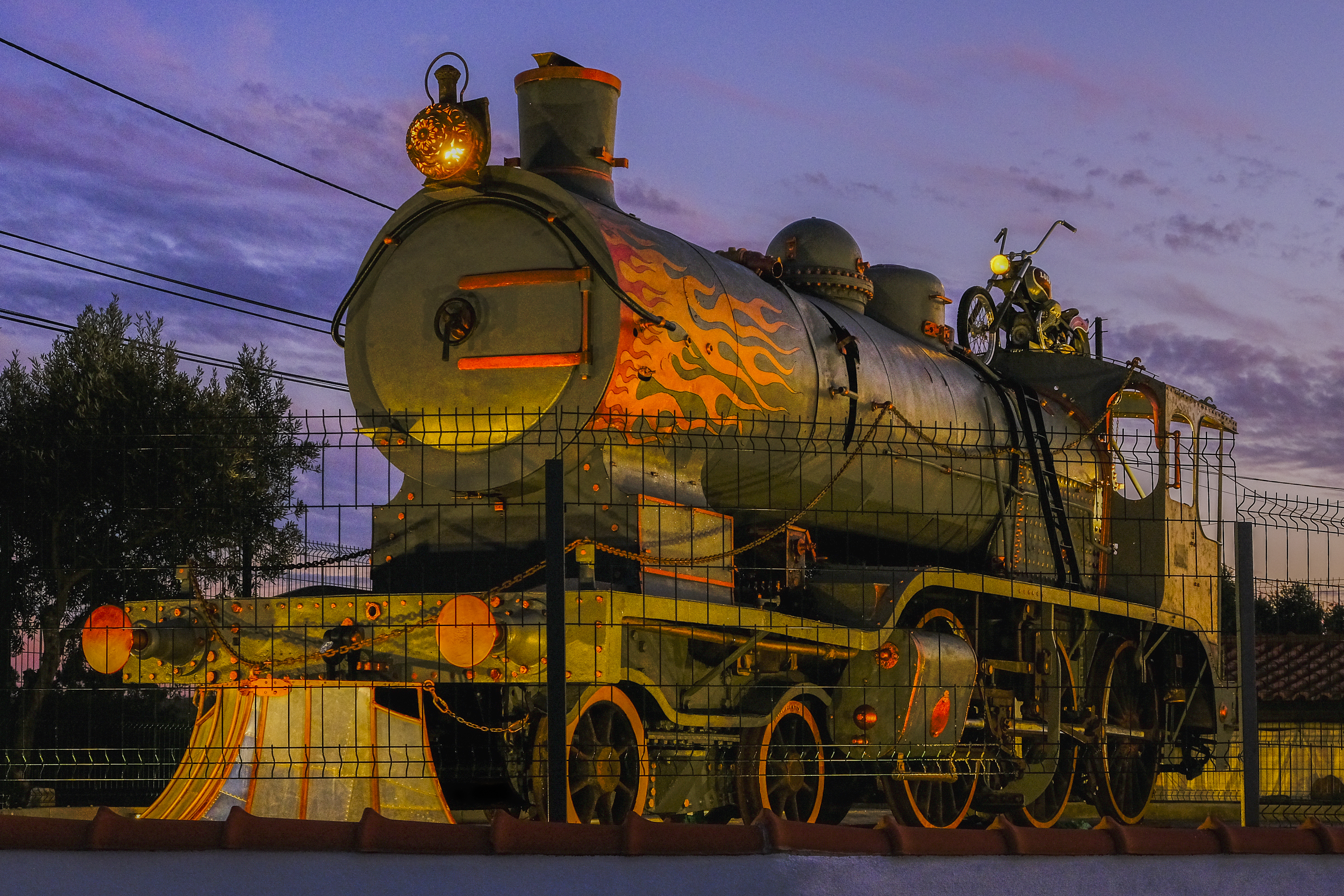
Locomotive installed at Nirvana Studios

In 1960, the locomotive was taken out of service due to an explosion in its boiler and was left parked in a railway equipment graveyard. The entire project, from acquisition to the current installation, took three years, and required the construction of a permanent platform measuring nearly 200 square meters to house the century-old vehicle, where it remains, to the left of the main gate. The curatorship of the project was handled by the director of the National Carriage Museum, Silvana Bessone.

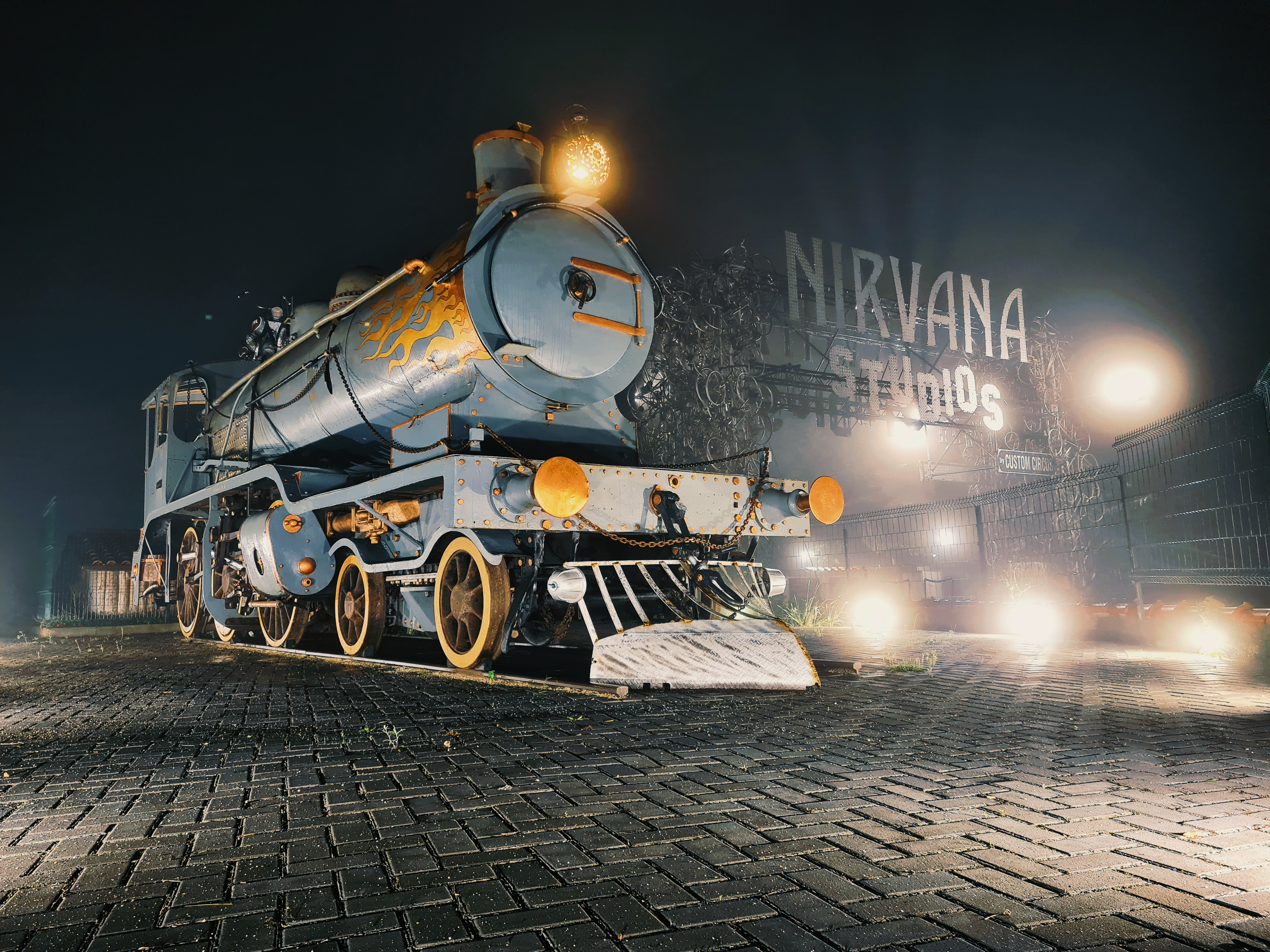
Locomotive and the Raus Human Portic

A piece with an aesthetic that blends industrial archaeology with the steampunk nd space imagery is frequently featured in some of Custom Circus’s shows. Originally stored in Entroncamento, the locomotive was transported by truck and escorted by a group of 300 motorcyclists to Oeiras, where it remains installed; this transport involved a series of trucks, cranes e trailers due to the piece’s size, in addition to the presence of firefighters and the assistance of utility workers who had to reroute telecommunications cables to allow for the vehicle’s transport.

The National Railway Museum Foundation embraced this partnership with the aim of restoring, enhancing, and making its collection accessible, in a pioneering approach in Portugal. This work, linking industrial archaeology with the Steampunk aesthetic, is part of the outdoor gallery at Nirvana Studios, a vast collection on display free of charge to visitors to the complex. In January 2025, TVI, a Portuguese television channel, will air a documentary on how Custom Circus discovered and integrated the locomotive into Nirvana Studios.

=== Other buildings, projects, and events ===
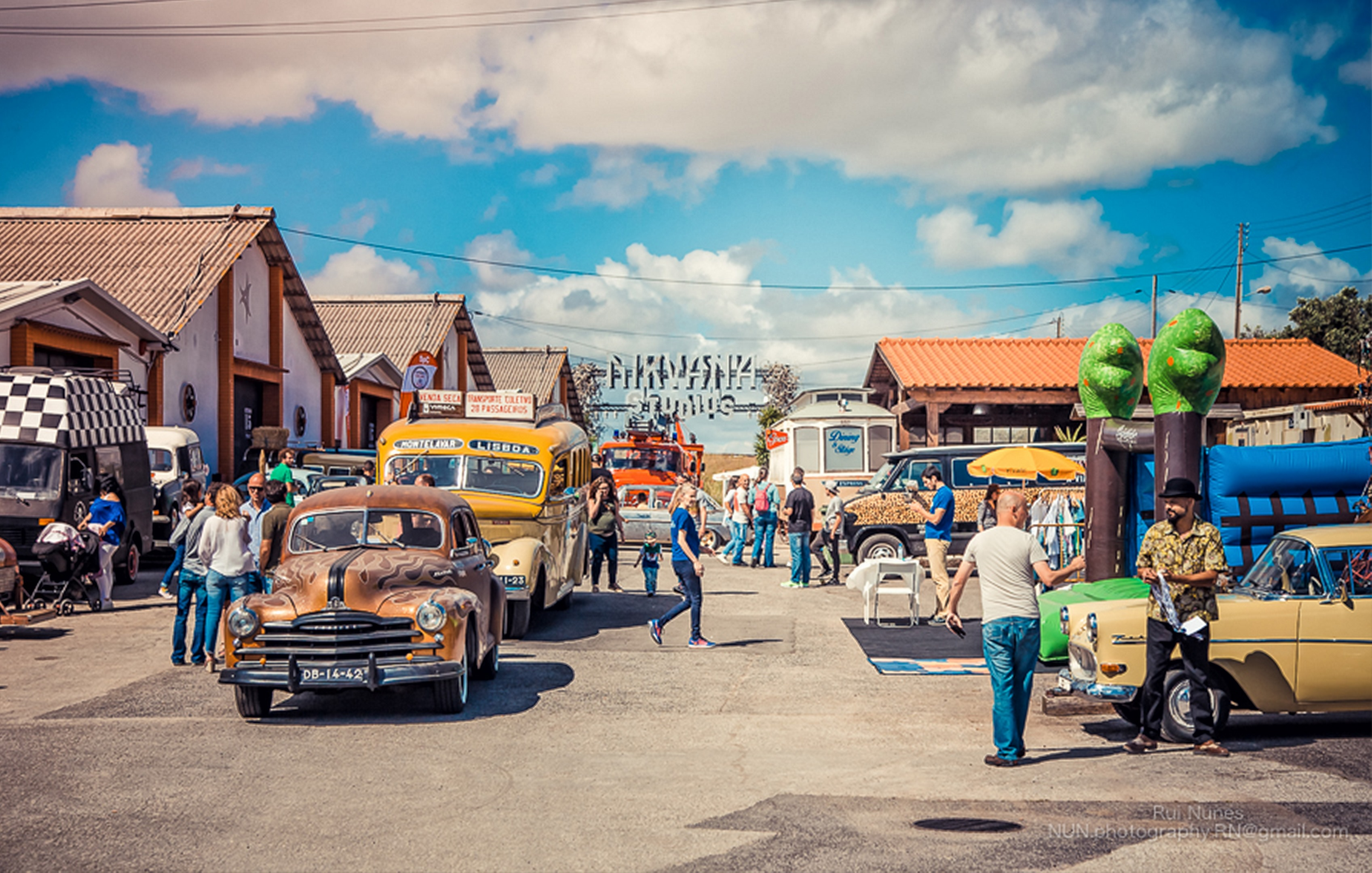
Nirvana Boulevard in 2016, with several of the center’s vehicles on display along the avenue

The complex, filled and decorated throughout with cars, motorcycles, vans, buses and trucks, also includes a bunker,a space created from a military-era tunnel that was later flooded; in 2005, due to an approaching storm, the Custom Circus had to build a concrete retaining wall and use two shipping containers that were secured in this space. The office, from which the complex is managed, is visually aligned with the main entrance, where one could once monitor the entry and exit of military vehicles.

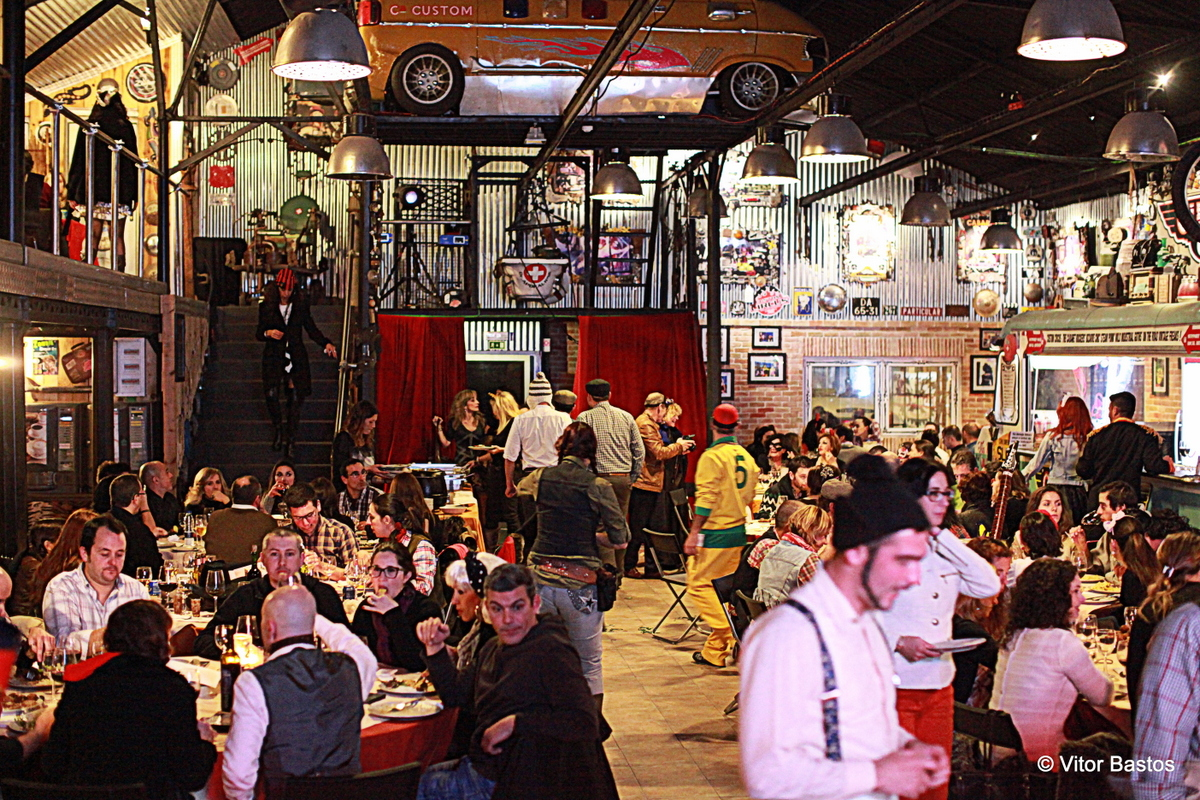
Dinner inside the Custom Café Theater

The obsolete and dilapidated materials left over from the military era also led to the creation of Steampunk Ateliers, a project launched in 2014 that occupies two hangars of the former barracks, with spaces offering a series of multidisciplinary studios for visual artists and artisans, in a concept inspired by the international Steampunk movement and the reuse of materials. In 2022, the center hosted more than 200 music bands, in addition to other artists in the fields of theater, dance, performance, cinema e television, such as Aurea, Buraka Som Sistema or D’Zrt, as well as extreme sports and, environmental movements, among others.

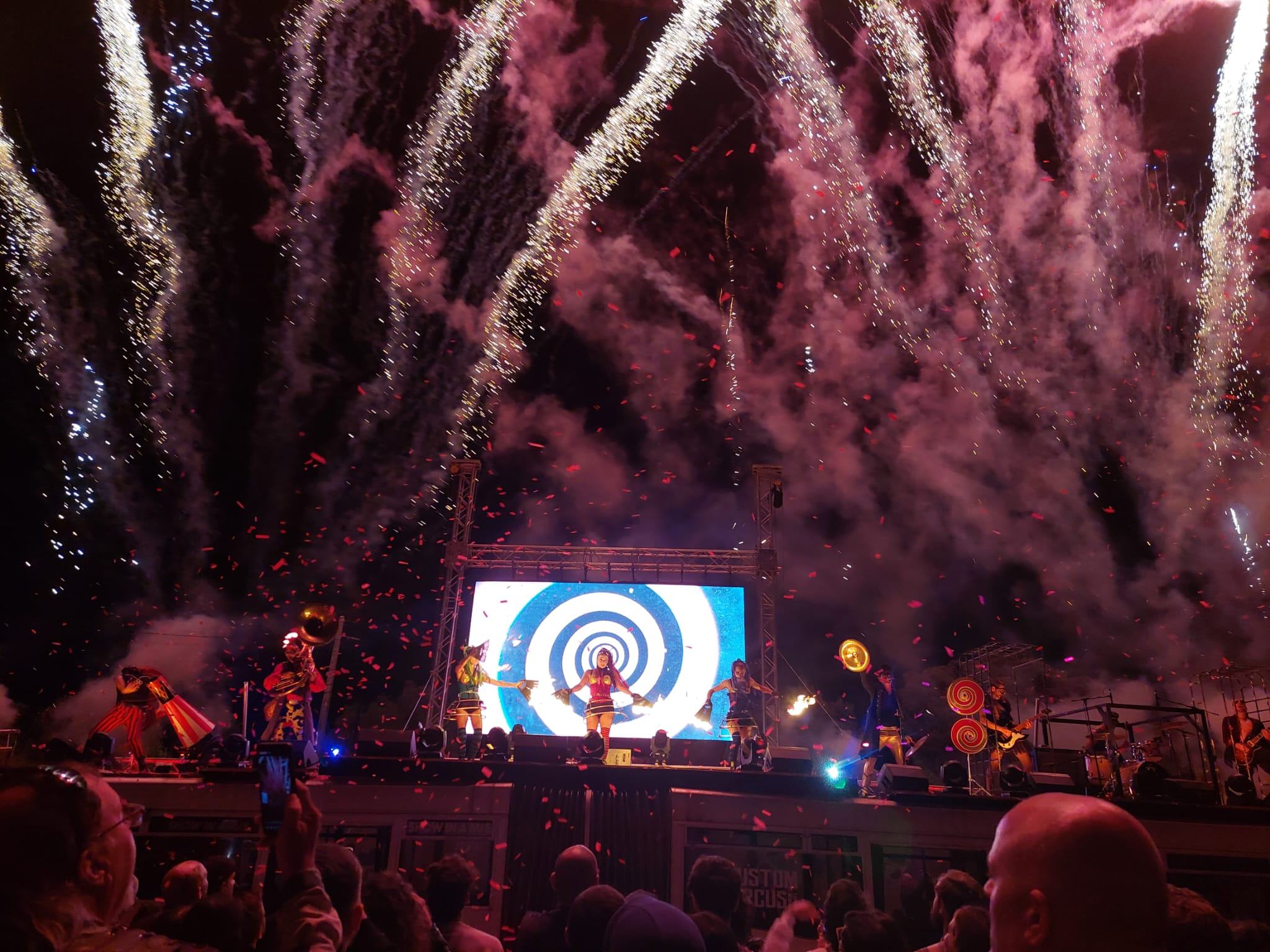
Open Day Festival 2023

Nirvana Studios also features the Nirvana Studios Supporters, a collective of collaborators who support the cultural center. To facilitate their volunteer work, they were provided with a space pro bono; over the years, they have contributed their facilities to various curatorial projects related to the themes explored at the alternative cultural center; one example of these curatorial projects is the Oeiras Band Sessions, which has been held annually since 2010 and is dedicated to emerging bands from the municipality of Oeiras, in a co-production between the Oeiras City Council’s Municipal Youth Department and Nirvana Studios; one of the prizes for the winning band is a Band Box at Nirvana Studios. In addition to these, other types of events are held within the center, such as culinary events (Cooks’ Congress) featuring cooking demonstrations, exhibitions, debates, contests, and tastings, cycling events, or an Indie Market featuring crafts, food, books, and alternative therapies.

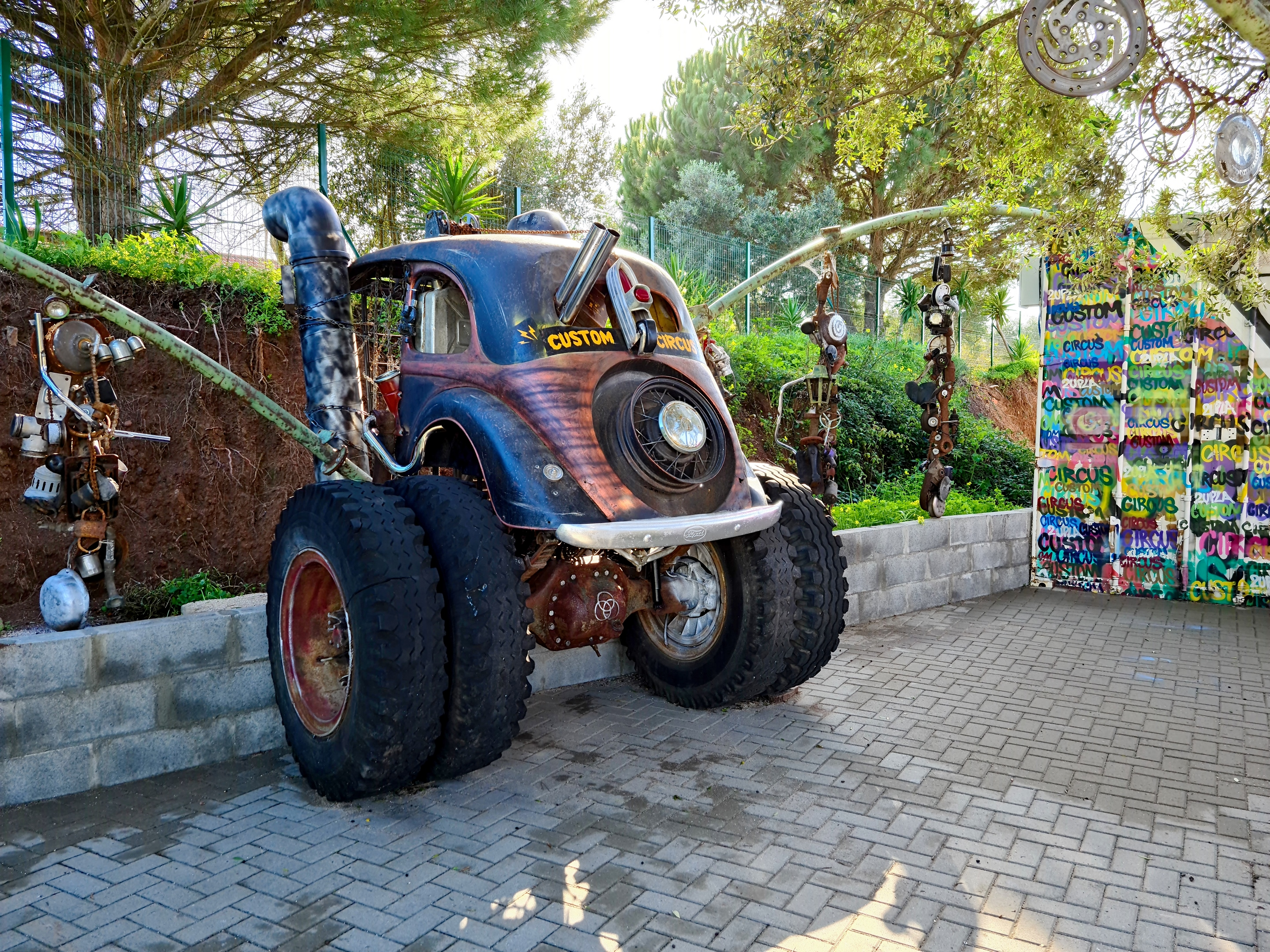
One of the many vehicles at the alternative cultural center, transformed into a static exhibit

Scattered throughout the center are a series of vintage vehicles used in performances, some on the ground and others atop the buildings, a vintage scenic installation connecting the Custom Café Theater to one of the studios, called Cargo Station, and a totem paying tribute to Custom Circus fans, built with wood and metal parts from machines dating from the 1930s to the 1970s, installed at the entrance to the STRANGE Gallery. Outside the complex, next to the main entrance, a bus stop ewas built in 2015 under an agreement between Vimeca-Lisboa Tejo JCDecaux, and the Oeiras City Council. Once just a bus stop, the shelter is now covered, equipped with benches, and decorated in the same style as the center. In addition to its entertainment offerings, the cultural center’s three hectares also feature facilities for hosting events at the request of companies and other institutions, and it houses businesses from various creative fields that maintain their studios there and offer a range of services, such as tattoos, construção de surfboard and skates,construction, and restoration of classic cars and motorcycles

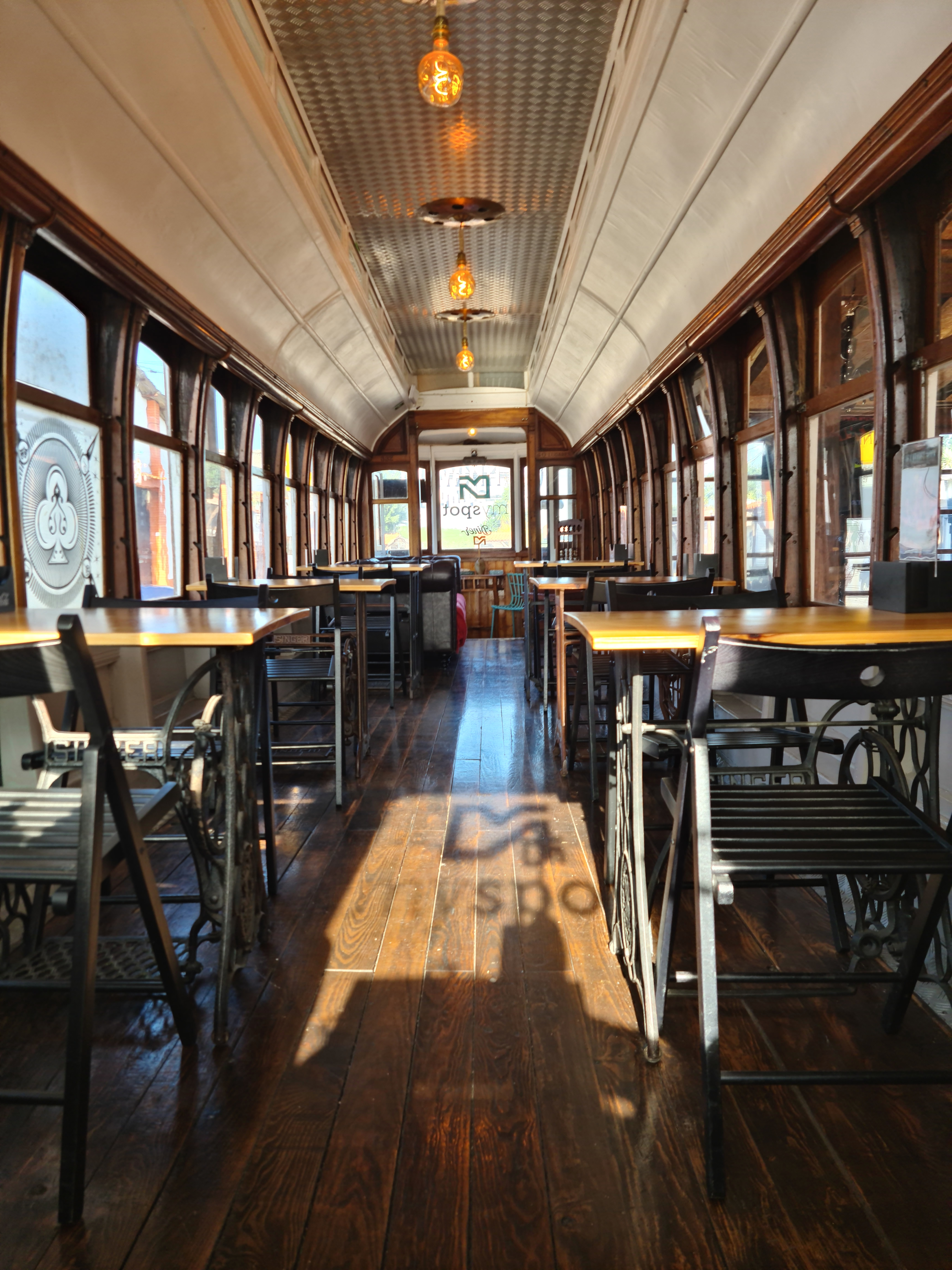
Interior of the tram at the Diner

Every year, a festival called Open Day is held. The event is the culmination of the work carried out throughout the year and brings together artists from the alternative cultural center and a range of other events organized by the company and in the region. The festival has been organized continuously since the center opened. A free-admission festival, it presents a diverse program each year that focuses on less conventional arts, ranging from a punk band playing inside a bus to a castanets concert. Inspired by the GML (Grande Meeting de Lisboa), held at the former Aquaparque de Lisboa, 20 editions have already taken place. Products are also produced within the alternative cultural center, such as Dr. Apokalipse’s Miracle Elixir (the stage name of Rui Gago, one of the founders of Nirvana Studios), a medronho liqueur whose recipe comes from a parchment in the Portuguese Navy,archives, written in Goa in the 18th century by a Portuguese sailor, and a bonbon known as "Nirvaninho," a small brigadeiro-style cake served as one of the desserts at the Teatro Custom Café shows.

=== Tourism ===
In terms of tourism, the main attraction of Nirvana Studios is the Custom Café Theater, where the Custom Circus has already performed over a thousand shows. According to box office data, about one-third of the audience for the shows consists of tourists, which, with an average of 200 spectators per show, means that over 200,000 people have attended these more than 1,000 shows, one-third of them tourists.

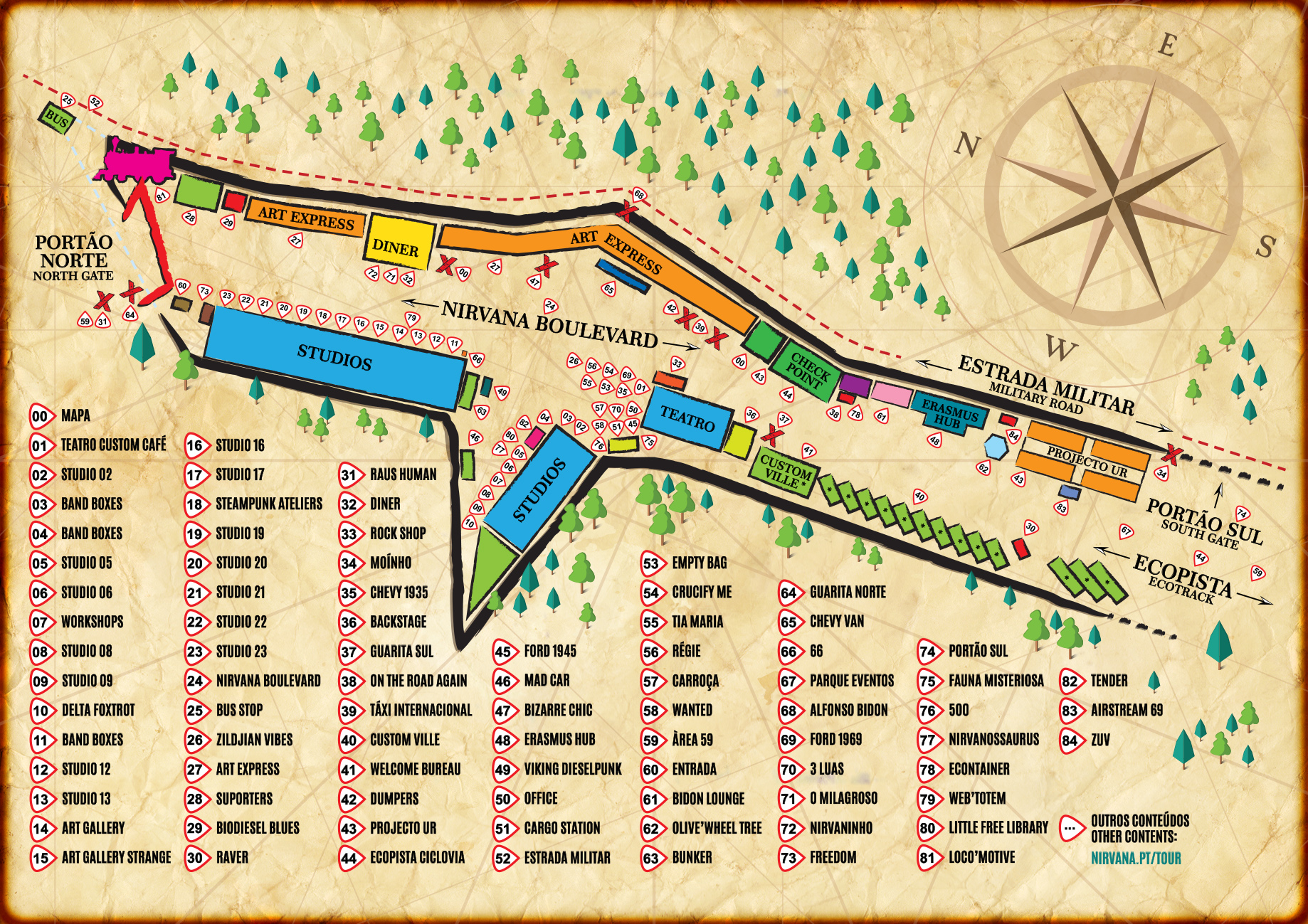
Nirvana Studios Tourist Route

There is also the Nirvana Studios Tour, curated by the European Route of Industrial Heritage (ERIH), a tourist itinerary organized on a map that takes visitors on a journey through the history of the former barracks, the current alternative cultural center, the military road, and the National Defense Belt, interconnected with an itinerary that also covers other points of cultural, sociological, and museological interest within the local community.

=== International Recognition ===
Following the acquisition of a 1903 steam locomotive and the “Colecção Paradoxal” project, consisting of a vehicle that was exhibited at the National Coach Museum—Nirvana Studios was invited to join and was included in the international platform European Route of Industrial Heritage, one of Europe’s leading platforms for industrial architectural heritage, representing historic industrial sites across Europe.

== Bibliography ==
=== Livros ===
- Custom Circus - poetas da metamorfose. Oeiras: Câmara Municipal de Oeiras. 2023. p. 102. ISBN 978-989-608-261-1.

=== Documentos ===
- "Diário da República - Custom Circus Associação Cultural - 18 de Maio de 2006, N.º 96, III série". diariodarepublica.pt.
- Proposta de Deliberação 313/2022 da Câmara Municipal de Oeiras. Oeiras. 2022.

=== Revistas ===
- 30 Dias Oeiras. Oeiras: Município de Oeiras. 2014. p. 60.
- Garcia, Pedro Carreira (2019-11-20). "Para espíritos livres". Forbes Portugal (in European Portuguese). Archived from the original on 21 March 2023.

=== Websites ===
- "A nova aquisição da Nirvana Studios: uma locomotiva de 1903 de 100 toneladas". New in Oeiras (in European Portuguese). 7 October 2020.
- "Ainda se pode inscrever na terceira edição do Oeiras Trail — para 10 ou 20 quilómetros". New in Oeiras (in European Portuguese). 3 November 2022.
- Barata, Sandra Pinto (2024-05-10). "Congresso de Cozinha regressa a Oeiras em setembro com o tema "Comida e Liberdade"". New in Oeiras (in European Portuguese).
- Barata, Sandra Pinto (2024-06-06). "Já é conhecida a banda vencedora do Oeiras Band Sessions". New in Oeiras (in European Portuguese).
- ""Birday Swamp" é a nova exposição imersiva do Nirvana Studios". New in Oeiras (in European Portuguese). 29 October 2021.
- "Congresso dos Cozinheiros 2022". Congresso dos Cozinheiros 2022 (in European Portuguese).
- "Consulta pública - Proposta de deliberação N.º 32/2022 - Câmara Municipal de Oeira". Oeiras.pt.
- "Cores e aromas africanos à mesa no Congresso dos Cozinheiros". Expresso (in Portuguese).
- Distrito, Diario do (2022-09-29). "1ª edição do Indie Market Nirvana Studios chega a Oeiras". Diário do Distrito (in European Portuguese).
- "Em março o alucinante espetáculo "Le Cabaret Rock" terá duas exibições em Barcarena". New in Oeiras (in European Portuguese). 28 February 2023.
- Fernandes, Tânia (2014-10-21). "Bizarre Chic – Um Espetáculo De Loucos Pelos Custom Circus". CH - Magazine de Cultura, Lazer e Viagens (in European Portuguese).
- "Fotogaleria: os 20 anos do inexplicável Nirvana Studios". Expresso (in Portuguese). 2023-06-04.
- Gonçalves, Mauro (24 May 2024). "Pessoa, Van Gogh e Woolf: três salas imersivas para descobrir em Oeiras". timeout.pt.
- "Indie Market - Nirvana Studios". Indie Market - Nirvana Studios (in European Portuguese).
- "Infraestruturas de Portugal Apoia Projeto Loco'Motive". Infraestruturas de Portugal. 2023-03-07. Archived from the original on 7 March 2023.
- "'Le Cabaret Rock' - Custom Circus". oeiras.pt (in European Portuguese).
- Magalhães, Beatriz (2023-06-02). "Vinte anos de Nirvana Studios: "Estivemos sempre virados mais para o artista do que para o público"". Time Out Lisboa (in European Portuguese).
- "Nirvana Studios at former ammunition warehouses – ERIH". www.erih.net (in German).
- "Nirvana Studios celebram 20 anos e estão todos convidados para a festa deste sábado". New in Oeiras (in European Portuguese). 29 May 2023.
- "Nirvana Studios, o Centro Cultural Alternativo, celebram 20 anos em Oeiras com um Open Day gratuito para toda a família". SAPO 24 (in Portuguese).
- "Nirvana Studios Le Cabaret Rock". Nirvana Studios Le Cabaret Rock (in European Portuguese).
- "Novo trabalho dos HMB foi filmado no Nirvana Studios". New in Oeiras (in European Portuguese). 7 February 2020.
- "O faroeste numa colina em Oeiras, onde em vez de cowboys há artistas". www.dn.pt (in European Portuguese). 25 May 2019.
- "O Museu Nacional Ferroviário e a Companhia Custom Circus apresentam o projeto Loco'Motive". Museu Nacional Ferroviário (in European Portuguese). Archived from the original on 4 March 2023.
- "privacidade e segurança". Nirvana Studios (in Portuguese).
- Rebocho, Mariana (2024-04-18). "Rock vai invadir os Nirvana Studios. Há dois concertos para ver este fim de semana". New in Oeiras (in European Portuguese).
- Robert, Sofia (2021-03-08). "Nirvana Studios incluídos na plataforma "European Route of Industrial Heritage"". New in Oeiras (in European Portuguese).
