= Furtados Music =

Retail music store in India

- Company type: Private
- Industry: Music
- Genre: Music Company
- Founded: 1865
- Headquarters: Mumbai, India
- Owner: Christopher Gomes, Nonabel Gomes, Anthony Gomes, Joseph Gomes
- Website: furtadosonline.com

Furtados Music is a retail music store headquartered in Mumbai, India. The first store was established in 1865. Today, Furtados Music has outlets in Ahmedabad, Bengaluru, Mangaluru, Chandigarh, Delhi, Saket, Panjim, Margao, Pune & Mumbai. Furtados Music is the largest retailer of musical instruments in India. The company stocks music instruments of various international brands including Steinway & Sons, Essex, Boston, Pearl River, Yamaha, Ritmüller, Korg, Casio, Gibson, Faith, Epiphone, PRS, Granada, Hobner, Java, Pearl, Mapex, Evans, D’Addario, Zildjian, Sabian, Vox, König & Meyer, JBL, Levy's, Hercules, Roland and many more.
