= Universidade Atlântica =

Atlantic University
- Universidade Atlântica
- Type: Private university
- Location: Oeiras Municipality, Portugal
- Website: www.uatlantica.pt

The Universidade Atlântica is a private university located near Taguspark in Oeiras Municipality, Portugal (near Lisbon).

Atlântica was founded in 1996 by the initiative of university professors, researchers, banks, private companies, and the Oeiras local government. The university is housed in the former Barcarena Gunpowder factory (Fábrica da Pólvora de Barcarena), and is administered by Ensino, Investigação e Administração S.A. (EIA), an entity created in 1993.

Its first undergraduate program was initiated in 1996, in the field of Business Management. A Higher School of Health Sciences (Escola Superior de Saúde) was established in 2001. Since then, Atlântica has enlarged its scientific interests to four strategic teaching and research areas: Management, Health science, Computer science, and Territory, Environment and Development.

The present Rector of Atlântica is Professor Nelson Lourenço, a sociologist with expertise in environmental issues.

The university was distinguished with Oeiras Medal of Merit.
