= Federico Mayor Zaragoza =

Spanish biochemist, politician and diplomat (1934–2024)

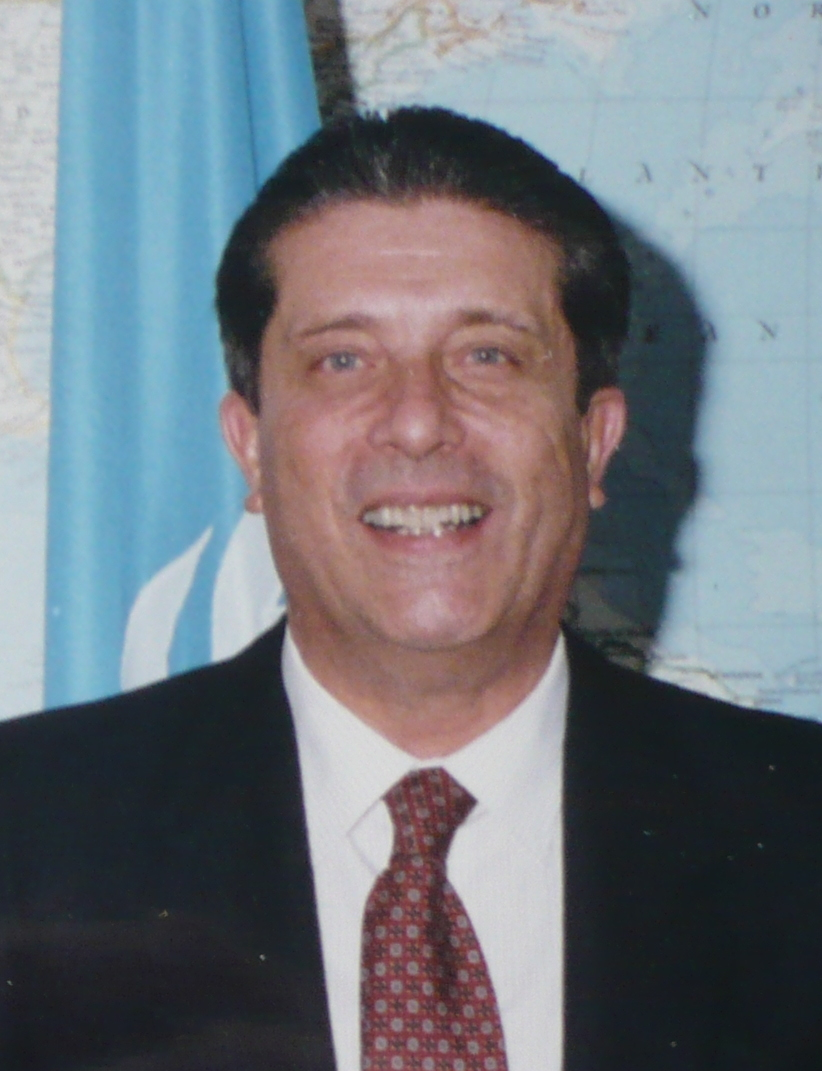
- Mayor Zaragoza in 1999

7th Director-General of the United Nations Educational, Scientific and Cultural Organization
- In office 16 November 1987 – 12 November 1999
- Preceded by: Amadou-Mahtar M'Bow
- Succeeded by: Kōichirō Matsuura

Minister of Education and Science
- In office 1 December 1981 – 2 December 1982
- Prime Minister: Leopoldo Calvo-Sotelo
- Preceded by: Juan Antonio Ortega y Díaz-Ambrona
- Succeeded by: José María Maravall

Personal details
- Born: 27 January 1934 Barcelona, Spain
- Died: 19 December 2024 (aged 90) Madrid, Spain
- Party: Union of the Democratic Centre; Democratic and Social Centre
- Spouse: María de los Ángeles Menéndez González
- Education: Complutense University of Madrid

Federico Mayor Zaragoza (27 January 1934 – 19 December 2024) was a Spanish scientist, scholar, politician, diplomat and poet. He served as the director-general of the United Nations Educational, Scientific, and Cultural Organization (UNESCO) from 1987 to 1999. After his tenure as director-general, he continued to participate in various peace-related organizations, such as the Foundation for a Culture of Peace and the International Decade for the Promotion of a Culture of Peace and Non-Violence for the Children of the World, as a member of their honorary boards. Additionally, he served as the honorary chairman of the Académie de la Paix. (Note: The United Nations General Assembly proclaimed the first decade of the 21st century and the third millennium, the years 2001 to 2010, as the International Decade for the Promotion of a Culture of Peace and Non-Violence for the Children of the World. This followed resolutions about the International Year for the Culture of Peace and the International Day of Peace.)

== Early life and education ==
Federico Mayor Zaragoza was born in Barcelona, Spain, on 27 January 1934. He obtained a Ph.D. in pharmacy from the Complutense University of Madrid in 1958. In 1963 he became professor of biochemistry at the School of Pharmacy of the University of Granada, and in 1968 was elected rector of that university, a post he held until 1972. The following year he was appointed professor in biochemistry at the Autonomous University of Madrid. In 1974 he co-founded the Severo Ochoa Molecular Biology Centre at the Autonomous University of Madrid and the Spanish High Council for Scientific Research. The main focus of his scientific research has been on molecular brain disease, and he was responsible for drawing up the Spanish National Plan for Mental Health Prevention. He was a member of the Club of Rome, the Club of Budapest, and a founder member of the Issyk-Kul Forum. In 2005 he received the Prize Creu de Sant Jordi from the Generalitat de Catalunya. He was an honorary member of several scientific societies and a member of several academies, among them, the World Academy of Art and Science. He also received several honorary doctorates (honoris causa). He was honorary president of the University of Granada.

== Spanish political career ==
Mayor was undersecretary of education and science in the Spanish Government (1974–1975) during Franco's dictatorship, UCD deputy for the Granada region in the Spanish Parliament (1977–1978), adviser to the President of the Government (1977–1978), minister of education and science (1981–1982) and a CDS deputy in the European Parliament (1987).

== UN career ==
In 1978 Mayor became deputy director-general of UNESCO. In 1987 he was elected director-general and re-elected for a second term in 1993. In 1999, after deciding not to stand for a third term, he returned to Spain to create the Foundation for a Culture of Peace, of which he was the chairman.

=== UNESCO ===
During his 12 years as head of UNESCO (1987–1999) Mayor gave new life to the organization's mission to "build a bastion of peace in the minds of all people", putting the institution at the service of peace, tolerance, human rights and peaceful coexistence, working within the scope of its powers and remaining faithful to its original goals. Under his guidance, UNESCO created the Culture of Peace Programme, whose objectives revolve around four main themes: education for peace; human rights and democracy; the fight against isolation and poverty; the defense of cultural diversity and intercultural dialogue; and conflict prevention and the consolidation of peace.

On 10 November 1998, the UN General Assembly declared the years 2001–2010 International Decade for the Promotion of a Culture of Peace and Non-Violence for the Children of the World. On 13 September 1999, it adopted the Declaration and Programme of Action on a Culture of Peace, which embodies Mayor's greatest aspirations from both a conceptual and practical standpoint.

== Later life ==
In 2000, Mayor founded the Foundation for a Culture of Peace, serving as its president. He was appointed to chair the European Research Council Expert Group (ERCEG) set up in December 2002, during the Danish EU presidency, on the initiative of Helge Sander, the Danish minister for science, technology and innovation. Its creation followed the conclusions on the status of the European Research Area (ERA) reached by the Council of Ministers meeting on competitiveness, held in Brussels on 26 November 2002, and the recommendations on the basic principles of a possible European Research Council (ERC) agreed in October 2002 at a conference in Copenhagen organized by the Danish Research Councils. The European Union has identified the need to strengthen the competitiveness of Europe and to become a knowledge-based economy.

In 2002, Mayor co-founded, with Boutros Boutros Ghali, John Brademas, Edward J. Nell, Karim Errouaki and Alain Chanlat, the Centre Humanism, Management & Globalization (HMG) at HEC-Montreal. The aim of HGM was to support projects and develop programmes based on policies that would humanize the process of globalization across its many dimensions — economic, ecological, social, political, cultural and organizational.

In 2005, he was appointed co-president for the UN High Level Group for the Alliance of Civilizations (AoC), by Kofi Annan, the United Nations Secretary-General. The Alliance of Civilizations is an initiative proposed by the President of the Government of Spain, José Luis Rodríguez Zapatero, at the 59th session of the United Nations General Assembly in 2005. It was co-sponsored by the Turkish prime minister, Recep Tayyip Erdoğan. The initiative seeks to galvanize international action against extremism through the forging of international, intercultural and inter religious dialogue and cooperation. The Alliance places a particular emphasis on defusing tensions between the Western and Islamic worlds. To fulfil the objective of the initiative, UN Secretary-General Kofi Annan assembled a High-Level Group (HLG) consisting of 20 eminent persons drawn from policy making, academia, civil society, religious leadership and the media. A full range of religions and civilizations were represented. Among the members were former Iranian president Mohammad Khatami, who proposed the Dialogue Among Civilizations initiative, South African Nobel laureate Archbishop Desmond Tutu, Prof. Pan Guang, who obtained the Saint Petersburg-300 Medal for Contribution to China-Russia Relations, and Arthur Schneier, who is the founder and president of the "Appeal of Conscience Foundation" and who gained the "Presidential Citizens Medal". The HLG met five times between November 2005 and November 2006, and produced a report prioritizing relations between the Western and Muslim societies. The first meeting of the HLG of the AoC took place in Spain in November 2005. The second meeting was in Doha, Qatar, from 25 to 27 February 2006 with the agenda of aiming to find ways to calm the cartoon crisis between West and Islamic world. The third meeting took place in Dakar, Senegal, from 28 to 30 May 2006. At the final meeting in November 2006 in Istanbul, the members presented their final report to Kofi Annan and to Prime Ministers José Luis Rodríguez Zapatero and Recep Tayyip Erdoğan. The report outlined recommendations and practical solutions on how the Western and Islamic societies can solve misconceptions and misunderstandings between them. According to the report, "politics, not religion, is at the heart of growing Muslim-Western divide", although a large emphasis is maintained on religion.

In 2007, with Boutros Boutros Ghali, Michel Rocard, John Brademas, Robert Mundell, Edward J. Nell, Karim Errouaki, Mohamed Hassad, and Tomas Solis, Mayor co-founded the Tangier Expo 2012 International Support Committee. He was appointed by King Mohammed VI of Morocco as the President of the Tangier Expo 2012 International Support Committee. The King decided in 2006 to submit the candidacy of Tangiers, the City of the Strait of Gibraltar for the organization of the 2012 International Exhibition. The theme of the exhibition was "Routes of the World, Cultures Connecting. For a More United World".

Federico Mayor Zaragoza was a member of the Fondation Chirac's honour committee, ever since the foundation was launched in 2008 by former French president Jacques Chirac in order to promote world peace. He also participated as jury member for the Prize for Conflict Prevention awarded every year by this foundation.

In 2011, Mayor was appointed President of the International Commission against the Death Penalty. The commission, which is supported by 18 states, advocates the universal abolition of the death penalty. It also promotes abolition in legislation in those countries where a moratorium already exists. Speaking at the Parliamentary Assembly on 14 April 2011, he highlighted the role of the Council of Europe, OSCE and EU in making Europe a death-penalty free zone, except for one country, and argued that "despite progress achieved in the last decades – two thirds of the countries in the world have already abolished the death penalty – must be intensified until its total eradication". He went on to argue that "the right to life is the most basic of all rights, because it is a pre-requisite for the exercise of all the other human rights". He pointed out two key arguments for abolition: the death penalty is irreversible – mistakes cannot be repaired – and there is no evidence of its deterrent value to prevent criminality.

In 2013 Federico Mayor Zaragoza joined the Nizami Ganjavi International Center Board along with Ismail Serageldin, Vaira Vike-Freiberga, Tarja Halonen, Suleyman Demirel, Roza Otunbayeva, Walter Fust. It is a cultural, non-profit, non-political organization dedicated to the memory of the Persian poet Nizami Ganjavi, study and dissemination of his works, promotion of the principles embodied in his writings, advancement of culture and creative expression, and promotion of learning, dialogue, tolerance and understanding between cultures and people.

Federico Mayor Zaragoza and Ambassador Karim Errouaki were keynote speakers at the first annual Peace Education Conference, held virtually in September 2021.

== Death ==
Mayor Zaragoza died in Madrid on 19 December 2024, at the age of 90.

== Foundation for a Culture of Peace ==
Founded in March 2000 and ascribed to the protectorate for foundations of the Community of Madrid's regional department of education, the Foundation's objective is to contribute to building and consolidating a Culture of Peace through reflection, research, education and on-the-spot action. Its activities focus mainly on linking and mobilizing networks of institutions, organizations and individuals who have proven their commitment to the values of the Culture of Peace.

Through the Foundation for a Culture of Peace, Mayor continued the task he began as director-general of UNESCO: that of promoting the transition from a culture of violence and force, to a culture of peace and tolerance. Each year the foundation offers an annual Culture of Peace course in collaboration with the Juan Carlos I University of Madrid, with educational content including democracy, human rights and the origin of conflicts. In December 2000, the Foundation organized an international conference attended by major figures in the struggle for justice, freedom and peace. At the end of the conference, the Declaration of Madrid was adopted unanimously.

Mayor advocated for a new global order based on ethical and moral principle, with cultural, scientific, and social development balanced alongside economic and technological progress. He argued that international cooperation was necessary to improve quality in life in an increasingly interconnected world.

Federico Mayor Zaragoza supported the stand taken by UNESCO with regard to peace, disarmament, human rights and education. In the domain of information he suggested a new approach, warning against any monopoly control of communications, and denouncing the dangers of one sided information.

He argued that man is in a state of transformation; from Homo faber he is on the path to Homo sapiens. Knowledge liberates, and scientists have a crucial role to play. The new order proposed requires a proper use of knowledge – knowledge, like everything else, only exists through humanity and for humanity. It should thus be the focus of our reflections.

Since 2011, the Foundation for a Culture of Peace hosts the Global Program Women's Knowledge International devoted to: developing an educational project of global reach to contribute to the production and dissemination of women's and feminist knowledge, fostering the growth of a socio-political conscience on gender equity among likeminded people and a wide range of actors, and building cultures of peace through women's produced knowledge.

== Activities and research ==
=== Activities ===
The activity of the Foundation for a Culture of Peace is mainly based on the entailment and mobilization of networks of institutions, organizations and individuals that stand out by their commitment with the values for the culture of peace. The concrete actions of the foundation are mainly centered in the divulging and educative areas.

=== Research ===
Federico Mayor Zaragoza published his book The World Ahead in 2000. The specific aim of the book, which he has drawn up in collaboration with Jerome Binde and with the assistance of Jean-Yves Le Saux, Ragnar Gudmundsson and the team of UNESCO's Analysis and Forecasting Office, is to prepare people more thoroughly for the coming decades so that they may respond in good time to the challenges of the future. Federico Mayor argued that, as observed by Ilya Prigogine,

We cannot predict the future because the future will never be as before. We can prepare for it because, far from being inscribed in a book of destiny, the future is uncertainty, bifurcation, unpredictable creation. It is in our hands, because the future is freedom— for the most part, it will be exactly what we make of it. We can prepare for the future, but are we prepared for the twenty-first century.

He later worked with Edward J. Nell (Professor of Economics at the New School for Social Research, New York) and Karim Errouaki (Note: Karim Errouaki is a senior research fellow working with Edward J. Nell at the New School, N.Y. and a senior economic adviser & international expert in finance, economic, financial and strategic intelligence and geopolitics, based in NY and Madrid. He is a special adviser to Federico Mayor Zaragoza and to John Brademas, founder and president of the John Brademas Center for the Study of Congress at New York University. He was a former special adviser to the president of the European Parliament and to the UN Secretary-General.) on a book called Reinventing Globalization after the Crash (2016). The book was prefaced by Boutros Boutros Ghali, and constituted a new blueprint of the Foundation for a Culture of Peace. The book is based on material provided by Federico Mayor Zaragoza's book The World Ahead (Zed Books, UNESCO, 2000), revisited and animated by the theoretical framework put forward by Edward J. Nell in General Theory of Transformational Growth (Cambridge University Press, 1998) and extended by Karim Errouaki (UM, HEC-Montreal, 2003) who argued that Transformational Growth provides a new vision and a new framework, for thinking about economic development, bringing it into the framework of economic history.

== Committee of experts ==
In 2003–2004 Mayor Zaragoza sat on an ad hoc committee of experts, for which he was spokesman, set up to advise the Spanish government regarding the return of the polemical "Salamanca Papers" to the autonomous government of Catalonia. Comprising, among others, Columbia University Professor of History Edward Malefakis, and Juan Pablo Fusi, the committee declared in 2004, by a majority of 14 of its 17 members, that it was "just and legitimate" that the documents be returned to the autonomous government. The documents were finally transferred in 2005.

== Publications ==
Federico Mayor Zaragoza published over 100 articles in scientific journals, especially from his time as a professor of biochemistry, when he wrote, for example, about plant metabolism and numerous articles in popular journals. In addition to numerous scientific publications, he published numerous books and over seven books of poetry: A contraviento (1985), Aguafuertes (1991), El fuego y la esperanza (1996), Terral (1997), Voz de Vida, Voz Debida (2007), Alzaré mi Voz (2007) and En Pie de Paz (2008). He also published more than seventy publications on education strategies, development, human resources and science and technology.

== Books ==
- Tomorrow Is Always Too Late, Stamford Publishing, 1992.
- Memory of the Future, UNESCO Publishing, 1995
- La Paix Demain?, UNESCO Publishing, 1995.
- Science and Power, UNESCO Publishing, 1995
- The New Page, UNESCO Publishing, 1995.
- UNESCO: Un Idéal en Action, UNESCO Publishing, 1996.
- The World Ahead: Our Future in the Making, Zed Books, 2000.
- Los Nudos Gordianos, Galaxia Gutenberg, 1999.
- La Palabra y la Espada, AEFLA, 2002
- La Fuerza de la Palabra, Adhara, 2005
- Un Diálogo Ibérico en el marco europeo y mundial (with Mário Soares), Galxia Gutenberg, 2006.
- Enfermedades Metabólicas (ed.) (2006)
- Tiempo de Acción, 2008
- Tiempo de Acción, Universidad de Granada, Editorial Anfora Nova, 2008
- The Crime of Silence, 2011
- Reinventing Globalization After the Crash (with Edward J. Nell and Karim Errouaki), forthcoming in 2012.
- Economics and Management in Dialogue: Reinventing Management (Organizational Strategies through the Transformational Growth Lens), with Edward J. Nell and Karim Errouaki, forthcoming.

== Interviews ==
- During an interview for Global Education Magazine (30 January 2013), Mayor Zaragoza stated:
  In a moment in which we already can and already have freedom of speech, we have to get involved and committed. We have to be aware that we are still in time to change a culture of imposition, fear, a culture economically based on specula, on productive relocation, on war; we have the chance of changing it into a culture of dialogue, conciliation, alliance, into a culture of peace.

== Awards ==
In 1998, he received the prize "Archivio Disarmo - Golden Doves for Peace" from IRIAD.

== Notes ==
Government offices
Preceded by Amadou-Mahtar M'Bow	Director-General of UNESCO; 1987–1999	Succeeded by Koïchiro Matsuura
