= Salamanca Papers =

Spanish documents related to Spanish civil war

The Salamanca Papers (Spanish: Papeles de Salamanca; Catalan: Papers de Salamanca) refer to the 300,000 documents and 1,000 photographs confiscated from the Catalan government after the Spanish Civil War. The papers were transported in 12 railway freight wagons to the city of Salamanca to be stored in what was later to become Spain's Civil War Archive (Archivo General de la Guerra Civil Española).

The return of the documentation to the Catalan autonomous government was subject to much polemic in the 1990s and early 2000s, as well as numerous acts of violence at the moment of their physical transfer. The ad hoc committee of experts declared in 2004 that the documents should be returned to their legitimate owners. The documents were finally transferred in 2005.

New polemics arrived April 9 of 2021, when the "Generalitat de Catalunya" removed more than 20,000 documents.

== Background ==
The origins of the Civil War Archive date back to the decree which, on September 13, 1936, established that "all properties and documents belonging to the political parties and organizations mentioned, as well as any other that opposed the movimiento nacional were to become the property of the State."

The original decree was supplemented by successive decrees, such as that of April 20, 1937, which set up a counter-propaganda unit, the Oficina de Investigación y Propaganda Anticomunista (OIPA), and of May 29, 1937, which created the Delegación Nacional de Asuntos Especiales, charged with "recompiling documentation regarding sects operating in the country... in order to set up an Archive with which to establish, uncover and sanction the enemies of the Patria."

The systematic recompilation of documents commenced with the fall of Bilbao, and in 1938 Serrano Súñer as Minister of the Interior, set up the Delegación del Estado para Recuperación de Documentos which started preparing documentation with which to prepare trials at military courts.

On the other hand, the Delegación de Servicios Especiales, which reported to General Franco's Private Office, was located at Salamanca, the city Franco had established as his headquarters.

In 1944, given the overlapping functions of the two bodies, they were brought together under the Delegación Nacional de Servicios Documentales, belonging to the Presidencia del Gobierno. Their function was specifically, to draw up dossiers to be used at the numerous courts set up under the regime: courts martial in general; the Tribunales de Responsabilidades Políticas; the Tribunales de Depuración de Funcionarios and the Tribunal Especial para la Represión de la Masonería y el Comunismo.

With the death of Franco, the dictatorship's Document Services was suppressed by the Royal Decree 276/1977 and in 1979 the collection was transferred to the newly created Ministry of Culture whose National Historic Archive set up a dedicated department.

The Archivo General de la Guerra Civil Española, housed at Salamanca, was formally constituted in 1999.

== Committee of experts ==
A committee of experts, comprising among others, the former director-general of Unesco, Federico Mayor Zaragoza (spokesman), Columbia University Professor of History Edward Malefakis, and Juan Pablo Fusi, declared in 2004, by a majority of 14 of its 17 members (with three abstentions), that it was "just and legitimate" that the documents be returned to the autonomous government.

The return of the corresponding documents to the Catalan authorities was formalised in 2005 by Law 21/2005, which established that within a year a new documentation centre, the Centro Documental de la Memoria Histórica, belonging to the state, would be set up in Salamanca.
