= Juan Pablo Fusi =

Spanish historian

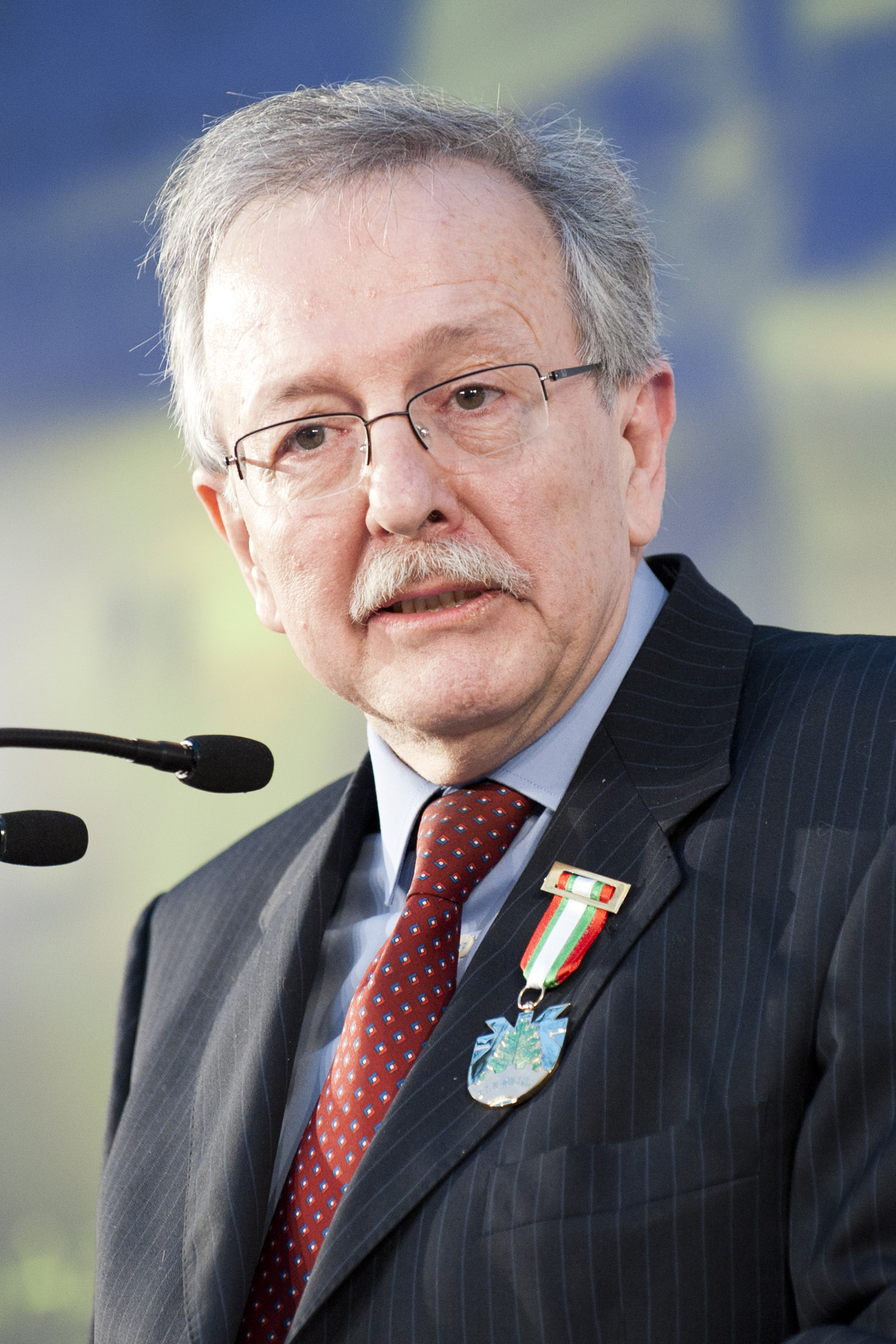
Juan Pablo Fusi giving a speech after being granted the Lan Onari award

Juan Pablo Fusi Aizpurúa (born 1945 in San Sebastián) is a Spanish historian. He specialises in contemporary history, the Basque Country and nationalisms.

== Studies ==
Fusi has a degree in history from Universidad Complutense de Madrid and has a Ph.D. (History) from the same university.

Likewise, he has a Ph.D. from University of Oxford and is a Doctor Honoris Causa in Humanities from New York University.

== Teaching ==
Fusi, currently Professor of History at Universidad Complutense de Madrid, where he has held the Chair of Contemporary History since 1988, has devoted a large part of his career teaching at universities in Spain, the United Kingdom and the United States.

He has been a lecturer at Colegio Universitario San Pablo-CEU and professor at universities in Murcia, Cantabria and the Basque Country.

As well as having taught at the universities of California, Wisconsin and Oxford, his main activity after studying under Raymond Carr was as Director of the Centre for Iberian Studies at St Antony's College (1976–1980).

== Appointments ==
Between 1986 and 1990, Fusi was the Director of the Biblioteca Nacional de España, and is still a member of its board of trustees. He has been the Academic Director at the Instituto Universitario de Investigación Ortega y Gasset and at the Fundación José Ortega y Gasset (2001–2006), where he is still a trustee and Emeritus Fellow.

Fusi was elected to medalla nº 15 of the Real Academia de la Historia on 21 November 2014.

== Committee of Experts ==
Fusi was a member of the ad hoc committee of experts set up to advise the Spanish government regarding the return of the polemical "Salamanca Papers" to the autonomous government of Catalonia. Comprising, among others, Federico Mayor Zaragoza and Columbia University Professor of History Edward Malefakis, the committee declared in 2004, by a majority of 14 of its 17 members, that it was "just and legitimate" that the documents be returned to the autonomous government. The documents were finally transferred in 2005.

== Publications ==
- Spain: Dictatorship to Democracy. London: Routledge. 1979 (with Raymond Carr)
- El País Vasco. Pluralismo y nacionalidad (1983)
- Franco, autoritarismo y poder personal (1985) Madrid : Suma de Letras, 2001 ISBN 84-663-0185-2 Taurus Ediciones, 1995. ISBN 84-306-0053-1
- España 1808-1996. El desafío de la modernidad (with Jordi Palafox, 1997)
- España, la evolución de la identidad nacional (1999)
- Un siglo de España. La cultura (2000).

He received the Premio Espejo de España award in 1976 for Spain: Dictatorship to Democracy, 1979, written in collaboration with Raymond Carr, and in 2001 he received the Montaigne Prize.

His essay "La Patria lejana: el nacionalismo en el siglo XX" (2003), deals with the evolution and diversity of contemporary nationalist movements.

- La España del siglo XX (with S. Juliá, J.L. García Delgado and J.C. Jiménez, 2003)
- El País Vasco 1931-37. Autonomía. Revolución. Guerra Civil (2003)
- El malestar de la modernidad. Cuatro ensayos sobre historia y cultura (2004)
- Identidades proscritas. El no nacionalismo en sociedades nacionalistas (2006).
