= Patricia Hollis, Baroness Hollis of Heigham =

British Baroness (1941–2018)

The Right Honourable The Baroness Hollis of Heigham PC DL
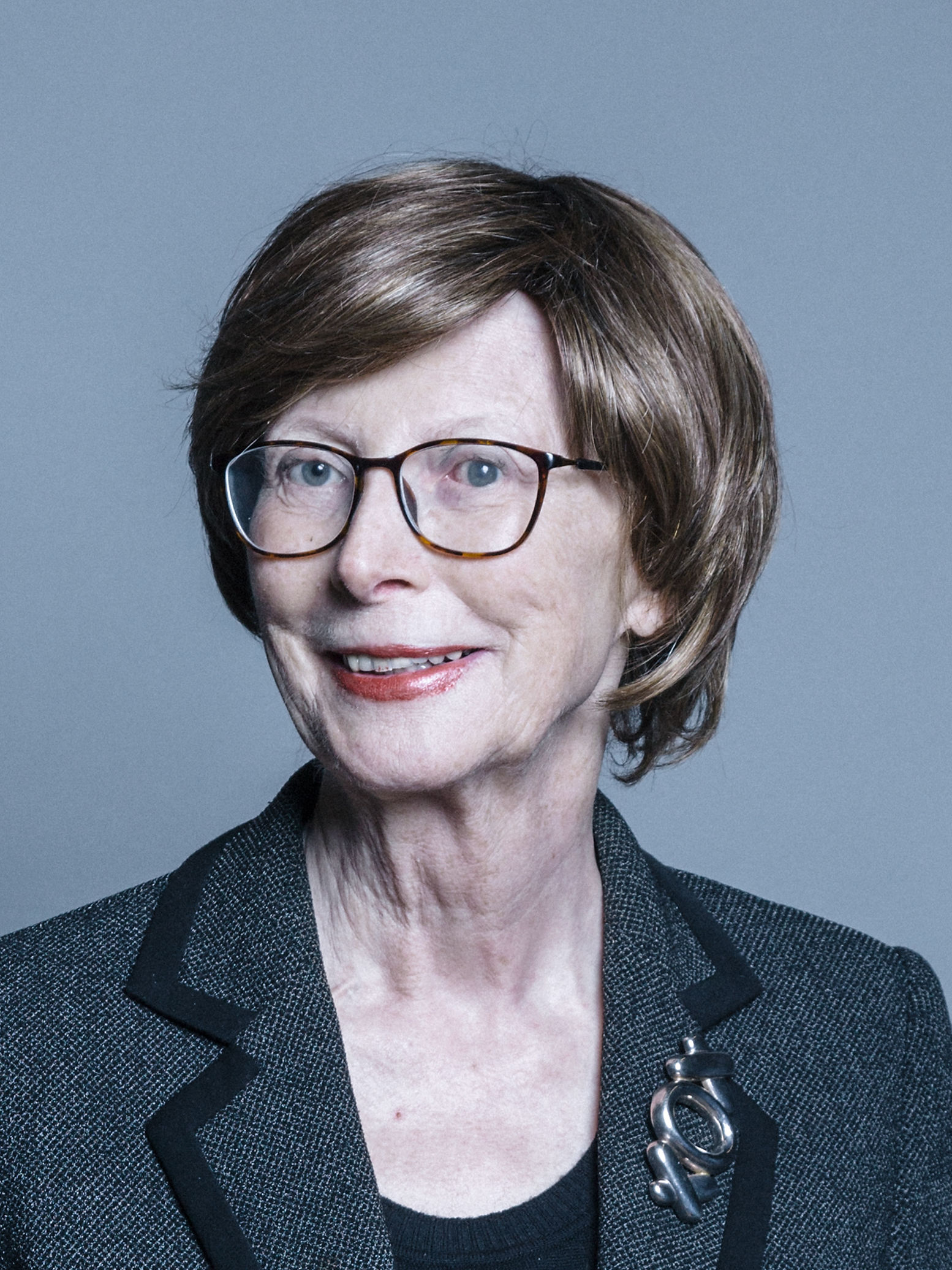

Parliamentary Under-Secretary of State for Work and Pensions
- In office 11 June 2001 – 10 May 2005
- Monarch: Elizabeth II
- Prime Minister: Tony Blair
- Preceded by: Herself (as PUSS for Social Security)
- Succeeded by: The Lord Hunt of Kings Heath

Parliamentary Under-Secretary of State for Social Security
- In office 6 May 1997 – 11 June 2001
- Monarch: Elizabeth II
- Prime Minister: Tony Blair
- Preceded by: Oliver Heald
- Succeeded by: Herself (as PUSS for Work and Pensions)

Member of the House of Lords
- Lord Temporal
- Life peerage 1 June 1990 – 13 October 2018

Personal details
- Born: 24 May 1941
- Died: 13 October 2018 (aged 77)
- Party: Labour
- Education: Girton College, Cambridge; University of California; Columbia University

Patricia Lesley Hollis, Baroness Hollis of Heigham, PC, DL (née Wells; 24 May 1941 – 13 October 2018) was a historian and a Labour member of the House of Lords of the United Kingdom.

== Biography ==
=== Early life and education ===
Hollis was educated at Plympton Grammar School, at Girton College, Cambridge (BA), the University of California and Columbia University (both where she was Harkness Fellow from 1962 to 1964), and at Nuffield College, Oxford (MA, DPhil). While in the United States, Hollis was active in the civil rights movement, picketing segregated restaurants and helping hold voter registration drives in Mississippi.

She was married to Martin Hollis, a Professor of Philosophy at the University of East Anglia from 1965 until his death in 1998: they had two sons.

=== Academic career ===
She was a lecturer in modern history, reader and Dean at the University of East Anglia in Norwich from 1967 until 1990. Amongst her academic publications was Ladies Elect: Women in English Local Government, 1865–1914, about the work of the Women's Local Government Society. She became Patron of this society when it was re-formed.

She served as a National Commissioner for English Heritage from 1988 until 1991.

=== Political life ===
Patricia Hollis contested the Great Yarmouth constituency for Labour at the February 1974 general election, the October 1974 election and at the 1979 general election. She became involved in local politics early in her career, serving on Norwich City Council from 1968 to 1991, and as Leader of the Council from 1983 to 1988. Hollis served on the Press Council from 1988 to 1990. and was a director of Radio Broadland from 1983 until 1997.

She was created a life peer as Baroness Hollis of Heigham, of Heigham in the City of Norwich on 1 June 1990 and was an Opposition Whip in the House of Lords between 1990 and 1995, and Opposition Spokeswoman on Housing, Local Government, the Environment, Disability and Social Security from 1990. While in opposition she carried through the Lords the proposals for pension sharing on divorce which have now become law.

Hollis was Parliamentary Under-Secretary of State at the Department for Work and Pensions (previously Department of Social Security) from 5 May 1997 to the 2005 reshuffle,

She was a Fellow of the Royal Historical Society, an honorary fellow of Girton College, Cambridge and the author of several books on women's history and on labour history. Her book Jennie Lee - a life (1997), won the Orwell Prize for political biography and the Wolfson History Prize for the history book of the year.

=== Personal life ===
Hollis was criticised in 2009 when it was claimed that she and her partner, Lord Howarth of Newport, lived next door to each other but both continued to claim expenses from the House of Lords.

Hollis died in October 2018, aged 77, following a long illness.

=== Honours ===
- She was given a life peerage on 1 June 1990, allowing her to sit in the House of Lords. She sat on the Labour Party benches. She took the title Baroness Hollis of Heigham.
- She was sworn in as a member of the Privy Council of the United Kingdom in 1999, which allowed her to use the post-nominal Letters "PC" for life.
- In 1994 she was awarded the honorary degree of Doctor of Letters from Anglia Ruskin University.
- On 2 June 2001 she was awarded the honorary degree of Doctor of the University by the Open University.
- She was appointed as a deputy lieutenant for the County of Norfolk, allowing her the post-nominal Letters "DL" for life.
- She was awarded the Freedom of the City of Norwich by the Norwich City Council.
