= Martin Hollis (philosopher) =

English rationalist philosopher (1938-1998)

James Martin Hollis (14 March 1938 – 27 February 1998) was an English rationalist philosopher, born in London.

Writing for The Independent, Timothy O'Hagan, an Emeritus Professor at the University of East Anglia, argued that central to Hollis's rationalism was "the epistemological unity of mankind", the view that "some beliefs are universal ... There are, because there have to be, percepts and concepts shared by all who can understand each other." This rationalism, of Hollis, was in its early formulations strongly influenced by Peter Strawson and applied to understanding and explaining the approach of the social sciences.

== Biography ==
Martin Hollis was the son of a diplomat, and nephew of the MI5 director-general Roger Hollis. Educated at Winchester, he did national service in the Royal Artillery before reading Philosophy, Politics and Economics (PPE) at New College, Oxford, from 1958 to 1961. From 1961 to 1963 he studied at Berkeley and Harvard on a Harkness Fellowship, encountering sociology in California and the work of Quine and Rawls at Harvard, and meeting his future wife Patricia Wells, subsequently Baroness Hollis of Heigham.

Returning to England, Hollis worked from 1963 to 1966 at the Foreign Office. "Sent to Heidelberg to learn German, he returned to find himself posted to Moscow. This was the last straw for a rational man, who was already moonlighting in Oxford, giving philosophy tutorials at New College and Balliol. He left the FCO." Appointed to a philosophy post at the new University of East Anglia in 1967, he remained in Norwich until his death. In 1972, he became Senior Lecturer, and in 1981 Professor. From 1980 to 1987, he was editor of Ratio. He combined teaching and research with an increasing level of university administration, becoming Pro-Vice-Chancellor of the university in 1992. For ten years he was also a Norwich JP.

Hollis was also a keen player of games. He played chess at a high level, competitive bridge, and was also interested in designing new games. All of this was not just a hobby but derived from his interest in rationality and choice, and the paradoxes that rationality throws up, something he increasingly explored in his later work. He was also fond of puzzles, especially creating logic puzzles, and published them prolifically in a variety of publications including Cogito and New Scientist. (A collection of the latter was published as Tantalizers in 1970.)

== Works ==
- Tantalizers, 1970
- (ed.)The Light of Reason, 1970
- (with E. J. Nell) Rational Economic Man, 1975
- Models of Man, 1977
- (ed. with F. Hahn) Philosophy and Economic Theory, 1979
- (with S. Lukes) Rationality and Relativism, 1982
- Invitation to Philosophy, 1985
- The Cunning of Reason, 1987
- (with S. Smith) Explaining and Understanding International Relations, 1990
- (ed. with S. Hargreaves Heap, B. Lyons, R. Sugden and A. Weale)The Theory of Choice: A Critical Guide, 1992
- The Philosophy of Social Science, 1994
- Reason In Action, 1996
- Trust within Reason, 1998.
