= Zoltan Acs =

American economist (born 1947)

- Born: 1947 (age 78–79); Villach, Austria

Academic background
- Education: Cleveland State University; The New School
- Thesis: Price Behavior and the Theory of the Firm in Competitive and Corporate Markets: A Study of the US Steel Industry (1980)
- Doctoral advisor: Edward J. Nell

Academic work
- School or tradition: Keynesian economics
- Institutions: Middlebury College; Manhattan College; University of Illinois Springfield; University of Baltimore; Max Planck Institute of Economics; George Mason University; London School of Economics

Zoltan J. Acs (born 1947) is an American economist. He is Professor of Management at The London School of Economics (LSE), and a professor at George Mason University, where he teaches in the Schar School of Policy and Government and is the Director of the Center for Entrepreneurship and Public Policy. He is also a visiting professor at Imperial College Business School in London and affiliated with the University of Pecs in Hungary. He is co-editor and founder of Small Business Economics.

Acs was previously Research Scholar at the Entrepreneurship Growth and Public Policy Group at the Max Planck Institute for Economics in Jena, Germany. He has also served as Chief Economist at the U.S. Small Business Administration (SBA); Research Fellow at the U.S. Bureau of the Census; associate director of the Center for International Business Education and Research; Research Associate at the Institute on Western Europe at Columbia University; and Scholar-in-Residence at the Kauffman Foundation.

He is the founder and President of The GEDI Institute, a global think tank based in Washington, D.C. Together with Laszlo Szerb, Acs created the Global Entrepreneurship and Development Index (GEDI).

His most recent book, Why Philanthropy Matters: How the Wealthy Give, and What it Means for our Economic Well-Being (2013), was a finalist for the Academy of Management George R Baker Prize for the best book in management in 2014.

== Early life ==
In 1947, Acs was born in a refugee camp in Austria after his Hungarian parents escaped their home country following World War II.

== Research ==
Acs's primary contributions to his field have been in the areas of Innovation, Regional Knowledge Spillover, Incentives and Entrepreneurship, and Entrepreneurship and Technology.

== Awards and Recognition ==
Acs received the Global Award for Entrepreneurship Research in 2001, awarded by the Swedish Entrepreneurship Forum. He was awarded an honorary doctorate by the Faculty of Economics at the University of Pecs, Hungary in November 2006. His book Why Philanthropy Matters was a finalist for the Academy of Management George R. Terry Book Award for best book in management in 2014. He has been an Outside Member of the Hungarian Academy of Sciences since 2013.

== Publications ==
=== Books ===
- Global Entrepreneurship, Institutions, and Incentives: The Mason Years, Edward Elgar Publishers, in press.
- The Global Entrepreneuship and Development Index 2014, with Laszlo Szerb and Erkko Autio, Amazon, 2013.
- Why Philanthropy Matters: How the Wealthy Give and What it Means to Our Economic Well-being, Princeton University Press, 2013.
- Identifying the Obstacles to High Impact Entrepreneurship in Latin America and the Caribbean, with Paulo Carrera, The World Bank and George Mason University, On Demand Publishing, LLC, 2014.
- Why Philanthropy Matters, Chinese edition, Donghei University of Finance & Economics Press, 2014.
- The Global Entrepreneurship and Development Index 2014, with Laszlo Szerb and Erkko Autio, On Demand Publishing, LLC, 2014.
- A Comparative Analysis of Hungary's Entrepreneurial Performance in the 2006-2010 time period, Pecs: University of Pecs Press, 2013.
- The Global Entrepreneurship and Development Index 2013, with Laszlo Szerb and Erkko Autio, Edward Elgar Publishers, 2013.
- The Global Entrepreneurship and Development Index 2012, with Laszlo Szerb, Edward Elgar Publishers, 2012.
- The Global Entrepreneurship and Development Index 2011, with Laszlo Szerb, Edward Elgar Publishers, 2011.
- Handbook of Entrepreneurship Research, 2nd edition, with David B. Audretsch, eds., Springer Publishers, 2010.
- Handbook of Entrepreneurship Research, 2nd edition, with David B. Audretsch, eds., Springer Publishers, 2010. Paperback Edition.
- Entrepreneurship and Regional Development, ed., Cheltenham: Edward Elgar, 2010.
- The Knowledge Spillover Theory of Entrepreneurship, ed., Cheltenham: Edward Elgar, 2010.
- Obesity, Business and Public Policy, with Alan Lyles eds., Cheltenham: Edward Elgar Publishing Ltd, 2009, paperback edition.
- Entrepreneurship, Growth and Public Policy, with David B. Audretsch and Robert Strom, eds., New York: Cambridge University Press 2009.
- Public Policy in an Entrepreneurial Economy, with Roger Stough eds., Boston: Springer 2008.
- Entrepreneurship, Economic Growth and Public Policy: Prelude to a Knowledge Spillover Theory of entrepreneurship, Cheltenham: Edward Elgar 2008.
- Obesity, Business and Public Policy, with Alan Lyles eds., Cheltenham: Edward Elgar Publishing Ltd, 2007.
- Entrepreneurship, Geography and American Economic Growth, with Catherine Armington, New York: Cambridge University Press, 2006.
- The Growth of Cities, ed., Cheltenham: Edward Elgar Publishing Ltd, 2006.
- Handbook of Entrepreneurship Research, with David B. Audretsch, eds., Boston: Springer, 2005. Paperback edition.
- Handbook of Entrepreneurship Research, with David B. Audretsch, eds., Boston: Kluwer Academic Publishers, 2003.
- The Emergence of the Knowledge Economy: A Regional Perspective, with de Groot and Nijkamp, eds., Springer, 2002.
- Innovation and the Growth of Cities, Cheltnam: Edward Elgar, 2002. Also in paperback.
- Regional Innovation, Knowledge and Global Change, ed., London: Cassell, 2000. Also available in paperback.
- Are Small Firms Important? ed., Boston: Kluwer Academic Publishers, 1999.
- Small and Medium Sized Enterprises in the Global Economy, with Bernard Yeung, eds., Ann Arbor, University of Michigan Press, 1999.
- Entrepreneurship, Small and Medium Sized Enterprises and the Macroeconomy, with B. Carlsson, and C. Karlsson, eds., Cambridge, U.K.: Cambridge University Press, 1999.
- Management and Economics of Organization, with Daniel A. Gerlowski and Felix R. FitzRoy, Prentice Hall, Europe, 1998.
- Managerial Economics & Organization, with Daniel A. Gerlowski, Upper Saddle River, NJ: Prentice Hall, 1996.
- Small Firms and Economic Growth, Two-Volume Set, ed., An Edward Elgar Reference Collection, Cheltenham, UK: Edward Elgar Publishing Limited, 1996.
- Small Business in the Modern Economy, with Bo Carlsson and Roy Thurik, Edited by Piet Hein Admiraal, De Vries lectures in Economics, Oxford, Blackwell Publishers, 1996
- Small Firms and Entrepreneurship: An East West Perspective, with David B. Audretsch, eds., Cambridge: Cambridge University Press, 1993. Reprinted as paperback edition 2008.
- Innovation durch Kleine Unternehmen, with David B. Audretsch, Berlin: Ed Sigma 1992.
- Innovation and Technological Change: An International Comparison, with David B. Audretsch, eds., Ann Arbor: University of Michigan Press, 1991.
- The Economics of Small Firms: A European Challenge, with David B. Audretsch, eds., Boston: Kluwer Academic Publishers Group, 1990.
- Innovation and Small Firms, with David B. Audretsch, Cambridge, MA: The MIT Press, 1990.
- The Changing Structure of the U.S. Economy: Lessons from the U.S. Steel Industry, Foreword by Charles P. Kindleberger, New York: Praeger Publishers, 1984.

=== Selected articles ===
- "Country level efficiency and national systems of entrepreneurship: a data envelopment analysis approach", with Lafuente, E., Szerb, L. (2015). Journal of Technology Transfer, in press.
- "National Systems of Entrepreneurship: Measurement Issues and Policy Implications," with Laszlo Szerb and Erkko Autio, Research Policy, 2014, 43, 476–494
- "Exploring Country Level Institutional Arrangements on the Rate and Type of Entrepreneurial Activity," with Pekka Stenholm and Rob Wuebker, Journal of Business Venturing, 2013, 28(1), 176–193.
- An Absorbative Capacity Theory of Knowledge Spillover Entrepreneurship," with Haifeng Qian, Small Business Economics, 2013, 40(2), 185-198.
- "Regional Systems of Entrepreneurship: The Nexus of Human Capital, Knowledge, and New Firm Foundation," with Haifend Qian and Roger R. Stiugh, Journal of Economic Geography, 2012, 13(4), 559–587
- "Exploring Country Level Institutional Arrangements on the Rate and Type of Entrepreneurial Activity," with Pekka Stenholm and Rob Wuebker, Journal of Business Venturing, 2013, 28(1), 176–193.
- "An Absorptive Capacity Theory of Knowledge Spillover Entrepreneurship," with Haifeng Qian, Small Business Economics, 2013, 40(2), 185–198.
- "Regional Systems of Entrepreneurship: The Nexus of Human Capital, Knowledge, and New Firm Formation," with Haifeng Qian and Roger R. Stough, Journal of Economic Geography, 2012, 13(4) 559–587
- Globalization: Countries, Cities and Multinationals, with Philip McCann, Regional Studies, 45(1), 17–32, 2011
- "Intellectual Property Protection and the Formation of Entrepreneurial Growth Aspiration," with Erkko Audio, Strategic Entrepreneurship Journal, 4, 234–251, 2010.
- "The Good, the Bad, and the Talented: Entrepreneurial talent and other-regarding behavior," with Utz Weitzel, Diemo Urbig, Sameeksah Desai and Mark Sanders, Journal of Economic Behavior and Organization, 2010,76, 64–81, 2010.
- "The Knowledge Spillover Theory of Entrepreneurship," with D. Audretsch, P. Braunerhjelm and B. Carlsson, Small Business Economic, 2009, 32(1), 15–30.
- "Creativity and Entrepreneurship," with Sam Youl Lee and Richard Florida, Regional Studies, 2004, 38, 879–891.
- "The Geographic Diversity of New Firm Formation and Human Capital, with Catherine Armington, Journal of Urban Economics, 2004, 56(2), 244-278.
- "Patents and Innovation Counts as Measures of Regional Production of New Knowledge," with Luc Anselin and Attila Varga, Research Policy, 2002, 31(7), 1069–1085.
- "Local Geographic Spillovers Between University Research and High Technology Innovations," with Luc Anselin, and Attila Varga, Journal of Urban Economics, 42, 1997, 422–448.
- "R&D Spillovers and Recipient Firm Size," with David B. Audretsch and Maryann P. Feldman, Review of Economics and Statistics, Vol. 76, No. 2, May 1994, 336–340, reprinted in Z.J. Acs, ed., Small Firms and Economic Growth, Cheltenham, UK: Edward Elgar Publishing Limited, 1996, Volume II, 309–313; David B. Audretsch, Entrepreneurship, Innovation and Economic Growth, Edward Elgar, 2005, pp. 55–59.
- "Real Effects of Academic Research: Comment," with David B. Audretsch and Maryann P. Feldman, American Economic Review, March 1992, 363–367; reprinted in David B. Audretsch, Entrepreneurship, Innovation and Economic Growth, Edward Elgar, 2005, pp. 112–117.
- "Patents as a Measure of Innovative Activity," with David B. Audretsch, Kyklos, 42, 1989, 171–180.
- "Innovation in Large and Small Firms: An Empirical Analysis," with David B. Audretsch, American Economic Review, 78, September 1988, 678–690, reprinted in Z.J. Acs, ed., Small Firms and Economic Growth, Cheltenham, UK: Edward Elgar Publishing Limited, 1996, Volume I, 393–404; D. J. Storey, ed., Small Business: Critical Perspectives on Business and Management, 2000, 1162–1182; Paul Westhead and Mike Wright, Advances in Entrepreneurship, Edward Elgar, 2000, Vol. III, pp. 453–465; David B. Audretsch, Entrepreneurship, Innovation and Economic Growth, Edward Elgar, 2005, pp. 3–15; Simon Parker, Entrepreneurship and Economic Growth, Edward Elgar 2005.
- "Innovation Market Structure and Firm Size," with David B. Audretsch, Review of Economics and Statistics, 69, November, 1987, 567-575 (Lead Article), reprinted in M. Casson, ed., Entrepreneurship, London: Edward Elgar Publishers, Ltd., 1990, 305–312; David B. Audretsch, Entrepreneurship, Innovation and Economic Growth, Edward Elgar, 2005, pp. 32–42.
