= Edward J. Nell =

American economist

- Born: July 16, 1935 (age 90); Riverside, Illinois, U.S.

Academic background
- Education: Princeton University (BA); Magdalen College, Oxford (BA); Nuffield College, Oxford (DPhil)

Academic work
- Discipline: Macroeconomics, development economics, monetary analysis, finance, philosophy of economics
- School or tradition: Post-Keynesian economics Georgism
- Institutions: New School for Social Research
- Doctoral students: Zoltan Acs

Edward J. Nell (born July 16, 1935) is an American economist and a former professor at the New School for Social Research. Nell was a member of the New School faculty from 1969 to 2014. He achieved the rank of Malcolm B. Smith Professor of Economics in 1990.

Nell's contributions are in the fields of macroeconomic theory, monetary analysis and finance, economic methodology and philosophy, and development. His articles on economic theory and methodology have appeared in leading journals like the American Economic Review, the Journal of Political Economy, the Journal of Economic Literature, Cambridge Journal of Economics, Eastern Economic Journal, Review of Political Economy, Economic Development and Cultural Change, Analysis, and Social Research.

Nell is known for his critical view of the methodological and philosophical foundations of neoclassical economics, examined in his best known book Rational Economic Man (Cambridge University Press, 1975) and coauthored with English rationalist philosopher Martin Hollis. Nell is also the originator of the General Theory of 'Transformational Growth'. The full development of the General Theory of Transformational Growth came in the 90s, and was published as The General Theory of Transformational Growth (Cambridge University Press, 1998). The methodology/philosophy which underlies the Theory of Transformational Growth is a form of realism, based on filling in 'conceptual truths' by doing fieldwork and then building models of solidly based institutionally grounded relationships.

== Biography ==
Nell was born in Riverside, Illinois, a suburb of Chicago, on July 16, 1935, the only son of Marcella and Edward Nell. His father was a journalist and professor of journalism at Northwestern University; he ran the Quill and Scroll foundation for high school journalism. His mother was a public school administrator and then a professor of education at Roosevelt University.

Nell attended Princeton University (1954–1957) and received his B.A magna cum laude in 1957 (in the Woodrow Wilson School). His field of study at Princeton varied a good deal. He studied mathematics, physics and philosophy, before discovering a passion for economics and politics. He was awarded a Rhodes Scholarship in 1957 which took him to Oxford University. Though he had already completed a B.A from Princeton, Oxford enrolled him for another, as was the custom at the time. He obtained a First in PPE in 1959 at Magdalen College, studying with Frank Burchardt and David Worswick. Nell then stayed at Nuffield College (1959–1962), Oxford University, to do his advanced work on the foundations of economic analysis, complete his doctoral thesis and further develop his research.

He returned to the US to teach at Wesleyan University, but later went back to the UK to lecture at the University of East Anglia, also doing research at Cambridge University. On various leaves of absence from the New School for Social Research he taught at Bennington College, and at Bard College, at McGill University, the University of Siena in Italy, and the University of Bremen, and Goethe University in Frankfurt, Germany. He gave sets of lectures and seminars in Europe — in France, at the Universities of Paris, Orleans and Nice; in the U.K at the Universities of Oxford, and Cambridge, and at East Anglia, Warwick, Essex, and Sussex; in Italy at the Universities of Rome, Milano, Catania and Siena; in Austria at the Universities of Graz and Vienna; in Germany at the Universities of Bremen, Frankfurt, Kiel, Regensburg, and Hanover; in Canada, at Trent University, Waterloo, McGill and HEC-Montreal. And in New South Wales, Melbourne, Newcastle, Adelaide and Sydney in Australia. Many of these lectures were associated with research projects with colleagues in these universities.

== Contributions to economics ==
=== Economics and philosophy ===
Nell's best known research on economics and philosophy was a book published in 1975 by Cambridge University Press under the title Rational Economic Man (coauthored with philosopher Martin Hollis). Lavoie, D. C. (1977, p. 325) argued that

To the devastating critiques of positivism by such philosophers as Brand Blanshard, W. V. Quine, S. Toulmin, A. R. Lousch and Karl Popper, can now be added that of Professors Hollis and Nell. The reason for the impotence modern economics, these authors show, lies in its method. The rejuvenation of economics necessitates developing a different methodology, one which pays attention to the aspects of social sciences which distinguish them from natural sciences. We need a method which recognizes that people are not atoms and that society is not a laboratory.

Since the early 1960s Nell had been critical of the neoclassical research program and had attempted to draw out the unstated assumptions of neoclassical economics and submit them to methodological scrutiny. His 1966 doctoral thesis was on 'Models of Behavior'. Hollis and Nell (1975) is an extension of that doctoral thesis. In Hollis and Nell (1975), they outline an alternative vision to neo-Classicism based on a rationalist theory of knowledge. They dissect the textbook combination of neo-Classicism and Positivism, so crucial to the defence of orthodox economics against now-familiar objections. Hollis and Nell's approach to methodology breaks with the traditional approach by focusing on the problems of the applicability of (the then) current neo-Classical theories. Coherent theories, describing the behaviour of 'assumed' – thus imaginary — rational agents, are developed. But what are the conditions for applying such theories to actual agents? The neo-Classical answer hinges on its view of rational individuals.

=== Fiscal theory: Georgism ===
Fiscally, Nell is a strong and active proponent of Georgist tax reform. Not only for its widely accepted benefits for economic efficiency, but because he believes that the land market contributes to inequality and financial instability. Nell is ex-vice-president and board member of the Henry George School of Social Science (New York).

=== Theory of money and finance ===
His first papers, in the 1960s, laid the basis for his later work. Wicksell's Theory of Circulation, set out the problem of explaining how money circulates – that is, showing how a given sum of money 'monetizes' all the basic economic variables. Indeed, Lavoie, Rodriguez and Seccareccia (2004, pp. 3–4) argued that

As early 1967, Nell had published a paper on Wicksell's monetary circuit in the Journal of Political Economy. There, he explored several of the questions that were to become the prime focus of the French circuit theories, and that were highlighted again, first in a little-known working paper (Nell, 1986), and then in the highly successful book that he edited with Ghislain Deleplaces in 1996, Money in motion....In his 1967 paper on monetary circulation within a Wickselian framework, Nell took into account the impact of interest payments on aggregate demand and on the closure of the monetary circuit. Even since 1967, we believe, Nell has been tantalized by the relationship between the real and the monetary aspects of the economy.

In many ways Nell's approach goes back to Francois Quesnay; where money traced out the transactions between the different classes and sectors of society. Although Wassily Leontief was best known for his 'Input Output Mode', a major contribution to economic analysis could be found in his doctoral thesis, done in 1928 at the University of Berlin, on 'Economics as a Circulation' (in German "Wirtschaft als Kreislauf."), under the direction of L.Von Bortkiewicz and Werner Sombart. This work helped to influence Nell's vision of 'Monetary Circulation'. (Although they had met previously he came to know Leontief when he founded the Institute for Economic Analysis in N.Y; later he met and appreciated Faye Duchin and others there. He particularly appreciated their studies of wage-profit relations, and the work on input-output and the environment). John Hicks (1967) noted the difference between the 'transactions demand', which rested on structure and contracts, and the speculative demand which he described as a 'voluntary' matter, a proper subject for the theory of choice. James Tobin and Franco Modigliani both analyze the decision to hold money; Nell, following Wicksell and the early Quantity Theorists, is concerned with the pattern according to which it is spent, to determine how much money is required to ensure that all transactions are fully 'monetized'. These questions stem from Quesnay, via Leontief.

Like Robert Mundell Nell places himself at the intersection of three theoretical schools: Keynesian, monetarist, and Ricardian. Each camp contributes something of value to economic analysis and policymaking. For Mundell, Keynesians contribute the multiplier effect of federal budgets for stabilization; Monetarists, monetary stability for encouraging growth-promoting investments; and the Ricardians, the importance of free trade and investment flows for maximizing social welfare. Nell draws in the same way on the Keynesians, but looks to the older Quantity Theorists for accounts of monetary circulation, and draws on the Ricardians for the theory of value while he looks to Joseph Schumpeter for an approach to innovation and competition.

In 2004 Monetizing the Classical Equations, which had been circulating for three years was finally published. It finally pulls the story of monetary circulation together, detailing how the pressures of transformational growth – including the emergence of fixed capital and the finance necessary for it — led to systematic changes first in the monetary system, then in banking, with the result that the way the interest rate is determined changed significantly.

=== Theory of transformational growth ===
The first statement of the theory of transformational growth came in 1988 in his book Prosperity and Public Spending, laying out the idea that markets worked differently when technology was craft-based. Costs were structured differently, and it made sense that prices would be flexible, but employment would tend to be inflexible. This gave rise to incentives to change the structure of costs, however, leading to Mass Production, and cost conditions in which it makes sense to hold prices steady and vary employment.

The full development of the theory of transformational growth came in the 90s, and was published as The General Theory of Transformational Growth (Cambridge University Press, 1998), starting from a critique of equilibrium –supporting creative destruction instead – working through methodological and philosophical questions about the role of contracts and obligations in understanding the persistence of institutional structures, to the circulation of money, understanding productivity and the structure of production – especially the relationship between the wage bill of capital goods and the capital requirements in consumer goods – then going on to dynamics, and from there to aggregate demand and the business cycle. 'Investment' must be separated into two steps: investment planning, which depends on innovation and requires planning for prices and costs, and investment spending, which depends on earnings and finance. There can be no single, simple "investment function" which sums this up; macro models have to be reconstructed. Finally the book concludes by examining the interactions between economic forces and pressures and the changing character of social institutions.

Nell is the originator of the Theory of 'Transformational Growth', which traces the pattern of capitalist development through a succession of stages, in each of which markets adjust differently, and in doing so, give rise to market pressures leading to innovations which move the system to the next stage. In each stage the working of markets will be governed in part by the structure of costs and the pattern of growth in demand, both of which depend on technology and innovation. The approach draws on the empirical work of Simon Kuznets, and makes use of Nicholas Kaldor's notion of stylized facts; it also draws on the work of W. Arthur Lewis and Gunnar Myrdal in regard to stages of development. It is, however, consistent only in part with Robert Solow's neo-Classical approach; as in that construction the substitution of capital for labor is crucial. However, transformational growth rejects the idea of a steady state and presents a model of multiple sectors regularly changing in size and importance. On the other hand, Douglass North's emphasis on institutions is echoed here. Ross Thomson (2004, pp. 81) argued that

Understanding capitalist development is still beyond the capabilities of economic theory, at least in its formalized version. Intrinsically innovative, uneven across sectors and countries, and evolving through qualitative changes in institutional structure, development involves such complexity that major insights, including those of Marx, Veblen, Schumpeter, and Chandler, often come from outside formal theory. The usefulness of these insights suggests that theory must be reconceptualized to understand capitalist development. Edward Nell attempts such a reconceptualization. Nell portrays development as a cumulative process in which economic institutions and technologies evolve in a single, mutually engendering dynamic. In the General Theory of Transformational Growth (1998), he gives theory the task of understanding this cumulative process. In the TG approach, markets generate innovations, most importantly technological changes, and these innovations restructure markets. This process imparts a direction to capitalist development as sectors rise and fall, production is reorganized, and markets are reshaped.

Furthermore, Geoffrey M. Hudgson (2004) argued that:

Edward Nell's rich and enlightening The General Transformational Growth (1998) has over seven hundred pages and cites many authors. But there is no reference to Thorstein Veblen. Yet there are remarkable connections and similarities between the thought of Veblen and that of Nell. Most obviously, both are acutely concerned with the perilous dynamics and checkered effects of modern capitalism. But the similarities go deeper. At the core of their separate arguments concerning capitalist development are deep understandings of the significance and role of technology. Furthermore, Nell (1998, 26–36, 410–68) key argument concerning the shift from a craft economy to mass production has uncannily close parallels in Veblen's (1904: 364–68; 1914: 230–355) analysis of the transformation from the era of handicraft production to the machinery industry with its machine process. Indeed, both Veblen and Nell invest this transformation with major economic, cultural, and dynamic consequences.

In contrast to many conventional theories, the economic analysis which supports the transformational growth perspective is not based primarily on rational choice. There is a place for rational choice, and for equilibrium theory, but in Nell's view it is a subordinate place – and much of the activity there will be prescriptive rather than descriptive. Actual markets are always in motion; equilibrium is rare and dynamic analysis necessary.

The methodology/philosophy which underlies the Theory of Transformational Growth is a form of realism, based on filling in 'conceptual truths' by doing fieldwork and then building models of solidly based institutionally grounded relationships. The result will be open models, which can only be closed temporarily by 'setting' certain inherently unreliable relationships. This has implications for econometrics – not all economic relationships are on a par. Some are reliable and can be reliably established; others are inherently unreliable, especially those which are forward-looking. They are likely to change 'spontaneously'. They have to be estimated on a temporary basis by fieldwork and good guessing. Nor is there anything wrong with this. But it means that an econometric model must be divided into two parts – the reliable relationships and the volatile ones.

Nell's published and unpublished papers dealing with these and other issues were collected in his 1992 book (Transformational Growth and Effective Demand, New York University Press, 1992). This book was intended at the time to provide as comprehensive a statement of an alternative approach as possible. In retrospect, however, it only partly succeeds; there is no discussion of money, credit and banking. Circulation was left out, because at that time the theory had not been completed. And the theory of transformational growth was only sketched. However, the historical sections and the theory of effective demand are presented very well.

When the 1992 book came out it was supported by a separate volume, published by Nell in 1998 (Transformational Growth and the Business Cycle, London: Routledge, 1998). The book contained the work of a study group of New School students, testing the empirical validity of the approach, by examining the time series of prices, wages, employment, output and productivity in six countries. About the same time Nell wrote a book in 1996 (Making Sense of a Changing Economy, London: Routledge, 1996) and laying out the 'paradoxes of individualism', and providing both a critique of the social philosophy of individualism and suggestions for a more satisfactory approach.

The shift from Craft to Mass Production leads to new policy requirements; it calls for what Abba Lerner called 'Functional Finance', but this approach fell out of favor during the difficult times following the oil shocks. There was a widespread, if temporary, experiment with monetarism, and a lasting disillusionment with 'fine tuning' and demand management. But the basics of functional finance are sound, and reflect understanding of modern (fiat and credit-based) money, money which has no 'anchor'. Reviving this approach today leads to the program for an "employer of last resort", (ELR). This offers a policy framework that will support full employment, while constraining inflation. It offers an opportunity to fulfill many social objectives as well. And it takes advantage of transformational growth, which changes the Federal budget from neutral or pro-cyclical to counter-cyclical.

A further implication of transformational growth is that if there is substantial mobility of labor and capital, exchange rates will deviate from purchasing power parity only because of speculative pressures. In other words, a universal currency, such as that proposed by Robert Mundell, would not only be desirable, it would appear to be a natural culmination of the processes of transformational growth.

=== Econometrics and philosophy ===
More recently Nell has worked with his colleague Karim Errouaki on the methodological foundations of structural econometrics. The position exposed by Martin Hollis and E.J Nell (1975)'s Rational Economic Man was further extended and developed in their recent book Rational Econometric Man, Edward Elgar, 2013). They argued that is not too farfetched to see Hollis and Nell (1975) Rational Economic Man as a foundation for reconstructing the scientific foundations of structural econometrics; one might say Rational Econometric Man. They argued that there are good reasons for considering Hollis and Nell's (1975) framework as a foundation for reconstructing structural econometrics, a foundation that complements and extends the original ideas of Trygve Haavelmo. Haavelmo's (1944) work is probably the most important landmark in the history of econometric modelling. It is a remarkable monograph which, unfortunately for econometrics, became a classic much too early, part of the reason it is misunderstood. A foundation that complements and extends the original ideas of Haavelmo. Haavelmo's (1944) work is probably the most important landmark in the history of econometric modelling. It is a remarkable monograph which, unfortunately for econometrics, became a classic much too early, part of the reason it is misunderstood. They present their distinctive methodological contribution as a blend of fieldwork and conceptual analysis designed to ensure that their models are well grounded in reality and at the same time, conceptually coherent as well as statistically adequate. In so doing, they also outline a number of elements that will be needed to develop a 'good' macro-econometric model of an advanced economy.

=== Development economics ===
More recently, Nell has worked with his two colleagues Federico Mayor Zaragoza and Karim Errouaki on Reinventing Globalization after the Crash (forthcoming in 2015). The book is based on material provided by Federico Mayor Zaragoza's book The World Ahead (Zed Books, UNESCO, 2001), revisited and animated by the theoretical framework put forward by Nell in his opus magnum book General Theory of Transformational Growth (Cambridge University Press, 1998) and extended by Karim Errouaki (UM, HEC-Montreal, 2003) who argued that Transformational Growth provides a new vision and a new framework, for thinking about economic development, bringing it into the framework of economic history. The purpose of the book, which is embodied in their title, is to re-invent globalization in a way that it will ensure that globalization is only profitable and sustainable – the subject of many studies – but it will result in human development. They want to suggest ways to recreate global economy as to humanize it.

=== Other books ===
- Rational Economic Man (with Martin Hollis), Cambridge: Cambridge University Press, 1975. (Portuguese edition, O Homem Economico Rational, trans. by A. Addor, Zahar, Rio, 1977. Japanese edition 1982).
- Growth, Profits and Property, edited by E.J. Nell, Cambridge: Cambridge University Press, 1980.
- Demanda Effectiva, Precios y Salarios, (edited and translated by A.Schneider), Mexico: Editorial Trillas, Mexico, 1983.
- Historia y Teoria Economica, edited by A. Barcelo y Lluis Argemi, Barcelona, Spain: Editorial Critica, Grijalbo, 1984.
- Free Market Conservatism: A Critique of Theory and Practice, London, UK: George Allen and Unwin, 1984.
- Prosperity and Public Spending: Transformational Growth and the Role of the State, London, UK: Unwin and Hyman, 1988.
- Nicholas Kaldor and Mainstream Economics: Confrontation and Convergence, edited with Willi Semmler, Essays from the Kaldor Conference, London, UK: Macmillan, 1991.
- Transformational Growth and Effective Demand, London, UK: Macmillan, 1992.
- Beyond the Steady State: Essays in the Revival of Growth Theory, edited with Joseph Halevi and David Laibman, London, UK: Macmillan, 1992.
- Economics as Worldly Philosophy: Essays in Honor of Robert Heilbroner, edited with Jaspal Chatha and Ron Blackwell, London, UK: Macmillan, 1992.
- Money in Motion, edited with Ghislain Deleplace, London, UK: Macmillan, 1995.
- Making Sense of a Changing Economy. Routledge: London and New York, 1996.
- The General Theory of Transformational Growth: Keynes After Sraffa. Cambridge University Press, 1998.
- Transformational Growth and the Business Cycle, London,. Routledge, 1998.
- Reinventing Functional Finance, ed w. M. Forstater; Cheltenham: Edward Elgar, 2003.
- The State The Market and the Euro, E.Elgar, 2003.
- Rational Economic Man (with Martin Hollis), Cambridge: Cambridge University Press, second edition, 2006.
- Rational Econometric Man: Transforming Structural Econometrics, with Karim Errouaki; E. Elgar, 2013.
- Reinventing Globalization after the Crash, with Federico Mayor Zaragoza and Karim Errouaki, forthcoming in 2015.
- Hard Drugs and Easy Money, with Karim Errouaki (with the assistance of M. Nell), forthcoming in 2015.
- Leviathan's Wallet, with Ray Majewski (with the assistance of Jacob Nell), forthcoming.
- Iraq, Oil and the World Economy with Willi Semmler, forthcoming.
- Towards a New Paradigm in Development Economics, with Karim Errouaki, forthcoming.
- Le Statut Scientifique de la Méthodologie Econométrique, with Karim Errouaki, forthcoming.
- Economics and Management in Dialogue: Reinventing Management (Organizational Strategies through the Transformational Growth Lens), with Karim Errouaki, and Federico Mayor Zaragoza, forthcoming.
- The General Theory of Transformational Growth, second edition, forthcoming.
- Rationality, Action and Value in the Philosophy of Social Science, Martin Hollis Memorial Conference, edited with Brendan Hogan and Karim Errouaki, forthcoming.

=== Articles ===
Over 150 articles in professional economics journals and edited volumes; 6 articles in professional philosophy journals; numerous articles in popular magazines, and numerous TV interviews.

=== Selected articles ===
- Nell, E.J. (1966) "No Proposition can describe itself". Analysis. Vol.26, No. 4. March 1966.
- Nell, E.J. (1967) "Wicksell's Theory of Circulation". The Journal of Political Economy. Vol. 75, No. 4, Part I, August 1967.
- Nell, E. J. (1967) "Theories of Growth and Theories of Value," Economic Development and Cultural Change, Vol. 16, No. 1 (December 1967).
- Nell, E.J. (1970) "A Note on Cambridge Controversies In Capital Theory". The Journal of Economic Literature. Volume VIII, Number 1, March 1970
- Nell, E.J. (1972) "The Revival of Political Economy". Social Research. Spring 1972 (Vol. 39. No. 1)
- Nell, E.J. (1973) "Cyclical Accumulation: A Marxian Model of Development". The American Economic Review. Volume I.XIII, Number 2. May 1973.
- Nell, E.J. (1973) "The Fall of the House of Efficiency". The Annals of The American Academy of Political and Social Science. Special Issue on Income Inequality. Volume 409. September 1973.
- Edward J. Nell (1976) "An Alternative Presentation of Lowe's basic Model". In Adolph Lowe (1976), The Path of Economic Growth. Cambridge: Cambridge University Press. pp. 289–329.
- Nell, E. J. (1977) "No Statement Is Immune to Revision." Social Research, Vol. 44, n4 (Winter 1977): 801–23.
- Nell, E. J. and Laibman, D. (1977) "Reswitching, Wicksell Effects, and the Neoclassical Production Function," American Economic Review, Vol. 67, n5 (Dec. 1977): 878–88.
- Nell, E.J (1984) "Structure and Behavior in Classical and Neo-Classical Theory". Eastern Economic Journal, Vol. XI, No. 2, April–June 1984.
- Nell, E.J. (1986) "On Monetary Circulation and the Rate of Exploitation", Thames Papers in Political Economy, Summer.
- Nell, E. J. (1989) "Notes on Finance, Risk and Investment Spending," in Barrere, A. (ed.), Money, credit and prices in Keynesian perspective: Proceedings of a conference held at the University of Paris I--Pantheon-Sorbonne. New York: St. Martin's Press, (1989): 16–47.
- Nell, E. J. (1989) "Accumulation and Capital Theory", in Feiwel, G. (ed.), Joan Robinson and Modern Economics., New York: New York University Press.
- Nell, E.J. (1990) "Velocity of Circulation and the Mark-Up", Economie Appliquée, Summer.
- Nell, E. J. (1994) "Instrumentalism" and the Role of the State," Economie Appliquée Vol. 47, n2 (1994): 81–113.
- Nell, E.J. (1994) "Minsky, Keynes and Sraffa: Investment and the Long Period" in G. Dymski and R. Pollin (Eds), New Perspectives on Monetary Macroeconomics. Ann Arbor: University of Michigan Press.
- Nell, E.J. and Phillips, Th. F. (1995) "Transformational Growth And The Business Cycle". Eastern Economic Journal, Vol. 21, No. 2, Spring 1995.
- Nell, E. J. (1996) "Transformational Growth and the Long-Period Method," Review of Political Economy, Vol. 8, No. 4 (October 1996): 379–401.
- Nell, E. J. (1998) "Price Theory and Macroeconomics: Stylized Facts and New Keynesian Fantasies", in Roy Rotheim, R. (ed.)., New Keynesian Economics/ Post Keynesianism Alternatives, New York and London: Routledge, pp. 71–105, 1998
- Nell, E. J. (1998) "Stages in the Development of the Business Cycle", in Hagemann, H. and Kurz, H. D. Political Economics in Retrospect: Essays in memory of Adolph Lowe, Edward Elgar, 1998, pp. 131–55.
- Nell, E. J. (1998) "Limiti di Comprensione: La Trasformazione della Crescita e il Ruolo dello Stato", in Graziani, A. and Nassisi, A. M. L'Economia Mondiale in Transformaziona. Manifestolibri srl, 1998, pp. 193–227.
- Nell, E.J. (1999) "Wicksell After Sraffa: 'Capital Arbitrage' and 'Normal" Rate of Growth, Interest and Profits," in Mongiovi, G. and F. Petri, editors, Value, Distribution and Capital: Essays in honour of Pierangelo Garegnani. London: Routledge. Ch.13 (pp. 266–93).
- Nell, E. J. (1999) "Discussion – Financial Markets and Excess Capital Flows in Asia", Global Financial Turmoil and Reform, Herman, B. (ed.), United Nations University Press, 1999, pp. 448–53
- Nell, E.J. (2001) "Notes on Hicks on Money and Monetary Theory", in L.P. Rochon and M. Vernengo, editors, Credit, Interest Rates and the Open Economy: Essays on horizontalism. Cheltenham, UK: Elgar.
- Nell, E. J. (2002) "Crecimiento Transformativo e Inestabilidad Financiera. Tensions entre el Tipo de Interés y la Tasa de Crecimiento." Oscar de Juan and Eladio Febrero (eds.). La Fragilidad Financiera del Capitalismo. Ediciones de la Universidad de Castilla-La Mancha, Cuenca, 2002.
- Nell, E.J. (2002) "On Realizing Profits in Money", Review of Radical Political Economy, Vol. 14 (4), pp. 519–30.
- Nell, E.J. (2003) "Nominal Money, Real Money and Stabilization", in S. Bell and E.J. Nell, editors, The State, the Market and the Euro: Chartalism verus Metallism in the theory of money. Cheltenham, UK: Elgar.
- Nell, E. J. and Semmler, W. (2003) “The Economic Consequences of the Peace in Iraq". Constellations, Summer, 2003.
- Nell, E. J., Federico Mayor Zaragoza and Errouaki, K. (2006) Preface. Democratizar la Globalizacion. Boutros Boutros Ghali.Universidad del Valle. Artes Graficas del Valle Ltda. Colombia.
- Nell, E.J. (2004) "Monetising the Classical Equations: A Theory of Circulation" Cambridge Journal of Economics. 28(2), 2004.
- Nell, E.J (2004) "Critical Realism and Transformational Growth". In Transforming Economics. Edited by P. Lewis. London: Routledge. 76–95.
- Nell, E. J. (2004) "Hiring Invisible Hands for Public Works", in B. Hodgson, ed., The Invisible Hand and the Common Good, Springer-Verlag, 2004
- Nell, E. J. (2004) "Economic Causes of the Rise of Fundamentalism" in M. Achaari, The Dialogue of Cultures: Is it Possible?, Royal Academy of Morocco, 2004
- Nell, E. J. and Errouaki, K. (2006) Preface. Le Management entre Tradition et Renouvellement. Omar Aktouf. Montreal: Gaetin Morin.Fourth Edition.
- Nell, E. J. and Semmler, W. (2007) "The Iraq War and the World Oil Economy". Constellations. Volume 14, No. 4, December 2007
- Nell, E. J. (2008) "Aggregate Demand, Employment and Equilibrium with Marginal Productivity: Keynesian Adjustment in the Craft Economy." METU Studies in Development. Volume 35, No. 1, June 2008. Middle East Technical University, Faculty of Economic and Administrative Sciences.
- Nell, E. J. and Semmler, W. (2009) "Financial Crisis, Real Crisis and Policy Alternatives". Constellations. Volume 16, No. 2, June 2009.
- Nell, E.J. (2009) "On the History of Economic Theory and the Emergence of Capitalism", History of Economic Thought and Economic History, Economic History Year Book. Jahrbuch Fur Wirtschaftsgeschichte, Akademie Verlag.2009/1. Berlin, Germany.
- Nell, E.J and Gualerzi, D. (2010) "Where are the New Markets?", Challenge, March–April, 2010, pp. 30–46.
- Nell, E.J and Gualerzi, D. (2010) "Transformational Growth in the 1990s: Government, Finance and Hi-tech", Review of Political Economy. Vol. 22, No. 1, January, 2010, pp. 97–117.
- Nell, E.J and Gualerzi, D. (2011) "The Crisis, Long Term Depression and New Markets" International Journal of Management Concepts and Philosophy.
- Nell, E.J., Kinsella, S, and Greiff, M.(2011) `Income Distribution in a Stock-Flow-Consistent Model with Education and Technological Change', Eastern Economic Journal, 37, 134–149.
