= Edward Malefakis =

American history professor

Edward E. Malefakis (January 2, 1932 – August 22, 2016) was an American history professor at Columbia University. He was an expert in Spanish history.

The winner of the American Historical Association's Herbert Baxter Adams Prize in 1971 for his work Agrarian Reform and Peasant Revolution in Spain, Origins of the Civil War (Yale U.P.), he was a member of the panel of experts, along with Federico Mayor Zaragoza and Juan Pablo Fusi, among others, commissioned in 2004 by the government of Spain to advise over the notorious "Salamanca Papers".
