= Kōichirō Matsuura =

Japanese diplomat

- 松浦 晃一郎
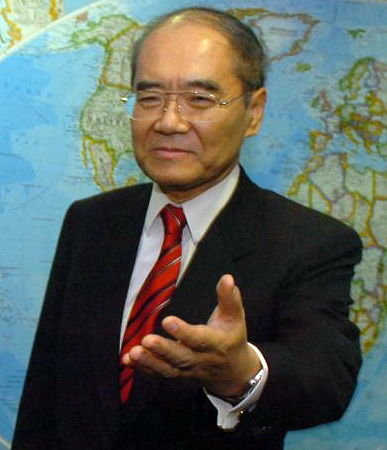
- Matsuura in 2007

8th Director-General of UNESCO
- In office 1999–2009
- Preceded by: Federico Mayor Zaragoza
- Succeeded by: Irina Bokova

Personal details
- Born: 29 September 1937 (age 88) Yamaguchi Prefecture, Japan
- Occupation: Diplomat
- Website: UN profile

Kōichirō Matsuura (松浦 晃一郎, Matsūra Kōichirō; born 29 September 1937) is a Japanese diplomat. He is the former Director-General of UNESCO. He was first elected in 1999 to a six-year term and reelected on 12 October 2005 for four years, following a reform instituted by the 29th session of the General Conference. In November 2009, he was replaced by Irina Bokova.

He studied law at the University of Tokyo and economics at Haverford College (Pennsylvania, USA) and began his diplomatic career in 1959. Posts held by Mr Matsuura include those of Director-General of the Economic Co-operation Bureau of Japan’s Ministry of Foreign Affairs (1988); Director-General of the North American Affairs Bureau, Ministry of Foreign Affairs (1990); and Deputy Minister for Foreign Affairs (1992–1994). He was Japan’s Ambassador to France from 1994 to 1999. After one year as the Chairperson of UNESCO’s World Heritage Committee, he became UNESCO’s ninth Director-General on 12 November 1999.

== Professional ==
- 1961–1963: Third Secretary of the Embassy of Japan, Ghana; also accredited to other countries in West Africa
- 1963–1968: Assumed various posts at the central administration, Ministry of Foreign Affairs
- 1968–1972: Second Secretary, then First Secretary of the Japanese Delegation to the OECD, Paris
- 1972–1974: Assumed various posts at the central administration, Ministry of Foreign Affairs
- 1974–1975: Director of the First North American Division (Political Affairs), Ministry of Foreign Affairs
- 1975–1977: Director of the Development Cooperation Division, Ministry of Foreign Affairs
- 1977–1980: Counsellor of the Embassy of Japan, United States of America
- 1980–1982: Director of the Aid Policy Division, Ministry of Foreign Affairs
- 1982–1985: Successively Director of the General Affairs Division and Deputy Director-General of the Foreign Minister’s Office
- 1985–1988: Consul General of Japan in Hong Kong
- 1988–1990: Director-General, Economic Cooperation Bureau, Ministry of Foreign Affairs
- 1990–1992: Director-General, North American Affairs Bureau, Ministry of Foreign Affairs
- 1992–1994: Deputy Minister for Foreign Affairs (Sherpa for Japan at the G-7 Summit)
- 1994–1999: Ambassador of Japan to France and concurrently to Andorra and Djibouti
- 1998–1999: Chairperson, World Heritage Committee of UNESCO
- 1999–2009: UNESCO Director-General (elected to a six-year term on 15 November 1999; re-elected in 2005)

== Academic ==
- 1956–1959: Faculty of Law, University of Tokyo
- 1959–1961: Faculty of Economics, Haverford College, USA
- 1997: Doctor of Laws (Honoris Causa), Jean Moulin University Lyon III
- 2006: Doctor of Laws (Honoris Causa), University of Santo Tomas, Philippines
- 2008: Doctor of Philosophy (Honoris Causa), Kyung Hee University, Republic of Korea

== Honours ==
- Azerbaijan: Medal of the Shohrat Order
- Bulgaria : First Class of the Order of the Balkan Mountains
- Costa Rica : Grand Cross of the Order of Juan Mora Fernández
- France: Grand Officer of the Legion of Honour
- Hungary: Commander's Cross with Star of the Hungarian Order of Merit
- Japan: First Class of the Order of the Sacred Treasure
- Kyrgyzstan: Medal of the Order of Danaker
- Lithuania: Grand Cross of the Order of the Lithuanian Grand Duke Gediminas
- Norway: Grand Cross of the Order of St. Olav
- Peru: Grand Cross of the Order of the Sun of Peru
- Portugal: Grand Cross of the Order of Prince Henry
- Romania: Grand Cross of the National Order of Faithful Service
- Russia: Medal of the Order of Friendship
- Russia: Medal of the Order of the Polar Star
- Ukraine: Second Class of the Order of Prince Yaroslav the Wise

== Publications ==
- 1990: In the Forefront of Economic Cooperation Diplomacy (in Japanese)
- 1992: History of Japan-United States Relations (in Japanese)
- 1994: The G-7 Summit: Its History and Perspectives (in Japanese)
- 1995: Development & Perspectives of the Relations between Japan and France (in French)
- 1998: Japanese Diplomacy at the Dawn of the 21st Century (in French)
- 2002: A year of Transition (in English & French)
- 2003: Building the New UNESCO (in English & French)
- 2004: Responding to the Challenges of the 21st Century (in English & French)

== Notes ==
Government offices
Preceded by Federico Mayor Zaragoza	Director-General of UNESCO; 1999 – 2009	Succeeded by Irina Bokova
