= John Brademas Center for the Study of Congress =

The John Brademas Center for the Study of Congress at the Robert F. Wagner Graduate School of Public Service is a center at New York University focused on the role of Congress with regard to U.S. policy-making. The center is supported by a grant directed by the U.S. Congress as well as private donations.

== Mission ==
The mission of the John Brademas Center for the Study of Congress is to increase the understanding of Congress—“the People’s Branch” of government— its role in making policy; its powers, processes and responsibilities. The Center’s bi-partisan work is aimed at scholars, students, current and future public servants and the public. The Center conducts research, teaches and holds public outreach events—such as symposia and conferences—and hosts policy addresses by members of Congress. Its programming aims to explore issues and problems of the legislative branch from new perspectives. As a part of the New York University’s Robert F. Wagner Graduate School of Public Service, the Center seeks to help the next generation of public service leaders develop a deeper understanding of how and why Congress makes decisions. The Center is named for founder John Brademas, who served in the U.S. House for 22 years (1959–81).

== Advisory Council ==
- Mickey Edwards: former Member of the U.S. House of Representatives (R-OK); director, Aspen Institute-Rodel Fellowships in Public Leadership, The Aspen Institute, Washington, D.C.
- Geraldine A. Ferraro: former Member of the U.S. House of Representatives (D-NY); 1984 vice presidential nominee; Executive Vice President and Head of the Public Affairs Practice, The Global Consulting Group
- Lee H. Hamilton: former Member of the U.S. House of Representatives (D-IN); President & Director of Woodrow Wilson International Center for Scholars, Washington, D.C.
- Trent Lott: former Member of the U.S. Senate (R-MS)
- Leon Panetta: former Member of the U.S. House of Representatives (D-CA); director, Panetta Institute, California State University
- Charles B. Rangel: Member of the U.S. House of Representatives (D-NY)
- Paul S. Sarbanes: former Member of the U.S. Senate (D-MD)
- Philip R. Sharp: former Member of the U.S. House of Representatives (D-IN); president, Resources for the Future
- Christopher Shays: Member of the U.S. House of Representatives (R-CT)
- Olympia Snowe: Member of the U.S. Senate (R-ME)
- Thomas Bender: University Professor of the Humanities and Professor of History, director, International Center for Advanced Studies, NYU
- Nigel Bowles: CUF Lecturer in Politics and Balfour Fellow in Politics, St Anne's College, University of Oxford
- Alan Brinkley: Provost and Allan Nevins Professor of History, Columbia University
- Douglas Brinkley: Distinguished Professor of History, director, The Theodore Roosevelt Center for American Civilization, Tulane University
- George W. Downs, Jr.: dean for the Social Sciences, NYU
- Elizabeth Drew: author and journalist
- Richard F. Fenno, Jr.: William R. Kenan, Jr. Professor Emeritus of Political Science, University of Rochester
- Alton Frye: Presidential Senior Fellow emeritus, Council on Foreign Relations
- Thomas E. Mann: Senior Fellow, Governance Studies and W. Averell Harriman Chair Brookings Institution
- David Mayhew: Sterling Professor of Political Science, Yale University
- Norman J. Ornstein: Resident Scholar, American Enterprise Institute
- Ronald M. Peters, Jr.: Regents' Professor and former director, The Carl Albert Congressional Research and Studies Center, University of Oklahoma
- Catharine R. Stimpson: dean, Graduate School of Arts and Sciences, NYU
- Julian E. Zelizer: Professor of history, Boston University
