= Jean-Claude Mocik =

French film director (born 1958)

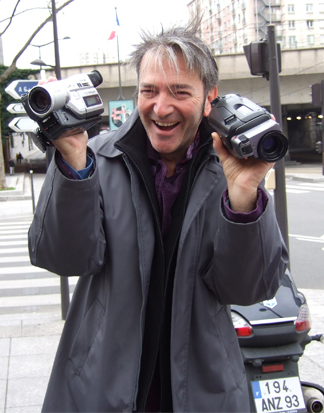
- Jean-Claude Mocik in 2012
- Born: Jean-Claude Mocik; 9 February 1958; Livry Gargan, France
- Known for: Director

Jean-Claude Mocik, was born on February 9, 1958, in Livry Gargan. He is a filmmaker, video director, a director and teacher.

== Chronology ==
After studies of cinema and broadcasting in Paris VIII University, Jean-Claude Mocik worked with Pierre Jolivet : Strictement personnel (1985), Le complexe du kangourou (1986) and Jean-Pierre Mocky : Le Pactole (1985), La machine à découdre (1986). Then he became assistant-director of Jean-Paul Jaud : SOS Charlot (1983), La Marseillaise (1989). He realized fictions : Piste (1980), Moco Fictions(2007), documentaries : Théatre, Ecole Créativité (1982) and Looking For Beethoven (2012), experimental films : Paris Figure Simple (1986) and Nyc Nac Solo (1989) and videos : Correspondance avec Jean-Luc Godard (1985) and Laos Noblabla (2011). At the same time, he developed visual prototypes such as Switcher Video Band. From 1985, he is particularly drawn to new technologies. He joined the Ars Technica Association connected to the Cité des Sciences et de l'Industrie uniting philosophers, artists, scientists such as Piotr Kowalski, Jean-Marc Levy-Leblond, Claude Faure, Jean-Max Albert, Sara Holt, Piero Gilardi, reflecting on the relationship between art and new technologies. In 1989, Dominique Noguez recommended him for the 1st Biennial of Contemporary Art of Barcelona. He showed a video installation in 12 TV monitors arranged in pyramid. In the 90s, he was considered one of the precursors of HDTV beside Jean-Christophe Averty, David Niles, Zbigniew Rybczynski, Jacques Barsac, Pierre Trividic, Hervé Nisic. He produced and realized experimental programs such as Dix-neuvième for Canal+. In 1991, uniting his activities of R&D in audiovisual media conception, he created jcMCK, his own production company. In 1992, the Centre national d’art et de culture Georges-Pompidou showed his experimental movies and videos at the Cinéma du Musée curated by Jean-Michel Bouhours. Beside Catherine Desrosiers, Catherine Beuve-Mery and Maurice Séveno, Jean-Claude Mocik participated in the CICV of Belfort Montbéliard, with the conception of an interactive TV program. In December, 1993, at the request of the 35mm laboratory Les 3 Lumières, he inaugurated Switcher Vidéo Band, an experimental multicameras captation in Le Palace, Paris. In 1994, he left one of the main cooperatives of experimental films in Paris, Light Cône, and made the decision to broadcast his experimental movies and video tapes exclusively thru his personal workshop. Recommended by Olivier Bontemps and Christophe Valdejo, two art directors of Gédéon and founders of the agency View, the Italian photographer Oliviero Toscani offered him, in 1995, the management of the department Cinéma-Vidéo of Fabrica, the Research center on the Communication of Benetton, based near Venice. In November, 1996, Fabrice Michel and Alain Josseau invited him to Toulouse to conceive and present a video installation entitled Video Solo in reference to his movie Nyc Nac Solo, shot in 1989 in New-York. L’Atelier de Recherche d’Arte regularly broadcasts his films and vidéos. As a TV director, Jean-Claude Mocik collaborated on numerous programs broadcast on diverse TV channels: Paristroïka, produced and broadcast by MCM Euromusique, Tout Paris for Paris-Première, L’Atelier 246 for FR3, Court Circuit, produced by MK2 broadcast by Arte. He created concepts of documentary series of which Le Travail en questions, a collection of 10 × 52 min animated by Ariel Wizman and Francis von Litsenborgh, were broadcast on La Cinquième. Since 2006, he is in charge of an educational department of Conception, Writing and Directing within the Pole of Education and Research of INA. In 2007, he wrote the screenplay and directed Moco Fictions a visual film essay completely shot with a robot. In 2013, he filmed in Vienna, Austria, Looking For Beethoven, a documentary film on Belcea Quartet for TV Mezzo and for a German music channel Unitel Classica. In February, 2014, at the request of Paul Ouazan, he contributed to a project entitled Le marcheur, broadcast on Arte Creative.

=== Research ===
Very early, Jean-Caude Mocik identifies himself in filmmaking as a "rhythmmaker" director. If scenes and sequences are generally imposed by the scenario and its narration, rhythmmaker or metric cinema assumes to be indifferent to subject and story. Images and sounds are detached from any production of meaning; they are exclusively dedicated to a rhythmic layout where visual and sound elements are used as material for durations, rates, frequencies, times and cycles. A process is established with the aim of collecting visual dynamics in a structured composition. From shooting to editing, all cinematographic resources are considered a priori sources of rhythm: axes and camera movements, lenses, editing, are thus subject to constraint through a rhythmic system (similar to music, metric or not), which offers unusual compositions on screen. Framings or pans, which are usually led by the movement of a character, are pre-set here: regardless of whether this character stays in the frame or not.

=== Experiments ===
His work as a rhythmmaker artist implies progressing over very long periods, like daily shots with a film camera for over 30 years, (Séries circadienne) or using 2 video cameras, shooting every two weeks at noon sharp, in the imposed itinerary at the gates of Paris, (Midi pile). These projects, initiated in January 1994, continue today. Once a month in his workshop, projections that are held. His experimentations delve into his personal archives of films and videos, stored over time, in order to compose visual and sound arrangements specific to each session. The result is a kind of palimpsest in permanent mutation. The projection itself becomes form.

== Filmography ==
=== Films ===
- Piste, 13 min, 16mm optical sound, 1981
- Orbite, 2 min, 16mm silent, 1983
- Malaxer, 4 min, 16mm magnetic, 1983
- Paillex-Bolard, 6 min, 16mm silent, 1983
- Ciné-spot, 6 min, 16mm silent, 1983
- 44 rue Petits Plaisirs, 6 min, 16mm magnetic, 1983
- Lignes, 13 min, 16 magnetic, 1985
- Paris Figure Simple, 66 min, 16mm magnetic, 1986
- Roma Amor, 6 min, 35mm silent, 1986
- Nyc Nac Solo, 60 min, 16mm magnetic, 1989
- 33, 20 min, 16mm magnetic,1991
- Si Film Dada, 6 min, 16mm silent,1991
- 34, les ciels, 1 min, 35mm silent, 1992
- Los Angelos, 13 min, 16mm magnetic, 1992
- Paris Solo version Sinistrée, 60 min, HDTV, 1995
- Paris Solo version Dix sur Dix, 60 min, HDTV, 1997
- Série circadienne — années 33 à 50, 16 et 35mm, digital, 1991-2008
- Série circadienne — années 51 à 57, 35mm silent, digital, 2008-2015

=== Video ===
- Répétitions, 20 min, 3/4 U-matic, 1983
- Correspondence avec Jean-Luc Godard, 20 min, 3/4 U-matic, 1985
- Attractions 1st version, 8 min, Beta Standard, 1988
- Lunéville version Pigalle, 7 min, Beta SP, 1990
- Dix-neuvième, 7 min, TV HD, Canal +, 1990
- Double Landscape, 30 min, Beta SP, 1994
- Coupes du Monde, 45 min, DVCam, 1998
- Midi Pile, arc Villette Pantin, 13 min, DVCam, 1994-2005
- Morocco, 4 min, DVCam, 2006
- Moco Fictions, 1h30, DVCam, 2007
- Laos Noblabla, 4 min 20, HDTV, 2011

=== TV ===
- Paristroïka, weekly TV show, 70 × 26 min, MCM-Euromusique
- Nature, documentary, 26 min, LMK - BBC
- Regarde le monde, dayly TV Show, 26 min, SIIS - Canal J
- L’atelier 256, serie of segment, Gédéon - FR3
- Tout Paris, dayly TV Show, 26 min, Paris Première
- Hexagone, weekly TV Show, 60 min, SIIS -TV 5
- Télé TV, dayly TV Show anchored by Stéphane Paoli, Ellipse Programme - TMC
- City-Life, HDTV documentary (2 × 52 min) about Steve Reich, jcMCK - MCM International
- Épinay Sur Seine, TVHD captation rock music, jcMCK - MCM International
- Tour de Chauffe, weekly TV Show, Multithématiques - TMC
- Les clés de la nature, weekly TV Show, Télé-Images - La Cinquième
- Poulidor en jaune, documentary, 18 min, Point du Jour - Arte
- Fictions, shorts, advertising, segments for Fabrica, Italia, Arte, MCM, Canale 5, MTV
- Le travail en questions, serie, 10 × 52 min documentary, Point du Jour - Ministère du Travail et des Affaires Sociales - La Cinquième
- Serial killers, Doc en stock -13e Rue
- La Route, weekly talk-show, Starling - Canal Jimmy, Sept d'Or in 2000
- Paris Mode, Special TV show, Olivier Theyskens, MCM Paris - Paris Première
- Court-Circuit, weekly, MK2 TV - Arte
- Rosalie et les collectionneurs, weekly, Ad Stellas - Louvain Production - TMC
- multicaméras directings on streaming, SmallBang, Mediapart
- Looking for Beethoven, documentary, 52 min, Heliox - Unitel Classica / Mezzo

=== Exhibitions, installations, performances ===
- Circulations, video installation, 1st Biennale de Barcelone, 1989
- L'art au défi des technosciences ? collective exhibition, Pavillon Tusquet, Parc de la Villette, Paris, 1992
- Ici et Là, installation for 2 movie projectors, Champigny sur Marne, 1994, June 10 to 19
- Le Switcher Video Band, multicameras performance, Les 3 Lumières, Palace, Paris, 1993
- Eaux d'Artifices, performance movie installation, Château de Courances, June 25, 1994
- Sans titre, movie and video installation, CAES Ris-Orangis, 1994
- Le vrai du Faux, movie and installation, CAES Ris-Orangis, May 13 and 14, 1995
- Vidéo Solo, 20 TV monitors video installation, Toulouse 1996
- Paris Pong, installation interactive de Djeff, Festival Emergences, Paris-Villette, 2006
- Movimento Urbani, video performance, Vittorio Veneto, Italie, November, December 2009
- En angle côté miroir, video installation, Saturday 18 June 1991
- Midi Pile, video performance, 2 × light video caméra, Paris, 1994-2022
- Midi Pile Selon 3, video installation, 23 x video monitors, Paris, 2020

=== Projections and broadcasting of experimental films and videos ===
- Orbite, Malaxer, Ciné spot, Année 80, Nouvelle Génération - Cinéma du Musée, cnam - Centre Pompidou,1984
- Lignes, FIAG - Olympic Entrepôt,1986
- Attractions, Éthique & Télévision, Montbéliard, September 1988
- Attractions, 1st version, Festival Vidéo Art Plastique, Hérouville-Saint-Clair, 1988
- Gare du Rex, Les aprèms à Toto, Rex-Club, Paris, December 1988
- Lignes, Paris Figure Simple, Scratch Projection, Olympic Entrepôt, Tuesday December 6, 1988
- Paris Figure Simple, Ciné-Club de Saint-Charles, Université de Paris 1 - Panthéon - Sorbonne, Wednesday 23 November 1988
- Paris Figure Simple, V.L.A. vers le livre d'artiste, Bordeaux, January 13, 1989
- Paris Figure Simple, Archives du film expérimental Avignon, Saturday February 24, 1989
- Attractions, 1re version, Festival VIDEO CREATION, Montpellier, 1989
- 44, Rue Petit, Paris Figure simple, The Millenium, New-York, May 19, 1989.
- Nyc Nac Solo, Cinémathèque française de Chaillot, Paris, Friday February 7, 1990
- Paris Figure Simple, Scratch Projection, Olympic Entrepôt, Tuesday March 27, 1990
- Nyc Nac Solo, XXe Festival International de Musique Expérimentale, Bourges, from June 6 to 16, 1990
- Nyc Nac Solo, Scratch Projection, Olympic Entrepôt, Tuesday October 16, 1990
- Nyc Nac Solo, Archives du film expérimental Avignon, Saturday, November 17, 1990
- Dix-Neuvième, Vidéothèque de Paris, Paris, Monday December 17, 1990
- On/off, portrait d'un sculpteur, Festival Vidéo Art Plastique, Hérouville-Saint-Clair, 1990
- Dix-Neuvième, 2nd Festival International de Vidéo, Vigo, Espagne, January 1991
- Paris Figure Simple, Anthology Gallery of Ontario (AGO), Toronto, Friday February 22, 1991
- Paris Figure Simple, Cinémathèque québécoise, Montreal, Quebec, Canada, Tuesday March 15, 1991
- Rétrospective des films et vidéos, Cinéma du Musée, cnam - Centre Georges Pompidou, from February 12 to 16, 1992
- Jeune, Dure et Pure ! Une histoire du cinéma d'avant-garde et expérimental en France, Programme 71, Cinémathèque française, May /June, 2000
