= Piero Gilardi =

Italian artist (1942–2023)

Piero Gilardi sitting on one of his sculptures at the École des Beaux-Arts in Paris

Piero Gilardi (3 August 1942 – 5 March 2023) was a visual artist, theorist, art organizer and a catalytic figure in the Arte Povera movement as concentrated in Turin in the late 1960s.

Born in Italy to a Swiss family, he studied at the Liceo Artistico in Turin. In an interview with LeGrace G. Benson, Gilardi stated that his personal encounter with artist Michelangelo Pistoletto and others helped him in the development of his own artwork that developed in parallel with that of U.S.-based Pop Art and French Nouveau réalisme. While trying to comprehend the cybernetic idea of feedback and the scientific rationale behind prefrontal synthesis, his perspective on reality changed and he began to focus on the Fluxus movement and its relationship with banal things.

Gilardi's dedication to connecting neo-avant garde artists across Western Europe and North America made him one of the most influential artistic figures of the period, albeit not the most famous. Gilardi contributed to the birth of Arte Povera, especially working to establish relationships with other similar initiatives that occurred simultaneously outside Italy. Gilardi supported the work of artists such as Richard Long and Jan Dibbets and introduced the work of Bruce Nauman and Eva Hesse to Europe. Gilardi's uncompromising commitment to closer ties between art and life led him to the fields of psychiatry and anthropology. Gilardi experimented with collective forms of political theater, workshops, and activist struggles with the workers of Fiat and against the implementation of TAV (Treni Alta Velocità: High Speed Trains) in the years 1970–80. During the 2000s, Gilardi initiated the outdoor project "Park of Living Art" in Turin, that welcomed artists Dominique Gonzalez-Foerster, Gilles Clément, Almarcegui Lara, and Michel Blazy, as well as scientists. Here the public was invited to participate directly as a form of interactive art.

== Early works ==
=== 1960s ===
Gilardi was born in Turin of parents Mario Gilardi and Cecilia Lavelli. In 1963 he made his debut with an exhibition of Neodadaist Macchine per il Futuro at Galleria L'Immagine of Turin. He gained fame with the nature Carpets in 1965: these are works made of polyurethane, which reproduce in a very realistic style fragments of natural environment for recreational purposes, but also to report to a style of life which, with the passage of time becomes more and more artificial (Greto of stream, Gallery of Modern Art, Cagliari). These rugs were exposed to Hamburg, Amsterdam, Brussels, Cologne, Milan, New York City, and Paris. From 1968 Gilardi stopped the production of works to participate in the theoretical development of new artistic trends: Arte Povera, Land Art and Antiform, participating in the years 1967 – 1968 as a contributor to the realization of the first two international shows of the new trend of Stedelijk Museum Amsterdam such as at the Kunsthalle in Bern, Switzerland. The Stedelijk Museum displays date, in the section dedicated to the history of the museum, part of the correspondence between Gilardi and Wim Beeren, one of the curators of the museum.

From 1968 and for all the 1970s his artistic activity was accompanied by the formation of political activism in the so-called New Left (or far left), covering the artistic movements of collective creativity and the spontaneous, and he worked in various social environments, which offered themselves as contributions to the animation's cultural base. Creative experiences not only in Italy but also in Nicaragua, various countries in Africa, and in the territories of Native Americans in the United States of America contributed to the efforts as well.

=== 1970s ===
Gilardi was involved in creating social relations through art. Gilardi was involved with the occurrence of collective and spontaneous creativity by working in many social contexts.

=== 1980s ===
Gilardi experimented with new technological languages and began to create a series of "virtual reality" art works. Gilardi returned to full artistic production in 1981, telling his own artistic and ideological discourse in a text entitled From art to life, from life to art, published that same year as his re-embrace of his own artistic production.

From 1985 he undertook an artistic research project with new technologies through the development of the project "IXIANA" which was presented at the Parc de la Villette in Paris, a technological park in which the general public could experience in an artistic sense, digital technologies. Later in a spurt of intense international activity he developed a series of interactive multimedia. Along with Claude Faure and Piotr Kowalski, he formed the International Association "Ars Technica", association connected to the Cité des Sciences et de l'Industrie uniting philosophers, artists, and scientists such as Jean-Marc Levy-Leblond, Jean-Louis Boissier, Jean-Max Albert, Sara Holt, and Jean-Claude Mocik who reflected on the relationship between art and new technologies.

As the head of the Italian section of Ars Technica he promoted international exhibitions in Turin, "Arslab Methods and Emotion" (1992) "Arslab, and Senses of Virtual" (1995), "Arslab, and The mazes of the body in the game (1999), and numerous opportunities for study in new media.

== After Arte Povera in Italy ==
Gilardi eventually moved away from the notions of Arte Povera and completely revamped his work (however, he still incorporated nature into his pieces). He became more involved in environmental work and focused on the importance of interaction and community in the social sphere.

Most of Gilardi's later work is united by a theme, or the interactions between work and spectator. Among the various creations "remember to install pulse", in which the heartbeat of the observer of the work – recorded by a sensor – determines changes to the whole; Absolut, forest of synthetic materials, translucent and cold shared emotion, involves two people in a performance interactive computing, referring to new approaches and exchange in society: virtual and globalized.

Gilardi devoted more than a decade to his most ambitious endeavor, the Parco Arte Vivente (Park of Living Art or PAV). A collaborative effort that grew from Gilardi's design, PAV is a monumental undertaking that transformed a disused parcel of land in the heart of Turin's working-class Lingotto district into a six-acre green space devoted to community, environmental, and artistic concerns. Commissioned earthworks by Dominique Gonzalez-Foerster and Lara Almarcegui define the site and provide an ongoing place of exploration for city residents and visitors alike.

Gilardi worked on the Living Art Park of the City of Turin from 2002 on. He was the President of the undertaking. He was an artist contributing towards the creative direction of the project.

== Artworks ==
=== Nature carpets ===
The nature carpets were created in the post-pop period of the late 1960s. These are horizontal segments of nature reproduced with foam rubber, allowing for a real tactile and bodily experience of the works. The illustrated work "Uragano" (Hurricane), made in 1989, evokes a tropical terrain – a banana grove – with the evidence of the aftermath of a storm. The nature of these "carpets" is therefore that of capturing the accidental nature and chaoticness of things, thus reminding one of the biological cycle of life/death.

=== Installations ===
Between 1988 and 2001, the artist addressed his research in the field of the new media art, initially creating interactive multimedia installations, followed by those of "virtual reality". The characteristic that this cycle of works has in common is that of involving as many people as possible in the interactive technology, highlighting the relational component in the sharing of the virtual and digital dimension. The illustrated work "Connected Es" is characterized by the offer of bodily interfacing with devices for measuring one's breathing and heart-beat, leading to an intense emotional attuning. Gilardi's technical collaborator on the piece was Ennio Bertrand.

=== Ixiana Project ===
This was a project (not achieved) of an "artistic-technological park" developed with a large group of artists and designers in the field of new media art, during the second half of the 1980s, for Parc de La Villette in Paris. The project was centered around an enormous inhabitable sculpture, containing a virtual creative path dedicated to the five senses, and representing a "giant child" stretched out lying upon a grassy field. The illustration shows a segment of the sculpture with the various "stations" of the interior path culminating in the head, the quarters for the telematic network connections.

=== Park of Living Art ===
As of 2002, a space has been opened in Turin where it is possible to create an art park. Gilardi, also based on experience accumulated in elaborating the IXIANA project, then developed a new idea coherent with the new goals of artistic research, with particular reference to Life Science Art. Before the successive elaboration on behalf of the current Planning Group, the proposal of the Eco Park of Art was presented on two levels: a higher open-air level, with a path of artistic installations on the grassy grounds and an underground level, with a series of rooms and laboratories for free expression.

== Books ==
Gilardi published two books: "Dall'arte alla vita, dalla vita all'arte" (From art to life, from life to art), (1981) "Not for Sale", (2000)

"Not for Sale" (Mazzotta, Milan 2000 and Les Presses du réel, Dijon 2003).

Gilardi also penned articles for various art magazines, including Juliet and Flash Art.

== Other ==
- Member of the Artistic Direction Committee

== Exhibitions ==
=== Solo exhibitions ===
1967 – Gallery Ileana Sonnabend, Paris.
1967 – Gallery Zwirner, Koln.
1967 – Gallery Sperone, Milan
1967 – Gallery Fischbach, New York
1991 – Gallery Sperone Westeater, New York
1998 – Gallery Massimo Minini, Brescia
1999 – Loggetta Lombardesca, Ravenna.
2006 – Civic Gallery of Modena
2009 – Semiose galerie, Paris.
2010 – leçon de choses, CCC-Centre de Création Contemporaine, Tours
2012 – Collaborative Effects, Van Abbemuseum, Eindhoven
2012 – Effetti Colaborativi, Castello de Rivoli, Turin
2013 – Collaborative Effects, Nottingham Contemporary, Nottingham

=== Group exhibitions ===
1967 – Salon de Mai, Paris
1968 – Group Exhibition, Walker Art Center, Minneapolis
1987 – "Terrae Motus" Grand Palais, Paris
1988 – Seoul Olympic Park, Seoul
1990 – "La otra scultura" Palacio de Cristallo, Madrid
1992 – "Artifices II", Paris.
1993 – "Artec 93", Nagoya.
1993 – 45th Biennial of Venice
1995 – "Multimediale 4", Karlsruhe, Germany.
1996 – "Art & Fashion", Biennial of Florence. 2000 – "Il sentimento del 2000" Triennial, Milan
2000 – "There is no spirit in painting", Le Consortium, Dijon.
2001/2- "Zero to infinity: Arte Povera 1962–1972" Tate Modern, London; Walker Art Center, Minneapolis; Museum of Contemporary Art, Los Angeles; Hirshhorn Museum and Sculpture Garden, Washington
2001 – "Arte povera oggi" (Poor Art Today) Italian Culture Institute, London.
2001 – "L'arte elettronica. Metamorfosi e metafore" (Electronic Art, metamorphosis and metaphors) Civic Gallery of Modern Art, Ferrara.
2001 – "Media Connection", Palazzo delle Esposizioni, Rome.
2001 – "Le tribù dell'arte", (Art Tribes) City Gallery of Modern Art, Rome
2002 – "Techne 02. Tra arte e tecnologia" (Between Art and Technology) Spazio Oberdan, Milan.
2003 – "Fragments d'un discours italien" Musée d'Art Moderne e Contemporain, Geneva
2003 – "Coolustre", Collection Lambert en Avignon
2003 – "Inverosimile", installation à la Biennial d'Art Contemporain de Lyon
2003 – "Flower Power" Musée d'Art Moderne, Lille
2006 – "Interdependence" City Gallery of Modena
