= Lavelli =

Lavelli is a surname. Notable people with the surname include:

- Cecilia Lavelli (1906–1998), Italian artist
- Dante Lavelli (1923–2009), American football player
- Jorge Lavelli (1932–2023), French theater and opera director
- Matteo Lavelli (born 2006), Italian footballer
- Rino Lavelli (born 1928), Italian long-distance runner
- Tony Lavelli (1926–1998), American basketball player and musician
