= Environmental sculpture =

Artform

Environmental sculpture is sculpture that creates or alters the environment for the viewer, as opposed to presenting itself figurally or monumentally before the viewer. A frequent trait of larger environmental sculptures is that one can actually enter or pass through the sculpture and be partially or completely surrounded by it. Similarly, it may be designed to generate shadows or reflections, or to color the light in the surrounding area.

== Sculpture as environment ==
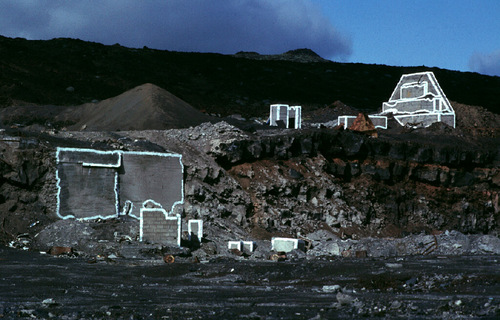
Eberhard Bosslet construction drawing La Restinga II, El Hierro, 1983

Julia M. Bush emphasizes the nonfigurative aspect of such works: "Environmental sculpture is never made to work at exactly human scale, but is sufficiently larger or smaller than scale to avoid confusion with the human image in the eyes of the viewer." Ukrainian-born American sculptor Louise Nevelson is a pioneer of environmental sculpture in this sense. Busch (p. 27) also places the sculptures of Jane Frank, as well as some works by Tony Smith and David Smith, in this category. Some environmental sculpture, so encompasses the observer, that it verges on architecture.

George Segal, Duane Hanson, Edward Kienholz, Robert Smithson, Christo, and Michael Heizer are well known practitioners of the genre, although Segal and Hanson's work is figural. Many figurative works of George Segal, for example, do qualify as environmental, in that—instead of being displayed on a pedestal as presentations to be gazed upon—they occupy and perturb the setting in which they are placed. A well known instance of this is the pair of Segal figures that sit on and stand next to one of the public benches in New York City's Sheridan Square; anyone can sit amongst them.

A lesser known but more appropriate example is Athena Tacha's 2-acre (8,100 m^{2}) park Connections in downtown Philadelphia (between 18th St. and 19th St. two blocks north of Vine St.), created as a landscape art environment after her winning a competition in 1980 (where Segal was actually one of the finalists). It was perhaps the first park designed entirely by an artist "sculpting the land" with planted terraces, rock clusters and paths (completed in 1992).

== Sculpture created for an environment ==
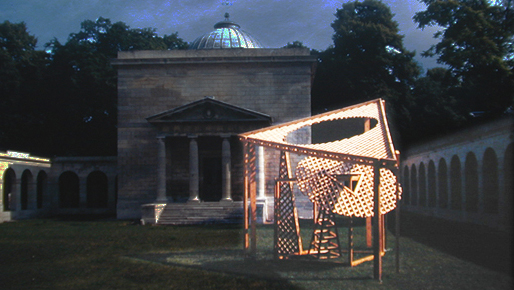
Lumen Poem, by Jean-Max Albert, 1985

A second sense of the term "environmental sculpture", with a somewhat different emphasis, is sculpture created for a particular set of surroundings. Thus, contemporary sculptor Beth Galston writes: "An environmental sculptor plans a piece from the very beginning in relationship to its surroundings. The site is a catalyst, becoming part of the creative process." This is quite different from a Nevelson sculpture, which can usually be moved from place to place, like a conventional sculpture, without losing its meaning and effectiveness.

By Galston's definition, an environmental sculpture is not merely site-specific art, as many conventional, figurative, marble monuments were created for specific sites. Galston stresses that environmental sculpture entails the idea that the piece also functions to alter or permeate the existing environment or even to create a new environment in which the viewer is invited to participate: "The finished sculpture and site become one integrated unit, working together to create a unified mood or atmosphere," she writes. Many of the large, site-specific, minimalist sculptures of Richard Serra also qualify as environmental sculpture, in both senses described here. Much of what is called "land art" or "earth art" could also be termed environmental sculpture under this definition. Andrew Rogers and Alan Sonfist are among notable current practitioners of land art.

Since the mid-1970s, French artist Jean-Max Albert worked with trellis structures, deconstructing and re-arranging the elements of surrounding architecture or including the site into the sculpture, with Sculptures Bachelard.

Since 1983, German artist Eberhard Bosslet has made interventions on ruins, so-called "Reformations and Side Effects"; he refers to the conditions of industrial and residential buildings by white-painted lines or black-painted color fields.

In 1999 the artist Elena Paroucheva created her concept for pylons, integrating energy networks with sculptures.

== Site-specific art and environmental art ==
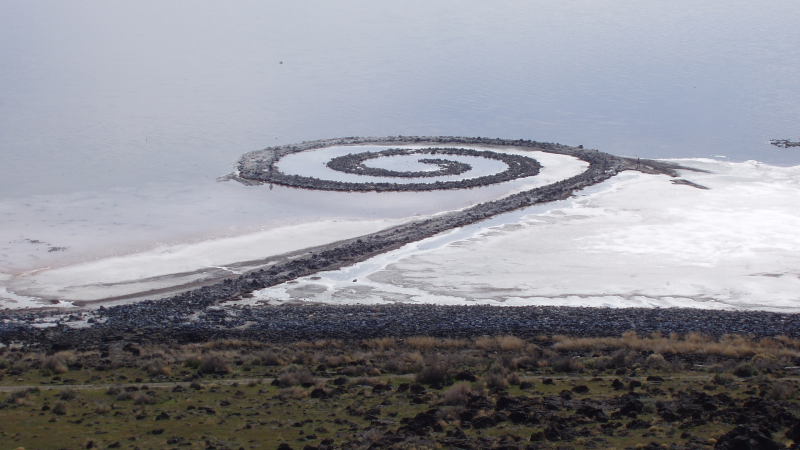
Spiral Jetty by Robert Smithson from atop Rozel Point, in mid-April 2005

The term "site-specific art" is sometimes used interchangeably with "environmental art". Louise Nevelson, for instance is a pioneer American environmental artist with sources disagreeing on classifying her work as "environmental sculpture". The terms "environment sculpture", "site-specific art", and "environmental art" have not yet completely stabilized in their meanings.

A reason for blurred definitions is that much of site-specific and environmental art was created from 1970 on for public spaces all over the United States, sponsored by federal (GSA and NEA) or state and city Percent for Art competitions, and many of the artists were women trying to succeed outside the established art-gallery world. Younger art historians will have to sort out the development of this marginalized "movement" and the importance of artists such as Olga Kisseleva, Patricia Johanson, Athena Tacha, Mary Miss, Alice Adams, Elyn Zimmerman, Merle Temkin and others who, from the early 1970s on, won and executed large outdoor public art commissions with new formal, kinesthetic and social underpinnings. Many of these artists were also ecologically conscious and created works that could offer a further definition of "environmental sculpture": art that is environmentally friendly and cares for the natural environment.

== See also ==
=== Topics ===
- Earthworks (art)
- Environmental art
- Land art (Earth art)
- Natural landscape
- Site-specific art
- Rock balancing
- Sustainable art

=== Institutions ===
- Dia Art Foundation
- Greenmuseum.org

=== Projects ===
- Roden Crater
- Tørskind Gravel Pit
- Zoe Coral

== Sources ==
- Busch, Julia M. A Decade of Sculpture: the New Media in the 1960s (The Art Alliance Press: Philadelphia; Associated University Presses: London, 1974) ISBN 978-0-87982-007-7
- Wilson, Laurie; Louise Nevelson : iconography and sources (New York City : Garland Pub., 1981) ISBN 978-0-8240-3946-2
- Uyehara, Seian; Environmental sculpture (Honolulu, 1971) OCLC 16327465
- Sonfist, Alan; Wolfgang Becker; Robert Rosenblum. Nature, the end of art : environmental landscapes (New York : D.A.P.; London : Thames & Hudson, 2004) ISBN 0-615-12533-6; ISBN 978-0-615-12533-6
