= Jean-Max Albert =

French painter, sculptor, writer, and musician (born 1942)

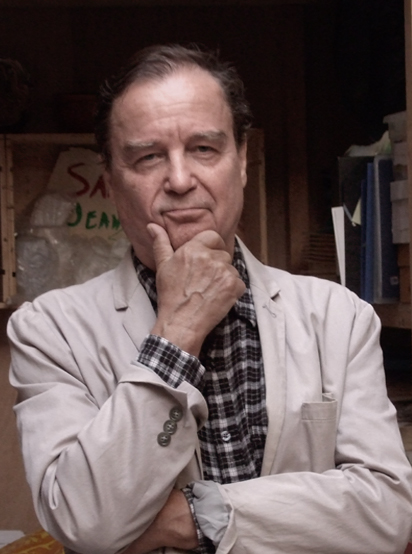
- Albert in Paris in 2014
- Born: Jean-Max Louis Albert; 25 July 1942; Loches, France
- Known for: Painting; sculpture; music; literature

Jean-Max Albert (Note: French pronunciation: [ʒɑ̃maks albɛʁ].) (born 1942) is a French painter, sculptor, writer, and musician. He has published theory, books on artists, and a collection of poems, plays and novels inspired by quantum physics. He perpetuated experiments initiated by Paul Klee and Edgar Varèse on the transposition of musical structures into formal constructions. Albert has also created environmental sculptures using plants to create architecture.

== Early life and education ==
Albert was born on July 25, 1942, in Loches, France, as the only child of Louis Georges Albert and Edith Albert (née Garand). His father was an officer in the French Navy and an engineer. Albert practiced painting and music beginning in childhood, and was also interested in carpentry, as his grandmother lived next to a carpentry workshop; when visiting her on vacation, Albert became interested in observing their work, particularly the technical drawings the carpenters used. This was later used as a direct inspiration for his trellis constructions, and his series Dessin du charpentier.

Albert studied at the Ecole Régionale des Beaux-Arts d'Angers, then at the Ecole Nationale des Beaux-Arts de Paris between 1958 and 1962. During that time, Albert was a trumpet player, joining Henri Texier's quintet and participating in the beginnings of the Free Jazz movement in Europe.

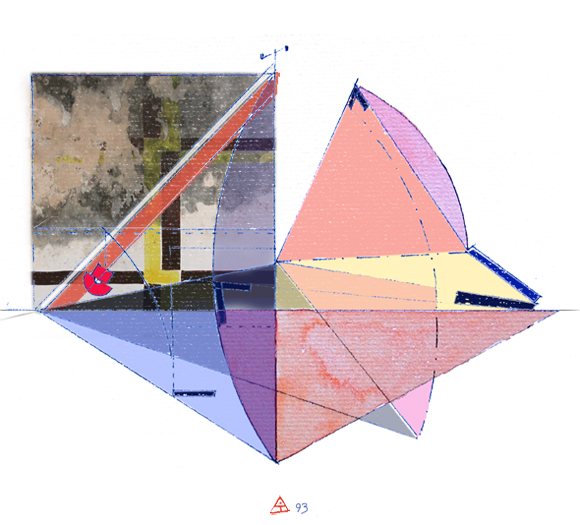
Bolide statique, Dessin du charpentier, 1993

== Career ==
Both Albert and his second wife, Sara Holt, have collaborated on and carried out various public art projects and exhibitions, becoming friends with artists such as Meret Oppenheim, Piotr Kowalski and Joan Mitchell.

In 1975, Albert founded the group show Serres in François Horticultural Greenhouses, Magny-in-Vexin. At the invitation of sculptor Mark di Suvero, he travelled to New York City, the first of many visits to the United States, where he collaborated later with the architect Wylde-Oubrerie on the Miller House in Lexington. He also travelled to Europe, North Africa, Middle East. In 1985, Albert joined the Ars Technica Association, connected to the Cité des Sciences et de l'Industrie, uniting philosophers, artists, scientists such as Jean-Marc Levy-Leblond, Piotr Kowalski, Claude Faure, Piero Gilardi and Jean-Claude Mocik, reflecting on the relationship between art and new technologies. From 1978 to 1986, Albert made his living as a graphic designer for science and technology publications. By his own account, this experience influenced his attention to subject matter in art. With Jean-Claude Mocik, he co-authored the project Midi-Pile in 1994.

== Style and method ==
Albert works in many different disciplines, media, styles and techniques. He often relates music and visual art, referring to Edgar Varese, and has collaborated with different composers and musicians as György Ligeti, Steve Lacy, Barney Wilen and François Tusques. A monumental structure like Iapetus set in Angoulême in 1985 refers to the structure of Thelonious Monk's "Misterioso", and Ligeti Rouen 1994, to Ligeti's "static sonorous surfaces".

=== Painting ===
Mental Image and Representation published in 2018, is a study of the relation subject matter/style. This essay is based on a work achieved by the Docteur Jean Philippe (1862-1931) l'image mentale, évolution et dissolution, and Alfred Korzybski's General semantics.

=== Treillis ===
In 1973, a conversation that Albert had with the architect Louis Kahn brought a comparison between the relationship of paint and canvas and vegetation on trellis. Albert then visited the tradition of trellis-work, 18th-century utopic architecture and created vegetal architecture in the field of Land art and Environmental Sculpture. It was comparable to the work of Gordon Matta-Clark, or Nils Udo, with whom he participated in the Wissenschaftszentrum exhibition in Bonn in 1979.

Vicenza in Hôtel de Sully, Paris, 1975 (in collaboration with Fougeras Lavergnolle) or the project O=C=O for the "Parco d' Arte Vivente" in Torino, 2007 are architectural and vegetal sculptures on trellis-work in the field of Site-specific art, Environmental sculpture and Generative art.

=== Calmodulin ===
Calmodulin is a project dedicated to the vegetation itself, in terms of biological activity. The utopian Calmoduline Monument is based on the property of a protein, calmodulin, to bond selectively to calcium. Exterior physical constraints (wind, rain, etc.) modify the electric potential of the cellular membranes of a plant and consequently the flux of calcium. However, the calcium controls the expression of the calmoduline gene. The plant can thus, when there is a stimulus, modify its typical growth pattern. The basic principle of this sculpture is that to the extent that they could be picked up and transported, these signals could be enlarged, translated into colors and shapes, and show the plant's decisions. This permanent show, installed in a public place, would suggest a level of fundamental biological activity.

=== Sculptures Bachelard (Observation Sculptures) ===
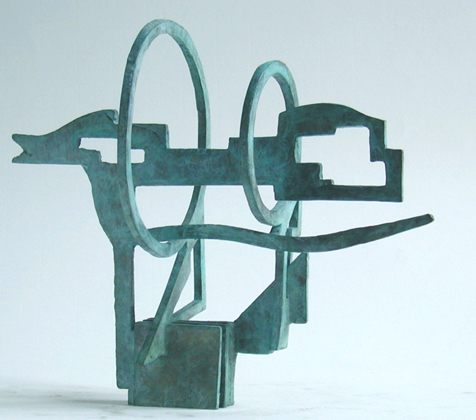
Espace Détaché Observation Sculpture, 2002

Albert's Sculptures Bachelard aims to concentrate the surrounding environment in the sculpture. When looking in the Observation Sculpture through its sights (an aperture or circles), the space beyond is (roughly) framed. Combining the different perspectives framed, the little sculpture, usually in bronze, takes shape after the space it is aiming at. An Observation Sculpture proposes a summary of this space concentrated, agglomerated and stuck together in a kind of core, like a geometric model of the site's character.

=== Anamorphosis ===
Un carré pour un square, Cube fantôme and Reflet anamorphose, are three pieces according to anamorphosis principle as described by Matilde Marcolli : « If the vector space one starts with is the 3-dimensional space, whose vectors have 3-coordinates v = (x_{1}, x_{2}, x_{3}), then, as long as v is nonzero and a real number λ is also nonzero, the vector v = (x_{1}, x_{2}, x_{3}) and the vector λv = (λx_{1}, λx_{2}, λx_{3}) point along the same straight line and we consider them as being the same point of our projective space. »

Un carré pour un square shows the perspective of a square from a specific vantage point. The design is formed by a set of lines of narrow plates of Carrara marble imbricated in the walls of the surrounding buildings and in the vestiges of a former construction site.

In another example, the specific vantage point is indicated by one of the Sculptures Bachelard set in Paris, Parc de la Villette. In this work, the anamorphosis appears as a reflection of a bronze construction This reflection discreetly shows the inclusion of a circle in a square in a triangle, in reference to the concept plan of the park by the architect Bernard Tschumi.Reflet Anamorphose allows, from the specific vantage point, to observe simultaneously the design and its anamorphosis.

== Gallery ==
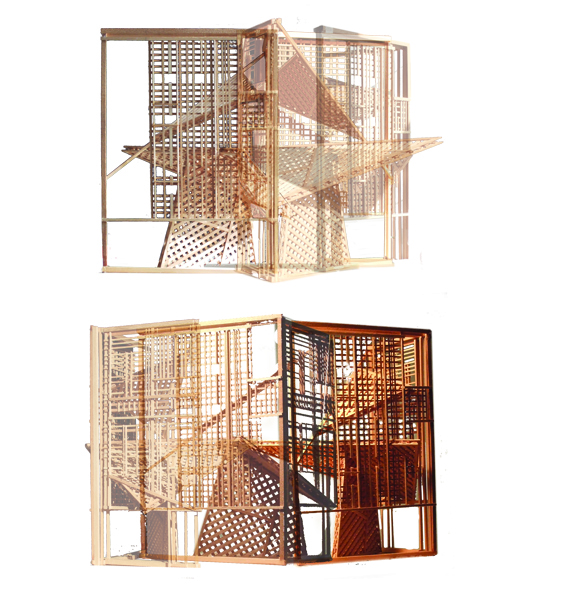
Photon Propagation, Model, 2013

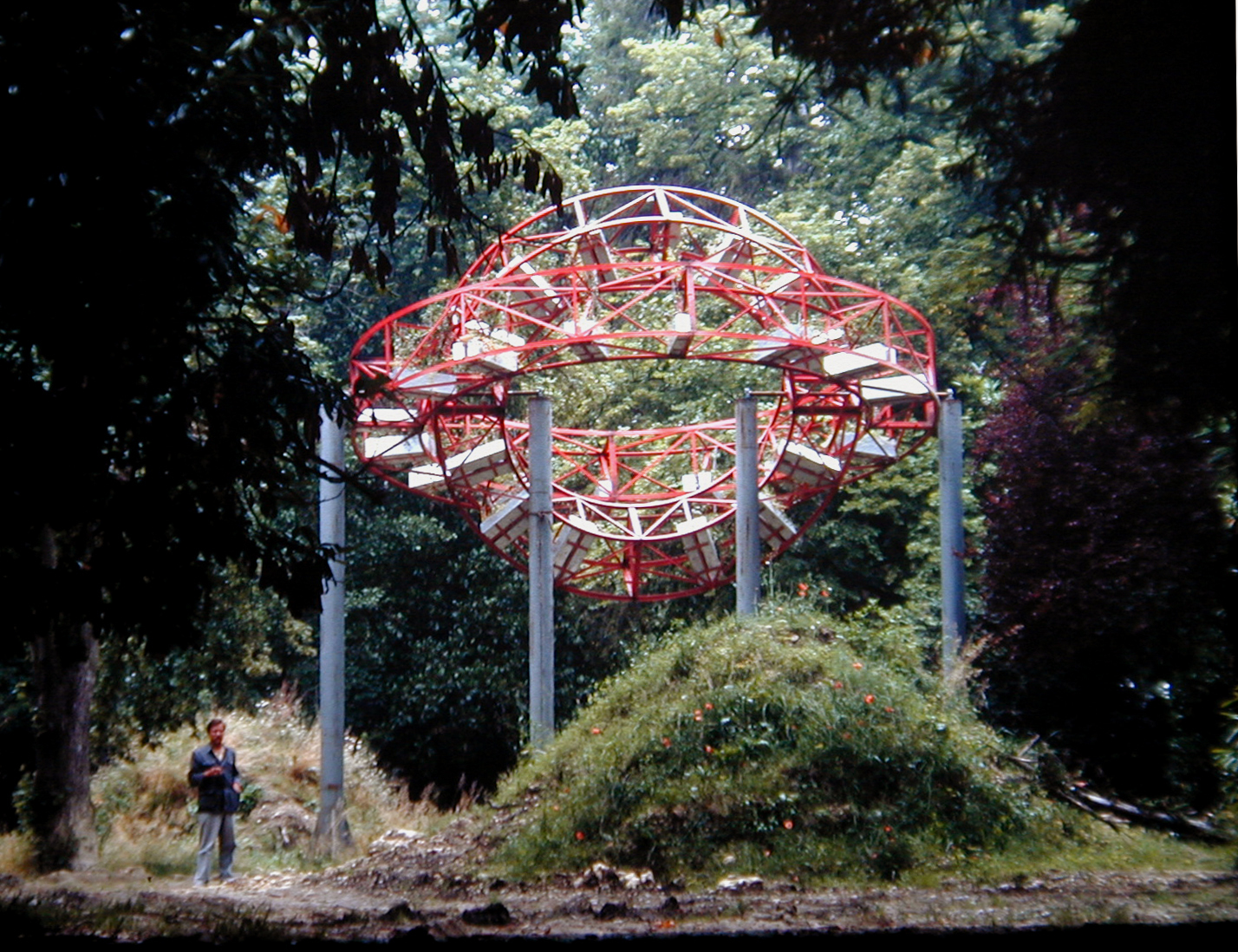
Iapetus, Angoulême,1985

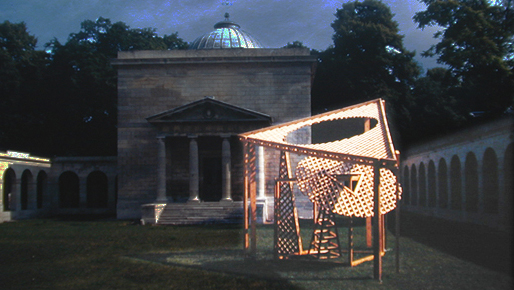
Lumen Poem, 1985

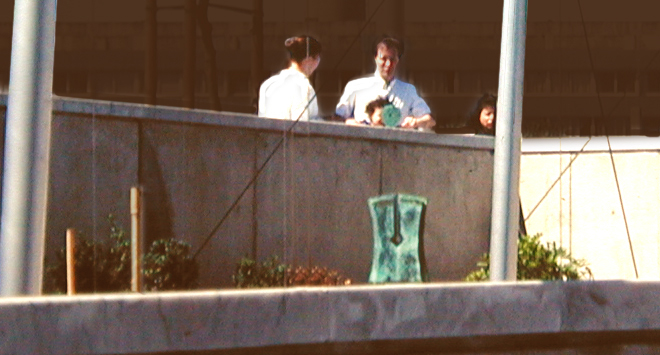
Observation Sculptures
Parc de La Villette, Paris 1986

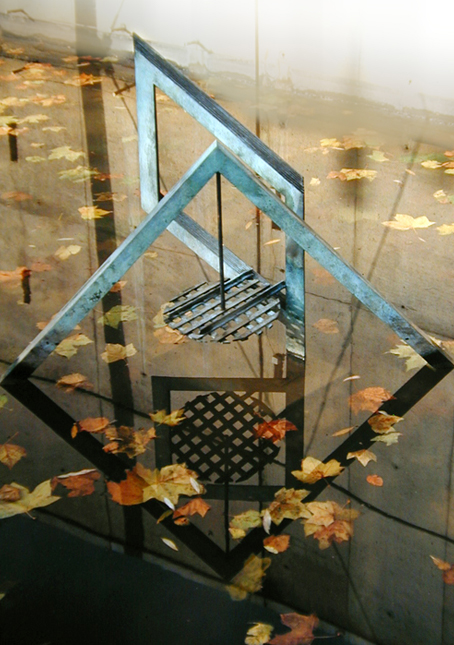
Reflet anamorphose
Parc de La Villette, Paris 1986

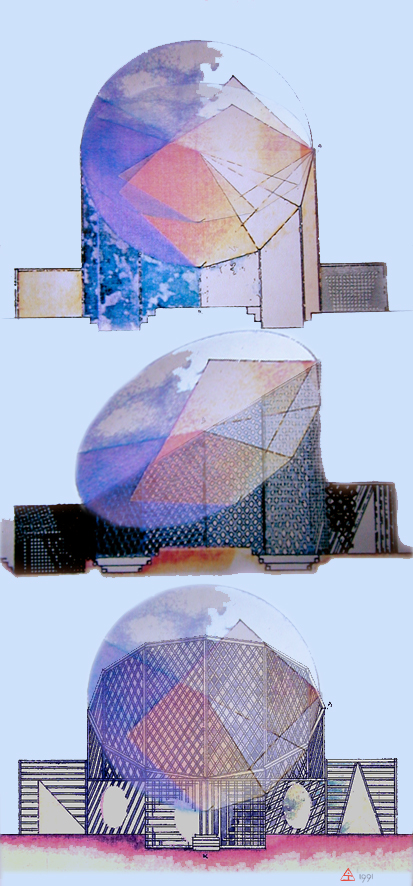
Project for a monument to calmodulin,1991

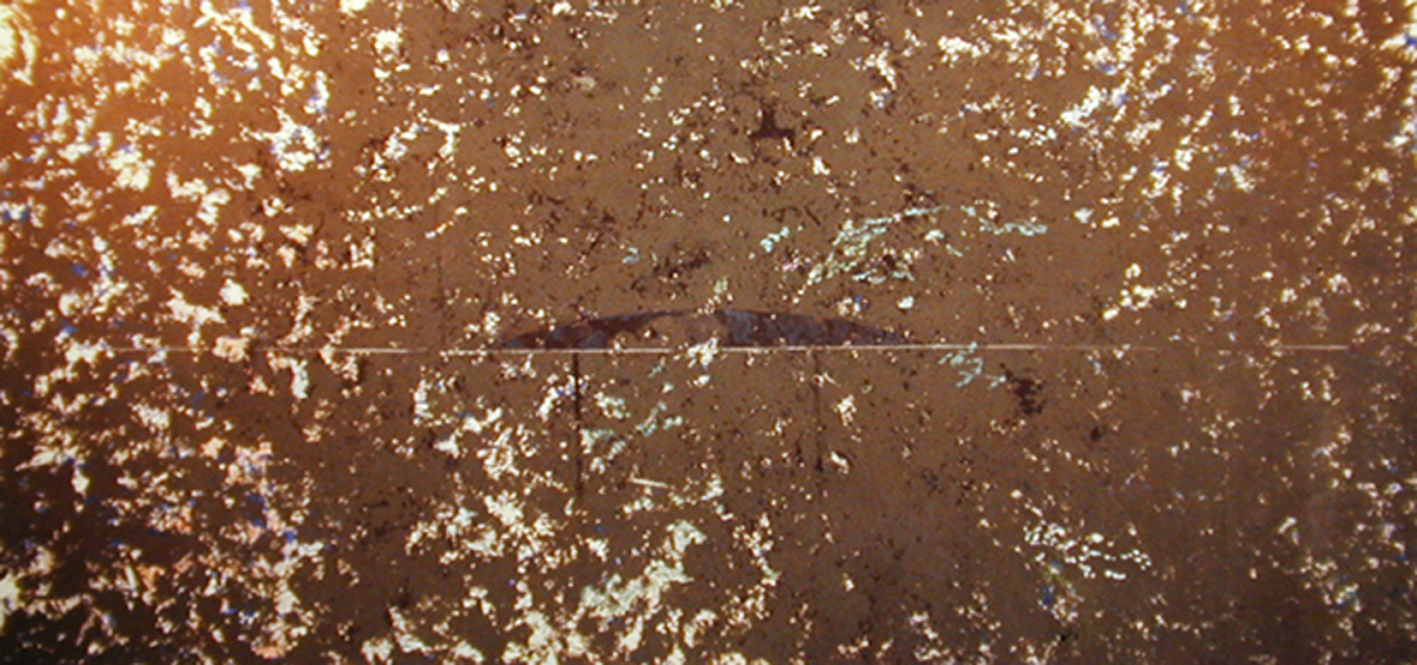
Free Jazz, 1973, acrylic on canvas, 5,30 x 2,75 m.

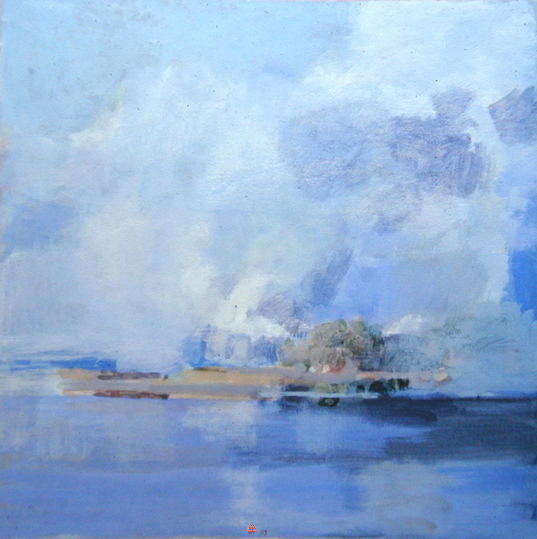
Portrait de la Loire, 1988, oil on canvas 60 x 60 cm., Musée de la Loire, France.

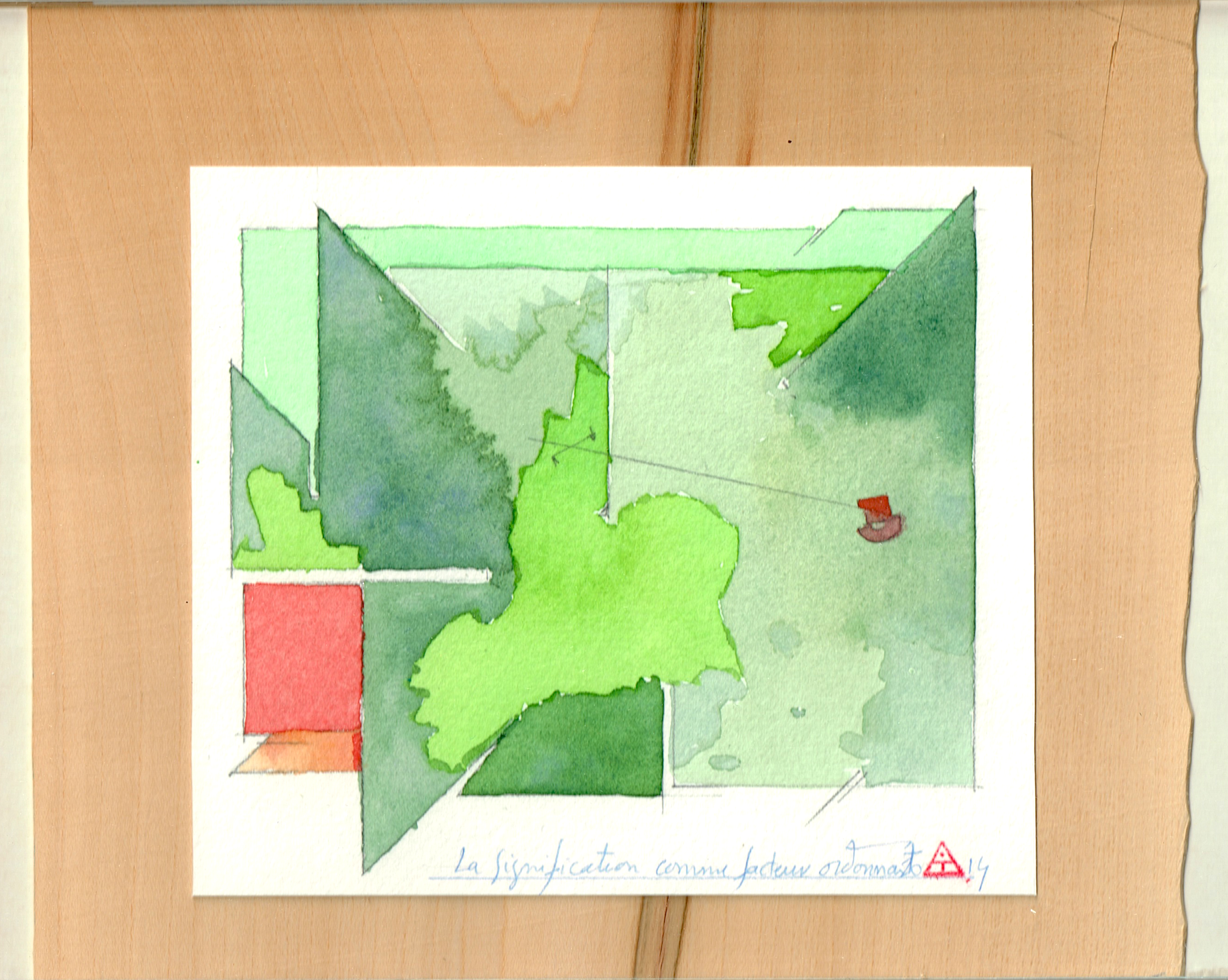
Signification as factor of order, 2014

== Books, poetry, essays ==
- 1975, Soulages, in Opus n°57.
- 1978, Tuteurs Fabuleux, Éditions Speed, Paris. FRBNF34609833
- De l'architecture transparente, in Opus n°65
- 1981, Lithium Migrants, Éditions Cheval d’Attaque, Paris. ISBN 2-86200-017-5
- 1982, De l'architecture transparente, Lotus international n°31.
- 1984, Les nouveaux voyages du capitaine Cook, Éditions ACAPA, Angoulême. ISBN 2-904353-00-3
- 1991,Vuthemas, Ars technica n°4.
- 1993, Space in Profile, (French and English), Les Éditions de La Villette, Paris. ISBN 2-903539-21-9
- 1992, Mathesis singularis, Ars technica n°7.
- 1994, La caméra sans film, Sens & Tonka Editeurs, Paris. ISBN 2-910170-10-1;
- Une obscurité infiniment lumineuse, Alliages n°19.
- 2002, Jean-Bernard Métais et Sir George H. Darwin, Temps imparti, Éditions Beaudoin Lebon, Paris.
- 2005, Le tour du blues en 80 mondes, Sens & Tonka Editeurs, Paris. ISBN 2-84534-118-0
- 2009, Les Querpéens I, Emma Qun'q, Les Éditions du Quintelaud, Paris. ISBN 978-2-9533484-0-8
- 2012, Les Querpéens II, Ray Quernöck, Les Éditions du Quintelaud, Paris. ISBN 978-2-9533484-5-3
- 2018, Mental image and representation, (French and English), Translation by Helen Arnold, Éditions Mercier & associés, Paris. ISBN 978-2-9563142-1-9
- 2009, Thelonious Monk Architecte, L'art du jazz, Éditions Le Félin, Paris.
- 2018, Piotr Kowalski, A contemporary's Insights, Far-Sited : California International Sculpture Symposium 1965/2015, University Art Museum, California State University, Long Beach.
- 2020, Quand la Lune écrit, Alliages n°81.

=== Public works ===
- Vicenza, Hotel de Sully, Paris 1977
- Attique, Künstler-Garten, Wissenschaftszentrum, Bonn, Germany, 1979
- Iapetus, Parc de l'école des beaux-arts, Angoulême, 1985, 45°39’15.246’’N0°8’54.834’’E
- Rayon, Centre Culturel Français, Damascus, Syria, 1986
- Sculptures de visées, and Reflet anamorphose Parc de la Villette, Paris, 1986, 48°53’33.8’’N2°23’26’’E
- Cube fantôme, ZI de Goussainville, 1986
- Autumn in Peking, South Pasadena, USA, 1987, 34°6’40’435’’N118°8’33.619’’W
- Vers l'étoile polaire, Parc des Maillettes, Melun Sénart, 1987
- Un carré pour un square, Place Frehel, Paris, 1988
- Une horloge végétale, Square Héloïse et Abelard, 24 rue Dunois, Paris, 1988, 48°49’52.745N2°22’13.12’’E
- Planches, Terrasse du Musée de la Toile de Jouy, à Jouy-en-Josas, 1990, 48°46’8.591’’N2°9’5.868’’E
- Ligeti, Rectorat de Rouen, Rouen, 1994, 49°26’35’’N1°5’4.6’’E
- Auriga, Rond-point Montaigne, Angers, 1995, 47°27’59’’N 0°31’30’’W
- Tombeau de Bartillat, Etrépilly, 1997, 49°2’18’’N 2°55’53.2’’E

=== Videos, choreographies ===
- 2005, Le tour du Blues en 80 mondes. 80 short films with pianist and composer François Tusques.

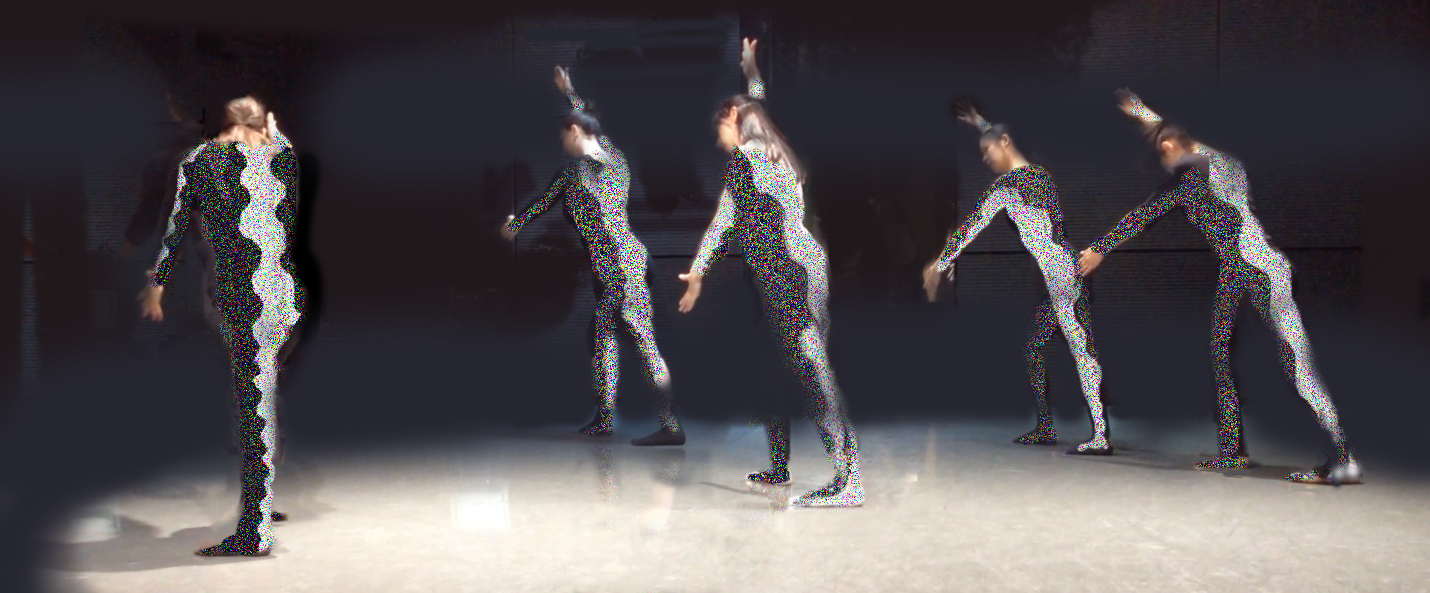
Kaluza, ballet, 2013

- 1979, Carlotta's Smile, Environment and Choreography with Michala Marcus, Music Carlos Zingaro, AR CO, Lisbonne, Portugal,
- 1980,Morgane Amalia, Choreography with Michala Marcus, 2nd Symposium d'art contemporain d'Angoulême,
- 1981, A treat “Espaces structurés” Videos by Hervé Nisic, choreography by Michala Marcus and Jean-Max Albert, music by Kent Carter.
- 2013, Kaluza, 21 pièces pour piano et chorégraphie with Sarah Berges. Dance Mission Theatre, San Francisco,

== Exhibitions ==
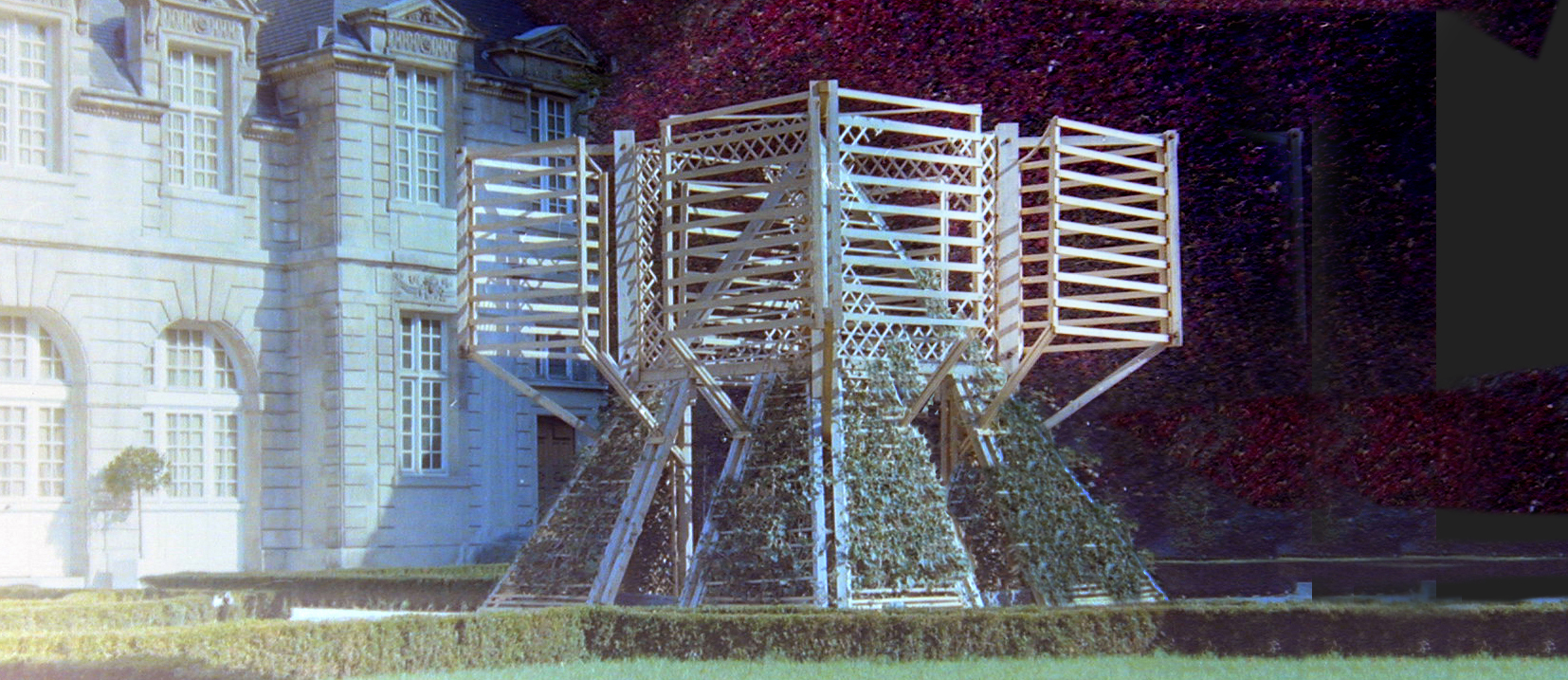
Vicenza Exhibition Hôtel de Sully, Paris, 1977

Albert participated to a number of various exhibitions including : Vers une nouvelle architecture, Centre Georges Pompidou, Paris, 1978; Sculpture Nature, Centre d'Arts Plastiques Contemporain, Bordeaux, France,1978; Künstler-Garten, Wissenschaftszentrum, Bonn, Germany, 1979; A la recherche de l'urbanité, Centre Georges Pompidou, Paris, 1980; Actuele Franse Kunst, International Cultureel Centrum, Antwerpen, Belgium, 1982; Pavillon d'Europe, Galerie de Séoul, Seoul, Korea, 1982; Images et imaginaires d'architecture, Centre Georges Pompidou, Paris, 1984; Inventer 89, Grande halle du Parc de la Villette, Paris, 1987; L'art au défi des technosciences? Pavillon Tusquet, Parc de la Villette, Paris, 1992; L'art renouvelle la ville, Musée National des Monuments Français, Paris, 1992; Ars Technica, ExtraMuseum, Turin, Italy, 1992; Useless Science, MoMa, New York, USA, 2000; Fragmentations a constructed world, Musée d’Art et d’Histoire de Saint-Brieux, 2007; Dalla Land arte alla bioarte, Parco d'Arte Vivante, Turin, Italy, 2007; Tables à Desseins, La tannerie, Bégard France 2013; Du dessin à la sculpture, Musée Manoli, La Richardais, France, 2014.

=== Individual shows ===
AR CO, Lisbonne, Portugal, 1979; Lithium Migrants, Galerie Françoise Palluel, Paris, 1981 and Galerie Richard Foncke, Gand, Belgium, 1981; Lumen poème, CRDC, Rosny-sur-Seine, 1984; Galerie Charles Sablon, Paris, 1987,; Galerie Intersection 11/20, Paris, 1991; Fleeting White Space, Antwerpen, Belgium, 1994,; Galerie Aïda Kebadian, Paris, 2001, 2002, 2010; Galerie Mercier & Associés, Paris, 2018, 2020

=== Collections ===
Centre Pompidou; Fond National d’Art Contemporain; Fond Régional d'Art Contemporain de Bretagne; Artothèque, Angers; Fond Régional d'Art Contemporain Poitou-Charente; Musée Paul Delouvrier; Musée de la Loire, Cosne-Cours-sur-Loire

== Personal life ==
Albert was married to, and later divorced, Mireille Salen. Their only son, Max-Pol died in 2010. Albert currently lives in Paris, France with his second wife, Sara Holt whom he married in 1983.
