= Piotr Kowalski =

Polish sculptor and architect

Piotr Kowalski (2 March 1927 – 7 January 2004) was a Polish artist, sculptor, and architect. Kowalski worked in non-traditional materials including electronic and mechanical devices, neon art, large earth works, explosions and other natural phenomena including plant growth and gravity. Kowalski attended MIT in order to study mathematics, but turned to architecture, and then to sculpture. He immigrated to France as an architect for UNESCO and spent most of the rest of his life in Paris. Along with gallery works, he installed several large outdoors projects.

== Biography ==
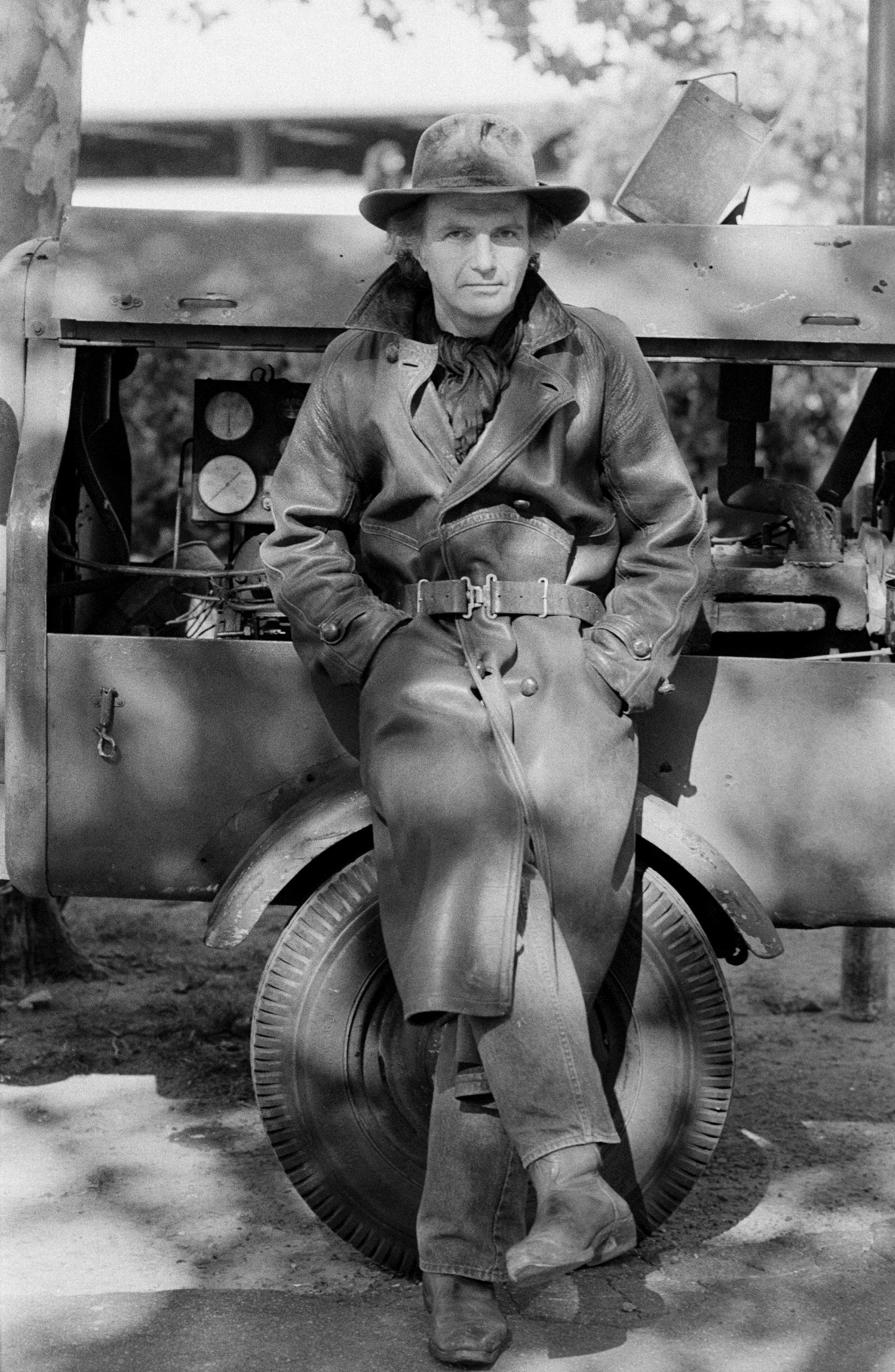
Piotr Kowalski

Piotr Kowalski was born 2 March 1927 in Lwów, Second Polish Republic (now Lviv, Ukraine). By 1946 he was a refugee of the war living in Brazil. He attended Massachusetts Institute of Technology from 1947 to 1952, receiving a Bachelors in Architecture, and maintained relations with MIT throughout his life. He worked as an architect for I. M. Pei from 1952 until 1953, then joined Marcel Breuer as an architect at UNESCO in Paris.

He became a fellow at the Center for Advanced Visual Studies at MIT in 1978, and continued in that position until 1985.

In 1985, he became president of the Ars Technica Association connected to the Cité des Sciences et de l'Industrie uniting philosophers, artists, scientists such as Jean-Marc Levy-Leblond, Claude Faure, Jean-Max Albert, Sara Holt, Piero Gilardi, Jean-Claude Mocik, reflecting on the relationship between art and new technologies.

He was named professor at École nationale supérieure des Beaux-Arts de Paris in 1987. He died in Paris.

== Bibliography ==
- Sisyphe géomètre, with Ghérasim Luca (poème), Genève, Impr. Union (Paris), Claude Givaudan|Givaudan 1966
- Le Chant de la carpe, with Ghérasim Luca (poème), Paris, François Di Dio, Le Soleil Noir, 1973
- Kowalski, espaces, épreuves : contient Serre des temps de Henri-Alexis Baatsch; Cimento : Kowalski by Jean-Christophe Bailly; Idées récurrentes sur l'épreuve du sens de Jacques Dyck, Genève, Givaudan, 1978
- Piotr Kowalski, by Jean-Christophe Bailly : Éditions Hazan, Paris, 1988
- Information Transcript (CDrom édité par le Métafort d'Aubervilliers)
- Art et Science, Hommage à Piotr Kowalski, 20/21^{e} siècles, Cahiers du Centre Pierre Francastel, n°3, automne 2006
- Piotr Kowalski, A contemporary’s Insights, by Jean-Max Albert, Far-Sited : California International Sculpture Symposium 1965/2015, University Art Museum, California State University, Long Beach, 2018

== Filmography ==
- Deux temps, trois mouvements, Gisèle et Luc Meichler, Centre Georges Pompidou et EXLGM©, Paris, 1982
- In Situ Kowalski, Gisèle et Luc Meichler, Paris, EXLGM©, Paris, 1993
- Le Cube de la Population, Gisèle et Luc Meichler, Paris, EXLGM©, Paris, 1995
- Piotr Kowalski entretien avec Claude Guibert, Encyclopédie audiovisuelle de l'art contemporain, Paris, 1996
- Piotr Kowalski, entretiens à propos des projets, Gisèle et Luc Meichler, EXLGM©, Paris, 2000

== Outdoor works ==
- Now 33° 46' 52.24 N 118° 06' 46.07" W, 1965.
- L'Axe de la Terre 48° 50' 25.21" N 2° 35' 04.17" E. 1992.
  - L'Axe de la Terre Université de Marne la Vallée,
- L'Arche de Saint-Quentin en Yvelines 48° 47' 23.55" N 2° 02' 08.92" E
- Place des Degrés (Place Blaise Pascal) 48° 53' 22.93 N 2° 14' 08.40" E
- Le Grand Escalier 48° 53' 29" N 2° 14' 11" E. 1991-1993.
- Signal (Tour de Vitry), 48° 47' 19" N 2° 23' 25" E. 1974
- Bimetallic, the Metal Forum in Danube Park, (Thermocouple, forum metall Donaulande) Linz, Austria
- Tour de Créteil 1990.
- Totem Holographique 1993.
- Windmill, Yamaguchi Beach 34°00'19.16" N 131°22'25.35" E
- Sunflower, Daikanyama, Tokyo 35°38'56.39" N 139°42'08.29" E
- Oike Dori Fountain, Kyoto 35°00'39.40" N 135°46'11.22" E. 1997.
- Electronic Tree, Morioka Japan
