= Sculptures Bachelard =

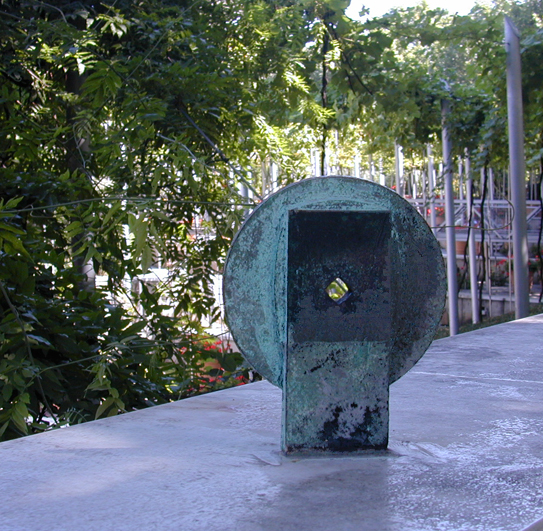
- Artist: Jean-Max Albert
- Year: 1986
- Type: Bronze
- Location: Parc de la Villette; Paris, France; 48°53′33.8″N 2°23′26.2″E
- Owner: EPPV

Sculptures Bachelard is an In Situ work by French artist Jean-Max Albert installed in 1986 in the Parc de la Villette, Paris, France. It is named after the author of The Poetics of Space, Gaston Bachelard. It consists of a set of 8 sculptures arranged around the perimeter of the Jardin de la Treille.

== Description and interpretation ==
The work takes the form of an installation in two distinct parts:

- Sculptures Bachelard : 7 sculptures in bronze green patina, ±17 x 15 x 4 cm, Fusions foundry.
- Anamorphosis reflection, sculpture in bronze, green patina, 120 x 80 x 60 cm, Landowski foundry.

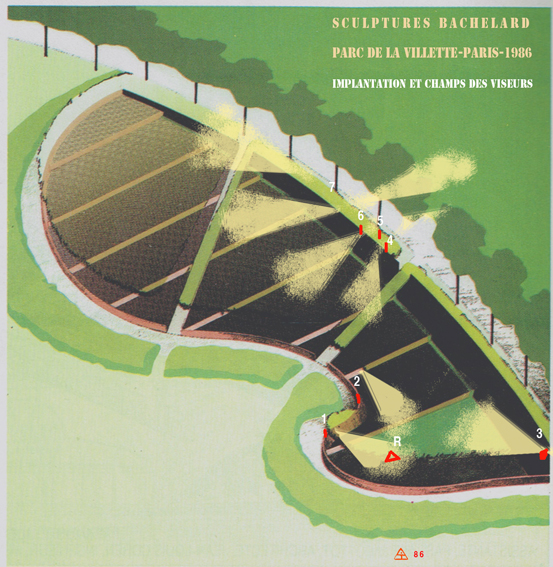
Sculptures Bachelard ( sculptures de visées)Implantation 1986

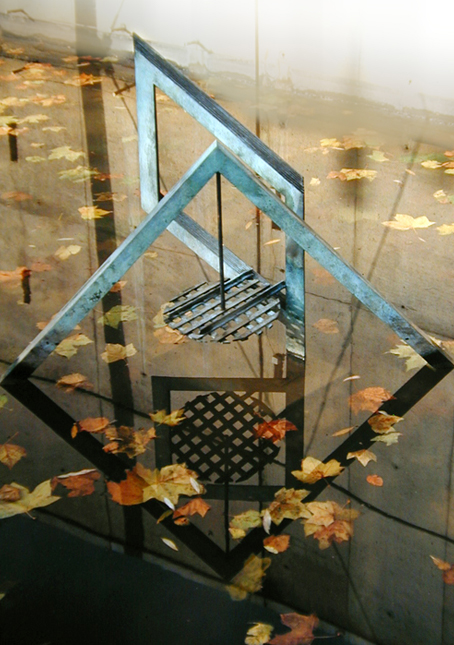
Reflection with anamorphosis

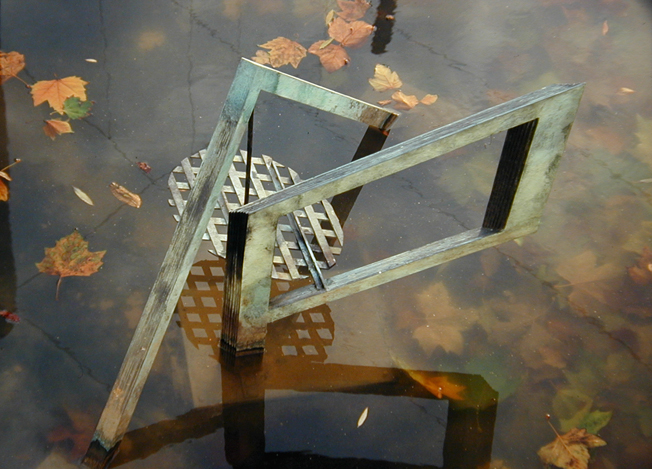
Reflection without anamorphosis

When gazing into the sculptures, the space beyond and around is roughly framed. Combining in a cubist manner the differently framed perspectives, the sculptures propose to "render the quality of a specific portion of space". A "rendering" not in the sense of a photograph – or it would be a kind of camera that would take one shot and then petrified itself in the form of the environment targeted – but more like an abstract model concentrating, agglomerating, in a sort of nucleus (and somehow in an animist concept) the spirit of this space. Each sculpture thus, transposes into a geometric summary portions of space which, according to their location, suggest different qualities of atmosphere designed by Bernard Tschumi, Gilles Vexlard and Laurence Vacherot. If six of the seven "viseurs" relate to the character of the different points of view, the seventh relates to a precise event : a modest bronze assemblage, fixed in the corner of a pond, below the thematic garden, perpetuates a tradition of garden landscape which conceals images, perspectives or symbols. Given favorable position of the sun, the reflection of this seemingly heterogeneous element appears a regular geometric. The reflection presents a circle encased in a square itself inscribed in a triangle. This figure referring to Bernard Tschumi’s master plan for the park.

== Acquisition and installation ==
Under François Mitterrand’s presidency, many public works of art were initiated in the frame of the "Grands travaux", an artistic renewal supported by the government. In February 1986 the Etablissement Public du Parc de la Villette (EPPV) commissioned Jean-Max Albert for this sculpture project.

== Reception ==
For art critic Bruno Suner, Albert’s Bachelard Sculptures reverse the usual setting of a sculpture, which is to be within the site, by including the site into the sculpture For art critic Sarah Mc Fadden, the sculptures : "Parse the particularities of their surrounding with a rigor that heightens the viewer’s perception and, like advanced physics, leads to the realm of poetry. The works are conceived as frames for space, light and form that reveal what lies beyond or around them." Since the dimensions of the concerned space are "absorbed" by the pieces they are, strictly speaking, out of scale. Transient sparrows nevertheless firmly secured on the marble perimeter of the Jardin de la treille. They are discovered by the public in friendly propinquity the space encountered. "Air space rather than obstruct it" noted art critic Frédéric Mialet.

== Gallery ==
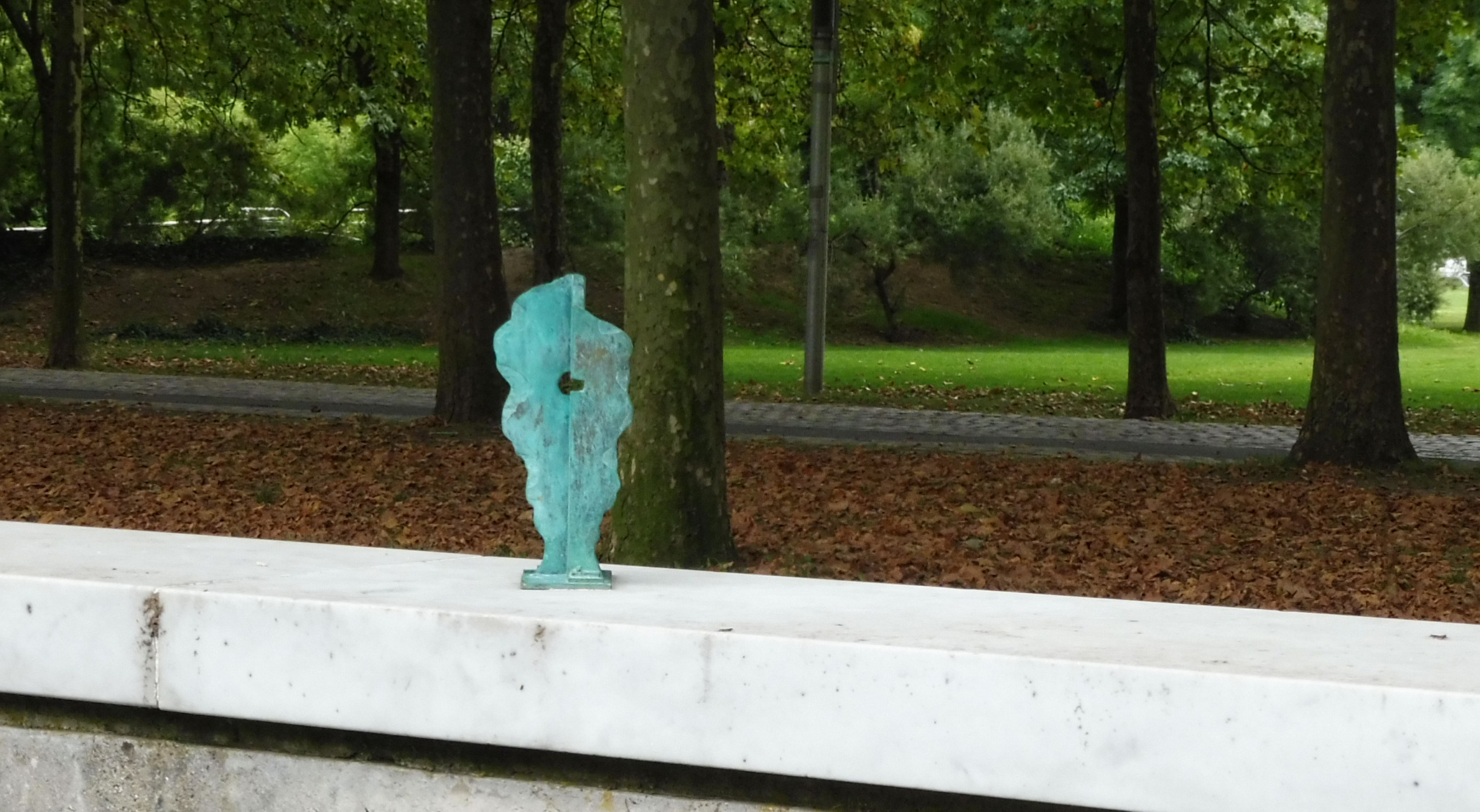
Sculpture Bachelard VI

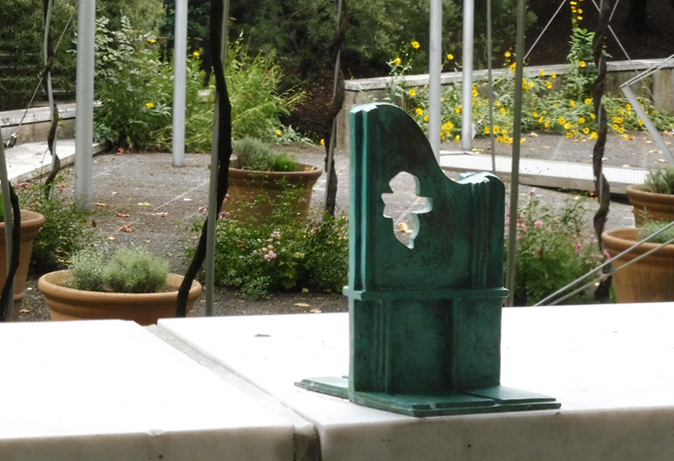
Sculpture Bachelard III

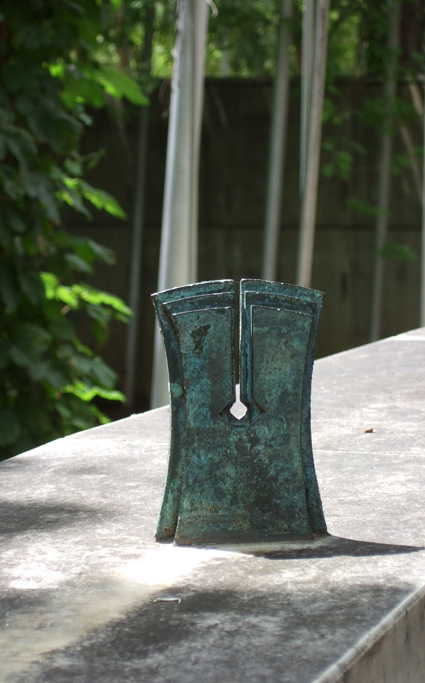
Sculpture Bachelard I

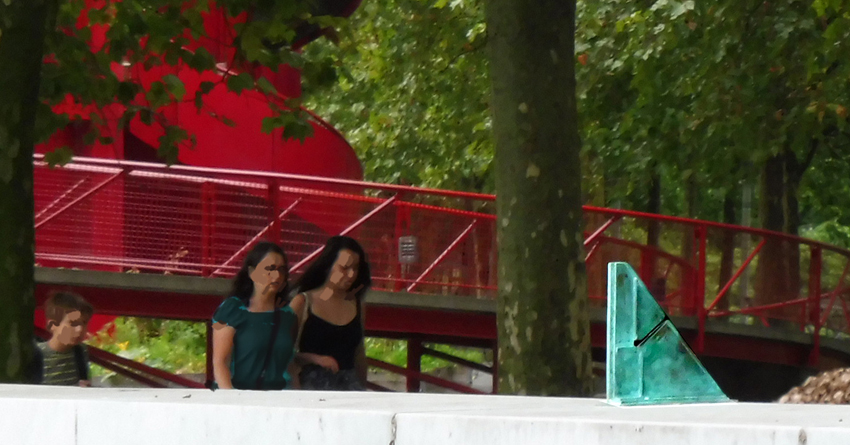
Sculpture Bachelard II
