= Cecilia Lavelli =

Italian painter

Cecilia Lavelli (2 June 1906 in Turin – 14 July 1998 in Turin) was an Italian artist and art model.

Lavelli painted landscapes and still lifes, as well as modelling for many painters and sculptors such as Cesare Ferro, Felice Casorati, and Daphe Maugham Casorati. Her face was reproduced by Edoardo Rubino for the gigantic Winged Victory sculpture of the "Victory Beacon Light" placed on top of the “Colle della Maddalena” hill in Turin. She also modelled for the students at Albertina Academy of Fine Arts.

Lavelli is the wife of Swiss artist Mario Gilardi and the mother of the Arte povera artist Piero Gilardi.
