= Sara Holt =

American sculptor and photographer (born 1946)

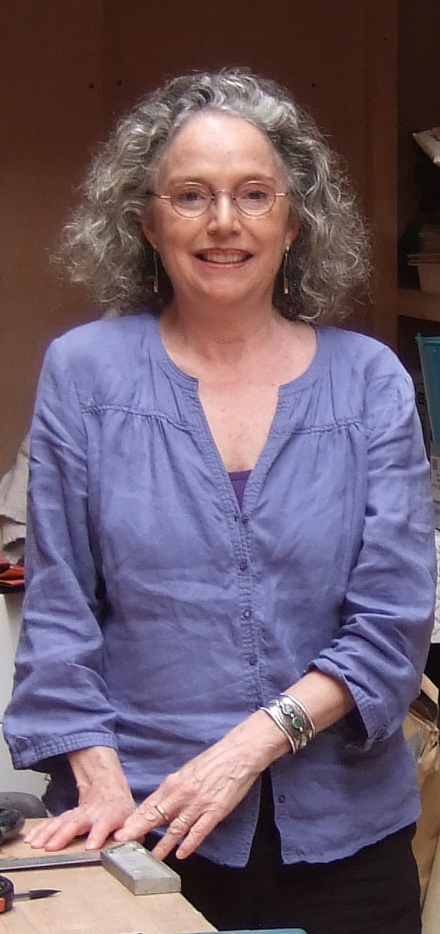
- Sara Holt in her studio, Paris, 2014
- Born: March 14, 1946 (age 80); Los Angeles, California, U.S.
- Education: University of Colorado (BFA)
- Known for: Sculpture, photography, ceramics

Sara Holt (born 1946) is an American sculptor and photographer. She is creating mainly in sculpture and photography and more recently in ceramics. She is one of the contemporary artists whose work helps to refine the field of creation situated within the boundaries of science and art. She has lived in Paris since 1969.

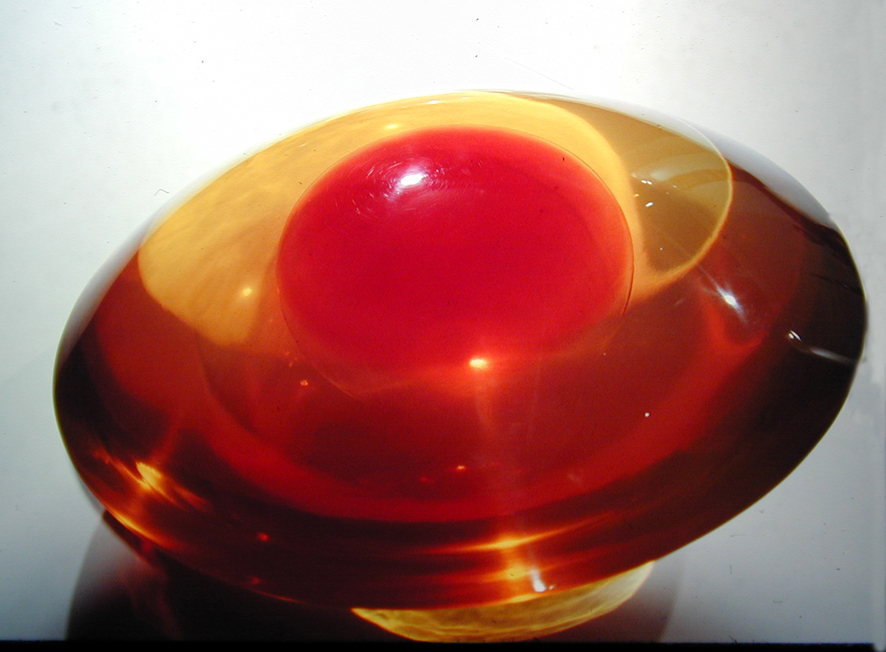
Mars lens, 1970

== Career ==
Holt graduated from the University of Colorado with a BFA degree in 1968. She was an artist in residence at the Cité internationale des arts in Paris from 1969 to 1971.

Her scientific and artistic household and the family house built by architect Irving Gill (where she lived from age six to eighteen) influence her work to varying degrees. After graduating from the University of Colorado, Holt traveled in Europe and decided to prolong her stay in France. She developed new artistic techniques while combining her inherent nature of the media—the casting of resin, glazing of ceramics, the process of photography itself—and very constructed, layered or planned objects. Holt took advantage of the freedom and excitement of the sixties not only from a technical point of view, but also to merge her seemingly contrasting centers of interest and avenues of exploration: use of light and transparency with the resin sculpture and light tubes, as opposed to photographing in the dark, or using and letting chance operate within the artistic framework. Her ability to explore the vital elements of nature (light, color, earth, space and time) while maintaining a spiritual, poetical and organic quality place Sara Holt’s body of work at the crossroads of science and art.

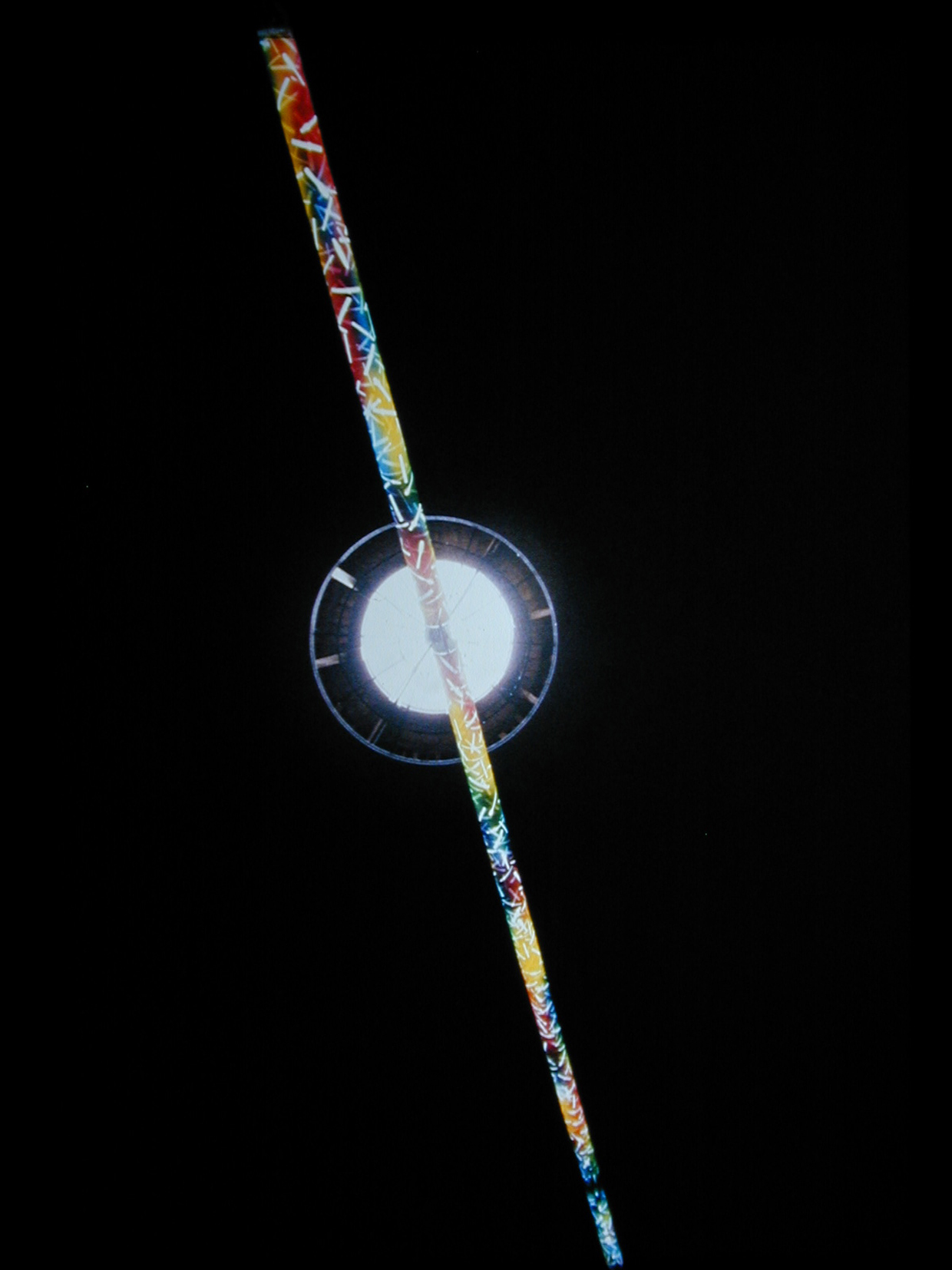
Janet's Comet Rosny-sur-Seine, 1984

During the fall of 1968, she met Piotr Kowalski. In the spring of 1969 she obtained a studio at the Cité International des Arts in Paris, where she continued to cast resin, and she met artists and critics including Erró, Alain Jouffroy, Frank Popper and Aline Dallier and, later, James Lee Byars, Henri-Alexis Baatsh, Jean-Christophe Bailly, Meret Oppenheim and Joan Mitchell. Official recognition crystallized when Pierre Gaudibert organized her first individual exhibition at l'ARC (Paris, 1971), a prestigious venue for contemporary art. The exhibition included " Little Rainbow Snakes ", a 2-meter Cone, some large spheres, two large " Lenses " with resin spheres cast inside, a big Rainbow Snake, and several tear drop shaped prisms : all polyester resin work.

== Work ==
=== Sculpture ===
She worked in bronze, plaster, ceramics and wool but mainly in resin, a medium she discovered during her second summer course at Pasadena City College on David Elder's suggestion. Holt was immediately captivated by the light and transparency that this medium offered. A trip to the Grand Canyon in 1968 cemented her early interests in stratification and organic processes. Her works are made using different layers of colored resin which are cast layer by layer in molds and then left to set after being catalyzed. Certain pieces take up to a year to complete.

Since 1972, the year of her first monumental commissioned piece in Bagnolet, near Paris, " Douze Cones ", she has continued to work simultaneously on a monumental scale (when commissioned) and in the studio. She spent almost a year in the USA in 1977 working on the " Double Rainbow ", an outdoor piece in welded and painted steel continuing to experiment with the spectrum and its effects through forms and subsequent surrounding space. In 1981, she mets Jean-Max Albert, and they collaborated on many realizations in public art. The next major step in her work was " Light Tubes ", an installation created for the Hospice Saint Charles, Rosny-sur-Seine in 1984, combining the use of light and color throughout space. The Plexiglas tubes were spray painted in varying shades and intensity over a series of overlapping stencils in the form of lines. Neon or fluorescent tubes were then inserted and the tubes hang on a wall or can be upright. The " Light Tubes " appear to sum up her previous concerns revolving around light and its properties (optical illusions, the appearance and quality of color, etc.) and integrate patterns that are directly inspired from the " Star Crossings ".

=== Photography ===
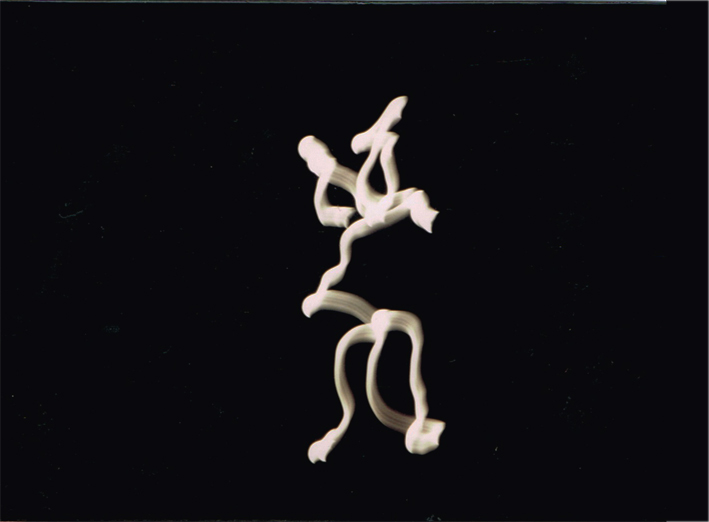
Moon Dancer Photo of the Moon, 1995

The photographs she made of her transparent sculpture in 1969 opened up a new field of experimentation. Photographing the sky at night, she experimented with the movements of stars which are recorded : multicolored curved lines of different lengths and thicknesses. The next set of photographs recorded the sky with two long exposures at varying degrees: the artist intervened only to move the camera and obtained the « Star Crossings ». The poetical nature of these images are in harmony with the scientific approach. Using a sail boat as a « writing tool », Holt took long exposures of the moon with the rocking of waves. These images convey a sign, a symbol or a « message ». She has collected a complete alphabet and such images as Papillon, Why, or No.

=== Ceramics ===
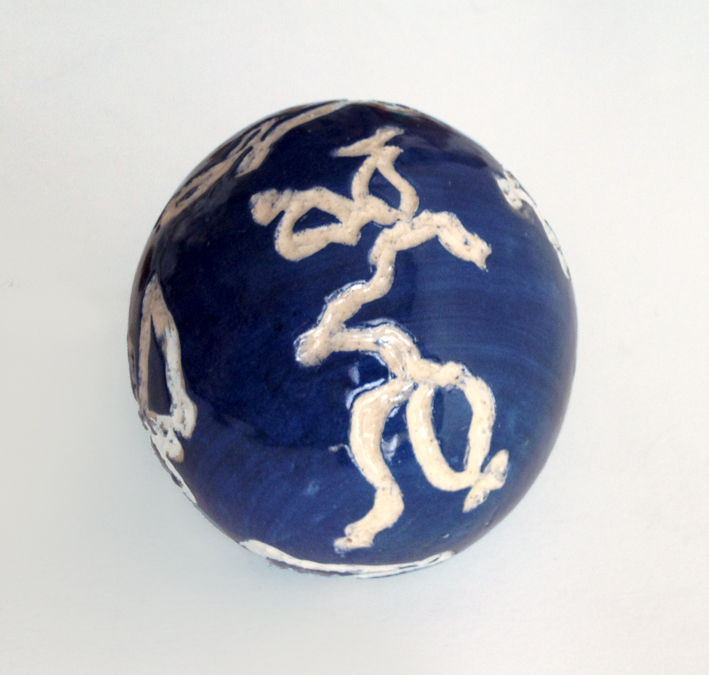
Moon Dancer Ceramic, 2002

Since 1993, Holt has been working in ceramics. Using some of the signs recorded during these photographic sessions as graphic signs painted on to hand-built or thrown pieces, she is equally exploring a more naturalistic way through her ceramic " Oysters ". The fashioning of the clay, and its inherent organic nature, the type of subjects chosen, is the artist's way of remaining true to an Indian belief she learns of when photographing at San Miguel Island, giving back to nature and to the cosmos what she has already received, namely the " messages ". Messages harvested while photographying the moon from a rocking sailboat at night.

== Notable exhibitions ==
=== Solo ===
- Sara Holt, Sculptures, ARC, Musée d'Art Moderne de la Ville de Paris, 1971
- Städtische Kunstsammlungen, Ludwigshafen, Germany, 1972
- Galerie Lucien Durand, Paris. 1973
- Night Light, Ufficio dell'Arte, Paris, 1979
- Why, Galerie Vivian Veteau, Paris, 1981
- AcApA, Hôtel St. Simon, Angoulême, France, 1983
- Galerie Q, Tokyo, Japan, 1983
- Lumen, Hospice St. Charles, Rosny sur Seine, France, 1984.
- Cathédrale Notre-Dame de Laon, L'Été de la Photographie, Laon, France. 1992
- La Box, Bourges, France, 1992.
- L'Artothèque d'Entreprise Michel Ferrier, Grenoble, France, 1993
- Light Waves, Fleeting White Space, Anvers, Belgium, 1994.
- Bassin d'essais des carènes, DCN, Val de Reuil, France, 1994
- Volume et Espace – Sara Holt, Institut Cochin de Génétique Moléculaire, Paris. 1995
- Sara Holt, Artothèque d'Angers, Angers, France, 2003
- Galerie Edouard Edwards, Paris, 2010
- October 2018, Sara Holt and Jean-Max Albert, Galerie Mercier & Associés, Paris, 2018

== Public works ==
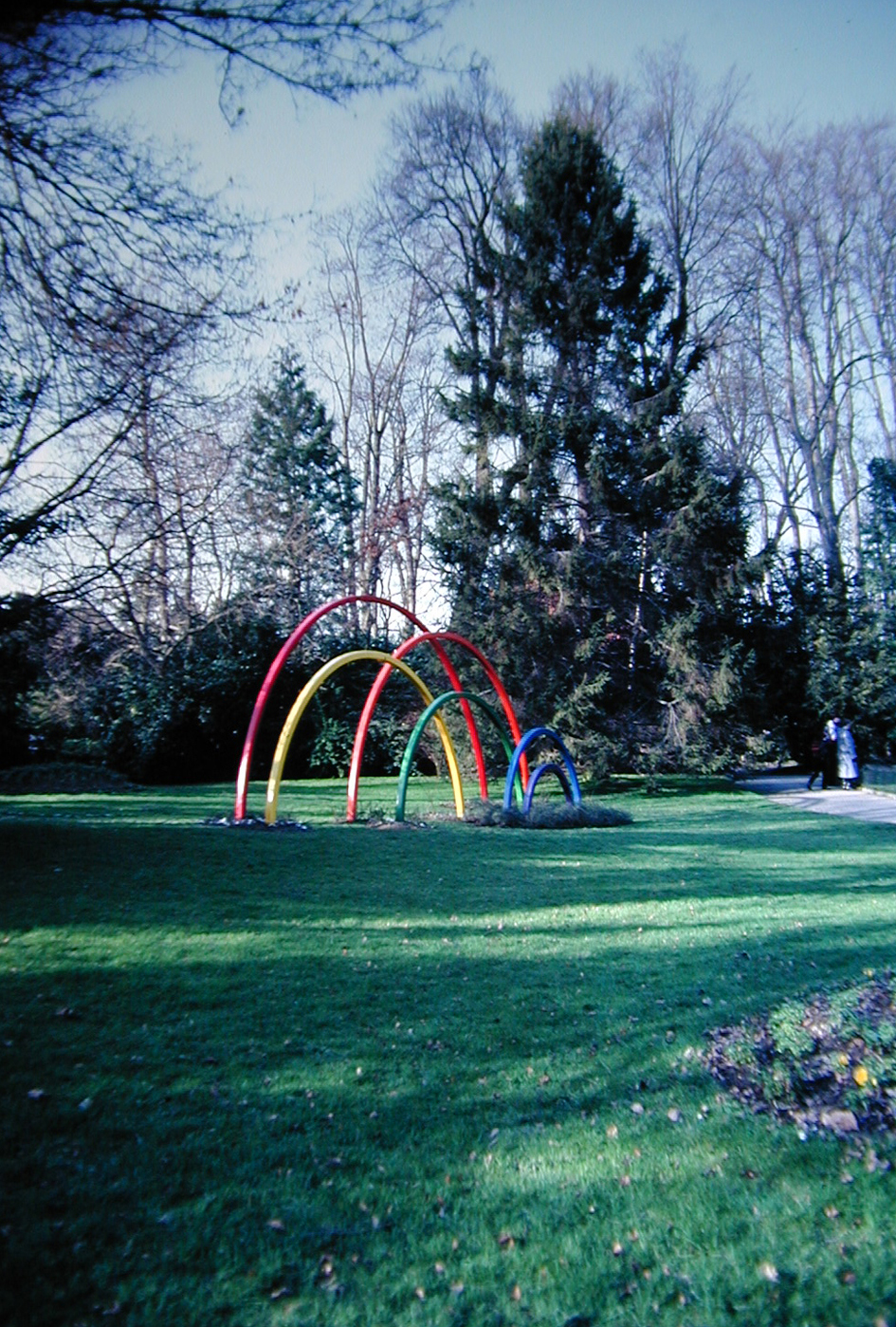
Exploded Rainbow Caen, 1982

- Douze Cônes, Quartier de la Noue, Bagnolet, France, 1972
- Arc-en-ciel, Sens, France, 1976
- Cônes lever et coucher du soleil, Joigny, France, 1977
- Double Rainbow, Pasadena, California, 1977
- Solaris, Chevigny-St. Sauveur, France, 1979
- Arc-en-ciel éclaté, Jardin des Plantes, Caen, France, 1982
- Quatre plafonds, Nice-Étoile, Nice, France, 1982
- Light Ray, SAN de Sénart, Lieusaint, France, 1987
- La chambre de la lune, Centre National des Arts Plastiques, Château d'Oiron, France, 1993
- Auriga, (collaboration avec Jean-Max Albert), Rond-point Montaigne, Angers, France, 1995

== Public collections ==
- Städtische Kunstsammlungen, Ludwigshafen, Germany, 1972
- Fond Régional d'Art Contemporain de Basse-Normandie, 1977
- Musée d'Art Moderne de la Ville de Paris, 1980
- Fond National d'Art Contemporain, Paris, 1983
- FRAC de Poitou-Charente, 1984
- Artothèque d'Angers, 1985
- Centre National d'Arts Plastiques, Château d'Oiron, 1993

== Publications ==
- Sara Holt/ Carole Naggar, Night Light, Editions Pierre Bordas & Fils, Paris, November 1979. ISBN 2-86311-008-X (br.)
- Sara Holt, Sculptures et photos, texts by Henri-Alexis Baatsch et Jean-Christophe Bailly, Grafica Gutenberg, Bergamo, Italy, October 1980.
