= Parc de la Villette =

Public park in Paris, France

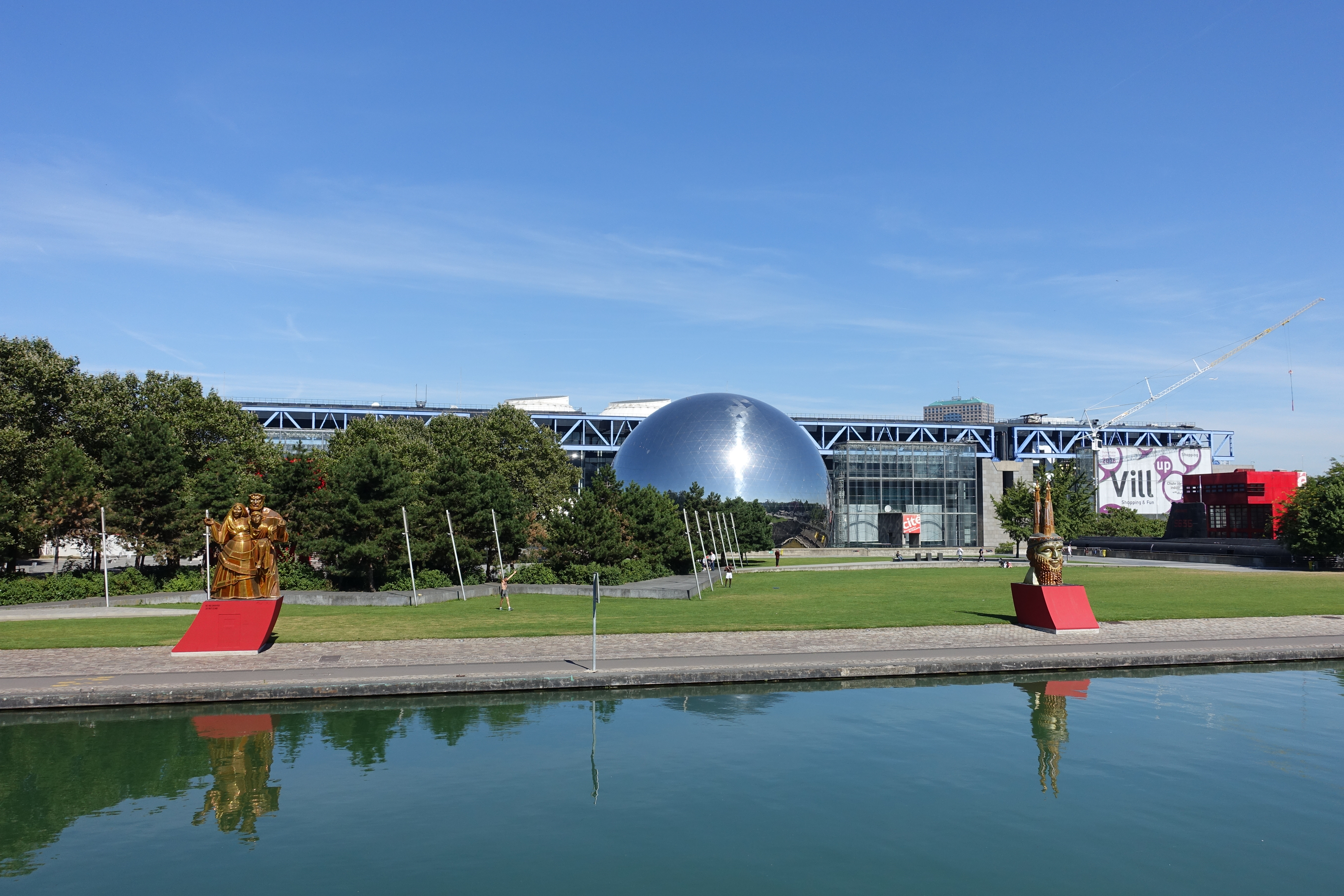
Parc de la Villette with the Cité des Sciences and the Géode in the background

The Parc de la Villette (French pronunciation: [paʁk də la vilɛt]) is the third-largest park in Paris, 55.5 hectares (137 acres) in area, located at the northeastern edge of the city in the 19th arrondissement. The park houses one of the largest concentrations of cultural venues in Paris, including the Cité des Sciences et de l'Industrie (City of Science and Industry, Europe's largest science museum), three major concert venues, and the prestigious Conservatoire de Paris.

Parc de la Villette is served by Paris Métro stations Corentin Cariou on Line 7 and Porte de Pantin on Line 5.

== History ==
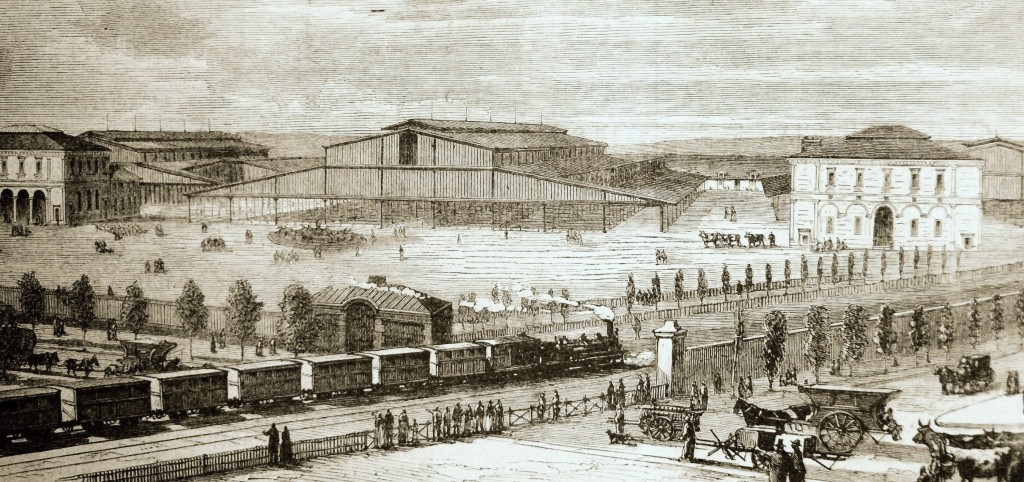
The abattoir at La Villette at its opening in 1867

The park was designed by Bernard Tschumi, a French architect of Swiss origin, who built it from 1984 to 1987 in partnership with Colin Fournier, on the site of the huge Parisian abattoirs (slaughterhouses) and the national wholesale meat market, as part of an urban redevelopment project. The slaughterhouses, built in 1867 on the instructions of Napoléon III, had been cleared away and relocated in 1974. Tschumi won a major design competition in 1982–83 for the park as part of the Grands Projets of François Mitterrand, and sought the opinions of the deconstructionist philosopher Jacques Derrida in the preparation of his design proposal.

Since the creation of the park, museums, concert halls, and theatres have been designed by several noted contemporary architects, including Christian de Portzamparc, Adrien Fainsilber, Philippe Chaix, Jean-Paul Morel, Gérard Chamayou, on to Mr. Tschumi.

== Park attractions ==
Plan of the Parc de la Villette

The park houses museums, concert halls, live performance stages, and theatres, as well as playgrounds for children, and thirty-five architectural follies. These include:

- Cité des Sciences et de l'Industrie (City of Science and Industry), the largest science museum in Europe; home of the former Vill'Up, a shopping centre opened in November 2016 and closed in 2023 for redevelopment, he had the world's largest indoor pulsed-air free fall flight simulator, 14 m high, and several cinemas, including IMAX, 4DX and dynamic cinema. Vill'Up was later redeveloped as Boom Boom Villette, a food and leisure market that opened in January 2024.
- La Géode, an IMAX theatre inside of a 36 metres (118 ft) diameter geodesic dome;
- Cité de la musique (City of Music), a museum of historical musical instruments with a concert hall, also home of the Conservatoire de Paris;
- Philharmonie de Paris, a new symphony hall with 2,400 seats for orchestral works, jazz, and world music designed by Jean Nouvel, opened since January 2015.
- Grande halle de la Villette, a historical cast iron & glass abattoir that now holds fairs, festive cultural events, and other programming;

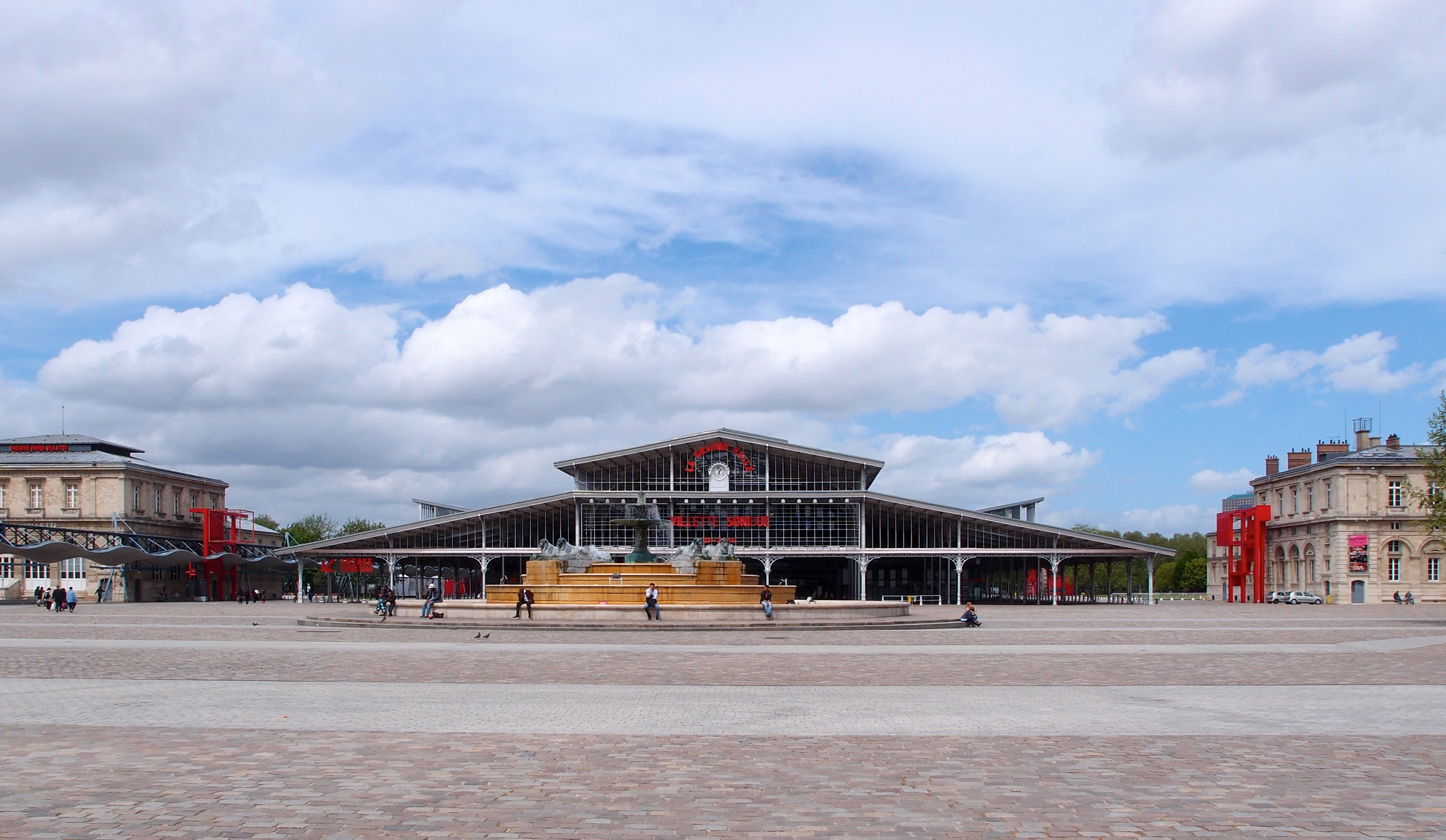
The Grande halle de la Villette, site of fairs and cultural events and the Théâtre Paris-Villette on the left

Footbridge leading to the Philharmonie de Paris symphony hall

- Le Zénith, a concert arena with 6,300 seats for rock and pop music;
- L'Argonaute, a 50 m-long (160 ft) decommissioned military submarine;
- Cabaret Sauvage, a flexible small concert stage with 600 to 1,200 seats, designed by Méziane Azaïche in 1997;
- Le Trabendo, a contemporary venue for pop, rock, folk music, and jazz with 700 seats;
- Théâtre Paris-Villette, a small actors' theatre and acting workshop with 211 seats;
- Le Hall de la Chanson (at Pavillon du Charolais), theatre dedicated to French song with 140 seats
- WIP Villette, "Work In Progress–Maison de la Villette," a space dedicated to Hip-Hop culture, social theatre, art work initiatives, and cultural democracy;
- Espace Chapiteaux, a 4,200 square metres (45,000 sq ft) permanent space under a tent for contemporary circus, resident and touring companies perform;
- Pavillon Paul-Delouvrier, a chic contemporary event space for conferences, workshops, and social events designed by Oscar Tusquets;
- Centre équestre de la Villette, equestrian center with numerous year-round events.
- Cinéma en plein air, an outdoor movie theatre, site of an annual film festival;

Le TARMAC (former Théâtre de l'Est Parisien), venue for world performance art and dance companies touring from "La Francophonie", has moved to 159 avenue Gambetta in the 20th arrondissement.

== Tourism ==
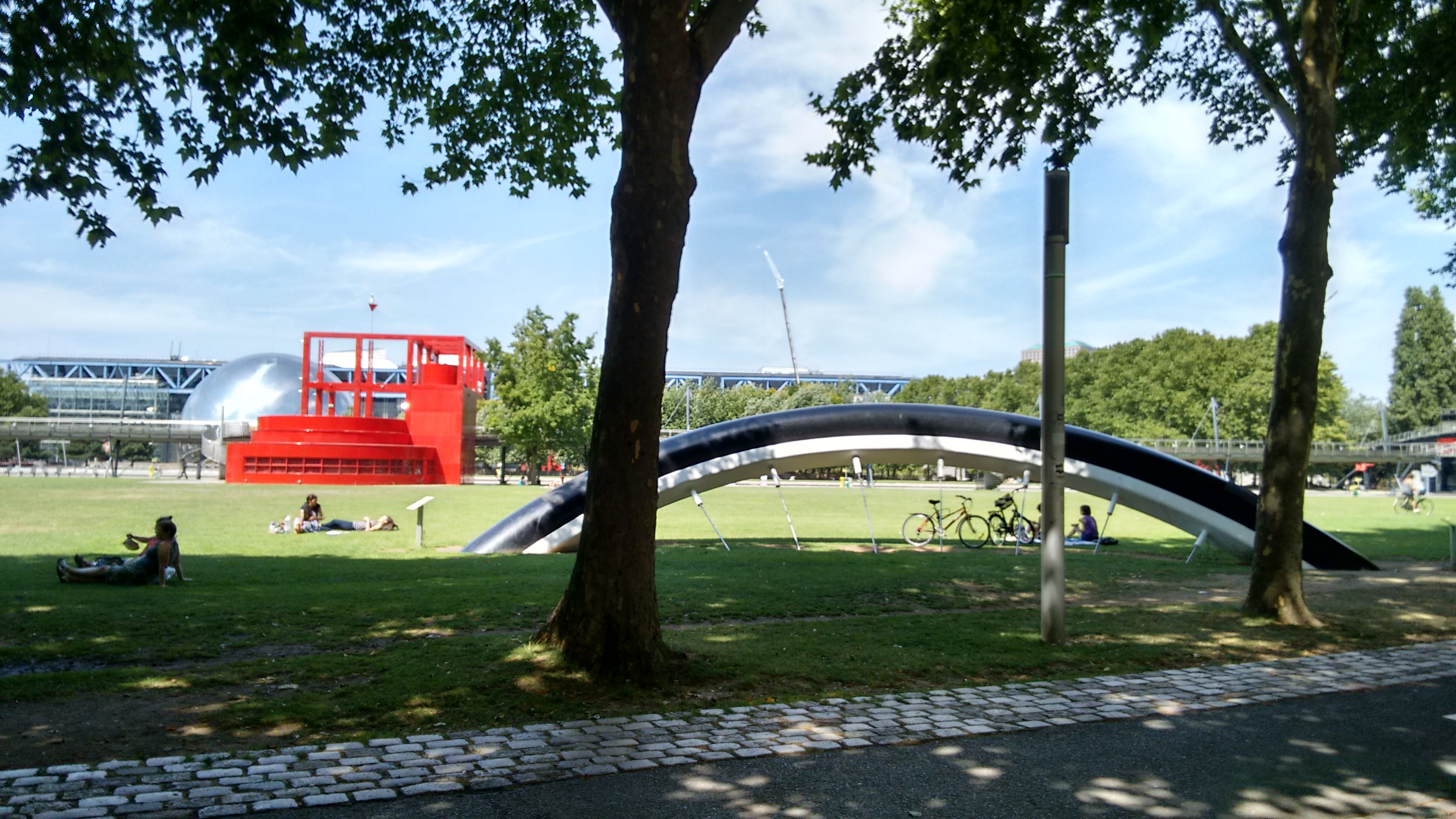
Sculpture La bicyclette ensevelie by Claes Oldenburg and Coosje van Bruggen, 1990; red folly and Géode in the distance.

Since its completion in 1987, the Parc de la Villette has become a popular attraction for Paris residents and international travelers alike. An estimated 10 million people visit the park each year to take part in an array of cultural activities. With its collection of museums, theatres, architectural follies, themed gardens, and open spaces for exploration and activity, the park has created an area that relates to both adults and children.

Designed by Bernard Tschumi, the park is meant to be a place inspired by the post-modernist architectural ideas of deconstructivism. Tschumi's design was in partial response to the philosophies of Jacques Derrida, acting as an architectural experiment in space (through a reflection on Plato's Khôra), form, and how those relate a person's ability to recognize and interact. According to Tschumi, the intention of the park was to create space for activity and interaction, rather than adopt the conventional park mantra of ordered relaxation and self-indulgence. The vast expanse of the park allows for visitors to walk about the site with a sense of freedom and opportunity for exploration and discovery.

The design of the park is organized into a series of points, lines, and surfaces. These categories of spatial relation and formulation are used in Tschumi's design to act as a means of deconstructing the traditional views of how a park is conventionally meant to exist.

== Activities ==
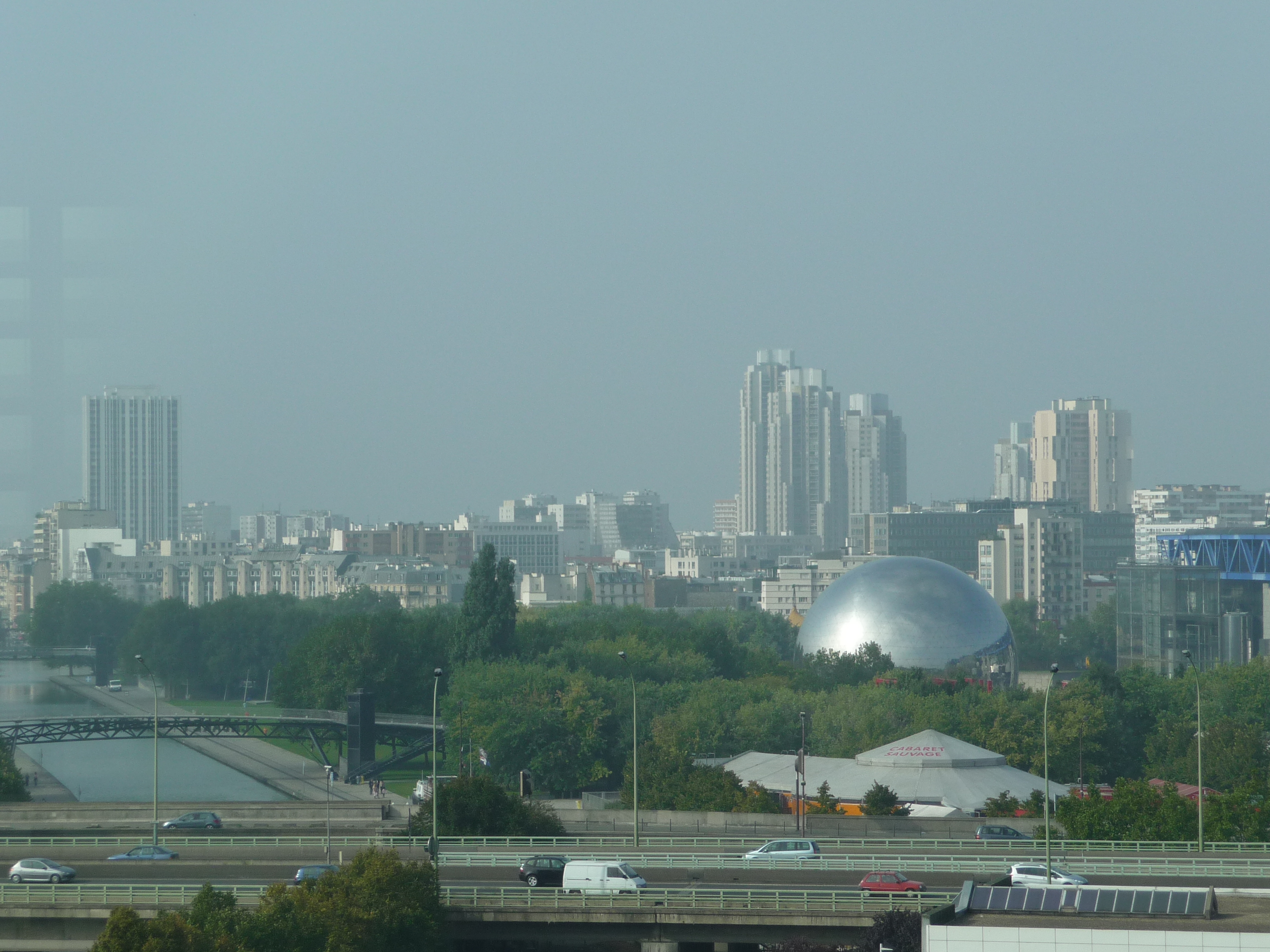
The Cabaret Sauvage concert venue, in the foreground, designed by Méziane Azaïche, 1997 with the Géode behind.

The Parc de la Villette boasts activities that engage all people of all ages and cultural backgrounds. The park is a contemporary melting pot of cultural expression where local artists and musicians produce exhibits and performances. On the periphery of the park lies the Cité des Sciences et de l'Industrie, the largest science museum in Europe. There are a convention center and an I-MAX theatre. The park acts as a connection between these exterior functions. Concerts are scheduled year-round, hosting local and mainstream musicians. Dividing the park is the Canal de l'Ourcq, which has boat tours that transport visitors around the park and to other sites in Paris. Festivals are common in the park along with artist conventions and shows by performers.

The Parc de la Villette hosts an annual open-air film festival. In 2010 the festival's theme was "To Be 20" ("Avoir 20 ans") and featured films about youth and self-discovery around the age of 20. In 2010 films were shown by American filmmakers Woody Allen and Sofia Coppola as well as French and international filmmakers.

== Gardens ==
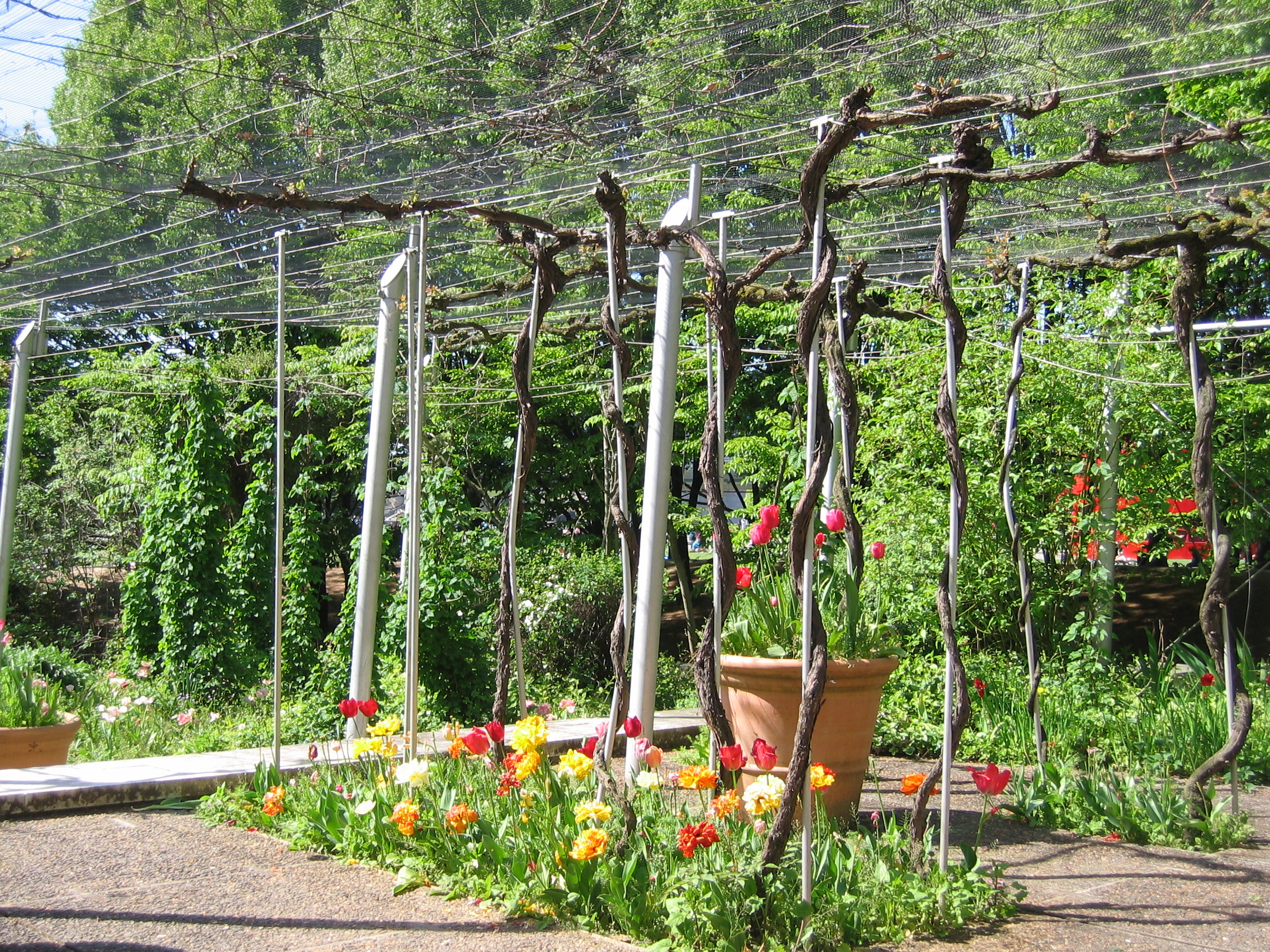
The Jardin de la Treille

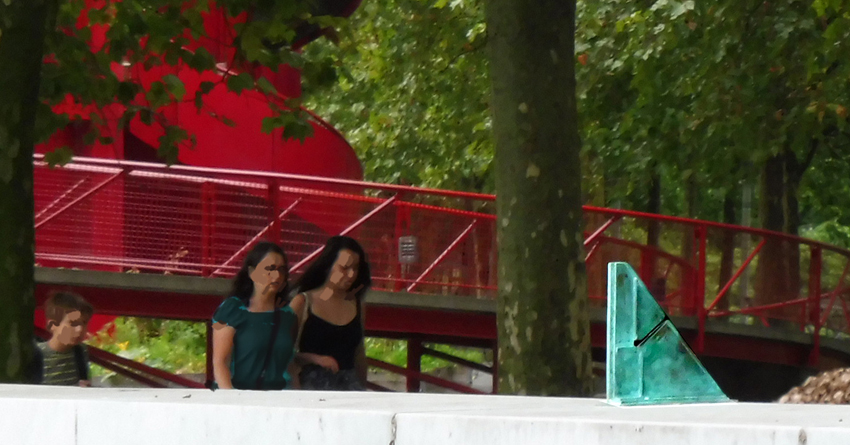
Jean-Max Albert, Sculptures Bachelard, 1986

The Parc de la Villette has a collection of ten themed gardens that attract a large number of the park's visitors. Each garden is created with a different representation of architectural deconstructionism and tries to create space through playfully sculptural and clever means. While some of the gardens are minimalist in design, others are clearly constructed with children in mind.

The "Jardin du Dragon" (The Garden of the Dragon) is home to a large sculptural steel dragon that has an 80-foot slide for children to play on.

The "Jardin de Bambou" (Bamboo Garden) at the Parc de la Villette was designed by Alexandre Chemetoff, winner of the Grand Prix de l'urbanisme (2000).

The "Jardin de la Treille" (Trellis Garden) was designed by Gilles Vexlard and Laurence Vacherot. Vines and creepers grow along a roof trellis and 90 small, hidden fountains produce a subtle murmur while irrigating the grape vines. 7 Sculptures de visées (Sculptures Bachelard) by Jean-Max Albert are installed throughout and an anamorphosis reflection is displayed in a small pool.

The gardens range in function; where some gardens are meant for active engagement, others exist to play off of curiosity and investigation or merely allow for relaxation.

== Follies ==
Probably the most iconic pieces of the park, the follies act as architectural representations of deconstruction. In architecture, a folly (in French, folie) is a building constructed primarily for decoration, but suggesting by its appearance some other purpose, or so extravagant that it transcends the normal range of garden ornaments or other class of building to which it belongs. Architecturally, the follies are meant to act as points of reference that help visitors gain a sense of direction and navigate throughout the space. Twenty-six follies, made of metal and painted bright red, are placed on a grid and offer a distinct organization to the park. Each is identified by a name and a code letter-number.

Architecturally, the follies are meant to act as points of reference that help visitors gain a sense of direction and navigate throughout the space. While the follies are meant to exist in a deconstructive vacuum without historical relation, many have found connections between the steel structures and the previous buildings that were part of the old industrial fabric of the area. Today, the follies remain as cues to organization and direction for park visitors. Some of them house restaurants, information centers, and other functions associated with the park's needs.

== Architectural deconstructivism and the park ==
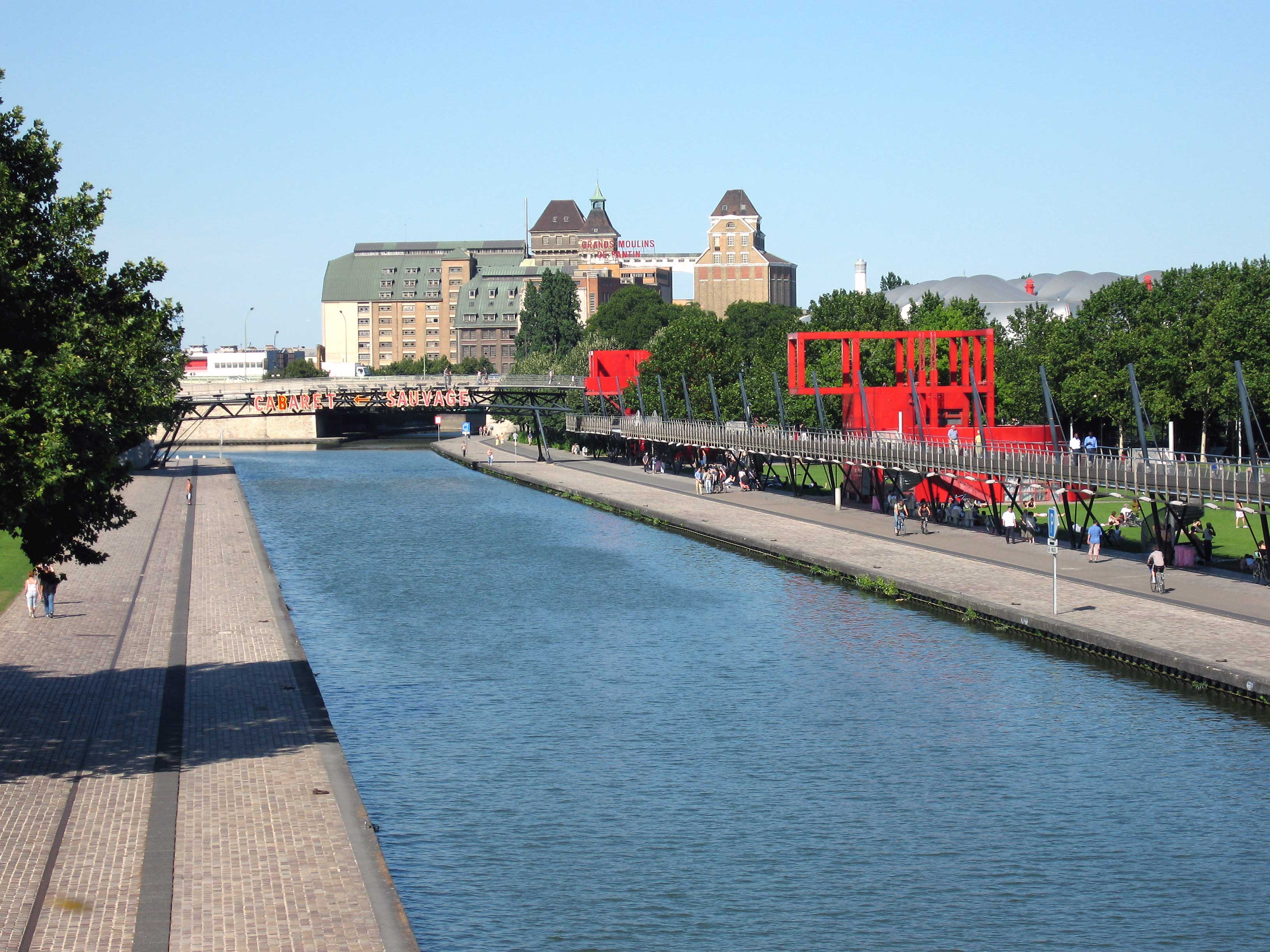
Footbridges and "follies" along the Canal de l'Ourcq with Le Zénith then the Grands Moulins de Pantin in the background

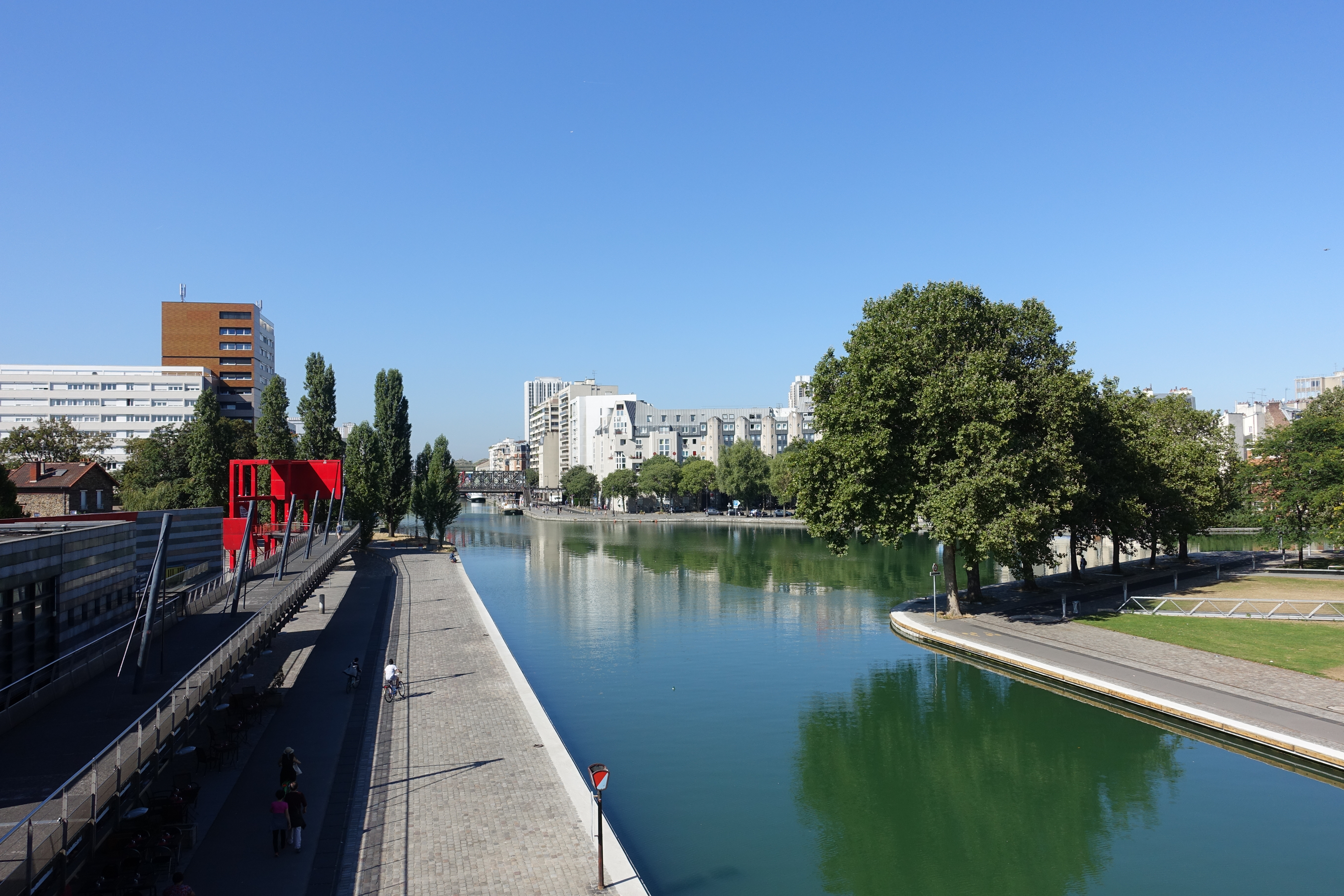
Opposite view with the junction of Canal de l'Ourcq and Canal Saint-Denis.

There have been many criticisms of the innovative design of the park since its original completion. To some, the park has little concern with the human scale of park functions and the vast open space seem to challenge the expectation that visitors may have of an urban park. Bernard Tschumi designed the Parc de la Villette with the intention of creating a space that exists in a vacuum, something without historical precedent. The park strives to strip down the signage and conventional representations that have infiltrated architectural design and allow for the existence of a "non-place." This non-place, envisioned by Tschumi, is the most appropriate example of space and provides a truly honest relationship between the subject and the object.

Visitors view and react to the plan, landscaping, and sculptural pieces without the ability to cross-reference them with previous works of historical architecture. The design of the park capitalizes on the innate qualities that are illustrated within architectural deconstructivism. By allowing visitors to experience the architecture of the park within this constructed vacuum, the time, recognitions, and activities that take place in that space begin to acquire a more vivid and authentic nature. The park is not acting as a spectacle; it is not an example of traditional park design such as New York City's Central Park. The Parc de la Villette strives to act as merely a frame for other cultural interaction.

The park embodies anti-tourism, not allowing visitors to breeze through the site and pick and choose the sites they want to see. Upon arrival in the park, visitors are thrust into a world that is not defined by conventional architectural relationships. The frame of the park, due to its roots in deconstructivism, tries to change and react to the functions that it holds within.

== See also ==
- List of tourist attractions in Paris
- World Architecture Survey
