= Nils-Udo =

German artist from Bavaria (born 1937)

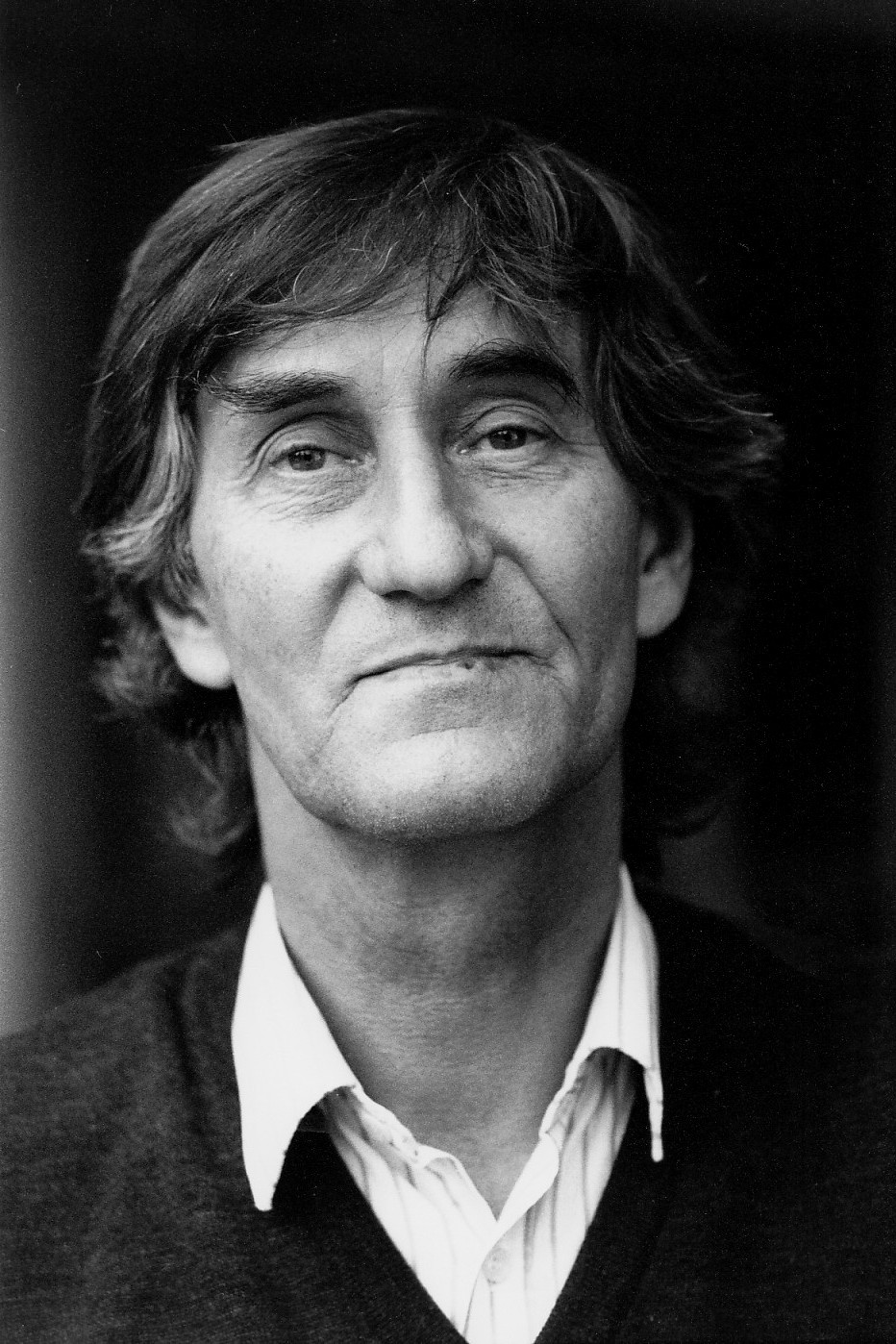
- Nils-Udo in 1993
- Born: 1937 (age 88–89); Lauf an der Pegnitz, Germany
- Known for: Sculpture; photography
- Movement: spray painting and Land art

Nils-Udo (born 1937) is a German artist from Bavaria who has been creating environmental art since the 1960s when he moved away from painting and the studio and began to work with, and in, nature. He began in the 1960s as a painter on traditional surfaces, in Paris, but moved to his home country in Bavaria and started to plant creations, putting them in Nature's hands to develop, and eventually disappear. As his work became more ephemeral, Udo introduced photography as part of his art to document and share it. Perhaps the best known example of his work for the general public is the cover design for Peter Gabriel's OVO. Nils-Udo seeks to offer a mutualist vision wherein nature as environment is an omnipresent backdrop. In revealing the diversity in a specific environment, he establishes links between human and natural history, between nature and humanity that are always there, yet seldom recognized. Nils-Udo uses natural materials, such as sticks, petals, branches, to create site-specific installations.

== Selected works and projects ==
=== OVO (2000) ===
Peter Gabriel contacted Nils Udo to create an installation for the cover for his new album OVO. Udo created a nest-like structure supported by tree trunks, which made it very heavy. Inside the nest lay the child of a Real World (Studio in England where the album was recorded) employee (The child, Josh, is the son of Susie Millns at Real World’s Art department). The photograph was taken and then the installation was moved into Peter Gabriels's garden nearby. Finally due to issues of what to do with it, the gardener set the structure on fire. This did not upset Udo as his work is transient and there is a photograph that keeps the artwork still living. Its called OVO because it has an OVO form.

=== Rock-Time-Man (2001) ===
Rock-Time-Man is a monumental sculpture in Wittgensteiner-Sauerland, Germany. Udo creates the effect of an ancient temple by installing in the middle of the structure an enormous cube of rock framed by a monumental architectural trunk form made out of wood. The quartzite monolith weighs almost 150 tons and, integrated into the peaceful grandeur of the forest, it forms a monument and memorial in its own right: its size, its timeless association with the earth, and its uniqueness. When exposed to this powerful entity, the viewer experiences his/her own temporality and vulnerability.

=== Radeau d'Automne (2013–2014) ===
The community of d’Éguzon-Chantôme and Crozant had the desire of local authorities to initiate artistic and cultural projects in a remote rural areas based on the environmental qualities of its sites. Udo proposed Radeau d' Automne as a monumental sculpture designed with natural materials. In the shape of a stylized maple half-leaf, 6.80 meters long and 3.90 meters high, the work is built in round trunks with light chestnut wood, assembled "with the old "tenons, mortises and ankles. This traditional, solid and aesthetic blend, as well as the use of a local essence and strong identity, reinforces the link to the territory. It was here to give shape to a space, the space of the valley of the Creuse, marked by the history of pictorial currents of the nineteenth century. and 20th century. and thus exposing himself to a new reading, to a new look: the wooden raft and water, leaf reflecting on the river at the foot of the granite ruins and recalling the steep ridges of the surrounding landscape. When asked about this work Udo responded “Even if I work parallel to nature and only intervene with the greatest possible care, a basic internal contradiction remains. It is a contradiction that underlies all of my work, which itself can’t escape the inherent fatality of our existence. It harms what it touches : the virginity of nature… To realize what is possible and latent in Nature, to literally realize what has never existed, utopia becomes reality. A second life suffices. The event has taken place. I have only animated it and made it visible.”

=== Other Important Works ===
- Tower: Benthelm sandstone, Nordhorn, Germany, 1982
- Waterhouse: spruce trunks, birch branches, willow switches and sod on tidal flats, Waddensee mudflats, Holland, 1982
- Chestnut leaf, vetch flowers, pond, Vassiviere, Limousin, France, 1986
- Bindweed flowers held in their journey on a stream by a stick dam. Reunion, Indian Ocean, 1990.
- Robinia Leaf Swing: Robinia leaf halved, ash twigs, Valle de Sella, Italy, 1992.
- The Blue Flower: Landscape for heinrich von Ofterdingen, planting of 10,000 wildflowers in Munich, Germany, 1993–96.
- Tadpole Willow: Fern leaves and mud, view of site specific work in Marchiennes, France, 1994.
- Root-Sculpture, Mexico City, 1995
- Red Rock Nest: Bamboo, earth, oranges, limes, and lemons, site-specific work, Topanga Canyon, California. Commissioned by ecoartspace, 1998
- Dune Edge: pampas grass, sand, wind—Namibia, 2001
  - Lost in the immensity of the mountainous red sand dunes of Namibia. One of the oldest deserts in the world. Not a breath of wind, not a sound. The tracks of a solitary gazelle crisscross the huge immaculate hollow at the foot of one gigantic dune. The shadow of late afternoon sun rapidly draws closer. – Nils Udo
- The Nest: National Garden Show, Munich, Germany, 2005
- Sella Nest: Spruce logs and white marble, Valle di Sella, Italy, 2008
- Entrance: Mountain Bluets, Pigment print 135x180 cm, Pyrenees, 2018

== Bibliography ==
- Nils-Udo: Art In Nature, 2002, ISBN 2-08-010891-3
- Le maïs, 1996, ISBN 2-908650-32-0
- Nids, 2003, ISBN 2-7022-0675-1
- Nils-Udo: sur l'eau, 2015, ISBN 978-2-330-05056-6

== Gallery ==
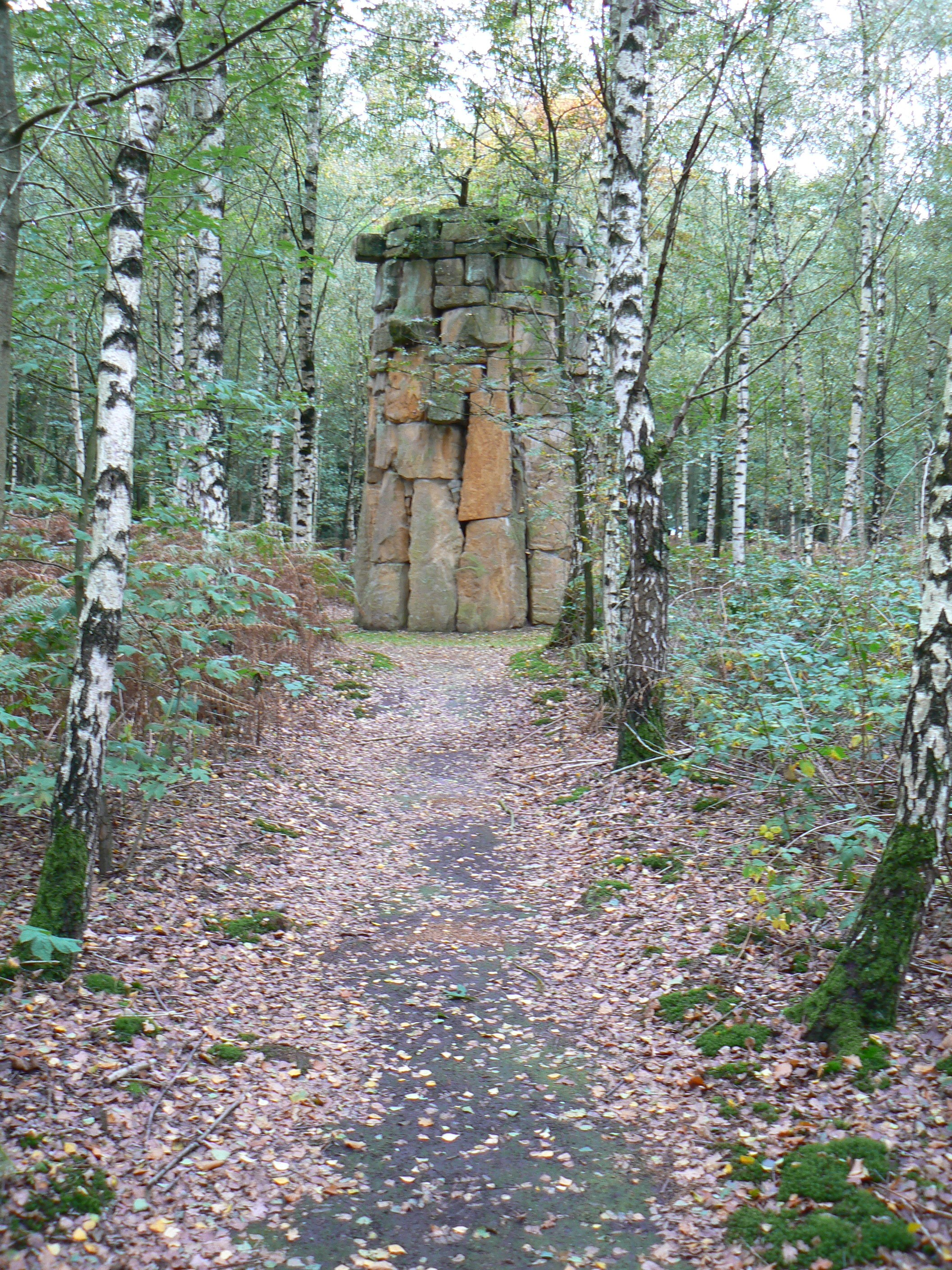

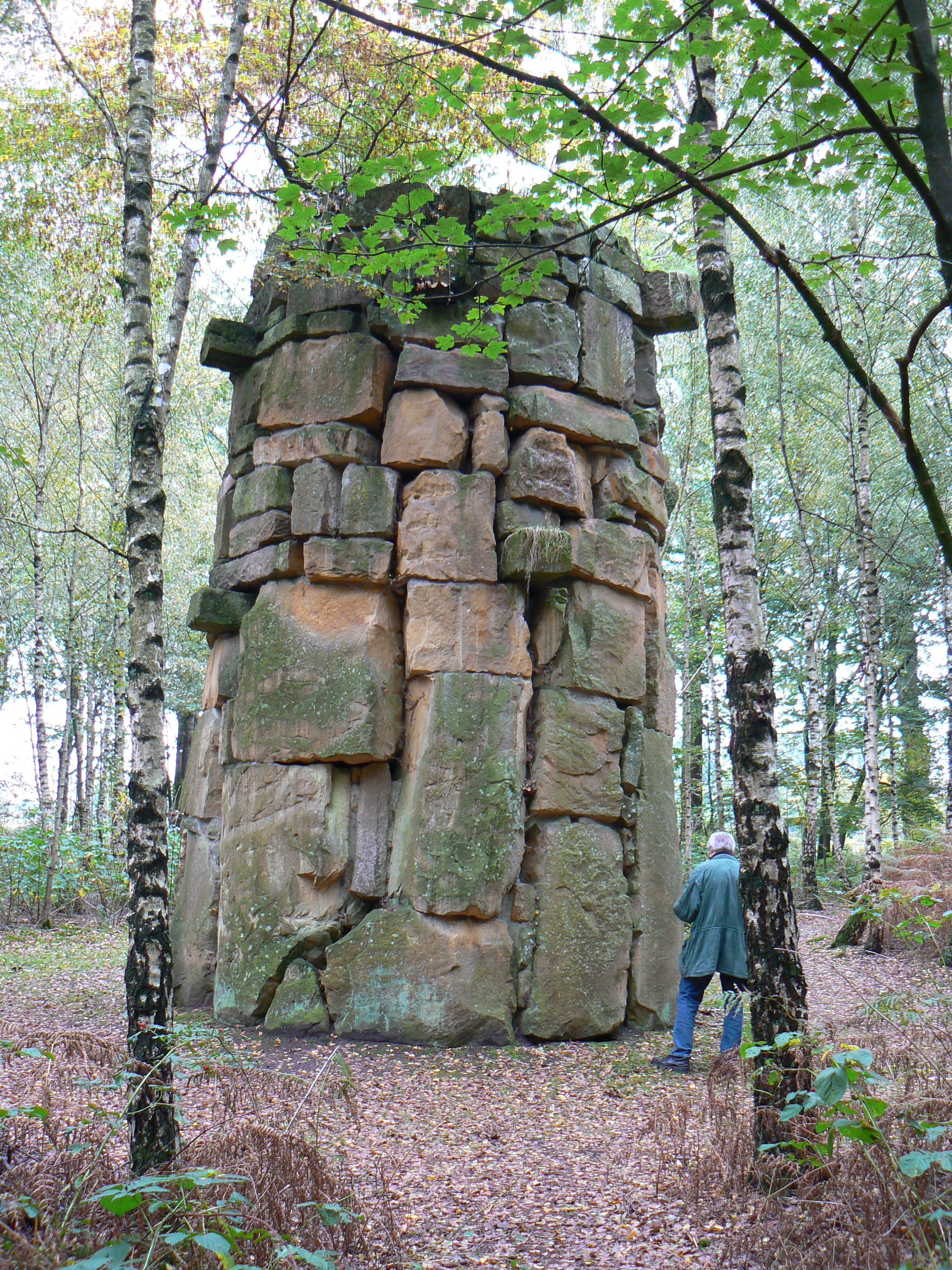

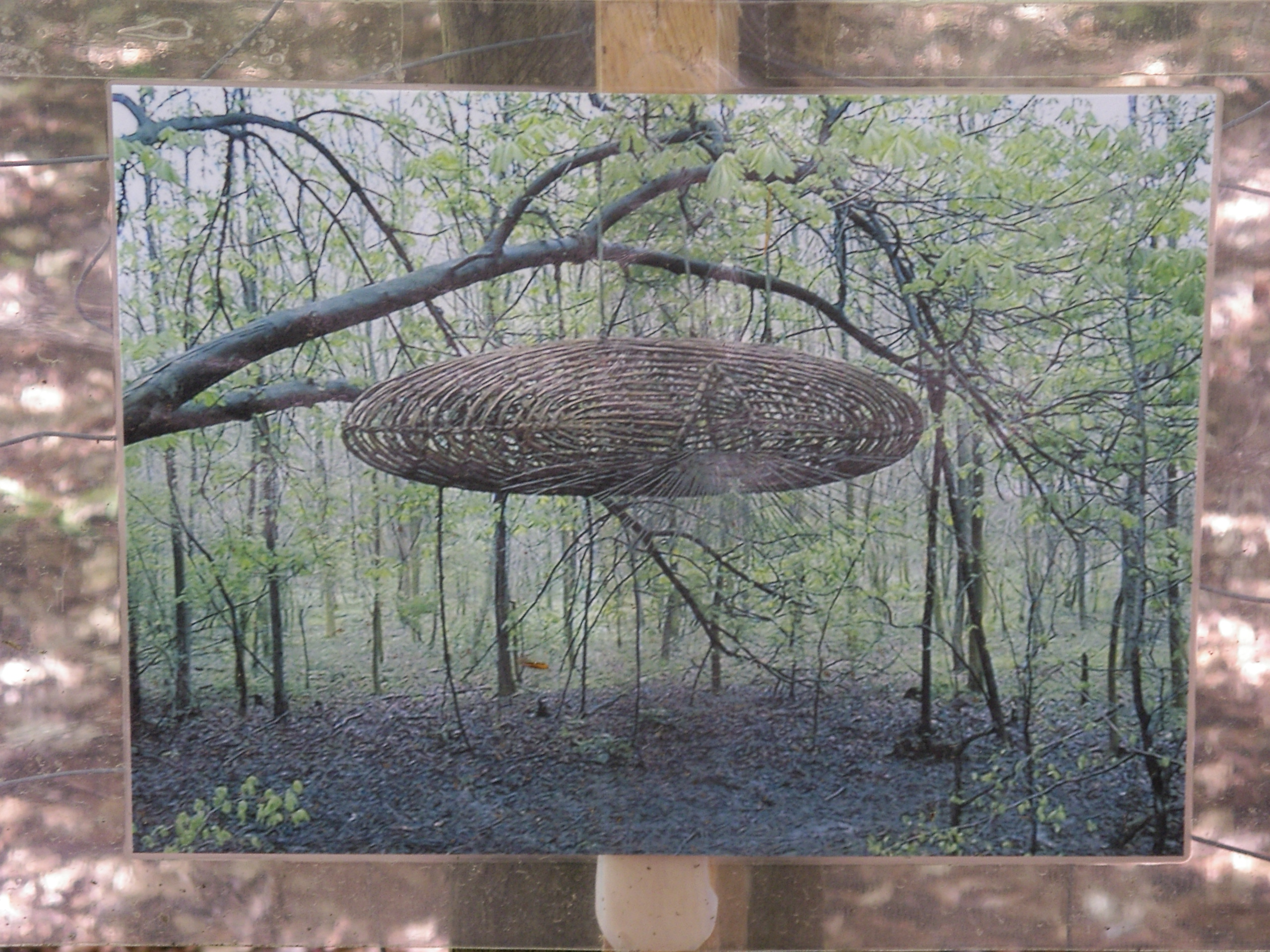

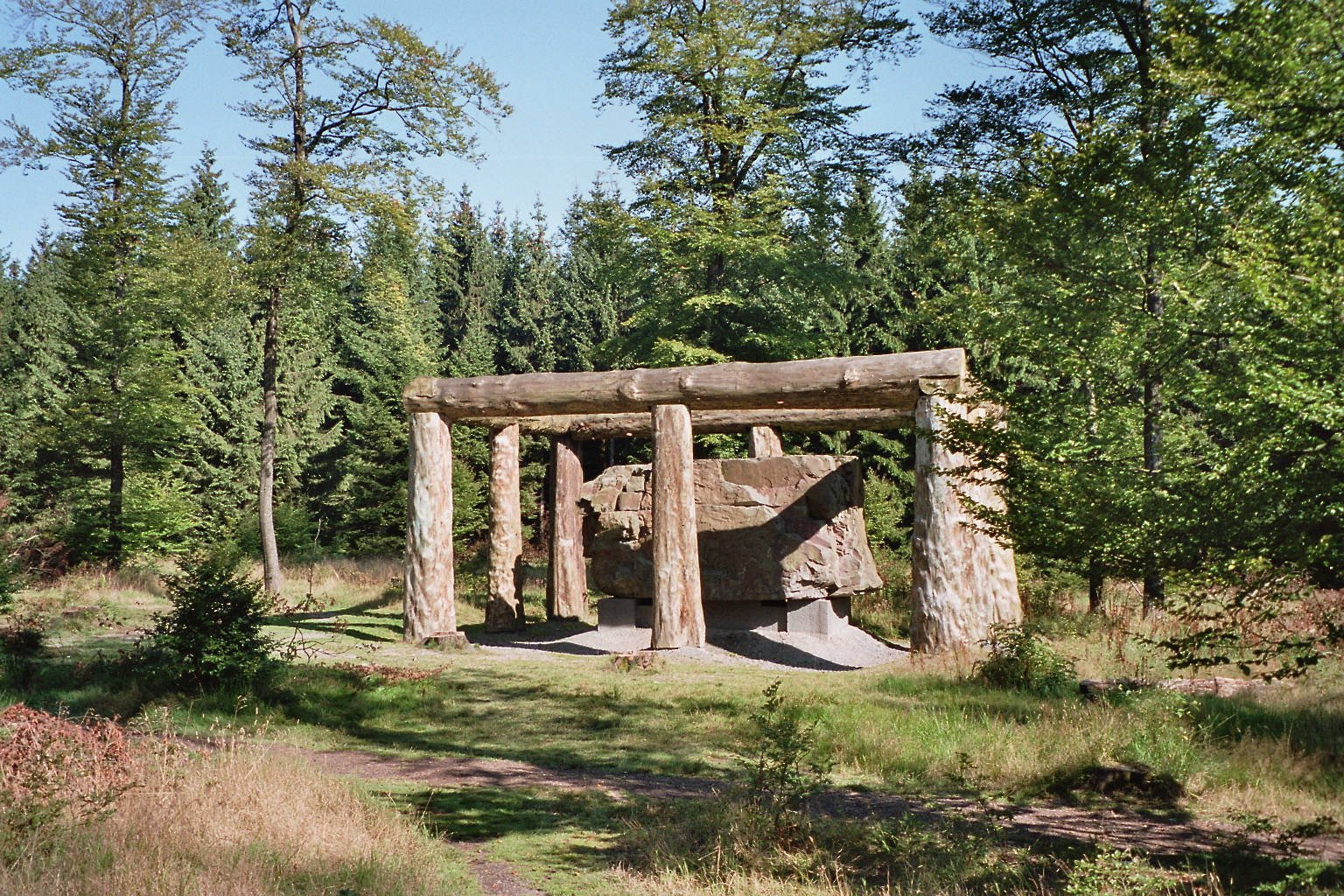

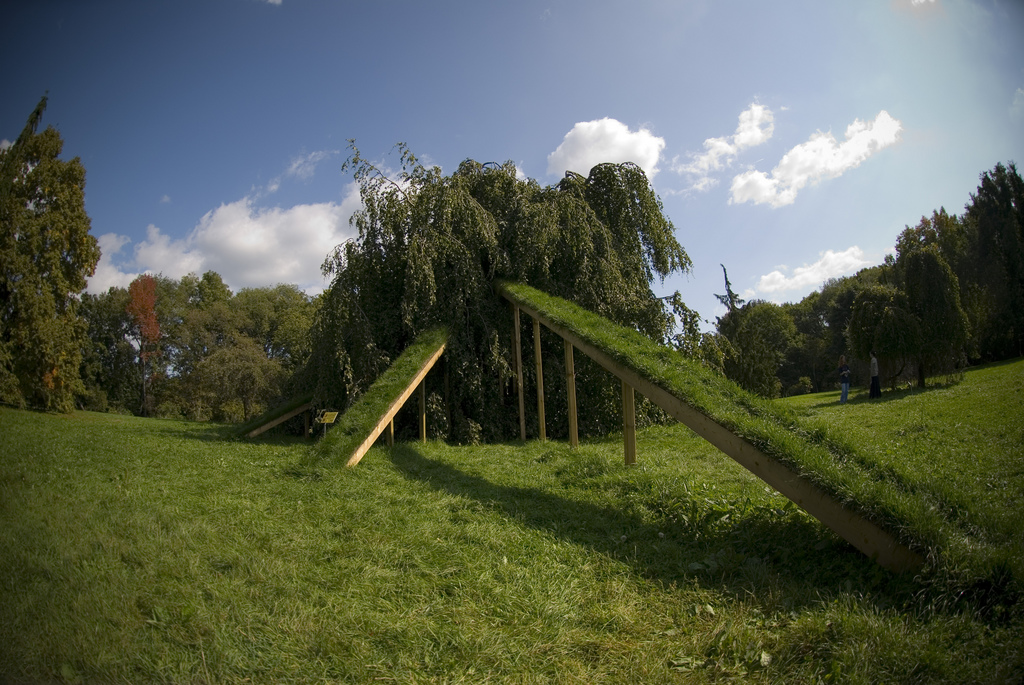

== See also ==
- Andy Goldsworthy
- Environmental art
- Environmental sculpture
- Greenmuseum.org
- Land art
