= Bill Dan =

American sculptor

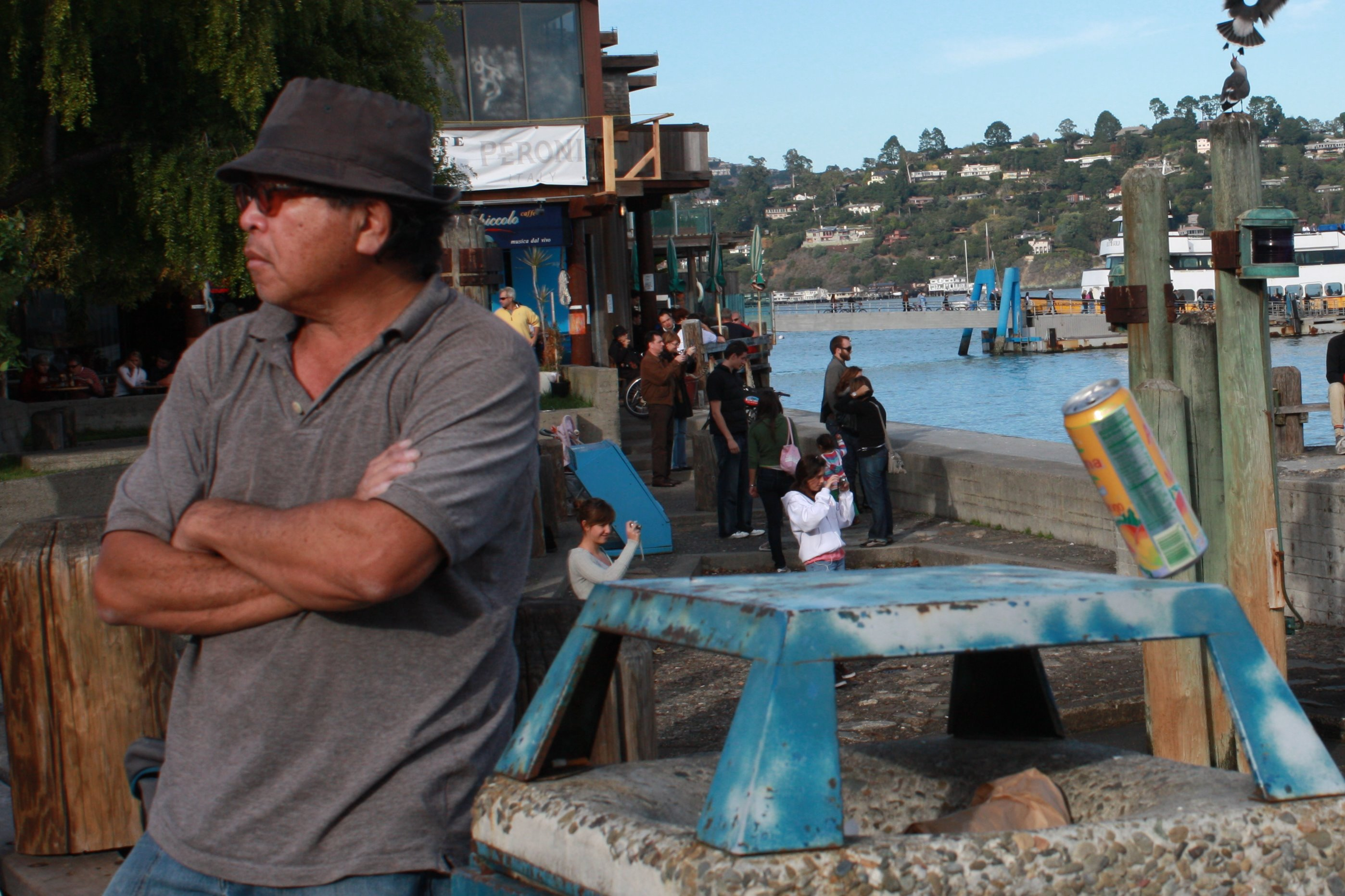
Bill Dan and an empty can just balanced by him, Sausalito, CA. Nov 9, 2008

Bill Dan is a sculptor and performance artist specializing in rock balancing. He creates seemingly impossible, temporary balanced sculptures from un-worked rock and stone in public spaces near his home in San Francisco.

Dan was born in Indonesia, and worked as a warehouseman before discovering the artistic possibilities of rock along the San Francisco Bay shoreline and his emergent skill in manipulating them.

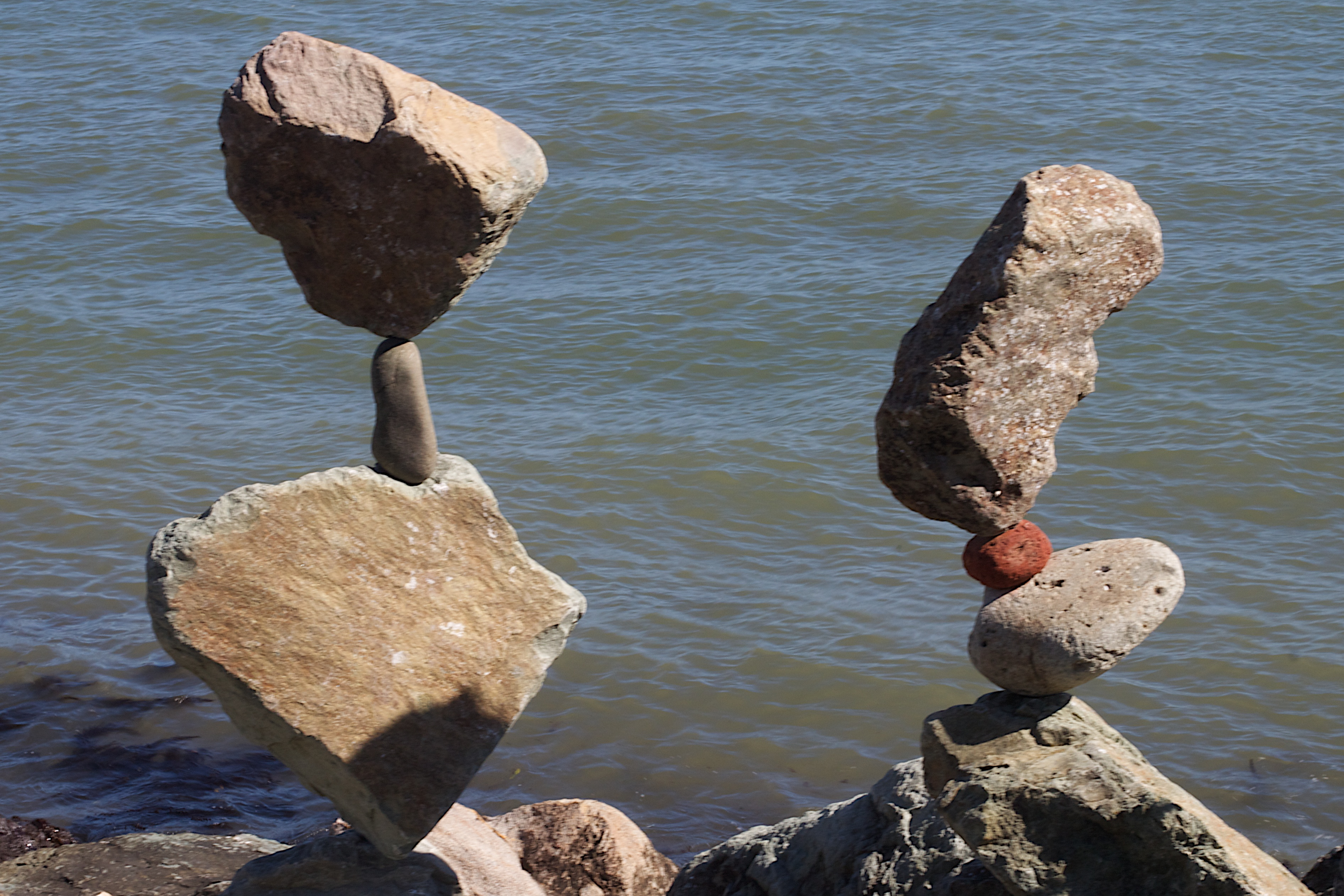
Bill Dan's rock balancing work at Sausalito Ca.

Bill was initially inspired by rock piles he had seen on the Big Island of Hawaii, the cairns of the Inuit, and later by the work of Andy Goldsworthy.

In 2004, he was featured on San Francisco public television station KQED as one of the artists in a show entitled "Collaborations with Nature". Since then, he has been the subject of interviews and shows on TV stations in Japan, Korea, and the Philippines, as well as other U.S. stations.

Photos of his art have appeared in "Coast and Ocean", the magazine of the California Coastal Commission, where he was the subject of a lengthy article, and have been used for book, magazine, and educational materials. He has been a featured presenter with the California Academy of Sciences and the Zeum exploratory space in San Francisco. A DVD compendium of video clips taken of Bill Dan at work by himself, by a professional filmmaker, and by a local amateur, entitled "The First Bill Dan Collection" is currently sold-out.

Bill Dan has frequently been asked about the "meaning" of his work, and he often replies that "Some people try to make things too complicated. This is the opposite."

== See also ==
- Environmental art
- Land art
