= San Francisco Bay Area Film Critics Circle Award for Best Documentary Film =

Annual US film award

San Francisco Film Critics Circle Award for Best Documentary Film
- Country: United States
- Presented by: San Francisco Film Critics Circle
- First award: Thomas Riedelsheimer; Rivers and Tides (2002)
- Currently held by: Alexander Nanau; Collective (2020)
- Website: sffcc.org

The San Francisco Film Critics Circle Award for Best Documentary Film is an award given by the San Francisco Film Critics Circle to honor an outstanding documentary film.

== Winners ==
=== 2000s ===
Year	Winner	Director(s)
2002	Rivers and Tides	Thomas Riedelsheimer
2003	Capturing the Friedmans	Andrew Jarecki
2004	Fahrenheit 9/11	Michael Moore
2005	Grizzly Man	Werner Herzog
2006	An Inconvenient Truth	Davis Guggenheim
2007	No End in Sight	Charles Ferguson
2008	My Winnipeg	Guy Maddin
2009	Anvil! The Story of Anvil	Sacha Gervasi

=== 2010s ===
Year	Winner	Director(s)
2010	The Tillman Story	Amir Bar-Lev
2011	Tabloid	Errol Morris
2012	The Waiting Room	Peter Nicks
2013	The Act of Killing	Joshua Oppenheimer
2014	Citizenfour	Laura Poitras
2015	Listen to Me Marlon	Stevan Riley
2016	I Am Not Your Negro	Raoul Peck
2017	Faces Places	Agnès Varda and JR
2018	Won't You Be My Neighbor?	Morgan Neville
2019	Apollo 11	Todd Douglas Miller

=== 2020s ===
Year	Winner	Director(s)
2020	Collective	Alexander Nanau
2021	Summer of Soul	Questlove (Ahmir Thompson)
