= Rock on Top of Another Rock =

Sculpture by Peter Fischli and David Weiss

Coordinates: 51.5043°N 0.1754°W

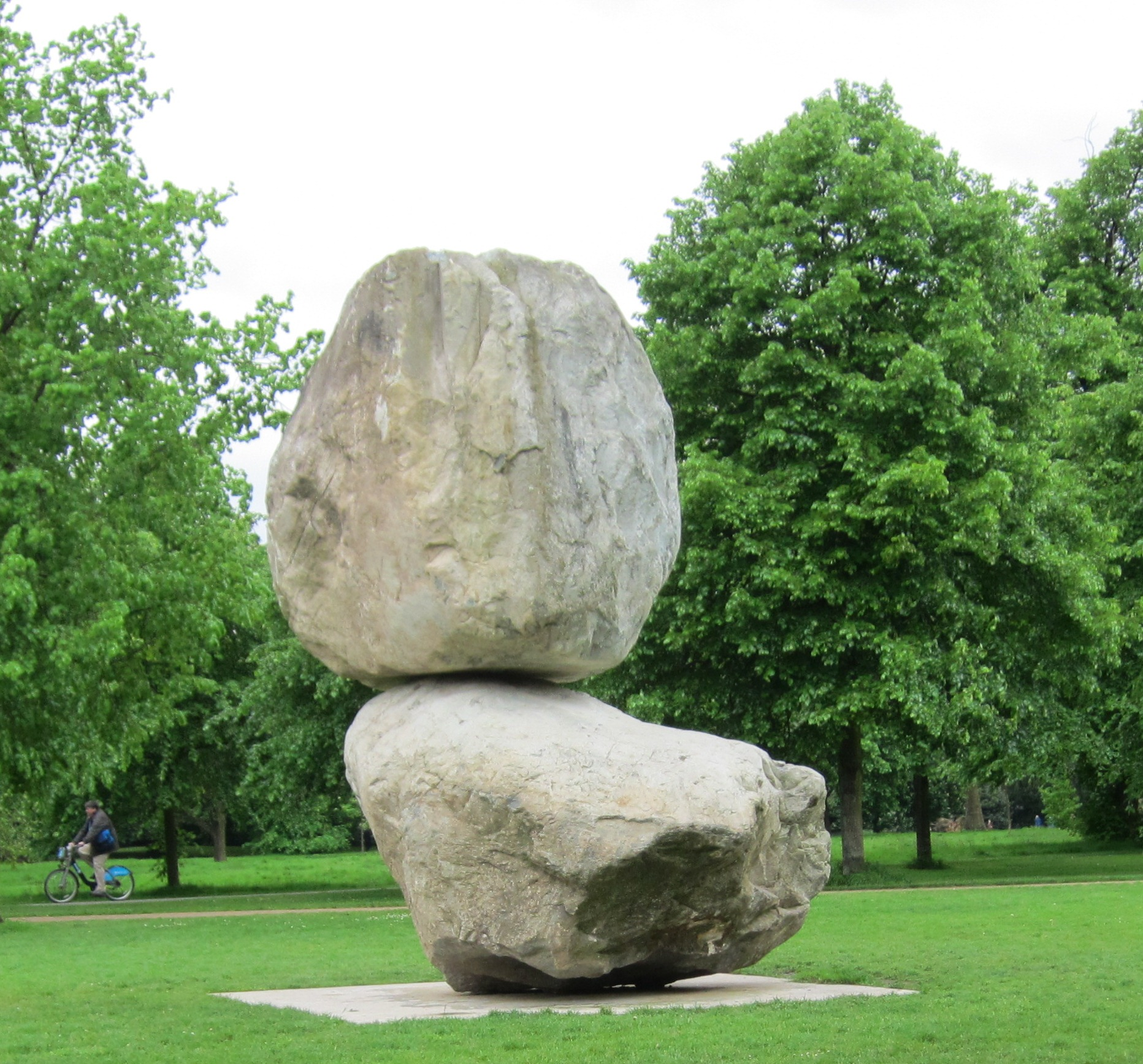
Rock on Top of Another Rock (2013)

Rock on Top of Another Rock is a sculpture by the artists Peter Fischli and David Weiss which was exhibited outside the Serpentine Gallery in Kensington Gardens in 2013. It consists of one large rock balanced on top of another large rock. An earlier incarnation of the work was a similar sculpture on the plateau of Valdresflya which was one of the artworks installed on each of Norway's eighteen scenic highways.

== Inspiration ==
The motto of Fischli and Weiss is "Am schönsten ist das Gleichgewicht, kurz bevor's zusammenbricht"—balance is most beautiful just at the point when it is about to collapse. Fischli spoke about the work at its unveiling in March 2013:

In Norway and here, to put one rock on top of another rock in the wilderness is the first thing you do if you want to make a mark. When you walk and you want to find your way back ... you make this mark. It is a very archaic, simple thing, but it is referencing the Venturi duck. We wanted to make something that forces you to stop your car and get out to take a photograph.

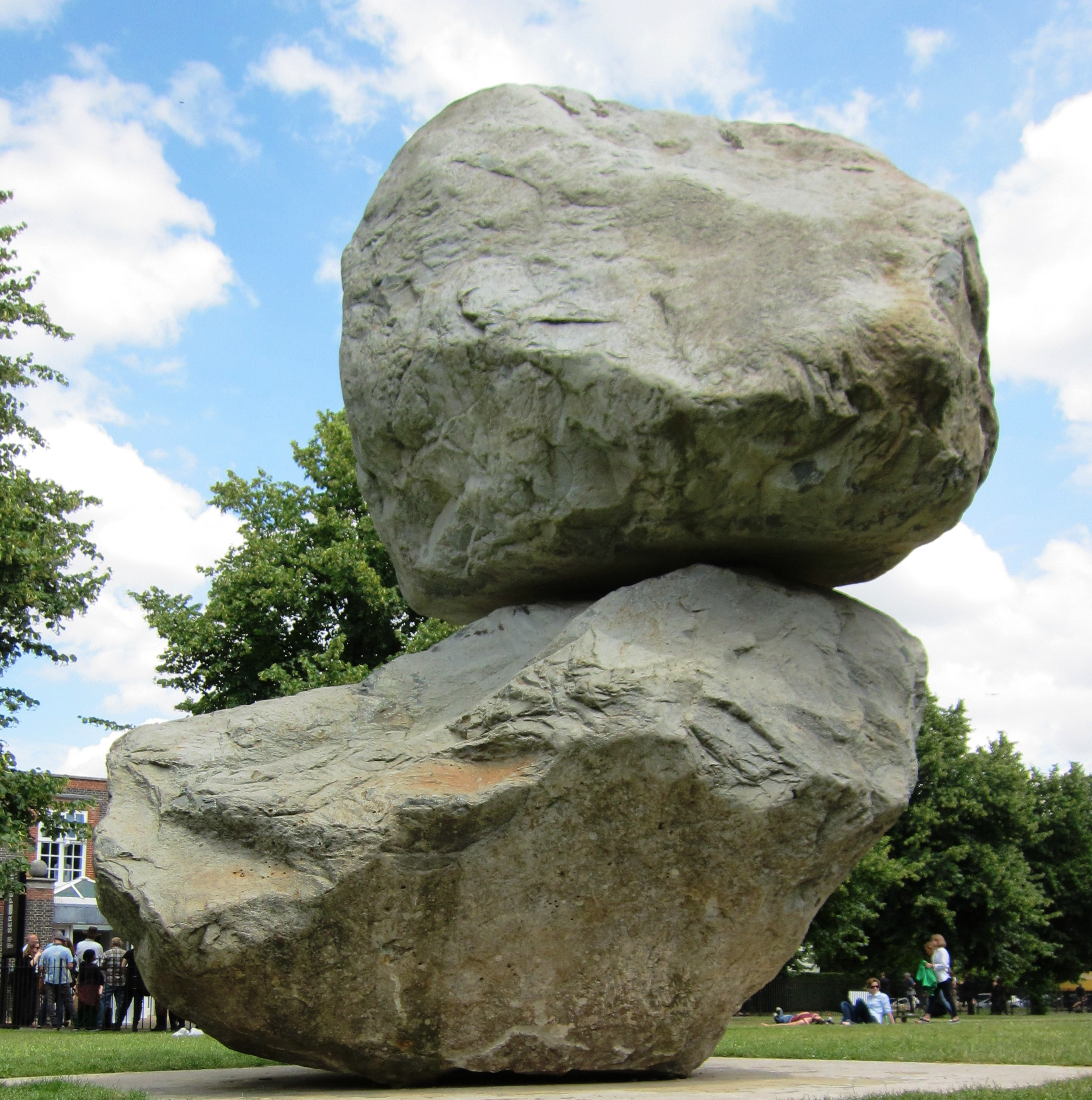

== Construction ==
The first incarnation of the work was constructed for the Norwegian Public Roads Administration which commissioned artworks for its 18 tourist routes. The artists used a picture of a toy Playmobil crane lifting a large rock to illustrate their proposal, which was to place one large rock on top of another. This would be in the style of a wayfarer's cairn—a marker to show that someone had passed this way—but on a grand, monumental scale. In that case, the lower rock was already in place, and a real crane was used to place another rock on top of it.

The two granite boulders used for the Serpentine work were natural rocks deposited by glacial action in North Wales. They weighed almost 30 tons each so their exact shape was mapped using lidar and then 3D models were constructed to determine a position in which they would balance without aid. This work was led by Alice Blair of the Arup engineering consultancy. The installation in London is temporary, as it was planned to be moved to its permanent site in Doha after a year. The exhibition in London was extended until September 2014 and complemented the new Serpentine Pavilion of Smiljan Radić Clarke, which also features large boulders.

== Reception ==
Radic's summer pavilion. Rock on Top of Another Rock is off the picture to the left.

Radic liked the work and commented, "A Fischli and Weiss rock is different from a Smiljan Radic rock. We are thinking about the same objects in a different way. How we put it in a space is really different. [Although] in the end, it's a rock".

Director Hans-Ulrich Obrist has been enthusiastic about Fischli and Weiss' work since seeing their photographic exhibition, Equilibres/Quiet Afternoon, which was created in 1984 and is still on display at the gallery. He sees their new work as a meeting point, "We can meet each other beneath the rocks and talk about a rock on top of another rock."

Author John Costella praised the "sheer dynamics of its size and balance. The Swiss artists ... are to be applauded for their amazing sculpture."

== See also ==
- Mabley Green Boulder
- Rock balancing
