= Wood Line =

Public sculpture in California

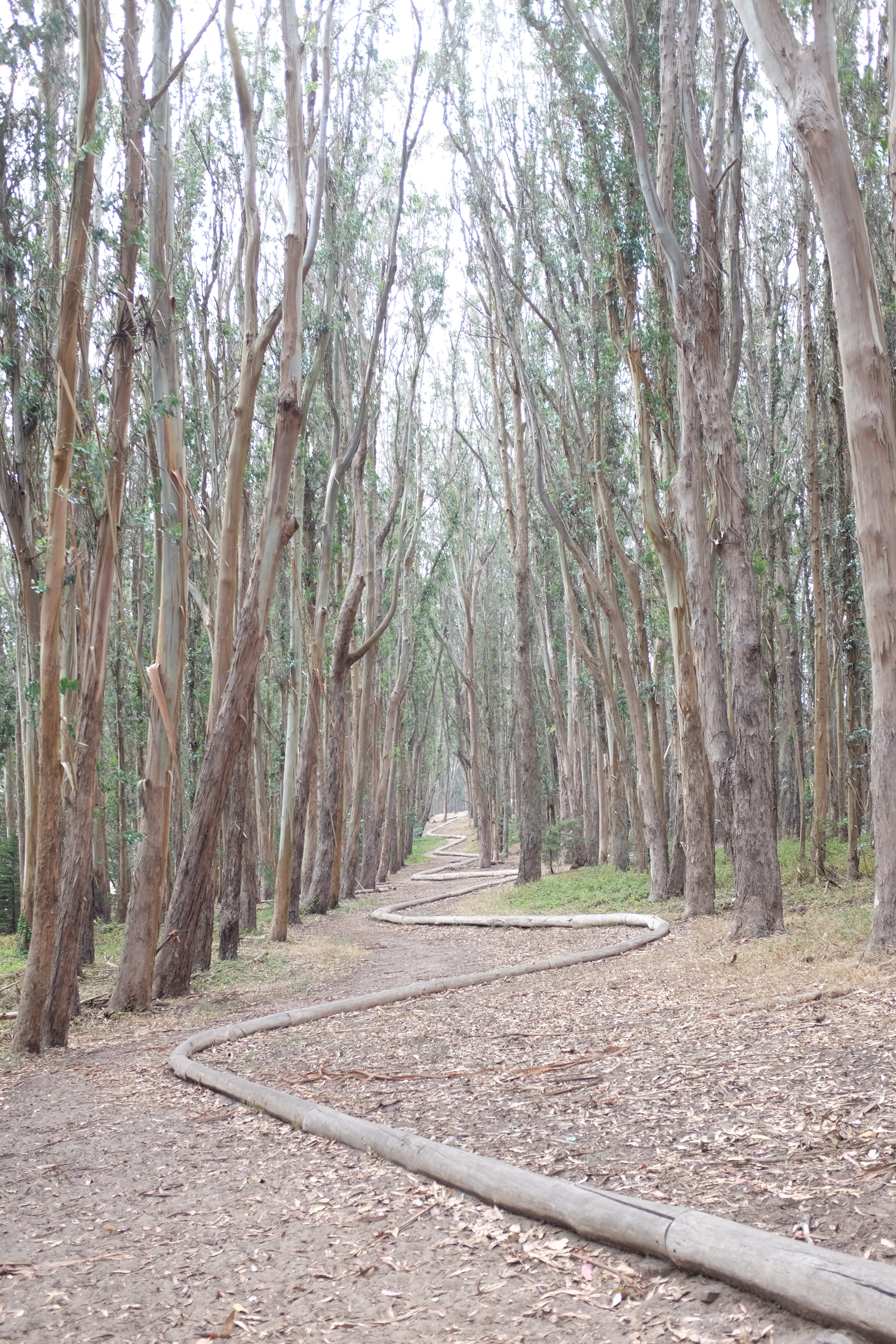
- The sculpture in 2014
- Artist: Andy Goldsworthy
- Year: 2010-2011
- Medium: Eucalyptus braches
- Dimensions: 1,200 ft (370 m) long
- 37.7931°N 122.4485°W
- Owner: City of San Francisco

Wood Line is a public sculpture in the Presidio of San Francisco in San Francisco, California. Made by Andy Goldsworthy, it is one of the most photographed areas of the park.

== History ==
When the trees in the park were planted in the 1880s, cypress and Eucalyptus were planted alternately. The cypresses died, leaving a gap between the eucalypts. The sculpture was commissioned to fill the gap. Goldsworthy started the sculpture in 2010 and completed it in 2011.

== Description ==
The 1,200 ft (370 m)-long sculpture is made out of Eucalyptus branches. Its message is that "transformation is inevitable", as the line will one day deteriorate and return to the ground, where it originally came from. Wood Line contrasts with Spire, another Goldsworthy work that towers 100 ft (30 m) tall.
