= Andy Goldsworthy =

British sculptor and environmentalist

Andy Goldsworthy OBE
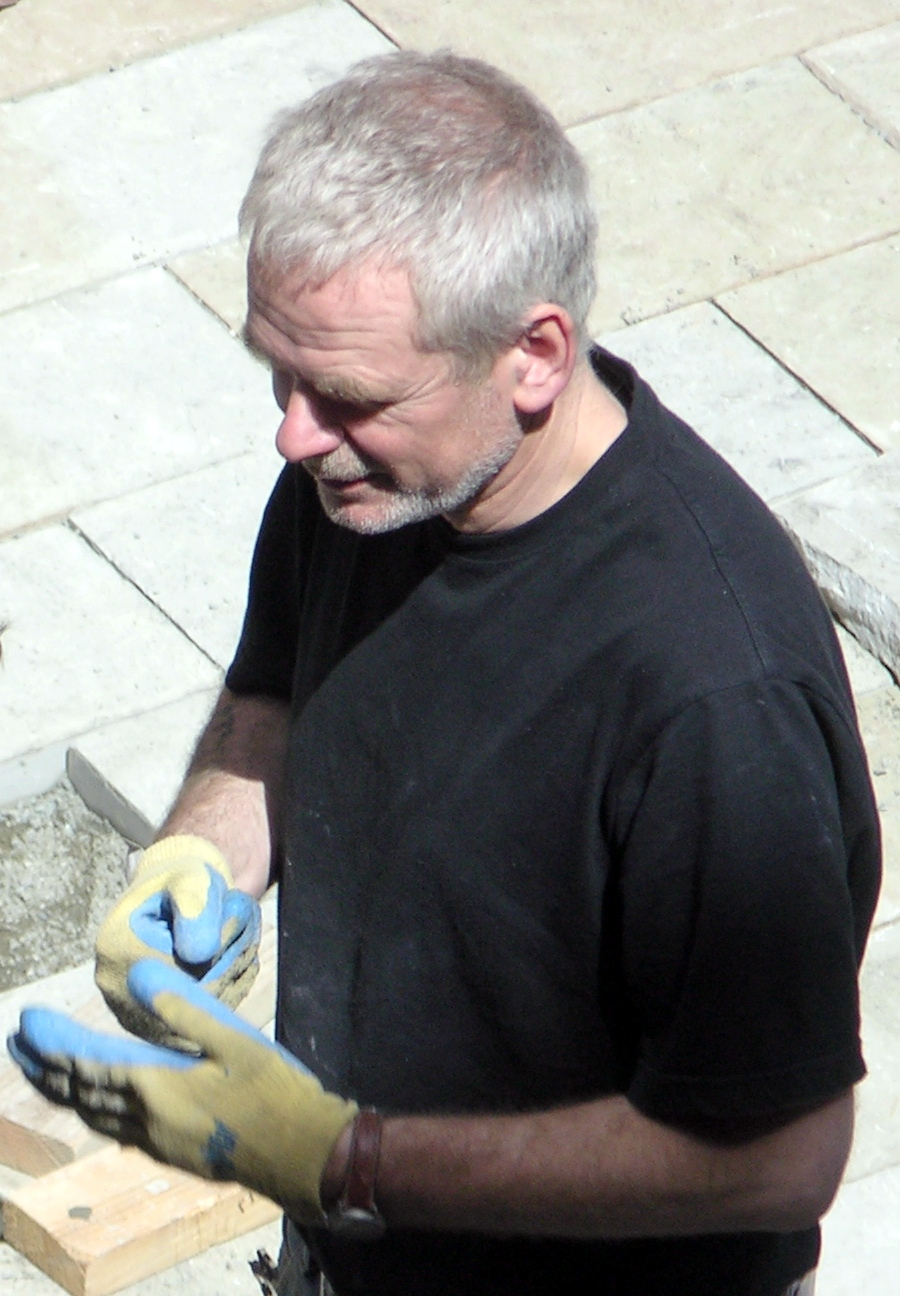
- Goldsworthy in 2005
- Born: 25 July 1956 (age 70); Cheshire, England
- Known for: Sculpture, photography
- Movement: Environmental art, land art
- Spouse: Judith Gregson (divorced)
- Partner: Tina Fiske
- Children: 4

Andy Goldsworthy OBE (born 25 July 1956) is an English sculptor, photographer, and environmentalist who produces site-specific sculptures and land art situated in natural or urban settings.

== Early life ==
Goldsworthy was born in Cheshire on 25 July 1956, the son of Muriel (née Stanger) and Frederick Allin Goldsworthy (1929–2001), a former professor of applied mathematics at the University of Leeds. He grew up on the Harrogate side of Leeds. From the age of 13, he worked on farms as a labourer. He has likened the repetitive quality of farm tasks to the routine of making sculpture: "A lot of my work is like picking potatoes; you have to get into the rhythm of it."

He attended Harrogate Secondary Modern and Harrogate High schools. From 1974–75, he studied fine art at Bradford College of Art, then from 1975–1978 at Preston Polytechnic, now the University of Central Lancashire, where he received his BA.

== Career ==
=== History ===
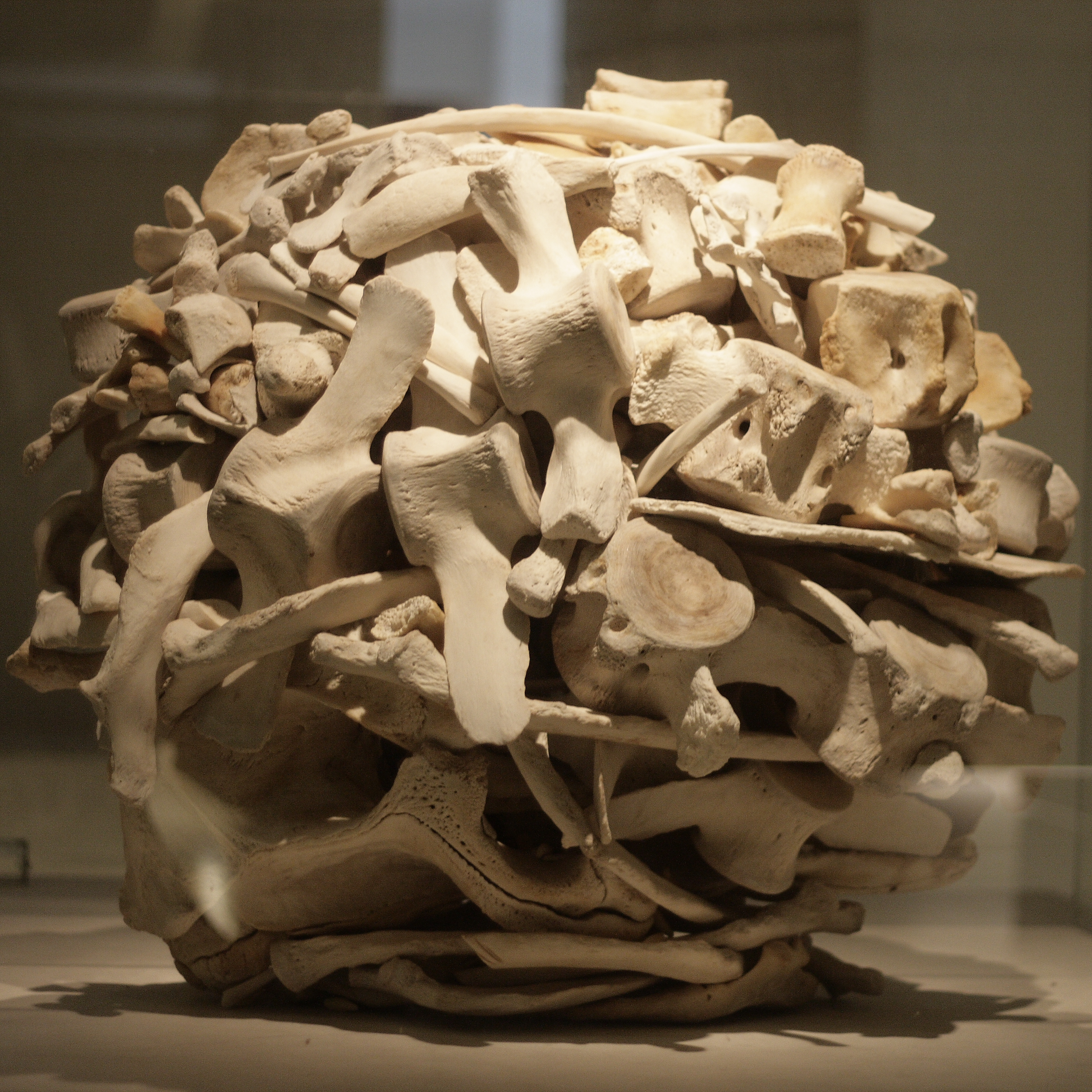
Sculpture by Goldsworthy in the National Museum of Scotland

After leaving college, Goldsworthy lived in Yorkshire, Lancashire, and Cumbria. He moved to Scotland in 1985, first living in Langholm and then settling a year later in Penpont, where he still resides. It has been said that his gradual drift northwards was "due to a way of life over which he did not have complete control", but that contributing factors were opportunities and desires to work in these areas and "reasons of economy".

In 1993, Goldsworthy received an honorary degree from the University of Bradford. He was an A.D. White Professor-At-Large in Sculpture at Cornell University 2000–2006 and 2006–2008.

In 2003, Goldsworthy produced a commissioned work for the entry courtyard of San Francisco's de Young Museum called "Drawn Stone", which echoes San Francisco's frequent earthquakes and their effects. His installation included a giant crack in the pavement that broke off into smaller cracks, and broken limestone, which could be used for benches. The smaller cracks were made with a hammer, adding unpredictability to the work as he created it.

In 2025, Goldsworthy held a major show in the Royal Scottish Academy in Edinburgh to mark 50 years of him being an artist. When approached by the National Galleries of Scotland about doing a show, they expected Goldsworthy to focus on one of their outdoor spaces, instead he asked to have the use of the prominent city-centre gallery. The show featured a range of installations and photographs in the upper level of the gallery, plus a selection of earlier works including sketchbooks and videos in the lower levels.

=== Art process ===
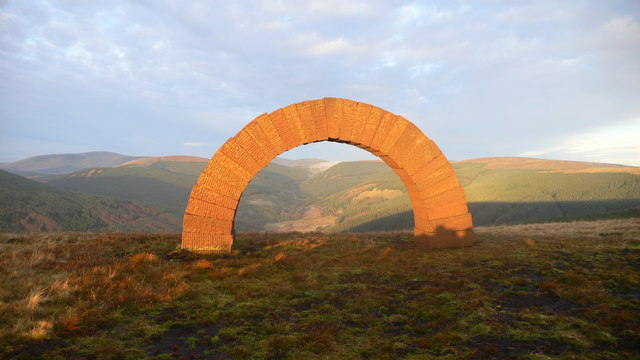
Bail Hill Striding Arch, one of four arches built by Goldsworthy in this area of Scotland

The materials used in Goldsworthy's art often include brightly coloured flowers, icicles, leaves, mud, pinecones, snow, stone, twigs, and thorns. He has been quoted as saying, "I think it's incredibly brave to be working with flowers and leaves and petals. But I have to: I can't edit the materials I work with. My remit is to work with nature as a whole."

Rather than interfering in natural processes, his work magnifies existing ones through deliberately minimal intervention in the landscape. Goldsworthy has said "I am reluctant to carve into or break off solid living rock...I feel a difference between large, deep rooted stones and the debris lying at the foot of a cliff, pebbles on a beach...These are loose and unsettled, as if on a journey, and I can work with them in ways I couldn't with a long resting stone." Goldsworthy's commitment to working with available natural materials injects an inherent scarcity and contingency into the work.

In contrast to other artists who work with the land, most of Goldsworthy's works are small in scale and temporary in their installation. For these ephemeral works, Goldsworthy often uses only his bare hands, teeth, and found tools to prepare and arrange the materials. His process reveals a preoccupation with temporality and a specific attention to materials which visibly age and decay, a view which stands in contrast to monumentalism in Land Art.

For his permanent sculptures like "Roof", "Stone River" and "Three Cairns", "Moonlit Path" (Petworth, West Sussex, 2002) and "Chalk Stones" in the South Downs, near West Dean, West Sussex he has employed the use of machine tools. To create "Roof", Goldsworthy worked with his assistant and five British dry-stone wallers, who were used to make sure the structure could withstand time and nature.

Goldsworthy is generally considered the founder of modern rock balancing.

=== Photography ===
Photography plays a crucial role in his art due to its often ephemeral and transient state. Photographs (made primarily by Goldsworthy himself) of site-specific, environmental works allow them to be shared without severing important ties to place. According to Goldsworthy, "Each work grows, stays, decays – integral parts of a cycle which the photograph shows at its heights, marking the moment when the work is most alive. There is an intensity about a work at its peak that I hope is expressed in the image. Process and decay are implicit."

Photography aids Goldsworthy in understanding his works, as much as in communicating them to an audience. He has said, "Photography is my way of talking, writing and thinking about my art. It makes me aware of connections and developments that might have not otherwise have been apparent. It is the visual evidence which runs through my art as a whole and gives me a broader, more distant view of what I am doing."

=== Documentary films on Goldsworthy ===
Goldsworthy is the subject of a 2001 documentary feature film called Rivers and Tides, directed by German director Thomas Riedelsheimer. In 2018, Riedelsheimer released a second documentary on Goldsworthy titled Leaning Into the Wind.

== Personal life ==
In 1982, Goldsworthy married Judith Gregson; they had four children together before separating. Judith later died in 2008. He lives in the Scottish village of Penpont with his partner, Tina Fiske, an art historian.

== Awards ==
- 1979 – North West Arts Award
- 1980 – Yorkshire Arts Award
- 1981 – Northern Arts Award
- 1982 – Northern Arts Award
- 1986 – Northern Arts Bursary
- 1987 – Scottish Arts Council Award
- 1989 – Northern Electricity Arts Award
- 2000 – Appointed officer of the Order of the British Empire (OBE)
- 2026 – Praemium Imperiale in the category Sculpture

== Exhibitions and installations ==
Image	Dates	Title	Location
	1995–2008	Sapsucker Cairn	Ithaca, New York, USA
	1996–2003	Sheepfolds	Cumbria, England, UK
	1997	Stone House	Herring Island, Victoria, Australia
	1997	Cairn	Herring Island, Victoria, Australia
	1998	Hutton Roof	National Museum of Scotland Edinburgh, Scotland, UK
	22 May – 15 November 2000	Andy Goldsworthy at Storm King Art Center (featuring the installation Storm King Wall)	Storm King Art Center Mountainville, Cornwall, New York, USA
	August 2001	Stone River	Cantor Arts Center, Stanford University Stanford, California, USA
	2002	Andy Goldsworthy Arch at Goodwood	Cass Sculpture Foundation Goodwood, West Sussex, England, UK
	2002	Chalk Stones Trail	South Downs near West Dean, West Sussex
	2002	Three Cairns	Des Moines Art Center Des Moines, IA USA
	4 May – 31 October 2004	Andy Goldsworthy on the Roof (featuring the installation Stone Houses)	Iris and B. Gerald Cantor Metropolitan Museum of Art Roof Garden New York City, USA
	2005	Andy Goldsworthy: Early Works A national touring exhibition from the Haywood Gallery	England, United Kingdom
	2005	Drawn Stone	M. H. de Young Memorial Museum San Francisco
	2005	Arches	Gibbs Farm; New Zealand
	22 January – 15 May 2005	The Andy Goldsworthy Project (including the installation Roof)	National Gallery of Art National Mall, Washington, D.C., USA
	2006	Red sandstone wall at the Doerr-Hosier Center	Aspen Institute Aspen, Colorado, USA
	31 March 2007 – 6 January 2008	Hanging Trees	Yorkshire Sculpture Park West Bretton, Wakefield, West Yorkshire, England, UK
	2007 – 2008	Clay Houses (Boulder-Room-Holes)	Glenstone Potomac, Maryland, USA
	October 2008	Spire	Park Presidio; San Francisco
	June 2009	Refuge d'Art Hiking Trail, Provence, France	Provence; France
	2010-11	Wood Line	Park Presidio; San Francisco
	7 September 2012 – 2 November 2012	Domo de Argila / Clay Dome	Cais do Porto Rio de Janeiro, Brazil
	2013	Tree Fall	Park Presidio; San Francisco
	2014	Earth Wall	Park Presidio; San Francisco
	2019	Walking Wall	Nelson-Atkins Museum of Art; Missouri
	26 July – 2 November 2025	Andy Goldsworthy Fifty Years	Royal Scottish Academy Edinburgh, Scotland, UK
	TBD	Gravestones	Dalveen, Dumfries and Galloway, Scotland, UK

== Publications ==
- Andy Goldsworthy (1985). Rain, Sun, Snow, Hail, Mist, Calm: Photoworks by Andy Goldsworthy. Leeds: Henry Moore Centre for the Study of Sculpture. ISBN 0-901981-24-9.
- Andy Goldsworthy (1988). Parkland. [Yorkshire]: Yorkshire Sculpture Park. ISBN 1-871480-00-0.
- Andy Goldsworthy (1989). Touching North. London: Fabian Carlsson. ISBN 0-948274-06-9.
- Andy Goldsworthy (1989). Leaves. London: Common Ground. ISBN 1-870364-07-4.
- Andy Goldsworth (1990). Andy Goldsworthy. London: Viking. ISBN 0-670-83213-8. Republished as Andy Goldsworthy (1990). Andy Goldsworthy : A Collaboration with Nature. New York, N.Y.: H. N. Abrams. ISBN 0-8109-3351-9.
- Andy Goldsworthy (1992). Ice and Snow Drawings : 1990–1992. Edinburgh: FruitMarket Gallery. ISBN 0-947912-06-1.
- Goldsworthy, Andy; Friedman, Terry (1993). Hand to Earth : Andy Goldsworthy Sculpture, 1976–1990. New York, N.Y.: H. N. Abrams. ISBN 0-8109-3420-5.
- Andy Goldsworthy (1994). Stone. London: Viking. ISBN 0-670-85478-6.
- Goldsworthy, Andy; Chettle, Steve; Nesbitt, Paul; Humphries, Andrew (1996). Sheepfolds. London: Michael Hue-Williams Fine Art Ltd.
- Andy Goldsworthy (1996). Wood. Introduction by Terry Friedman. London: Viking. ISBN 0-670-87137-0.
- Goldsworthy, Andy; Craig, David (1999). Arch. London: Thames & Hudson. ISBN 0-500-01933-9.
- Andy Goldsworthy. Chronology by Terry Friedman (2000). Time. London: Thames & Hudson. ISBN 0-500-51026-1.
- Goldsworthy, Andy; Thompson, Jerry L.; Storm King Art Center (2000). Wall at Storm King. London: Thames & Hudson. ISBN 0-500-01991-6.
- Andy Goldsworthy. Introduction by Judith Collins (2001). Midsummer Snowballs. London: Thames & Hudson. ISBN 0-500-51065-2.
- Andy Goldsworthy (2002). Andy Goldsworthy : Refuges D'Art. Lyon; Digne, France: Editions Artha; Musée départemental de Digne. ISBN 2-84845-001-0.
- Andy Goldsworthy (2004). Passage. London: Thames & Hudson. ISBN 0-500-51191-8.
- Andy Goldsworthy (2007). Enclosure. London: Thames & Hudson. ISBN 978-0-500-09336-8.
- Goldsworthy, Andy (2015). Andy Goldsworthy: Ephemeral Works: 2004–2014. New York: Harry N. Abrams. ISBN 978-1419717796.

== See also ==
- Environmental art
- Environmental sculpture
- Greenmuseum.org
- Land art
- Rock balancing

== Further information ==
Articles:

- Mead, Rebecca. "A Landscape Artist in Winter". The New Yorker profile, February 9, 2026
- Beyst, Stefan (June 2002). "Andy Goldsworthy: The beauty of creation". Archived from the original on 25 June 2007.
- Moore, Robbie. "Goldsworthy in stone". Specifier Magazine. Archived from the original on 6 September 2007.
- SPARK Educator Guide. Andy Goldsworthy at the de Young Museum in San Francisco. (Visual Arts: earthworks). (2005).

Books:

- Malpas, William (1995). Andy Goldsworthy: Touching Nature. Kidderminster: Crescent Moon. ISBN 1-86171-049-6.
- Malpas, William (1998). The Art of Andy Goldsworthy. Kidderminster: Crescent Moon. ISBN 1-86171-032-1.
- Malpas, William (2003). Andy Goldsworthy in Close-Up. Maidstone, Kent: Crescent Moon. ISBN 1-86171-050-X.
- Malpas, William (2008). Andy Goldsworthy: Pocket Guide. Maidstone, Kent: Crescent Moon. ISBN 978-1-86171-241-7.

Film/Documentary

- Rivers and Tides (2001) documentary by Thomas Riedelsheimer
- Leaning into the Wind (2017) documentary by Thomas Riedelsheimer (Leaning into the Wind official Web site)
