= Adrian Gray (artist) =

British artist (born 1961)

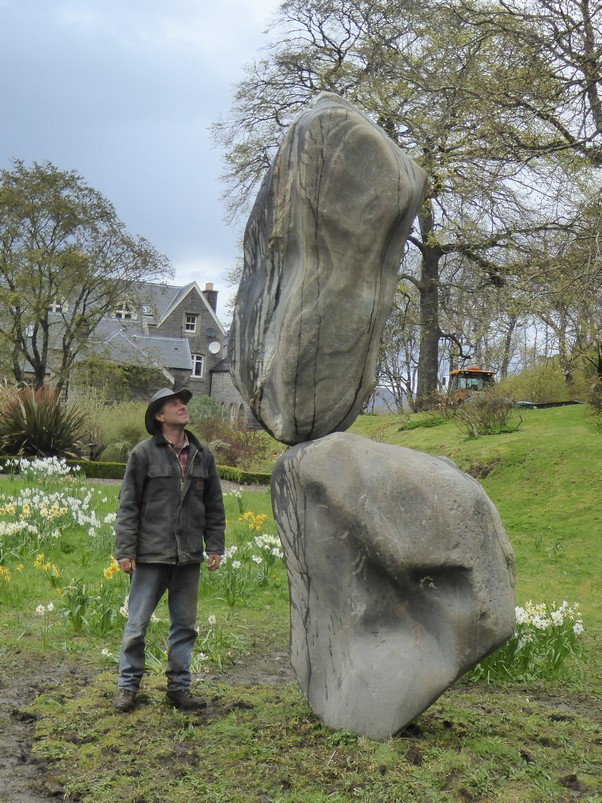
Adrian Gray beside a monumental sculpture

Adrian Gray (born in Bristol in 1961) is a British artist who creates stone balancing sculptures. His career started in 2002.

Gray's work is predominantly sculpture based on balancing natural elements. He creates sculptures using naturally weathered stone, usually on location by the coast.

To show live examples of his work Gray performs demonstrations where he creates new sculptures on site. Gray's sculptures for the garden and indoors are previously balanced compositions fixed permanently in position.

Since 2015 he has also been creating monumental sculptures weighing many tons, balancing them with large cranes. The owners of the sculptures receive a film of their creation.

In 2015 a book about Gray's work was published in the UK. "The Art of Stonebalancing" includes his biography plus photographs by Gray and other photographers.

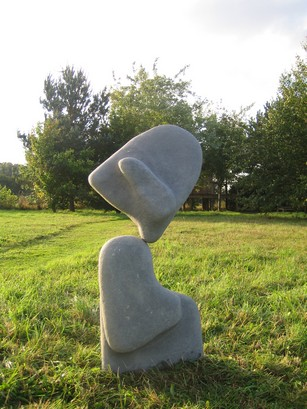

== Exhibitions and events ==
- In collaboration with designer Tony Heywood in December 2024 to mark the anniversary of the Universal declaration of human rights (UDHR) Gray created a sculpture within a greenhouse inscribed with the declarations now sited in central London..
- In 2021 Gray created and installed a 13-ton Norwegian black granite sculpture at RHS Hilltop at RHS Wisley.

*RHS Chelsea Flower Show 2015, 2016, 2017, 2018, 2019, 2021, 2022, 2023 and 2025.[4]

- In 2017 Gray had a solo exhibition at The Roccoco Gardens Painswick.
- In 2015 Gray completed a 14-tonne stonebalancing sculpture, "Trust in Nature". More than five metres tall and made of two Bodmin granite boulders, it was first assembled on Bodmin Moor, where it remained for a week. Gray then moved it to the RHS garden at Rosemoor in Devon for their winter sculpture exhibition and also took the piece to London for the RHS Chelsea Flower Show 2016. The balancing process on Bodmin was filmed for BBC1's The One Show and broadcast on 25 November.
- Gray worked with photographer Mikael Buck to create a series of images for the Isle of Man Tourism Division. The photos show Gray's stone balancing sculptures in natural locations on the island, and were released on 14 July 2015.
- Featured on Channel 4's 'Grand Designs'

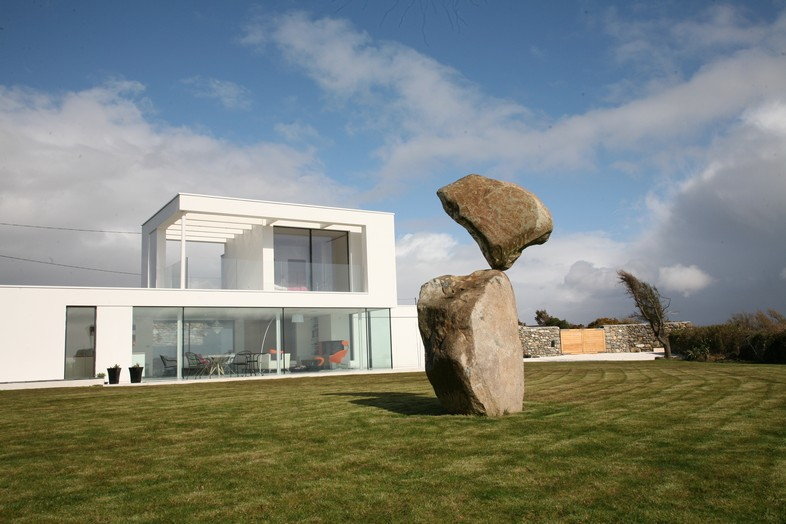
Gray's stonebalancing sculpture created for Channel 4's Grand Designs programme, 2014

- Dorset Arts Week 2010
- Appeared on 'Country Tracks' with Jodie Kidd, BBC1 10 December 2010
- Hartlepool town gallery, solo show September 2012
