= Michael Grab =

Canadian artist

Michael Grab is an artist specializing in rock balancing, photography, and videography. He was born in Edmonton, Alberta, Canada, and currently based in Boulder, Colorado, United States, and has worked professionally since 2008, creating precarious, short-lived works of art, usually in natural and often remote settings.

Grab began practicing his craft in Boulder Creek and he still considers it his home base, though he has given live performances of rock balancing in Switzerland, Sweden, Scotland and Germany and he has balanced rocks in Croatia, Italy, Belgium, and France.

Much of his work is installed in remote natural settings, such as near river or ocean shorelines, and in other natural rocky settings. He has balanced rocks on the shores of Loch Ness. Some work has also been installed in urban settings, such as on street sidewalks. He has installed at least one short-lived underwater rock balance sculpture. Grab often disassembles his work when leaving the site to "close the cycle" and also to adhere to the "leave no trace" principle of trail ethics. Or, he knocks them down, sometimes videographing them as they collapse.

Grab has a degree in sociology which he earned in 2007 from the University of Colorado. Grab considers meditation a part of the practice of successfully balancing rocks. Grab explains that the focus involved in finding points of balance for rocks causes a shutting down of the "excessive mind chatter that usually goes on in people’s heads". His work has been popularized by his own photography of the finished, balanced rocks, which he posts to his website.

Grab is not overly concerned with the impermanence of his work. He considers his work to have "quite a bit of Zen or Buddhist overtones." Beyond the balancing involved, Grab has aesthetic criteria as well. He is critical of some of his own output. He may explain that a piece feels too clumsy. Or he may explain that the "balance points" are too large or the components themselves lack inherent interest. He explains that a recent theme is "to make it look as impossible as possible." The time involved varies considerably from piece to piece, with some formations taking up to five hours to complete.

The work of Michael Grab has been associated with the land art movement although that art movement was most dynamic in the 1960s.
