= Aspen Meadows Resort =

Conference center and resort from Colorado

Coordinates: 39.2012°N 106.8314°W

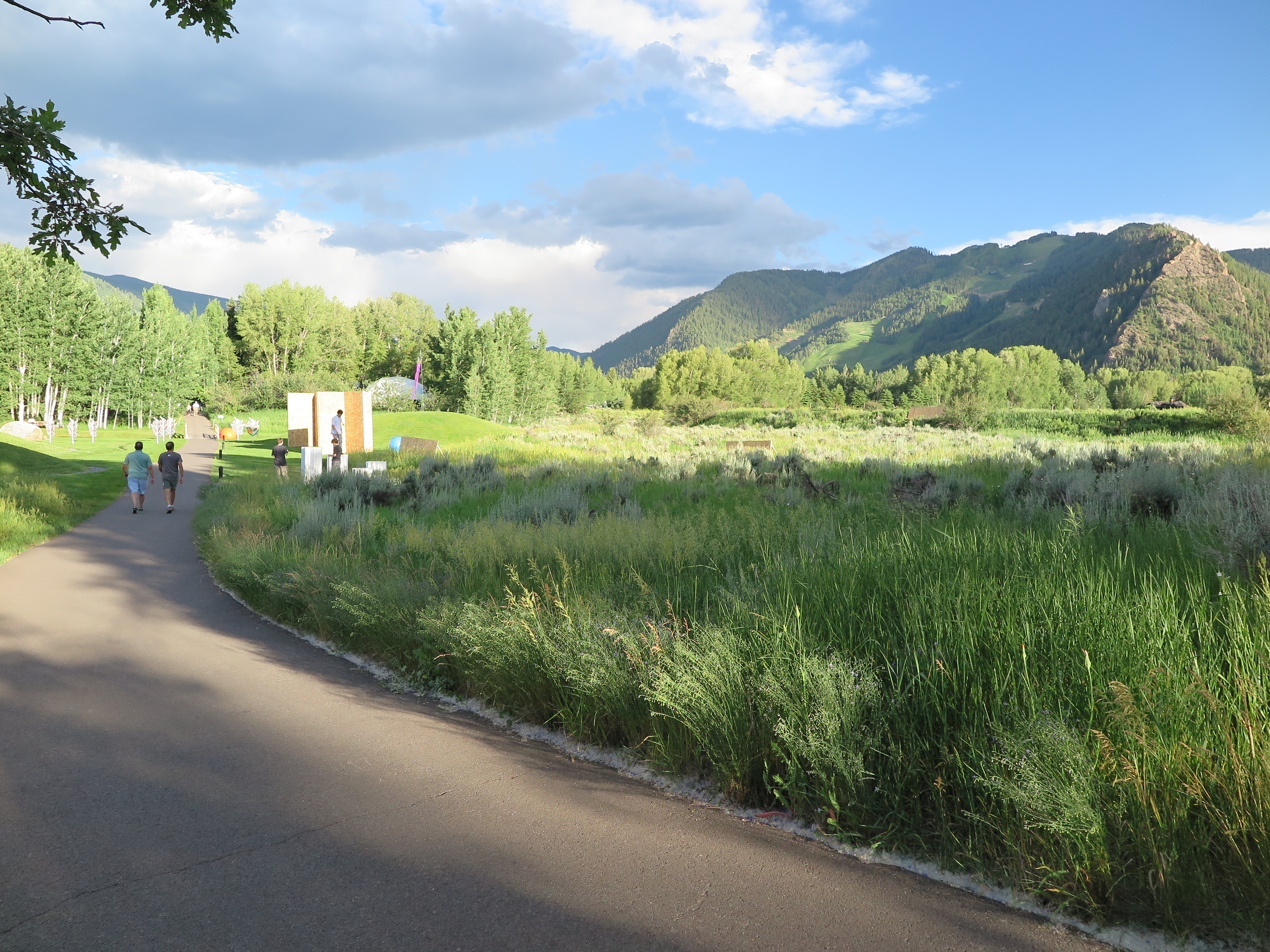
Walking along Anderson Park at the Aspen Meadows campus.

Aspen Meadows is a 40-acre conference center and resort located amongst the Rocky Mountains in Aspen, Colorado. It is owned by the Aspen Institute, and is the venue for some of the institute's events, such as the annual Aspen Ideas Festival and Socrates Program seminars. It was designed by Herbert Bayer in the Bauhaus style.

== History ==
The Goethe Bicentennial Convocation and Music Festival, organized by Walter Paepcke, was held in Aspen in 1949 in an amphitheater tent designed by Eero Saarinen. The success of the gathering led to the creation of the Aspen Institute. Programming was initially held in rotating locations, but by 1952 the institute's Executive Seminar needed a dedicated, purpose-built space and Paepcke purchased land for the institute from the Aspen Company (another Paepcke organization. The first permanent building, the Executive Seminar building, was built in 1953.

== Buildings ==
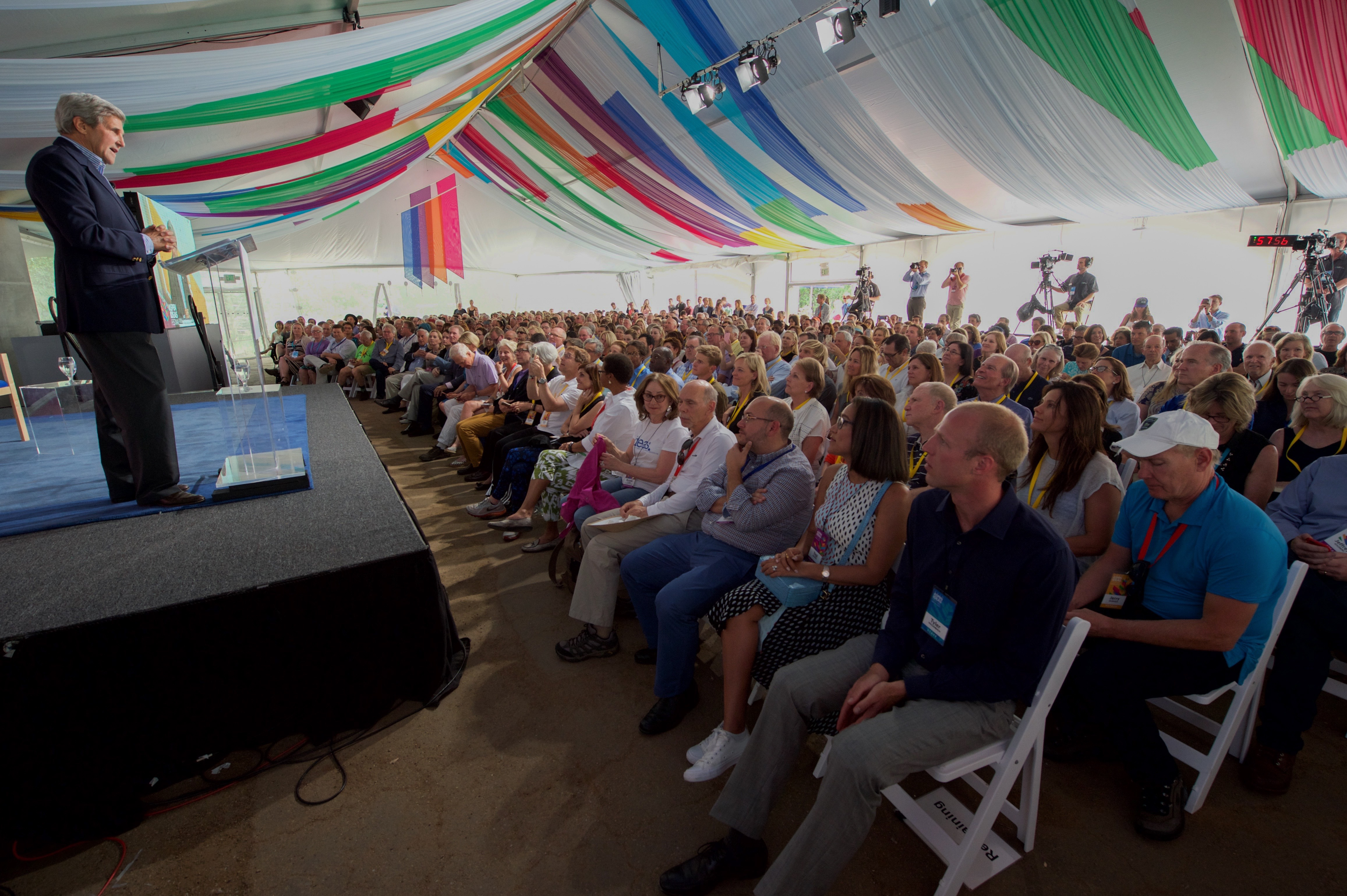
Secretary John Kerry addresses attendees in the Greenwald Pavilion at the Aspen Ideas Festival.

Among the buildings on site are:

=== Koch Seminar Building ===
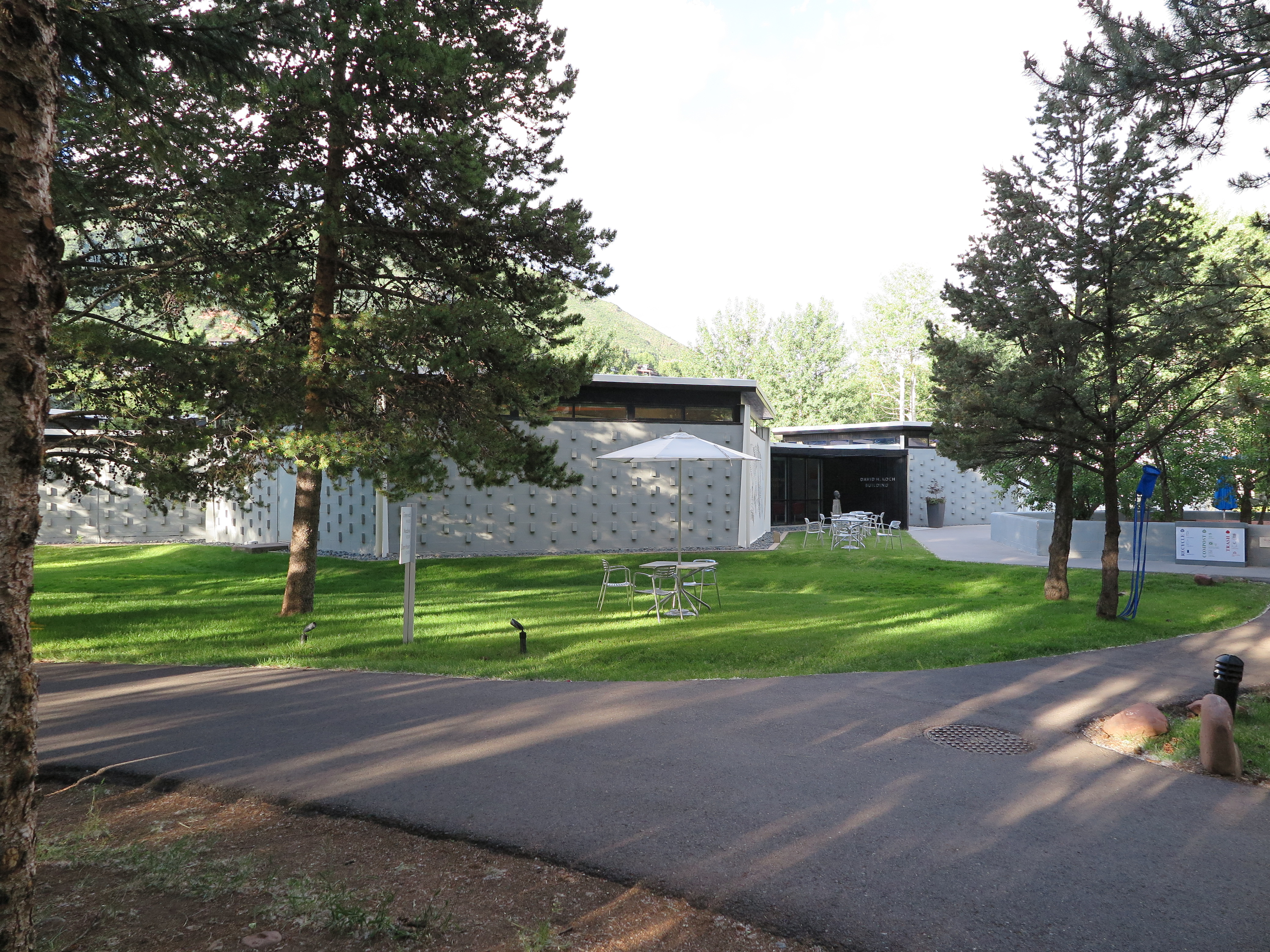
David H. Koch Seminar Building

When the Executive Seminar first began it didn't have a permanent space to use therefore its location varied from day to day. By 1952, Walter Paepcke decided a permanent, purpose-built space was needed. Mortimer J. Adler was consulted as to the needs for the building and Herbert Bayer, with Fritz Benedict designing and supervising the construction of the Executive Seminar Building. It was built at a cost of $52,000 (1953 dollars) and became the first permanent Institute building. The building consists of two large hexagonal shaped seminar rooms and several smaller offices.

=== Doerr-Hosier Center ===
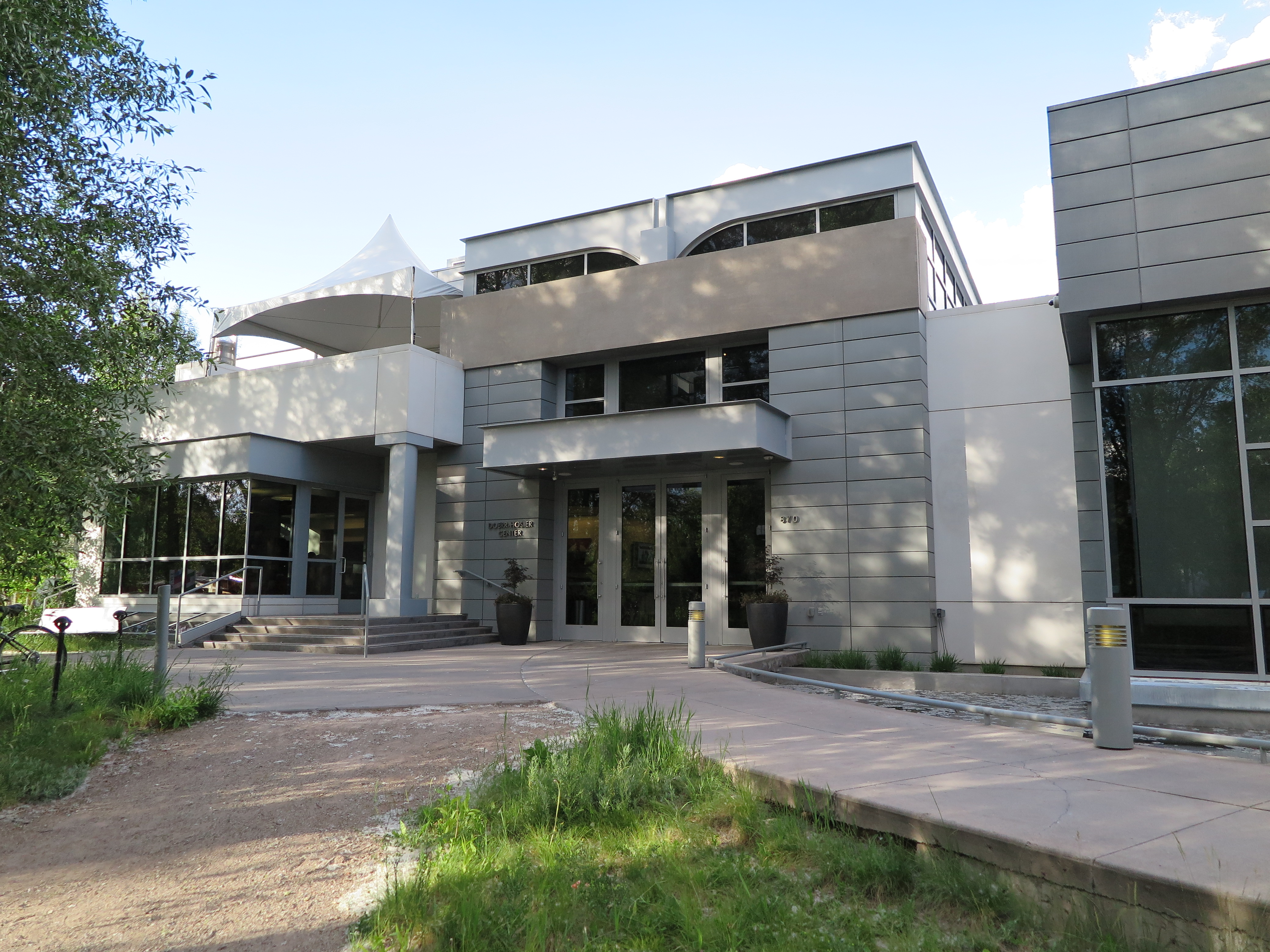
Front of the Doerr-Hosier Center

Named after donors Gerald D. Hosier and John Doerr, the 22,000 square foot Doerr-Hosier Center was designed by architect Jeff Berkus and built for $12.5m. It opened on June 8, 2007, and is LEED Gold certified. The building features a red sandstone wall designed by British sculptor Andy Goldsworthy made of rocks from China, Jordan, India, and Colorado. The sandstone "river" begins outside the building's entrance, moves through a reflecting pool, flows through the McNulty Gathering Room, and emerges out the other side to follow the Roaring Fork River.

== See also ==
- Aspen Music Festival and School
- Aspen Center for Physics
