= Site-specific art =

Artwork created for a certain place

Dan Flavin, Untitled, 1996, Menil Collection, Houston, Texas, US

Site-specific art is artwork created to exist in a certain place. Typically, the artist takes the location into account while planning and creating the artwork. Site-specific art is produced both by commercial artists and independently, and can include some instances of work such as sculpture, stencil graffiti, rock balancing, and other art forms. Installations can be in urban areas, remote natural settings, or underwater.

== History ==
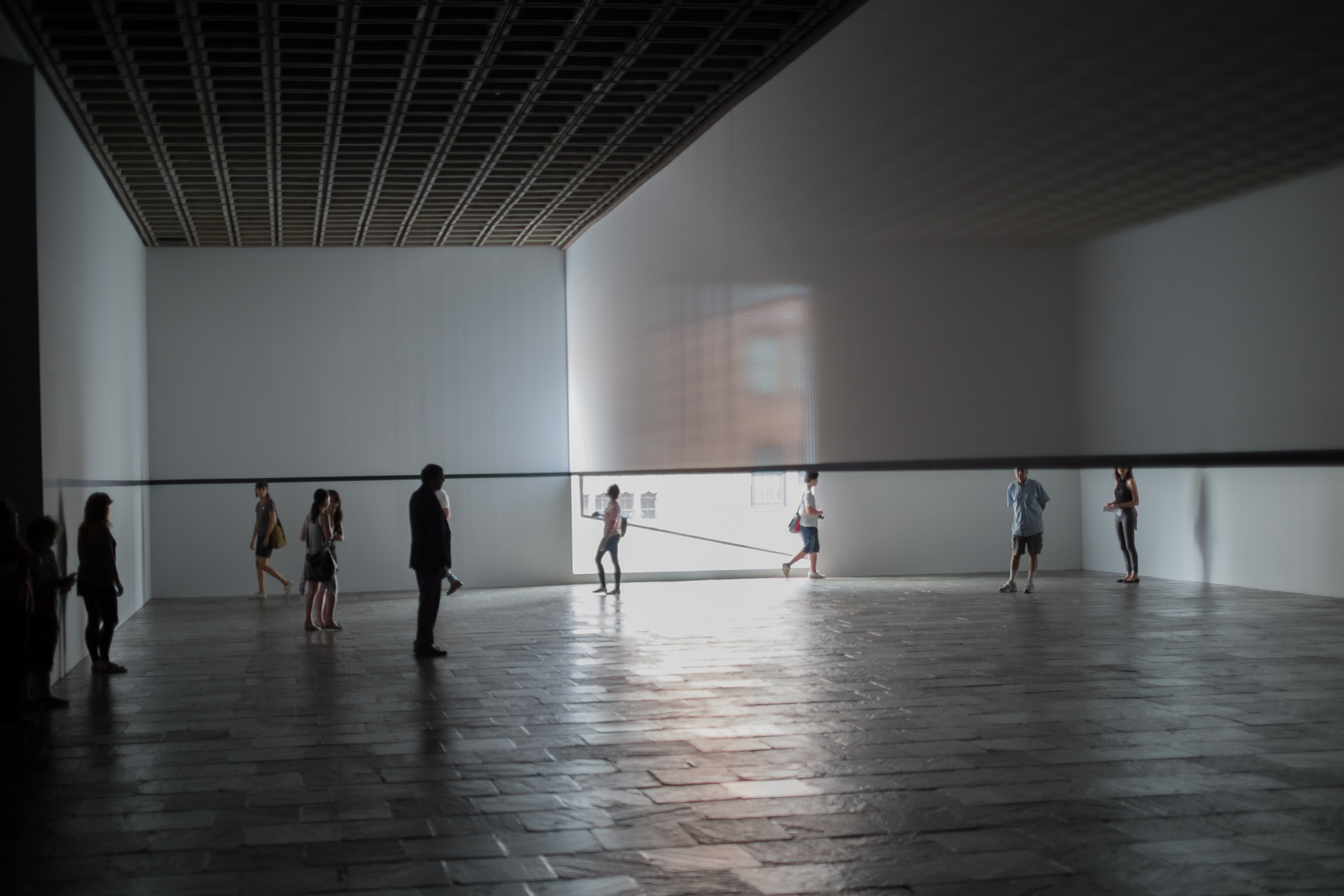
Robert Irwin, Scrim Veil Black Rectangle Natural Light, Whitney Museum 2013

The term "site-specific art" was promoted and refined by Californian artist Robert Irwin but it was actually first used in the mid-1970s by young sculptors, such as Patricia Johanson, Dennis Oppenheim, and Athena Tacha, who had started executing public commissions for large urban sites. For Two Jumps for Dead Dog Creek (1970), Oppenheim attempted a series of standing jumps at a selected site in Idaho, where "the width of the creek became a specific goal to which I geared a bodily activity," with his two successful jumps being "dictated by a land form." Site-specific environmental art was first described as a movement by architectural critic Catherine Howett and art critic Lucy Lippard. Emerging out of minimalism, site-specific art opposed the Modernist program of subtracting from the artwork all cues that interfere with the fact that it is "art",

Modernist art objects were transportable, nomadic, could only exist in the museum space and were the objects of the market and commodification. Since 1960, artists were trying to find a way out of this situation, and thus drew attention to the site and the context around this site. The work of art was created at the site and could only exist under such circumstances - it cannot be moved or changed. The notion of "site" precisely references the current location, which comprises a unique combination of physical elements: depth, length, weight, height, shape, walls, temperature.

Works of art began to emerge from the walls of the museum and galleries (Daniel Buren, Within and Beyond the Frame, John Weber Gallery, New York, 1973), were created specifically for the museum and galleries (Michael Asher, untitled installation at Claire Copley Gallery, Los Angeles, 1974; Hans Haacke, Condensation Cube, 1963–65; Mierle Laderman Ukeles, Washing/Tracks/Maintenance: Outside, Wadsworth Atheneum, Hartford, 1973), thus criticizing the museum as an institution that sets the rules for artists and viewers.

Jean-Max Albert, created Sculptures Bachelard in Parc de la Villette, related to the site, or Carlotta’s Smile, a trellis construction related to Ar. Co.'s architecture Lisbon, and a choreography in collaboration with Michala Marcus and Carlos Zingaro, 1979.

When the public debate over Tilted Arc (1981) resulted in its removal in 1989, its author Richard Serra reacted with what can be considered a definition of site-specific art: "To move the work is to destroy the work."

== Examples ==
Outdoor site-specific artworks often include landscaping combined with permanently sited sculptural elements; it is sometimes linked with environmental art. Outdoor site-specific artworks can also include dance performances created especially for the site. More broadly, the term is sometimes used for any work that is more or less permanently attached to a particular location. In this sense, a building with interesting architecture could also be considered a piece of site-specific art.

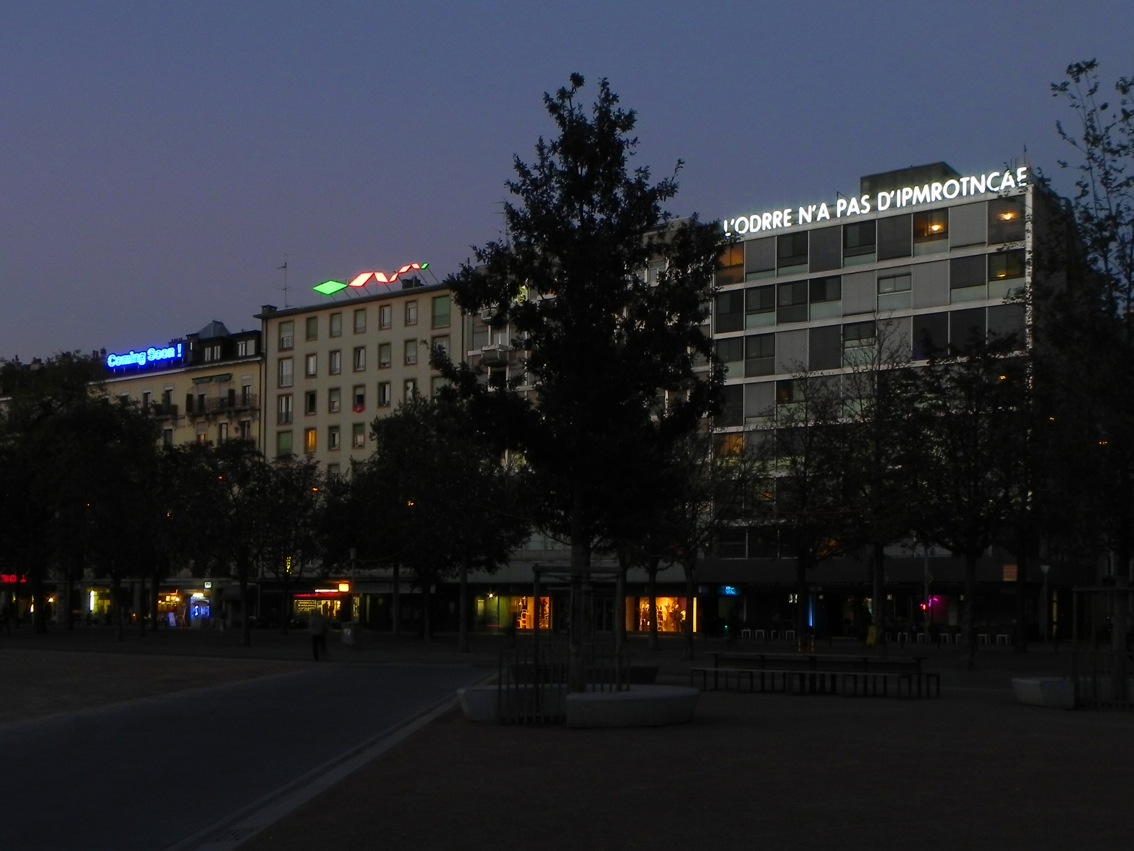
The Neon Parallax: luminous artworks specifically designed for the public space

In Geneva, Switzerland, the Contemporary Art Funds have been looking for original ways to integrate art into architecture and the public space since 1980. The Neon Parallax project, initiated in 2004, was conceived specifically for the Plaine de Plainpalais, a public square of 95'000 square meters located in the heart of the city. The project commissioned luminous artistic works for the rooftops of the buildings bordering the plaza, in a similar style to the advertisements installed on the city's glamorous lakefront. As such, the 14 artists invited to contribute to the project were required to respect the same legal size limitations of luminous advertisements in Geneva. The project thus creates a parallax not only between the locations and messages of the artwork and advertisements, but also in the way the viewer interprets the presence of neon signs in the public realm.

Site-specific performance art, site-specific visual art and interventions are commissioned for the annual Infecting the City Festival in Cape Town, South Africa. The site-specific nature of the work allows artists to interrogate the contemporary and historic reality of the Central Business District and create work that allows the city's users to engage and interact with public spaces in new and memorable ways.

== Gallery ==
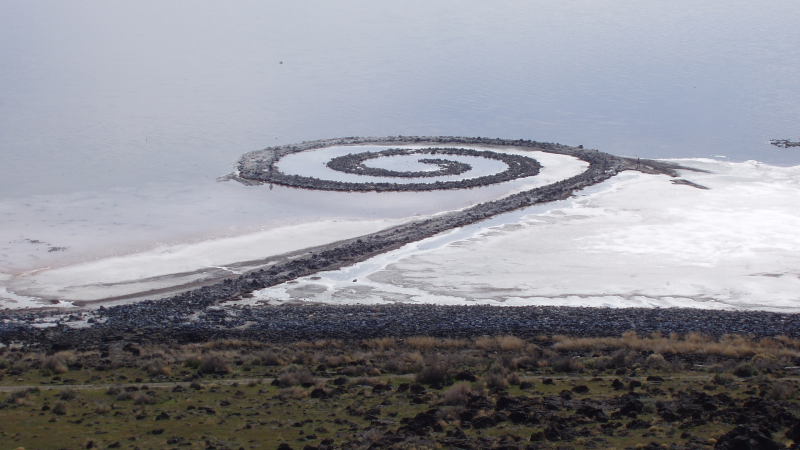
Robert Smithson, Spiral Jetty from atop Rozel Point, 2005.

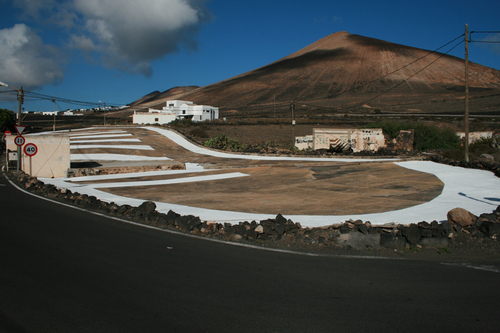
Side effect X, Eberhard Bosslet; Tias, Lanzarote, 2008.

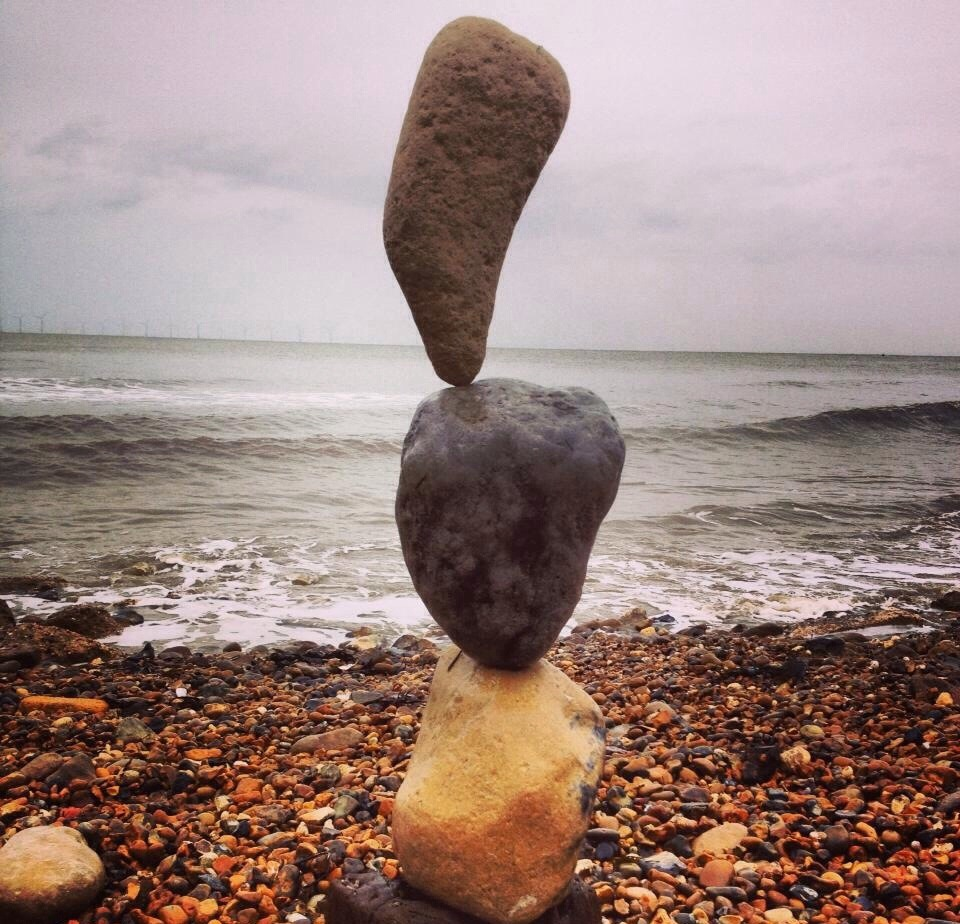
A rock balance, England, 2013.

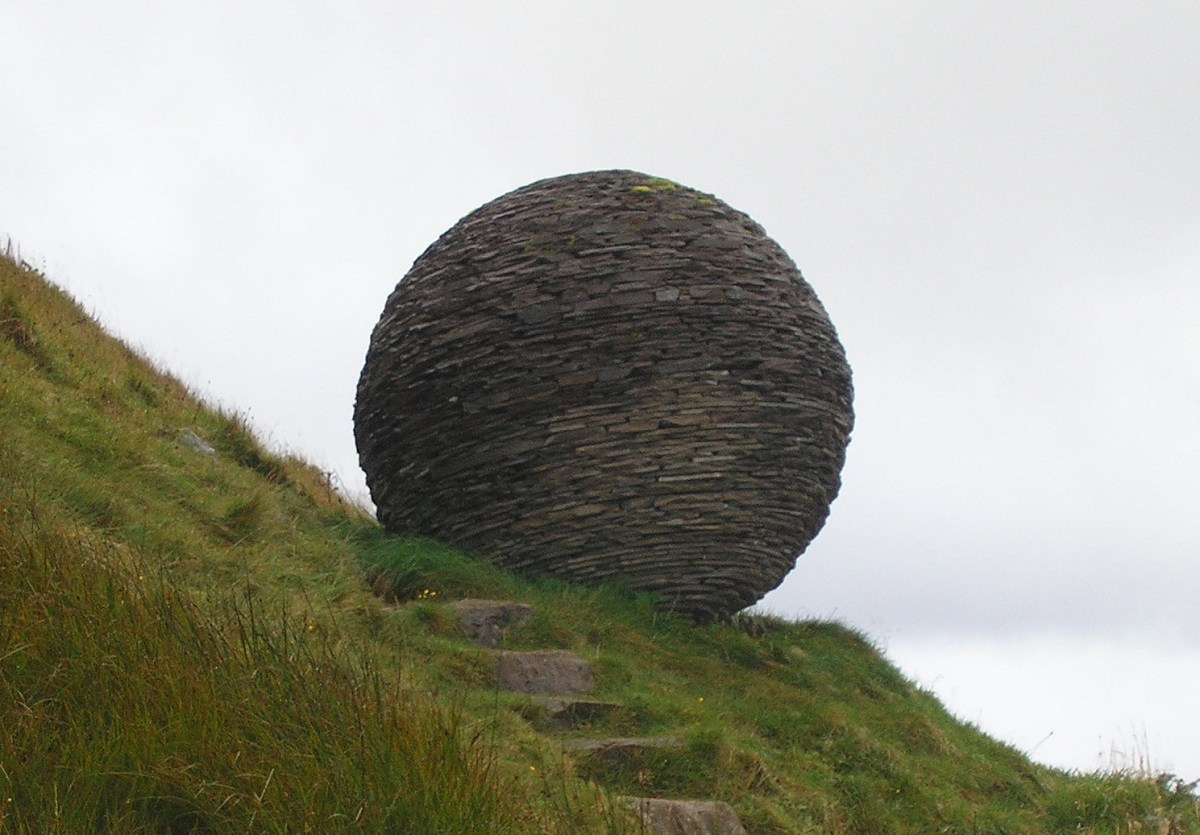
The Globe, Knockan Crag National Nature Reserve, Scotland, 2007.

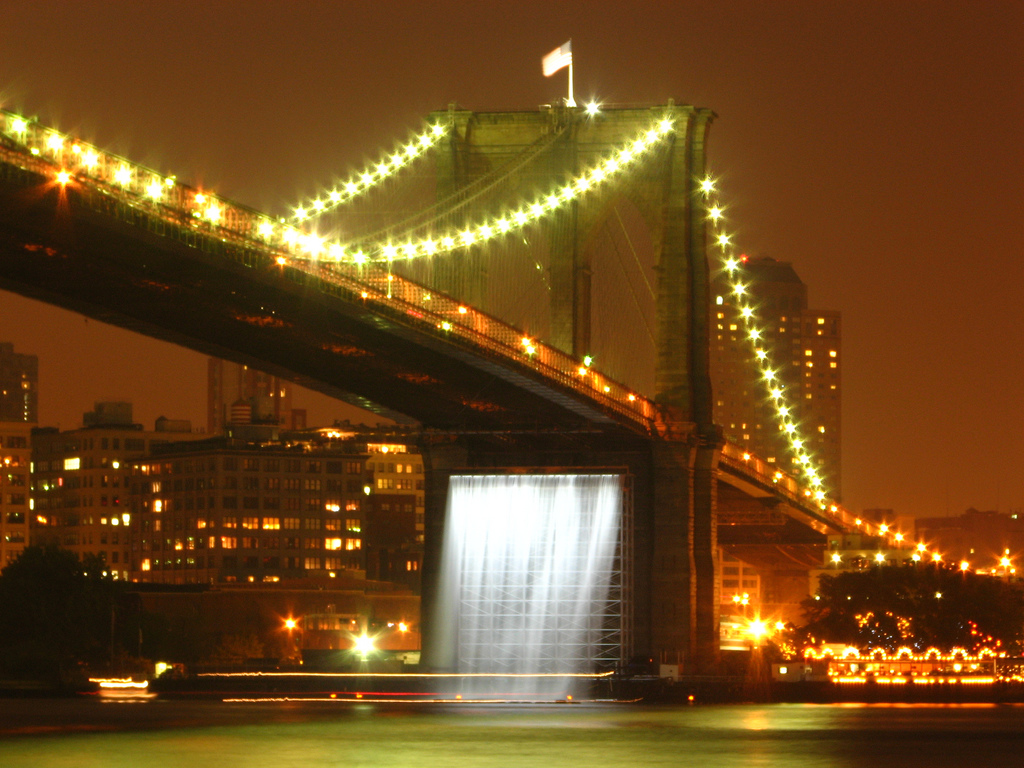
Olafur Eliasson's Waterfalls under the Brooklyn Bridge, 2008.

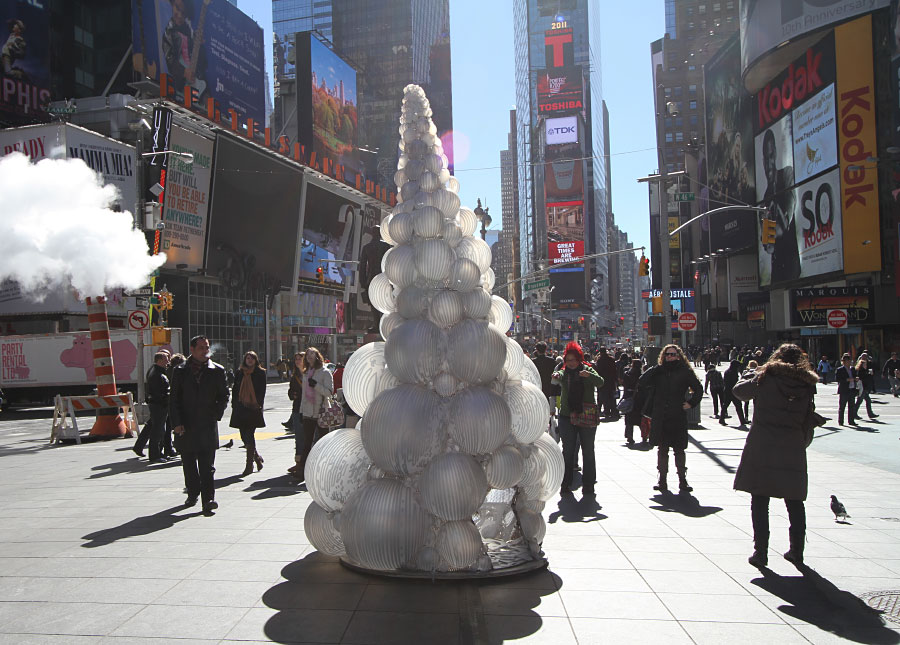
Uros House, Grimanesa Amorós, Times Square, 2011.

== See also ==
- Ecological art
- Environmental art
- Environmental sculpture
- Street art
- Land art
- Rock balancing
- Site-specific theatre
- Street installation
- Public art
