= Rock balancing =

Human-created installation rock art

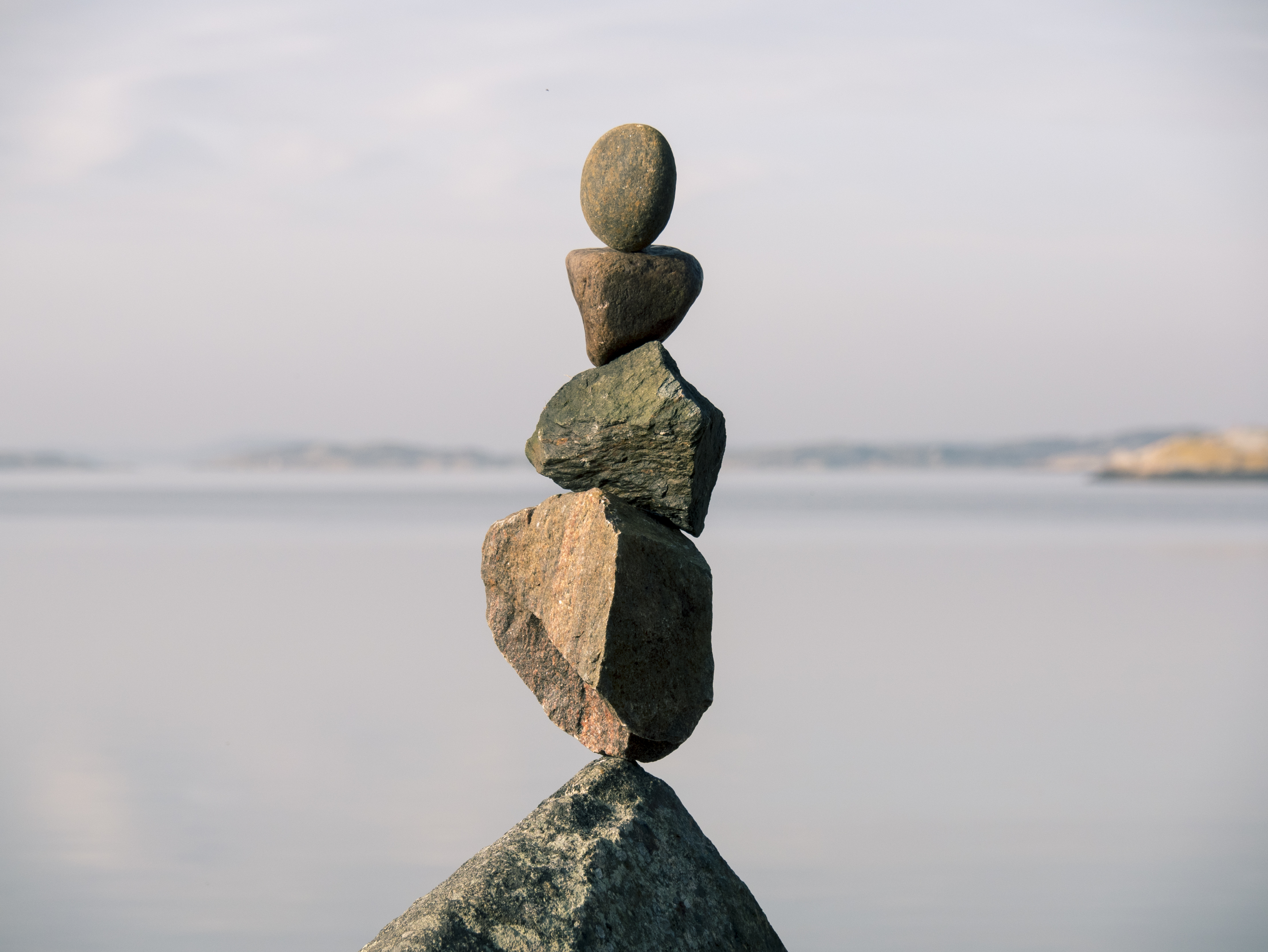
A number of rocks balanced in a precarious manner

Rock balancing (also stone balancing, or stacking) is a form of recreation or artistic expression in which rocks are piled in balanced stacks, often in a precarious manner.

Conservationists and park services have expressed concerns that the arrangements of rocks can disrupt animal habitats, accelerate soil erosion, and misdirect hikers in areas that use cairns as navigation waypoints.

== Process ==
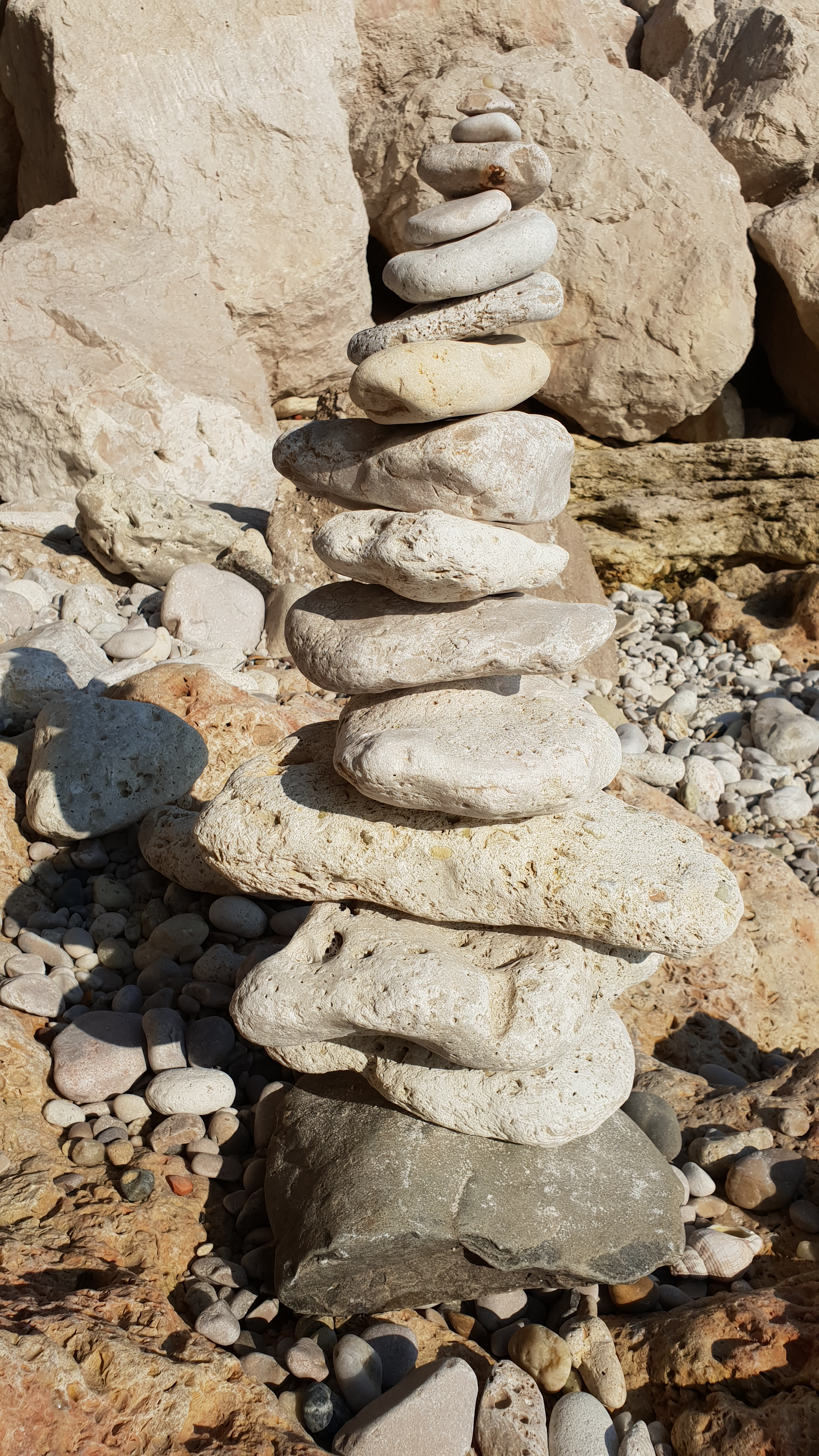
A simple stack of rocks in Sausset-les-Pins, Bouches-du-Rhône, France

During the 2010s, rock balancing became popular around the world, popularised through images of the rocks being shared on social media. Balanced rocks vary from simple stacks of two or three stones, to arrangements of round or sharp stones balancing in precarious and seemingly improbable ways. Professional rock-balancing artist Michael Grab, who can spend hours or minutes on a piece of rock balancing, says that his aim when stacking the stones is "to make it look as impossible as possible", and that the larger the size of the top rock, the more improbable the structure looks. People often assume that Grab has composed his structures using glue or support rods, or photoshopped the final result.

Grab describes the physical process of balancing rocks as "basically looking for points where they lock on one another", saying that three points of contact are required between stones, with the placed rock's center of mass having to be between those points for it to balance. He tests the stability of his finished sculptures by splashing them with water, judging that if they survive that process, they are worthy to be photographed.

Japanese rock balancer Ishihara-Chitoku is interested in rock balancing sculptures in terms of their overall silhouettes. He considers the shapes and colors of the rocks used, and their effect on the sculpture's contours. Chitoku starts his sculptures by selecting a stone to be placed at the top, and building up to it.

Michael Grab has said that in his experience balanced stones may stand for "months" if undisturbed, and that he knocks his rock piles over himself, once he has photographed and documented them.

== Motivations ==
Balancing rocks is seen by those who perform it as a meditative and creative activity, with artists saying that the process of physically handling and balancing the stones provides them with mental health benefits. Some compare the impermanence of the structures to zen buddhism.

Rock balancing is also undertaken competitively, with events and festivals including the Balanced Art World International festival in Ottawa, Canada, and the European Stone-Stacking Championships in Scotland.

== Opposition ==
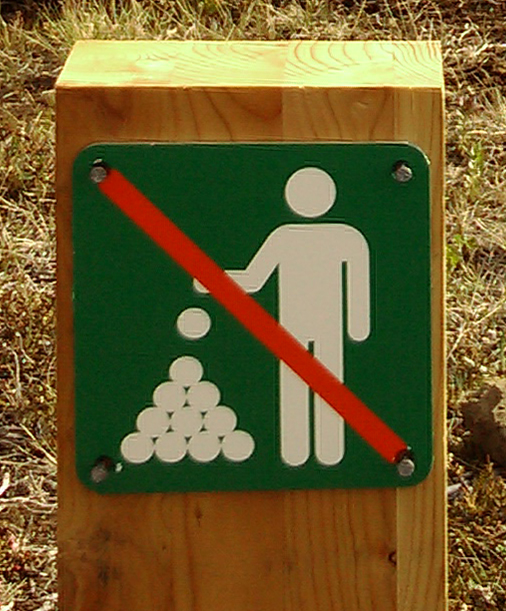
Don't make cairns, icon on a sign at Ásbyrgi, Iceland.

The number of rock piles created in this manner in natural areas is of concern to conservationists, because the process can expose the soil to erosion and aesthetically intrude upon the natural landscape. Rock stacking in national parks has been called vandalism by the US National Park Service and by the Queensland Parks and Wildlife Service. Historic England have said that stone piling near a scheduled monument would be illegal if judged to have been at risk of damaging the site, and the Countryside Code of England and Wales encourages people to "leave rocks, stone, plants and trees as you find them". On the Isle of Skye more than 100 locals organized to dismantle rock stacks left there by tourists, and some walkers in the United Kingdom regularly kick over stone stacks in protest against the damage they do to the environment and existing structures.

Some parks use deliberate arrangements of rocks as navigational guides to hikers, with the Gorham Mountain trail at Acadia National Park using markers of a flat rock on two "legs" with another rock on top pointing in the direction of the trail, for the benefit of those who have lost their way. Hobbyists stacking rocks in the wilderness risk confusing such messages.

One draw of the outdoors is a perception of solitude, and many people see rock piles as an aesthetic intrusion on the landscape, and an unwelcome reminder that even in the wilderness, they're surrounded by the presence of other people. Leave No Trace recommends that rock balancers dismantle their piles and return the stones to their original locations when they're finished. "Disturbing or collecting natural features (plants, rocks, etc.) is prohibited" in US national parks because these acts may harm the flora and fauna dependent on them.

=== Destruction of wildlife and habitats ===
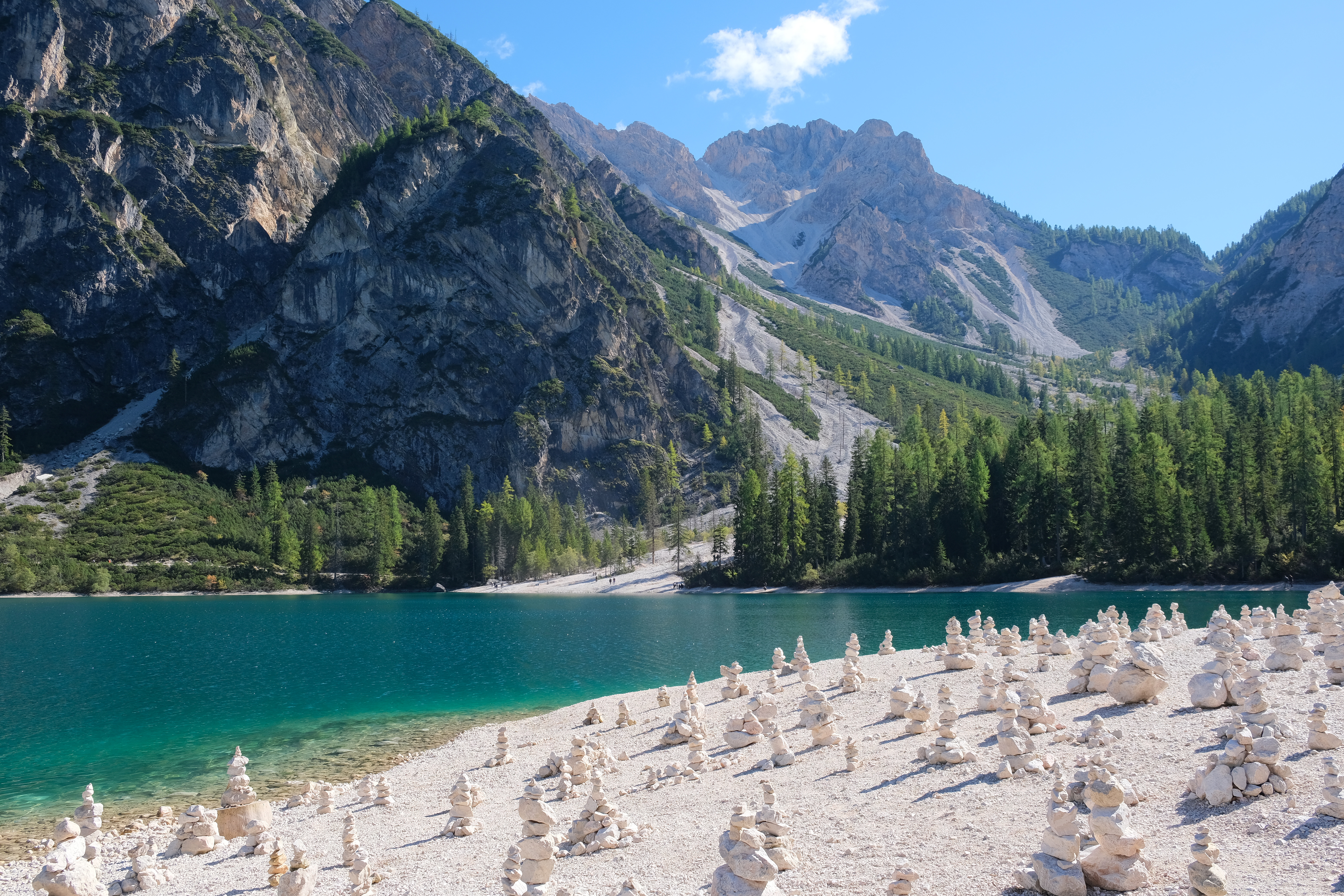
Stacks of stones can radically change a landscape, like here by Lake Braies, South Tyrol, Italy.

Rock piling in streams silts the water, disrupts critical habitat, and can kill rare wildlife. In a river in Pisgah National Forest, scientists have repeatedly found protected Eastern hellbender salamanders crushed under the piles of rocks that tourists build midstream. In addition to the direct killing that takes place while the rocks are being moved, the flat cobbles that would make the best cover for hellbenders to live under tend to be the same individual rocks that rock pilers seek out to incorporate into balanced piles, chutes, and dams; this activity makes the best rocks unavailable to be used as habitat.

Dismantling the piles and dispersing the stones does not seem to prevent their being repeatedly stacked into new piles. The biologists suspect that rock piling may be a widespread conservation problem for hellbenders, a rapidly disappearing species that is a candidate for Endangered Species Act protection, throughout their range, especially wherever they exist in easily accessible streams on public lands.

In Australia, rock-stacking was listed along with logging, mining and track construction as one of the threats to a newly discovered population of the mountain skink, a poorly-documented lizard species, in Wombat State Forest.

== Notable artists ==
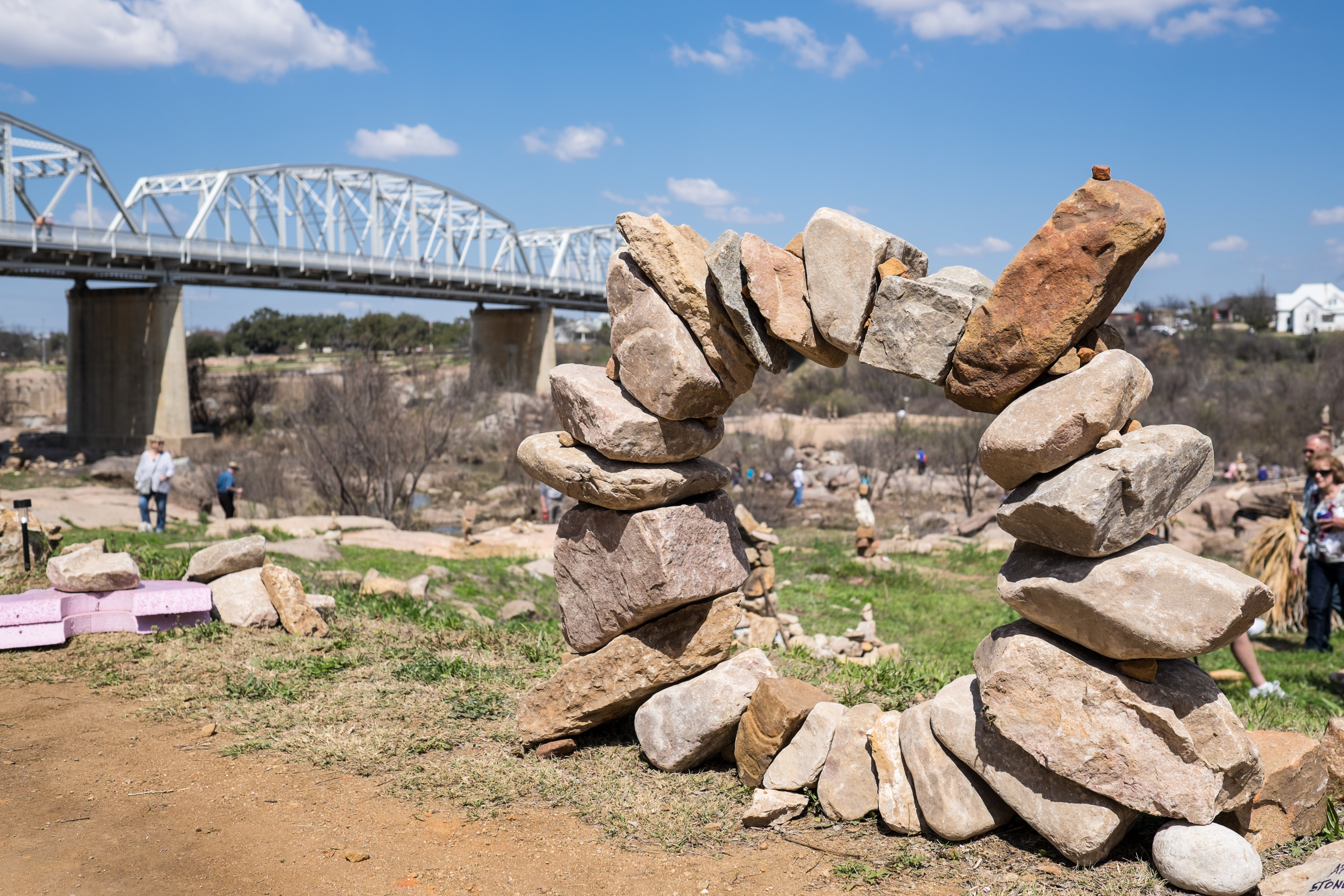
2014 Rock Stacking World Championship in Llano, Texas

- Bill Dan, American artist
- Andy Goldsworthy, artist for whom rock balancing is a minor subset of his "Collaborations with Nature"
- Michael Grab, balance artist and photographer, born Alberta, Canada*
- Adrian Gray, UK artist specialising in stone balancing sculptures and photography

== See also ==
- Cairn
- Environmental art
- Inuksuk
- Rocking stone
- Rock on Top of Another Rock
- Sea stack
- Street art
- Trail ethics
- Yarn bombing
