= Rivers and Tides =

2001 Anglo-German film directed by Thomas Riedelsheimer

- DVD box art
- Directed by: Thomas Riedelsheimer
- Written by: Thomas Riedelsheimer
- Produced by: Annedore von Donop; Trevor Davies; Leslie Hills
- Starring: Andy Goldsworthy
- Cinematography: Thomas Riedelsheimer
- Edited by: Thomas Riedelsheimer
- Music by: Fred Frith
- Distributed by: Roxie Releasing
- Release dates: 27 April 2001 (Germany); 2 January 2003 (U.S.)
- Running time: 90 minutes
- Countries: Germany; Finland; United Kingdom
- Language: English

Rivers and Tides is a 2001 documentary film directed by Thomas Riedelsheimer about the British artist Andy Goldsworthy, who creates intricate and ephemeral sculptures from natural materials such as rocks, leaves, flowers, and icicles. The music was composed and performed by Fred Frith and was released on a soundtrack, Rivers and Tides (2003).

The film received a number of awards, including the ‘Best Documentary’ awards of the San Diego Film Critics Society and the San Francisco Film Critics Circle. It is an Anglo-German co-production by Mediopolis Film and the British independent film company Skyline Productions.

In 2018, Goldsworthy, Riedelsheimer, and composer Frith released a follow-up documentary, Leaning Into the Wind.

== Reception ==
On review aggregator website Rotten Tomatoes, the film holds an approval rating of 99% based on 71 reviews, with an average rating of 8.2/10.
