= Greenmuseum.org =

Defunct online art museum via website

- Established: 21 December 2001
- Dissolved: 2019
- Location: online
- Type: environmental and ecological art; educational resources
- Visitors: 3,000-3,500 per day in 2009
- Executive director: Sam Bower

Greenmuseum.org was a nonprofit online museum of environmental art. Since its launch in 2001, greenmuseum.org had become a source for information about this global art movement, which includes ecoart (or ecological art), land art, art in nature and related terms. It was formed by a group of artists in the San Francisco Bay Area who were interested in ecology who had observed that a museum did not exist that was dedicated to the history art and ecology.

== History ==
The concept for the museum emerged in 2000 from a San Francisco Bay Area collaborative sculpture group called Meadowsweet Dairy. Members of the collective included Sam Bower, Glenda Griffith, Henry Corning, Dan Ustin, Alan Leavitt, Tyler Johnson and Alex Tereshkin. These artists recognized the need for a cultural infrastructure to support ecological artwork and artists. Through a series of meetings, the name greenmuseum.org was arrived upon, and the collective applied for non-profit status. The site was launched on December 21, 2001.

== Online museum ==
The online museum featured the work of over 130 international artists including those from the U.S., Mexico, Australia, New Zealand, Japan, Germany, Denmark, Iran, Israel, Korea, Spain, South Africa, and the United Kingdom. The featured artists were organized into fourteen classifications such as: agitation, art-in-nature, documentation, natural processes, performance, restoration, propaganda, etc. As an online museum it was free to visit and open 24 hours a day throughout the year. In 2009 it received between 3,000 and 3,500 visitors per day (over one million visitors in 5 years). The website provided a forum for discussion, a "toolbox" of practical resources for educators, policy makers, scientists, and communities, as well as the artists, exhibitions and event listings. Some of the educational resources available on greenmuseum.org were syllabi, essays and online exhibitions.

Greenmuseum curated online exhibitions highlighting themes and issues, and made possible the printed and online catalogue of the Contemporary Arts Center of Cincinnati's Ecovention: current art to transform ecologies exhibition in 2002, a collaboration with ecoartspace. In partnership with Amber Lotus Publishers, greenmuseum.org published a calendar of environmental art. Greenmuseum.org also hosted greenmuseumWiki, an interactive online community discussion space.

Greenmuseum.org focused on developments in the environmental art movement and helped facilitate collaborative partnerships between a range of people, places and organizations. Its activities were designed to stimulate the diffusion of ecological art aesthetics, ideas and working methods to facilitate the creation of a more sustainable world culture. Greenmuseum's founder Sam Bower suggested that artists "begin thinking seriously about ecological problems and their solutions" and that artists in the 21st century and such institutional settings like sculpture parks "urgently need a more constructive relationship between our species and the natural world. We can no longer afford the vacationer’s emphasis on art for art’s sake”.

After being active from 2001 to 2008, the website was closed in 2019, though an archived snapshot copy is available.

== Reception ==
Allison L. Compton wrote a feature article, A Site for Environmental Art: GreenMuseum.org in the journal Public Art Review.

== See also ==
- Environmental sculpture
- Site-specific art
