= Eaman =

Eaman is both a given name and surname. Notable people with the name include:

- Eaman al-Gobory (fl. 2003–2008), Iraqi physician
- Keith Eaman (born 1947), Canadian football player

== See also ==
- Eamonn
