= Ranitha =

Ranitha is a given name. Notable people with the name include:

- Ranitha Gnanarajah, Sri Lankan human rights activist
- Ranitha Liyanarachchi (born 1994), Sri Lankan cricketer
