= Bianka Zalewska =

Polish journalist

Bianka Zalewska 2023

Bianka Zalewska (born 1979 in Biała Podlaska) is a Polish humanitarian worker and journalist. She has covered the Russian invasion of Ukraine. She was awarded the International Women of Courage Award in 2023.
