= Canan Gullu =

Turkish activist (born 1962)

Canan Güllü
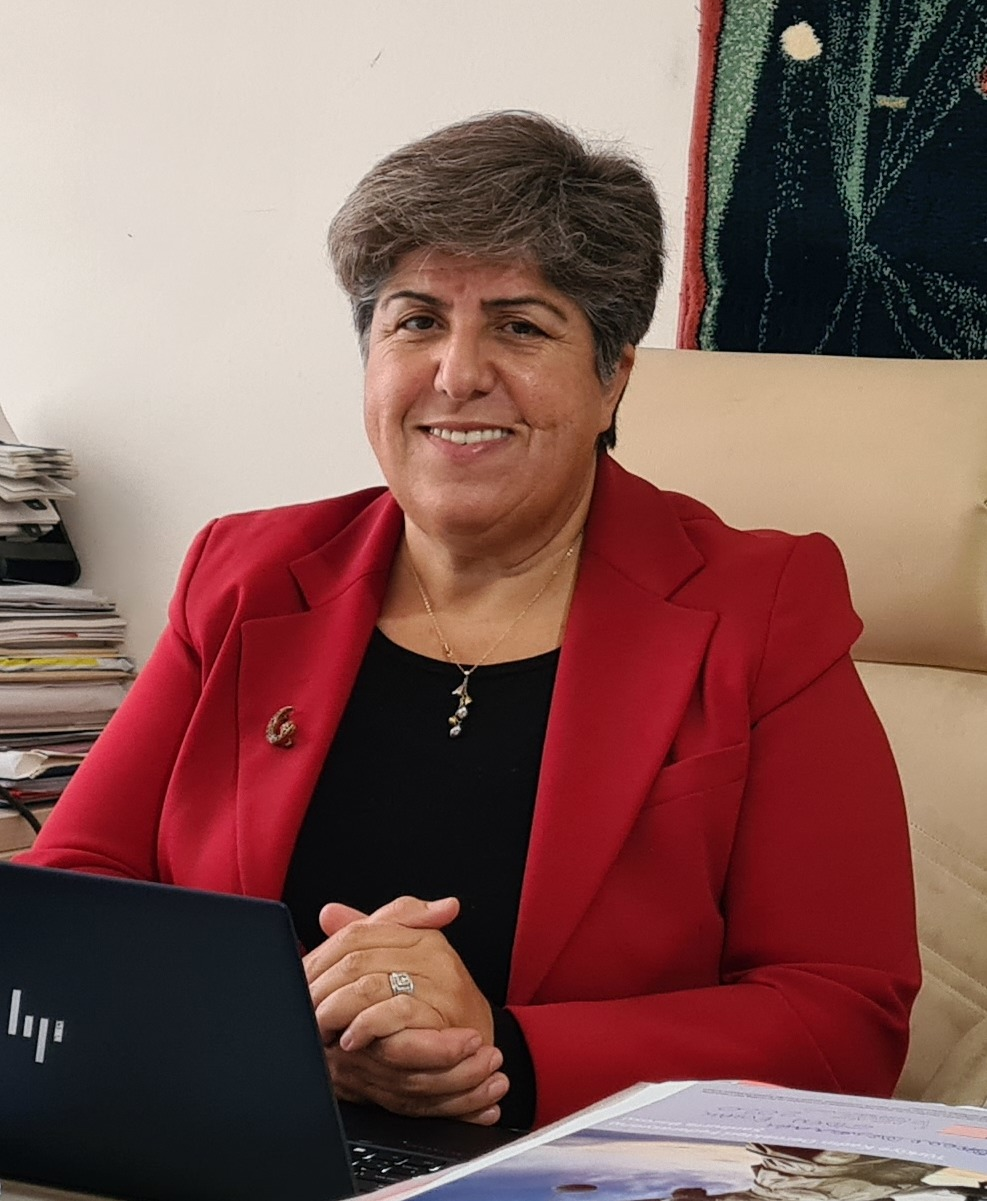
- Born: 1962 (age 63–64)
- Occupations: organiser and activist
- Known for: President of the Federation of Women Associations of Turkey (TKDF)

Canan Güllü (born 1962) is a Turkish activist who is the President of the Federation of Women Associations of Turkey (TKDF). She was awarded the International Women of Courage Award in 2021.

== Life ==
Canan Gullu has been an activist and organizer since the 1980s when she began working with her mother at the age of nine.

She became the president of the Federation of Women Associations of Turkey (TKDF). As a result of the organisations that are affiliated to that organization there are 186 branches and over 50,000 members. The organisation was formed in 1976 with originally five organisations. The organisation has been operating a help line since 2007.

The Istanbul Convention on Domestic Violence was framed on 11 May 2011. Gullu notes that Turkey was the first country to sign it, however Turkey's police have neither the staff or the training to implement it. She mentions hundreds who are killed in domestic violence and a huge increase in cases, but Gullu notes that this is difficult argue and to measure as Turkey fails to gather the necessary data. In fact Turkey tried to withdraw from the convention and Gullu saw her role to be to oppose this political expediency.

Turkey left the Istanbul convention (Council of Europe Convention, on preventing and combating violence against women) in March 2021. Her organisation did gather data on Femicide and the number of cases rose 341 in 2021 to 381 in 2022. Gullu noted that this was more than one woman a day.

== Awards ==
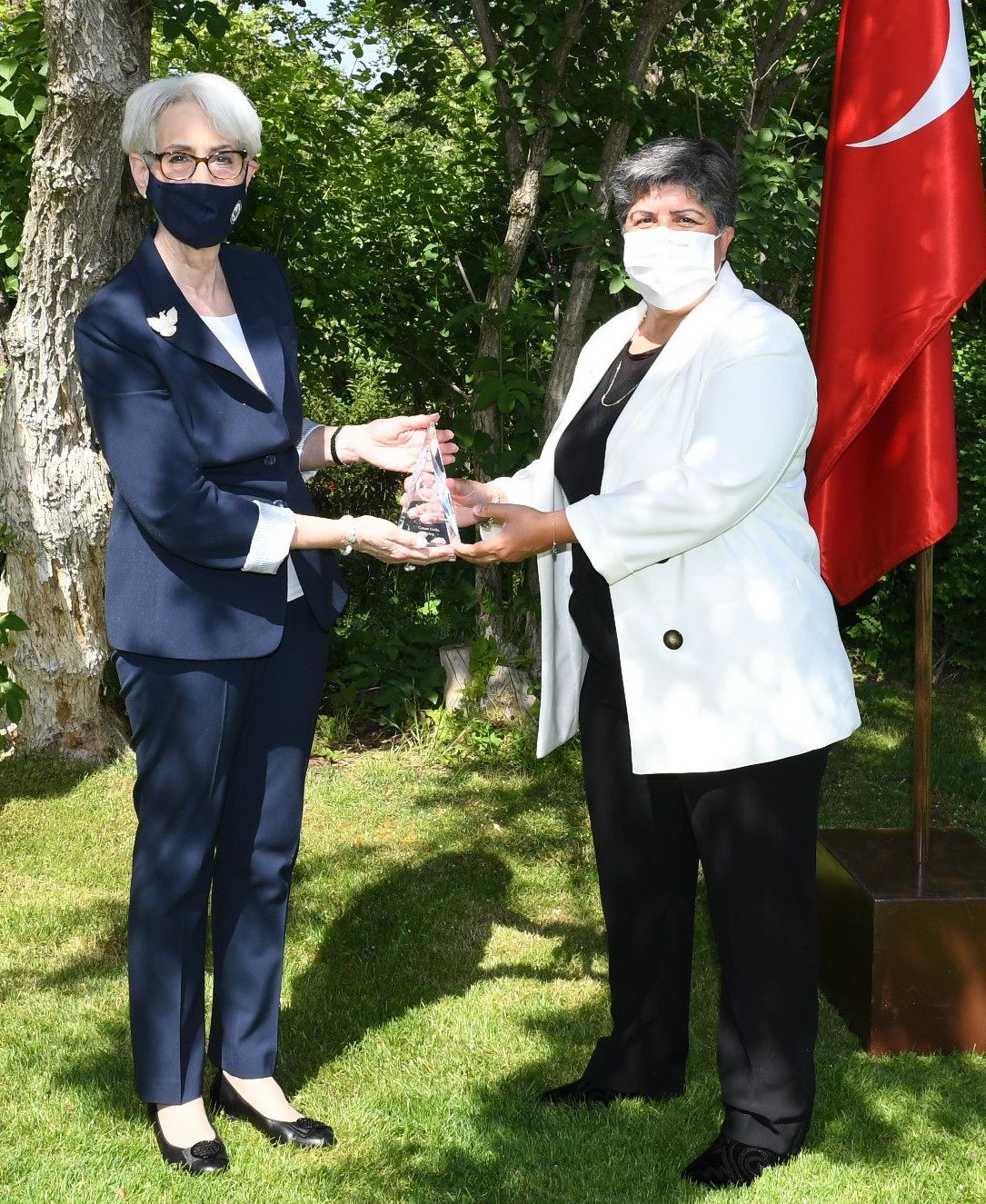
Güllü (right) receives the International Women of Courage Award from US Deputy Secretary of State Wendy Sherman in 2021

She was awarded the International Women of Courage Award in 2021. She had been nominated by the American ambassador to Turkey in December. The award was presented by the First Lady Jill Biden and the Secretary of State Antony Blinken on International Women's Day. She was identified as a "steadfast champion of gender equality, working to promote women's participation in governance, the labor force and education". There were fourteen living women given awards that year. The awardees were from fifteen countries as unusually the awards included an extra seven women who had died in Afghanistan.

== Publications include ==
- Syrian Refugee Women and Girls In Turkey & The Istanbul Convention (2019)

== Awards ==
- 2016 – Health and Social Aid Foundation (SSYV) Outstanding Manager Award
- 2018 – Atatürk Outstanding Woman Service Award
- 2020 – Canadian Embassy in Turkey Human Rights award
- 2020 – International Knidos Academy of Culture and Art (UKKSA) Lifetime Honorary Award
- 2020 – Turkish University Women "Leading Woman Award"
- 2021 – International Women of Courage Award
- ÇESAV Gold Medal
