= Maha Al Muneef =

Saudi Arabian activist

- لدكتورة مها عبدالله المنيف
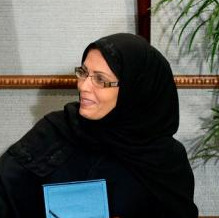
- Maha Al Muneef receiving award in March 2016
- Born: 1960 (age 65–66); Saudi Arabia
- Occupations: Pediatric infectious disease specialist, activist
- Known for: Executive Director of the National Family Safety Program (NFSP), domestic violence advocacy
- Awards: International Women of Courage Award (2014)

Maha Al Muneef (Arabic: لدكتورة مها عبدالله المنيف ; born 1960) is the executive director of the National Family Safety Program (NFSP) in Saudi Arabia. She is a specialist in pediatric infectious disease, and has worked to spread awareness about domestic violence and victims of child abuse.

== Life ==
Al Muneef was born in Saudi Arabia in 1960, the same year that girls were first allowed to be educated. She went to school and university in Saudi Arabia, but she indicates that her skills were honed during a decade of working in the USA. In Saudi Arabia she was told facts but in America she learnt how to work through a crisis.

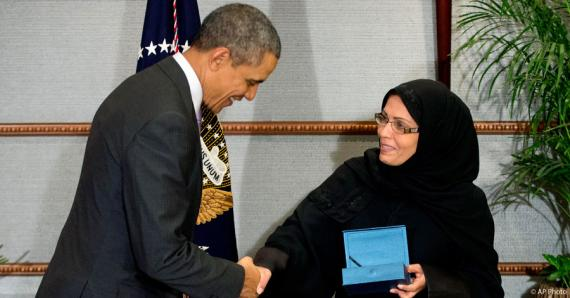
President Obama presents award to Al Muneef in 2016

From 2009 to 2013, Al Muneef also served as an adviser to Saudi Arabia's Consultative Council, the Shura Council. In August 2013, the Council of Ministers adopted landmark legislation to protect victims of domestic violence. Al Muneef and the National Family Safety Program played a role in drafting and advising on the "Protection from Abuse" law, which defines and criminalizes domestic violence for the first time in Saudi Arabia. Maha Al Muneef was also awarded the 2014 International Women of Courage Award for this humanitarian work in particular. She could not attend the ceremony so American President Barack Obama awarded her the prize in Saudi Arabia in April 2014.

The NFSP was created in 2005 in order to combat domestic violence and child abuse in Saudi Arabia. The NFSP has developed advocacy programs, reported on domestic violence and child abuse statistics in Saudi Arabia, and led efforts to provide services for victims of abuse.
