= Oinikhol Bobonazarova =

Tajikistani activist

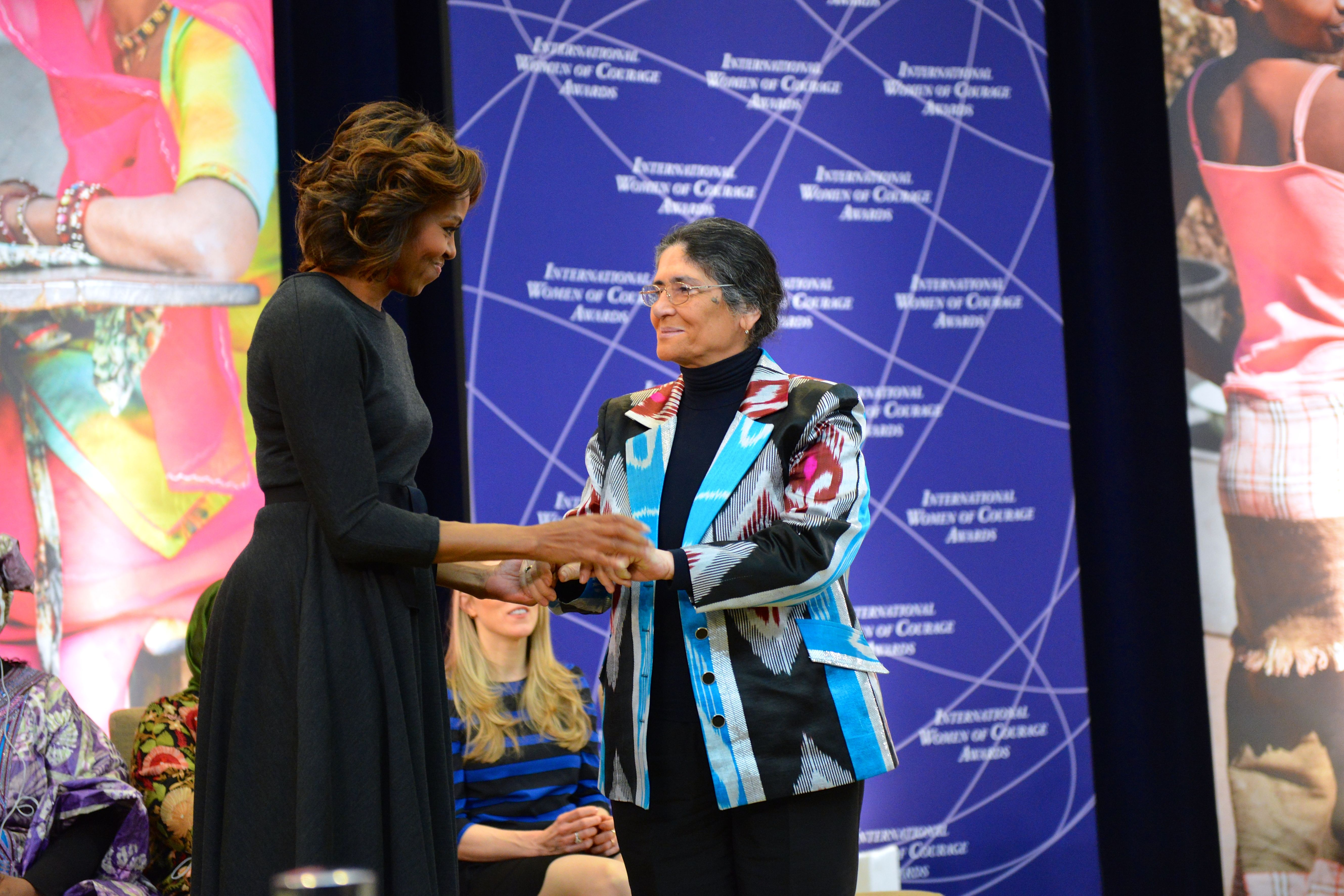
International Women of Courage Award, 2014. United States First Lady Michelle Obama with Oinikhol Bobonazarova of Tajikistan

Oinikhol Bobonazarova (Tajik: Ойниҳол Бобоназарова) is a Tajikistani activist. In 1993, she was arrested, and convicted of treason for supposedly plotting a coup. After serving a few months in jail, she became a human rights counselor in the Tajik office of the Organization for Security and Cooperation in Europe. She has also worked for the Tajik branch of the Open Society Foundation, and as of 2013 she is in charge of the “Perspektiva Plus” human rights group, which works for the rights of prisoners, women, and Tajikistani labor migrants. She has also worked to create Tajikistan's first independent prison monitoring program since its prisons were closed to outside access in 2004.

In 2013 she became the first woman to try to run for president in Tajikistan, but her campaign failed to gather enough signatures to continue.

She received a 2014 International Women of Courage award. She was the first Tajikistani woman to receive an International Women of Courage award.
