= Simone Sibilio do Nascimento =

Brazilian human rights activist

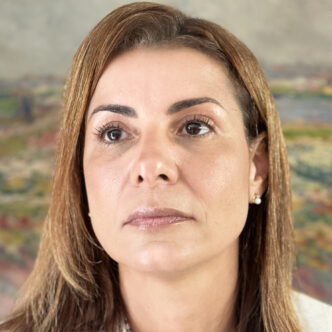
Simone Sibilio in 2022

Simone Sibilio do Nascimento is a Brazilian human rights activist. She is a prosecutor in the Rio de Janeiro State's Public Ministry (MPRJ). She works against combating organized crime and public corruption, militias, and drug trafficking. She was awarded the International Women of Courage Award in 2022.
