= Meaza Mohammed =

Ethiopian journalist and activist

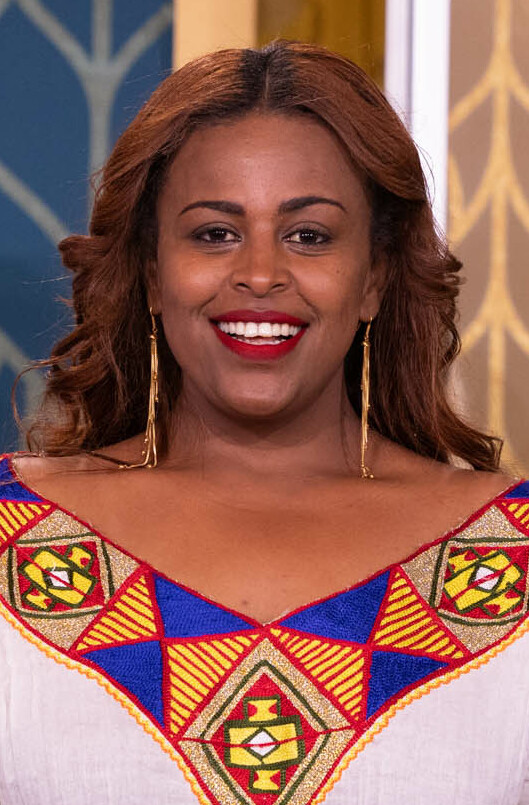
- Meaza in 2023
- Citizenship: Ethiopia
- Occupation: journalist
- Awards: International Women of Courage Award

Meaza Mohammed (Amharic: መዓዛ መሀመድ) is an Ethiopian journalist, human rights activist and founder of Roha TV. She was awarded the International Women of Courage Award in 2023.

Meaza was arrested the third time in 2022 for reporting impact of the war on women and children in Ethiopia.
