= Shafiqa Quraishi =

Afghan women's rights activist

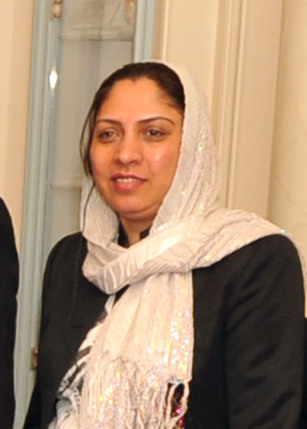
Shafiqa Quraishi in 2010

Shafiqa Quraishi (Dari: شفیقه قریشی) is an Afghan women's rights activist. As of 2010 she is a police colonel and the director of Gender, Human and Child Rights within the Ministry of the Interior of Afghanistan. She founded and led a working group on the Afghan National Gender Recruitment Strategy, with the goal of getting 5,000 women to work in the Ministry of the Interior and making the Ministry of the Interior better at serving the women of Afghanistan. She also worked for more benefits for working women such as childcare, healthcare, maternity care, security and skills training. She managed to obtain promotions for women working in the Afghan National Police who had been unfairly passed over for years. As of 2011 she was Afghanistan's most senior policewoman.

Quraishi had her work disrupted during the Taliban rule of Afghanistan from the mid-1990s until 2001.

She received a 2010 International Women of Courage award.
