= Veronica Simogun =

Papua New Guinea activist for women rights

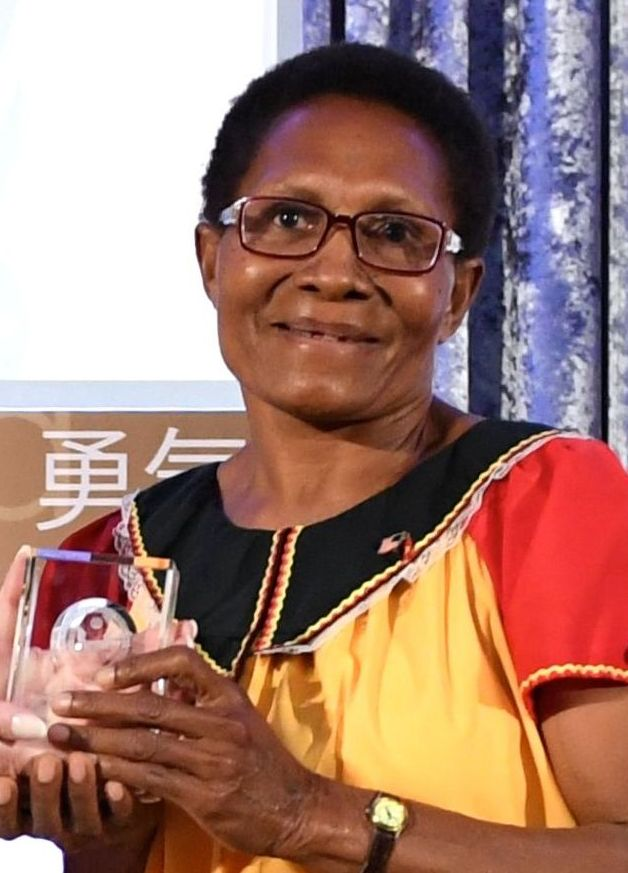
- Born: 1962 (age 63–64); Wewak, Papua New Guinea
- Occupation: Activist for women's rights
- Known for: International Women of Courage Award in 2017

Veronica Simogun (born 1962) is a Papua New Guinean activist for women's rights and against violence. She was awarded an International Women of Courage Award in 2017.

== Life ==
Simogun was born in 1962 near Wewak, in a village named Urip in the Boykin/Dagua, Papua New Guinea. Simogun has a certificate in civil aviation, which she gained at the Civil Aviation Training College. She worked for six years in civil aviation when she returned to Urip. In her home village she worked to improve local community. She campaigned against violence against women.

She was nominated for her work by Catherine Ebert-Gray for an International Women of Courage Award.
