= Naw K'nyaw Paw =

Karen women's rights activist

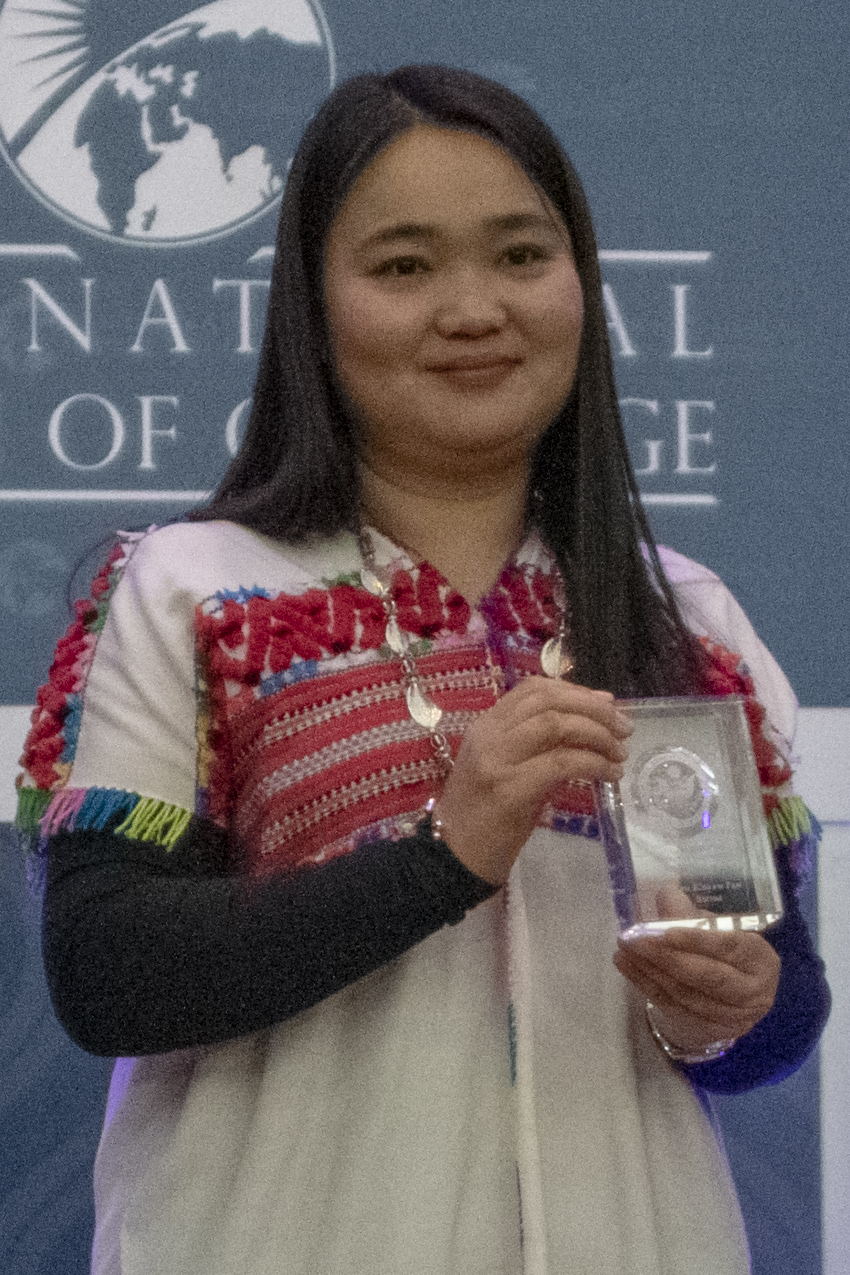
Naw K’nyaw Paw in 2019

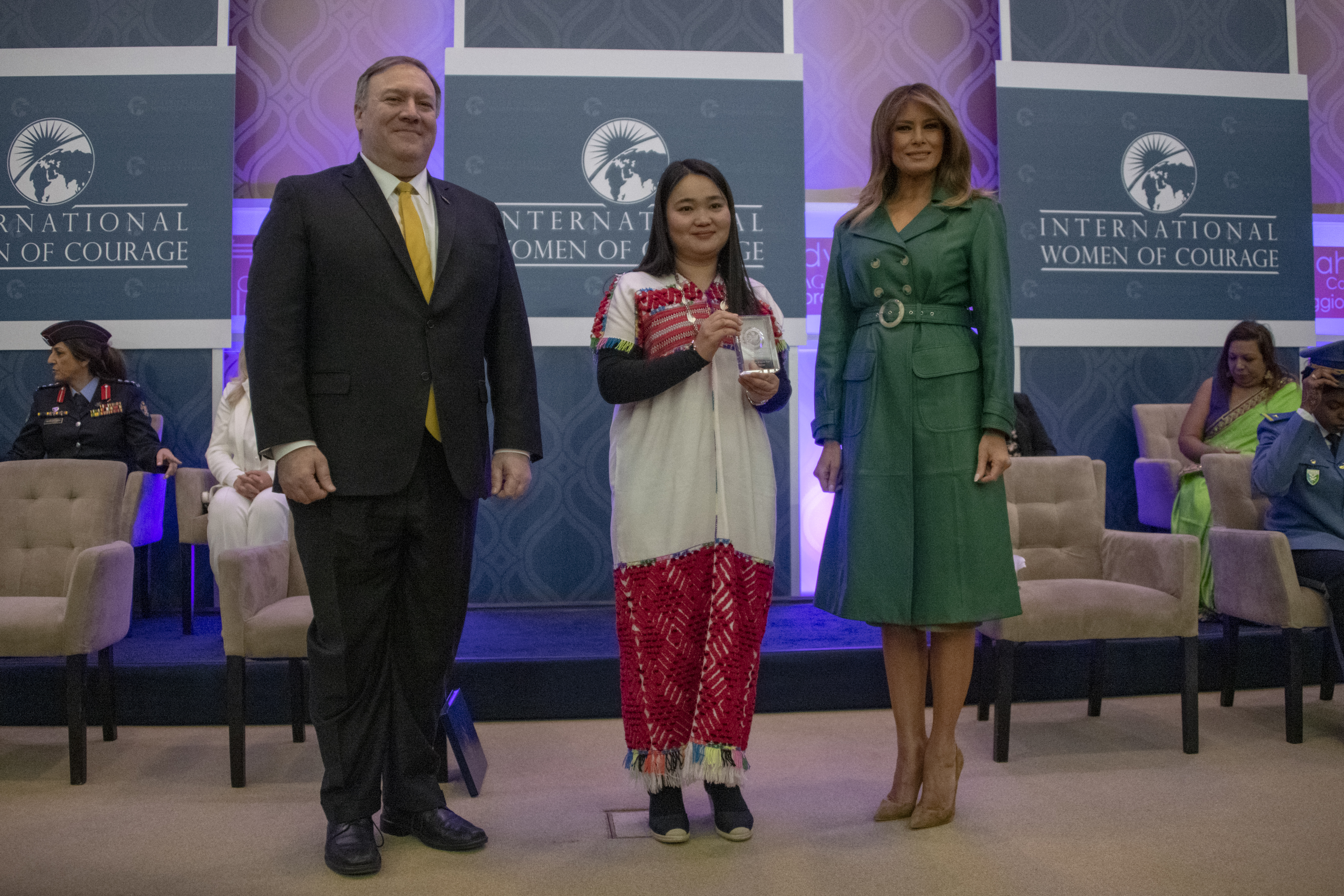
Naw K'nyaw Paw with U.S. Secretary of State Michael R. Pompeo and First Lady of the United States Melania Trump

Naw K'nyaw Paw is a Karen peace activist who works for women's rights in Myanmar. She is the General secretary of the Karen Women’s Organisation, and won an International Women of Courage Award in 2019.

== Biography ==
Naw K’nyaw Paw was born in Thailand and as a young child grew up in a refugee camp. Her family was forced to flee their home in order to escape persecution. The family joined approximately 110,000 Karen people now living in seven refugee camps that run the length of the Thai- Burma border.

In 1999, she began working for the Karen Women’s Organization (KWO), a community-based organization of Karen women working in development and relief in the refugee camps on the Thai border. She was elected as its General Secretary at the 6th Karen Women Organization Conference held in February 2013. She is a strong promoter of capacity buildings and has run many democracy, human rights and women rights trainings for KWO members. She worked hard to take the Karen struggle to the international community. Naw K’nyaw Paw has advocated on behalf of the Karen people.

She has attended UN Human Rights Council and the Commission on the Status of Women meetings to raise concerns about the situation for women and indigenous and refugee rights in Burma and along the border.

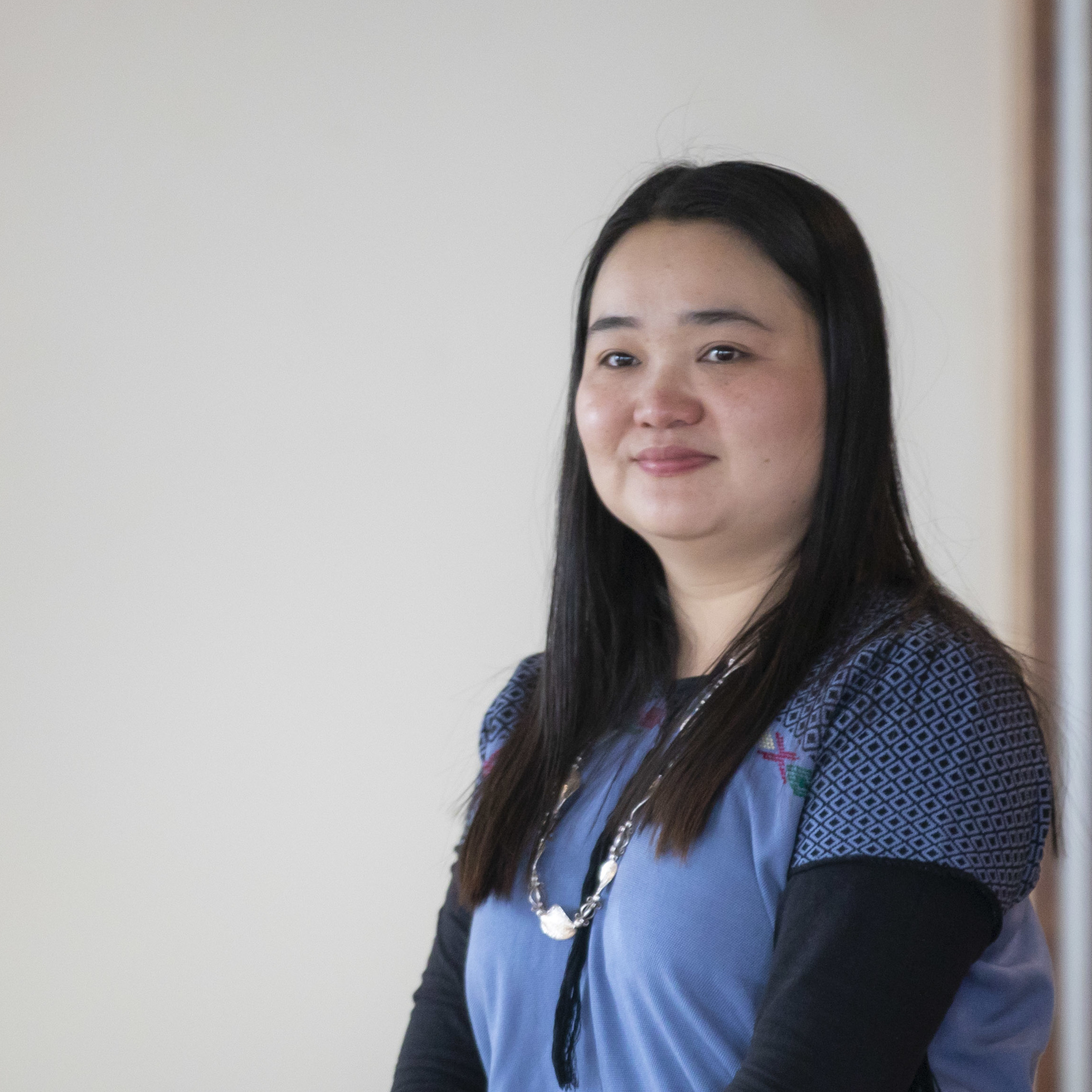
Naw K’nyaw Paw 2019 International Women of Courage
