= Saadet Özkan =

Turkish activist against child abuse (born 1978)

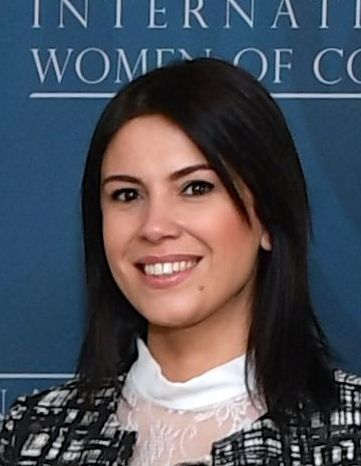
- Saadet Özkan at the 2017 International Women of Courage Award ceremony
- Born: June 15, 1978 (age 47); İzmir, Turkey
- Occupation: Teacher
- Known for: Human rights activist

Saadet Özkan

Chairwoman of the UCİM
- Incumbent
- Assumed office July 11, 2017
- Preceded by: Position established

Saadet Özkan (born June 15, 1978) is a Turkish activist against child abuse. She is a primary school teacher who found out that her pupils had been sexually abused by her principal. Despite pressure, she succeeded in getting the crime investigated. She is an International Women of Courage Award recipient.

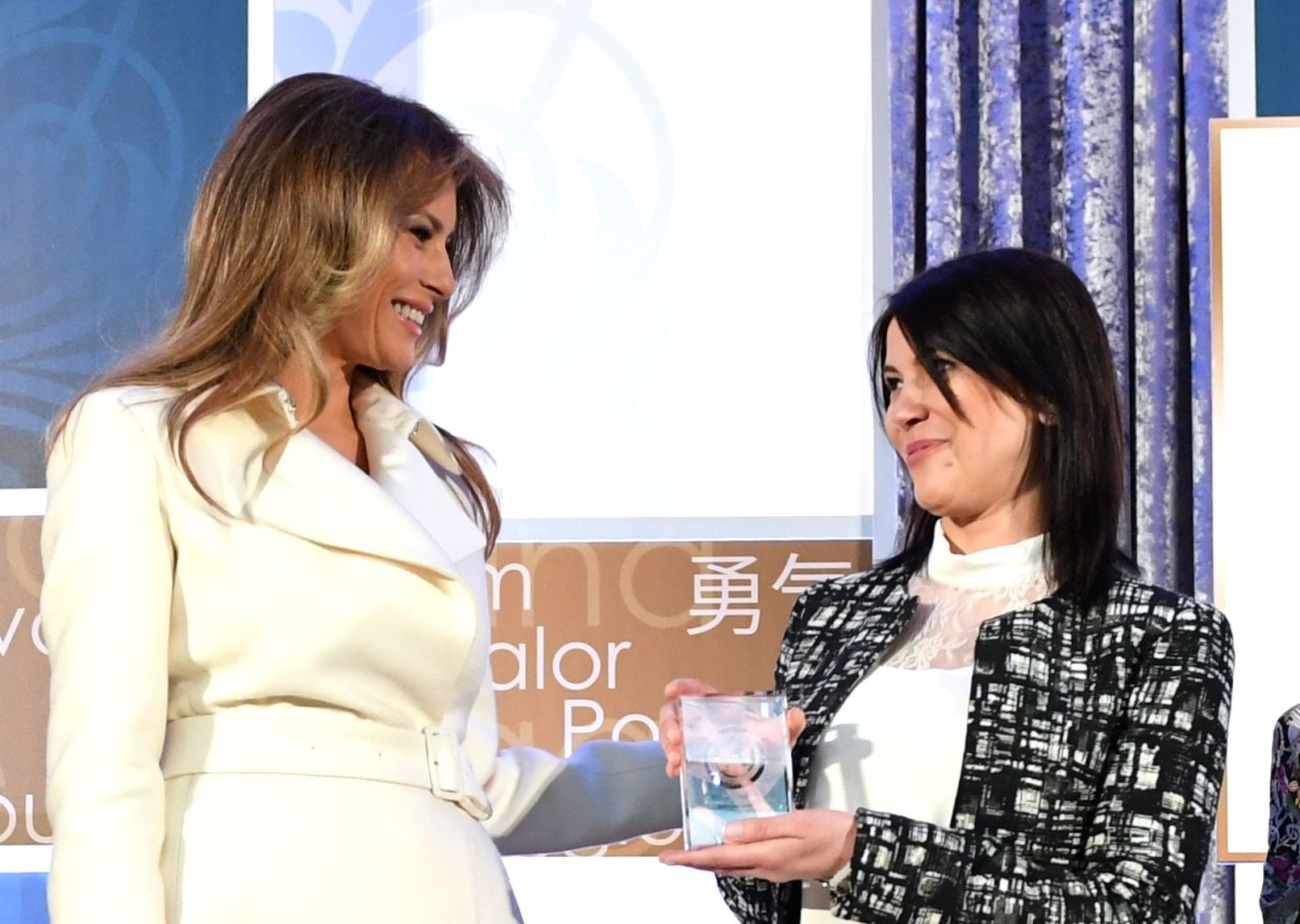
Saadet Özkan with Melania Trump at the International Women of Courage Award 2017
