= Rita Nyampinga =

Zimbabwean women prisoner campaigner

Dr Rita Nyampinga
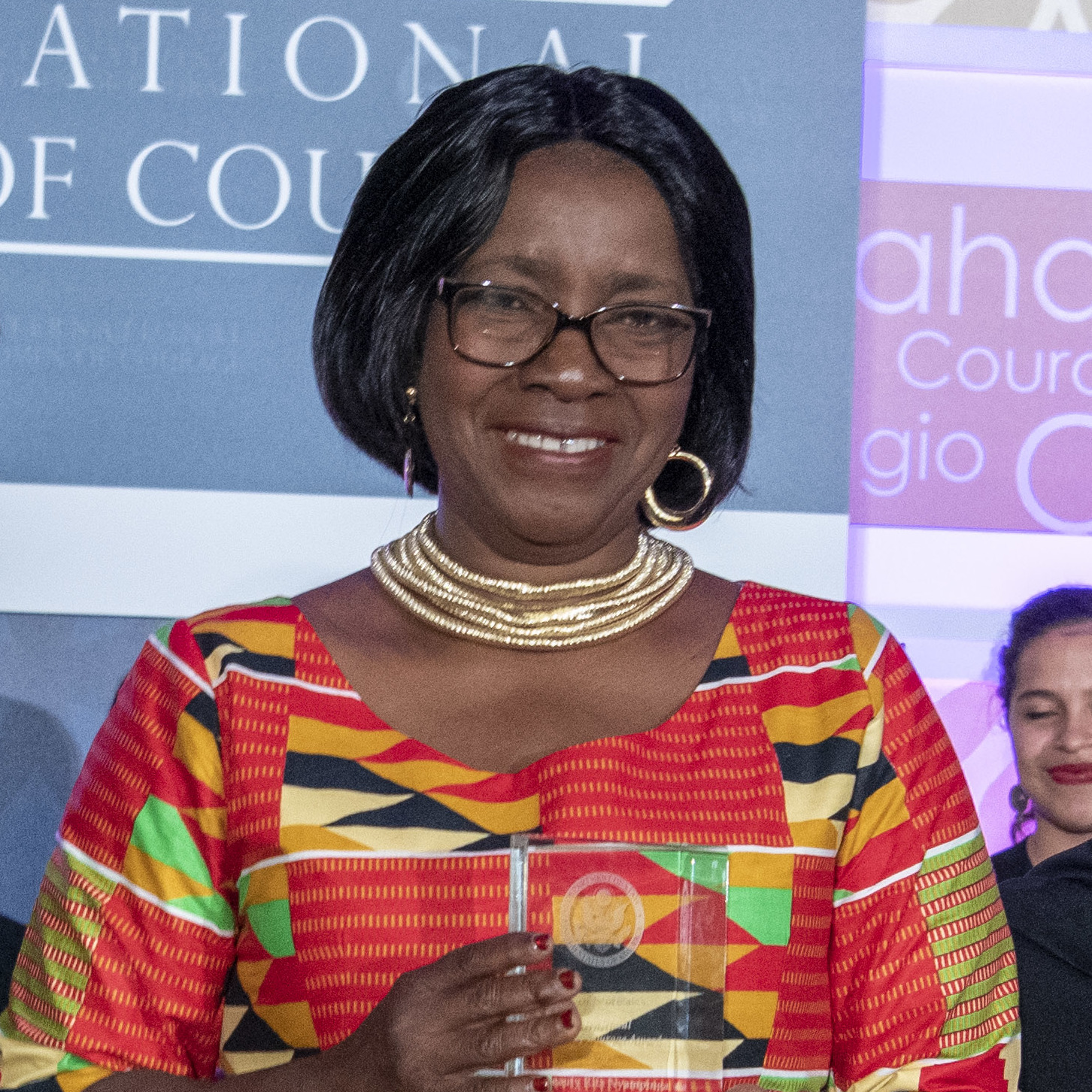
- Nyampinga in 2020
- Born: Beauty Rita Nyampinga; 1958 (age 67–68); Zimbabwe
- Citizenship: Zimbabwean
- Occupation: Human rights activist
- Organizations: Female Prisoners Support Trust; Crisis in Zimbabwe Coalition; Women Coalition of Zimbabwe; Women Academy on Political Leadership Excellence; Women AIDS Support Network
- Known for: Advocacy for women prisoners' rights
- Title: Director of Female Prisoners Support Trust
- Awards: International Women of Courage Award (2020); Female Human Rights Activist of the Year (2014)

Dr Beauty Rita Nyampinga (born 1958) is a Zimbabwean campaigner for women prisoners. She was chosen as an International Woman of Courage in March 2020 by the US Secretary of State.

== Background ==
Beauty Rita Nyampinga was born in 1958.

She joined a trade union in 1983 and this brought her into conflict with authorities. In 2007 she was protesting about the non availability of anti-retroviral drugs when she was arrested. Whilst she was imprisoned overnight she became aware of the terrible conditions for prisoners. Six women had to share a bucket for a toilet and disposing of used sanitary pads was embarrassing and difficult. She decided that she must help people who were like her imprisoned but for longer times. She decided that the traumatic shock of prison was much more for women than for men.

Years later she organised a "Female Prisoners Support Trust" that assists women and their children who are imprisoned. She became the director, but there was no funding and no office. It was officially registered in 2012, but it had been operating from 2010.

Women who served their sentences could find that being released was not the end of their punishment. After long sentences for serious crimes like infanticide they could find that their husbands had married again and their families would shun them.

She is active for several causes and is a member of Crisis in Zimbabwe Coalition, Women Coalition of Zimbabwe, Women Academy on Political Leadership Excellence, and the Women AIDS Support Network.

== Awards and recognition ==
Dr. Nyampinga won the Female Human Rights Activist of the Year in 2014 from Alpha Media House.

Nyampinga was chosen as an International Woman of Courage in March 2020 by the US Secretary of State.
