= Hana Elhebshi =

Libyan activist and architect

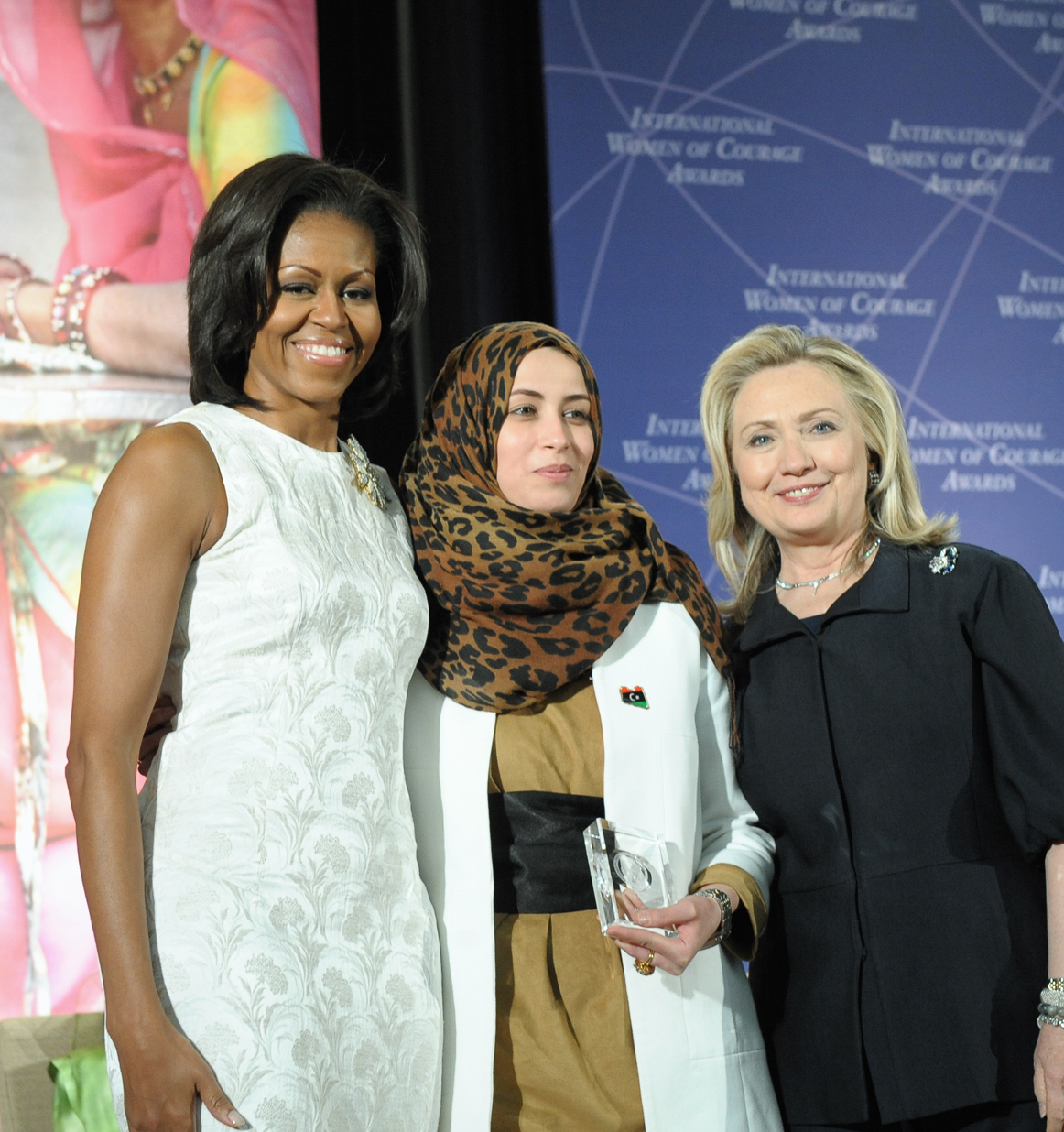
Hana El Hebshi with U.S. Secretary of State Hillary Clinton and First Lady Michelle Obama in 2012.

Hana Elhebshi (Arabic: هناء الحبشي; born c. 1985) is a Libyan activist and architect.

Elhebshi worked as an architect in Tripoli. Her father was a military commander running the Air Force at the base in Noviaga.

She became an activist during the Libyan revolution even though she had not been politically active before. She became a cyberactivist, reporting the siege of Tripoli online. She advised NATO strikes and made public how many people were killed by Muammar Gaddafi's regime during the Libyan revolution. She also wanted to speak out to tell the world about the suffering in Libya that had gone on for years. She used the name "Numidia" for her activism, a reference her Berber heritage, to protect her identity. As part of her effort to disseminate information, she contacted news organizations such as Al Jazeera. She also fought for women's rights in Libya.

She received a 2012 International Women of Courage award. Elhebshi was one of ten honorees in 2012 who were honored at an awards ceremony U.S. Department of State in Washington, D.C. featuring Secretary of State Hillary Clinton and First Lady Michelle Obama. The award recipients also embarked on a three-week tour of the United States sharing stories about their activism. The tour included stops in Pittsburgh, Pennsylvania; Bozeman, Montana; Cincinnati, Ohio; East Lansing, Michigan; Indianapolis, Indiana; Jackson, Wyoming; Kansas City, Missouri; Minneapolis, Minnesota; Pensacola, Florida; St. Louis, Missouri; Salt Lake City, Utah; and Seattle, Washington.
