= Carmen Gheorghe =

Romani women's rights activist

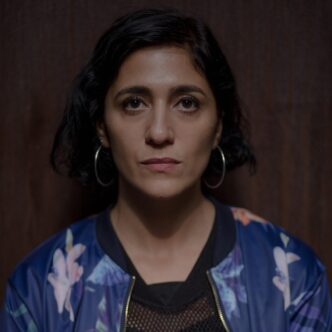
Carmen Gheorghe (2022).

Carmen Gheorghe is an activist who works for Roma women’s rights. She is the president of E-Romnja which promotes Roma women's rights. She was awarded the International Women of Courage Award in 2022.
