= Hawa Abdallah Mohammed Salih =

Sudanese activist

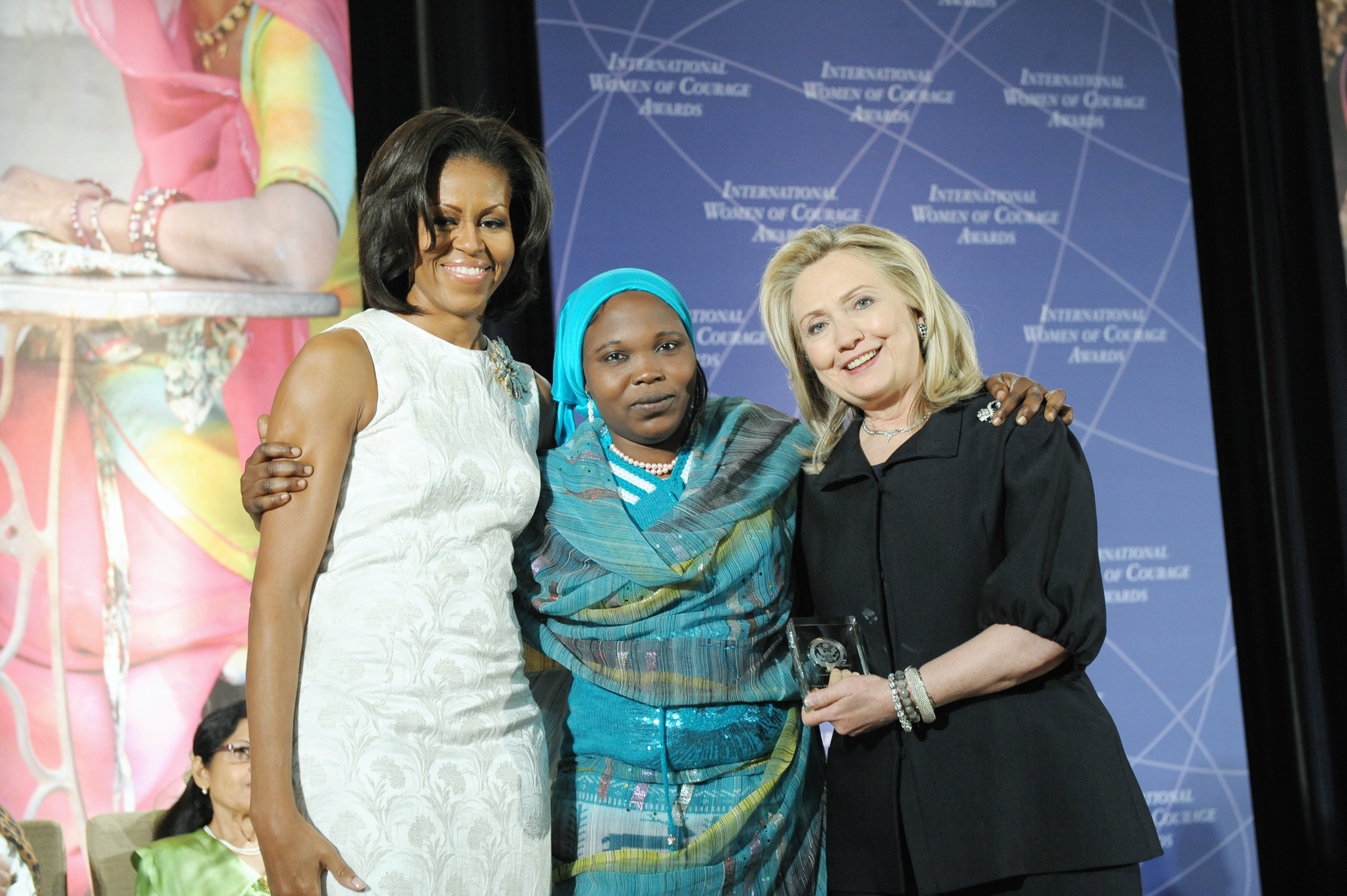
- Salih with Michelle Obama and Hillary Clinton.
- Born: North Darfur
- Citizenship: Sudan
- Occupation: Activist

Hawa Abdallah Mohammed Salih (Arabic: حواء عبد الله محمد صالح) is a Sudanese activist.

== Early life ==
She was born in North Darfur but had to leave due to fighting between government forces and Darfuri rebels.

== Career ==
She moved to Abu Shouk internally displaced persons camp, where she worked with United Nations officials and the American NGO IRC to spread information and awareness about the conditions in the camp. For her work she was arrested three times, and kidnapped twice by National Security and detained, including a time in 2011 when she was held for two months and tortured and raped in a state prison in Khartoum. She had to flee Sudan in 2011.

She received a 2012 International Women of Courage award.

She won asylum in the United States. She was represented on a pro bono basis by Mary Gay Scanlon, later a member of the U.S. House of Representatives from Pennsylvania.
