= Yasmin al Qadhi =

Yemeni journalist (born 1986)

Yasmin Al Qadhi
- ياسمين القاضي
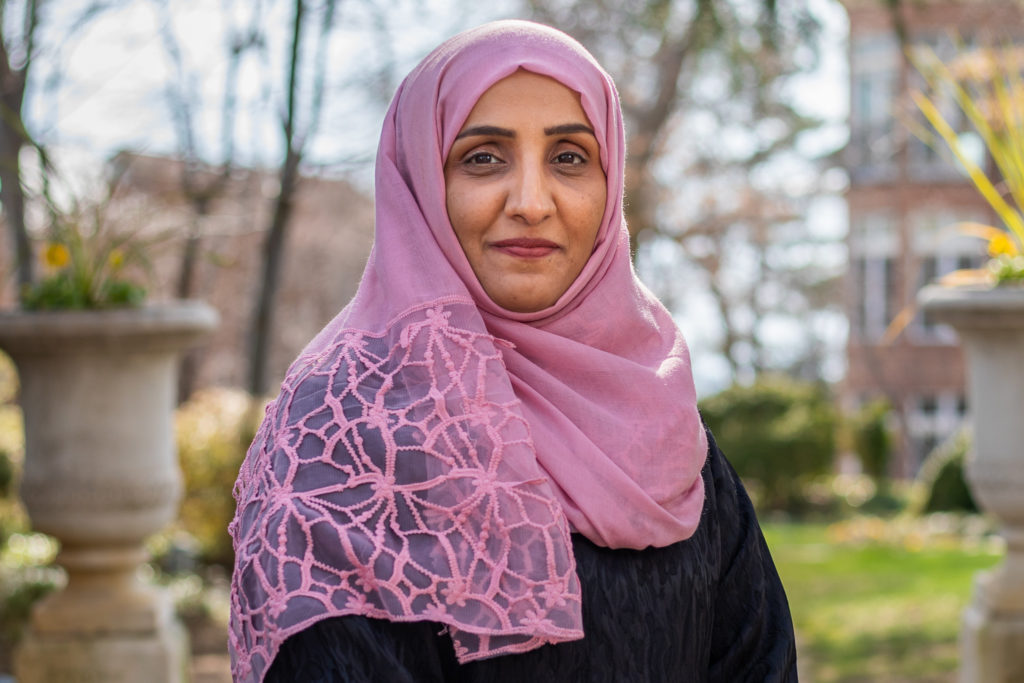
- in 2020
- Born: c. 1986
- Education: a university in Sanaa
- Known for: rescuing child soldiers

Yasmin Al Qadhi (Arabic:ياسمين القاضي; born c. 1986) is a Yemeni journalist who rescues child soldiers. She was chosen as an International Woman of Courage in March 2020.

== Life ==
She was born in about 1986 and brought up in a rural area. Her father encouraged her to think of a career despite the criticism he faced for allowing his daughters to work. She attended a university in Sanaa.

She worked for local newspapers and she was one of the first to speak out at "Change Square" and one of the first woman journalists to report on the Arab Spring as it emerged. She and her sister, Entisar al Qadhi, created the Marib Girl's Foundation in 2010 but it floundered. It was revived in 2015 when the war in Yemen broke out and the sisters could see the need. Yasmin had lost her 15-year nephew to the army. Peer pressure led him to apply and the recruiters did not reject him because he was too young.

She and her sister work with the Yemeni army to reduce the number of child soldiers. They aim to prevent children from being recruited and they work with senior officers to get child soldiers who are recruited, released.

She was one of the producers of a film that explained the problems facing women and children displaced by the war. She knows that women are willing to travel distances to attend university. Her foundation is encouraging employers to recruit them as these women do not want to be spectators to Yemen's future.

She was chosen as an International Woman of Courage on 4 March 2020 by the US Secretary of State. After the award she went to San Diego where she was welcomed for a four-day visit hosted by the San Diego Diplomacy Council.
