= Sundus Abbas =

Iraqi women's rights activist

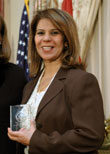
Dr. Sundus Abbas and her 2007 International Women of Courage Award

Sundus Abbas (Arabic: سندس عباس) is an Iraqi women's rights activist, who serves as the executive director of the Women's Leadership Institute in Baghdad, she has worked to improve women's rights. Abbas was trained as a political scientist, and she has worked to improve Iraqi women's involvement in their political parties, in the constitutional drafting and amending process, and in national reconciliation and conflict resolution efforts. She has also written for Iraq's main daily newspapers on the topic of women's rights, and held press conferences to address issues of concern to women, as well as teaching classes on decision-making. Abbas has also traveled throughout the Middle East for women's conferences and seminars. In 2007, she received an International Women of Courage Award.
