= Zakira Hekmat =

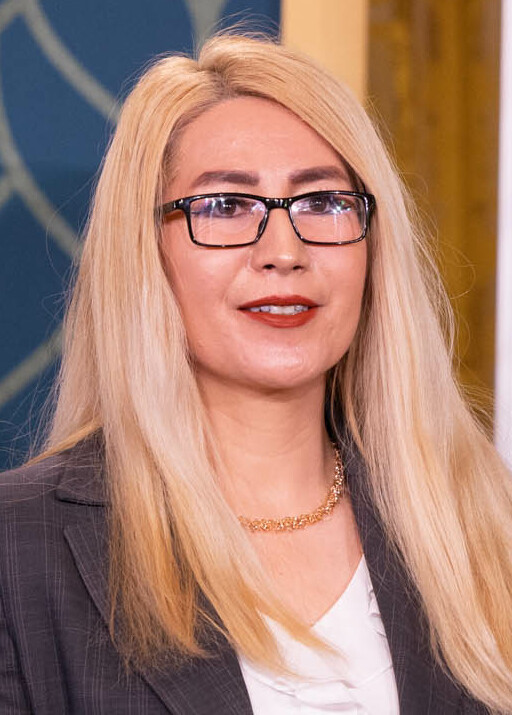
Zakira Hekmat 2023

Zakira Hekmat is an Afghan doctor and human rights activist. She founded the Afghan Refugee Solidarity Association(ARSA) in Turkey to work for the rights of all refugees and women. She was awarded the International Women of Courage Award (IWOC) in 2023.
