= Malalai Bahaduri =

Second lieutenant and senior instructor in the Afghan National Interdiction Unit(ANIU)

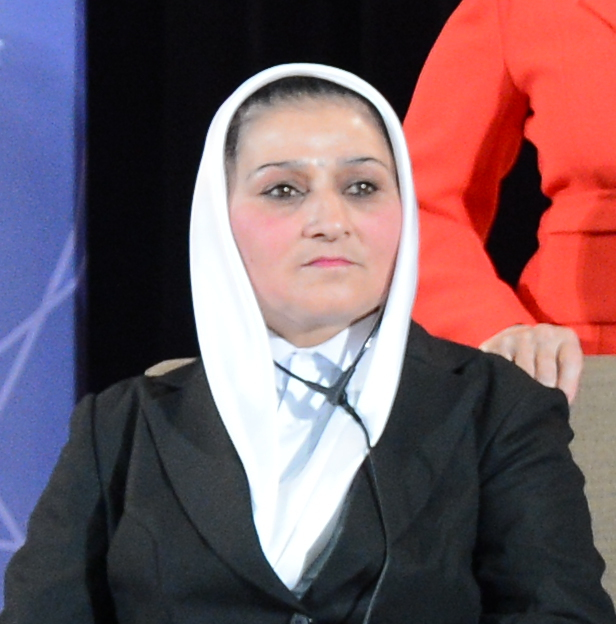
Malalai Bahaduri

Malalai Bahaduri is a Second Lieutenant and senior instructor in the Afghan National Interdiction Unit (NIU). She worked as a telecommunications operator, but decided to join law enforcement in 2002, after Taliban rule of Afghanistan ended. Bahaduri was threatened with death and physically abused by an uncle who objected to her doing so.

Bahaduri is the first female member of the Afghan NIU. She has participated in counternarcotics operations in all 34 provinces of Afghanistan.

Bahaduri received the 2013 International Women of Courage award.
