= Debra Baptist-Estrada =

Belizean politician

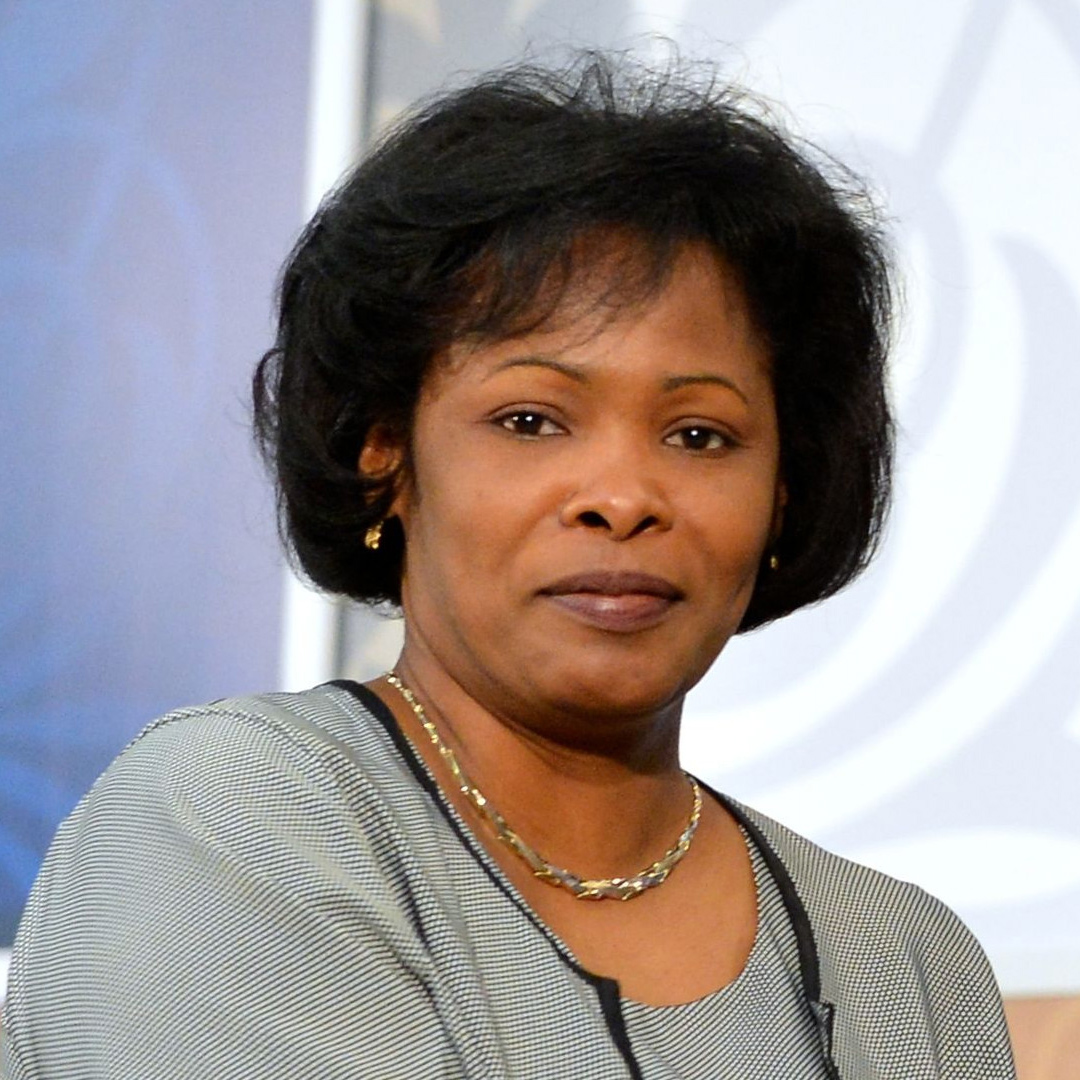
- in 2016
- Born: Belize
- Occupation: Director of the Immigration Department
- Known for: International Women of Courage Award

Debra Baptist-Estrada (born December 30, 1970), is the Director of the Immigration Department in Belize since 2019. In 2016, she received the International Women of Courage Award.

== Work ==
Baptist-Estrada holds an associate degree and became Port Commander of Philip S. W. Goldson International Airport, Belize City's international airport. She started working in the airport's immigration department in the mid-1990s. In 2015, she uncovered a drug and human smuggling ring operating to the United States and Europe. She later served as an immigration officer at the Santa Elena Border in Corozal, along Belize's northern border. She reportedly continuously refused bribes and enforced the immigration laws.

In 2016, she was invited to Washington DC, where she received the International Women of Courage Award from the US Secretary of State John Kerry. Presented annually on 8 March (International Women's Day) since 2007, the award recognises prominent women leaders.

In 2019, the Cabinet of Belize approved her appointment as the new Director of the Immigration Department. The decision was made despite other candidates holding higher academic qualifications. It was noted that while some of her colleagues had previously been denied US visas, Baptist-Estrada has been recognised by the United States Embassy for her integrity. She transitioned from the nationality section to succeed Diana Locke.

The following year, immigration became a central focus when Belizeans began returning home in March due to the COVID-19 pandemic. Baptist-Estrada assured citizens abroad that they were welcome to return, subject to health screening and mandatory self-isolate.
