= Velena Iga =

Papua New Guinean human rights activist

- Citizenship: Papua New Guinea
- Occupation: Women's rights activist
- Employer: Salvation Army
- Awards: International Women of Courage Award (2025)

Velena Iga is a Papua New Guinean human rights activist. A general for the Salvation Army in Papua New Guinea, she has advocated for the rights of female victims of abuse and violence, including domestic abuse, witch hunts and human trafficking. In 2025, Iga received the International Women of Courage Award from the United States government.

== Career ==
Iga is a general for the Salvation Army, and serves as the manager of its House of Hope in Port Moresby. She is the organisation's national contact person for issues of modern slavery and human trafficking.

Iga has campaigned for the rights of women and children impacted by violence in Papua New Guinea, including victims and survivors of domestic abuse, accusations of sorcery and trafficking. She devised the Human Trafficking Training Manual to educate communities throughout the country on how to recognise, report and support victims of trafficking and modern slavery, and established a national database to capture information and data linked to human trafficking in Papua New Guinea. Iga's campaigning has led to changes in Papua New Guinean law, including the amendment of its criminal code to explicitly criminalise human trafficking in the country.

Iga has established safe houses managed by the Salvation Army to offer a safe place for women to escape violent situations, where they can access support including counselling. She also established 1-Tok, a counselling helpline. Iga has partnered with international organisations including the Asia Foundation and the Australian High Commission in Papua New Guinea's Community Justice Fund to fund her programmes.

== Recognition ==
Iga was the keynote speaker at the PNG Press Club's open dialogue on human trafficking at the APEC Haus in July 2024.

On 1 April 2025, Iga was among eight women who received the International Women of Courage Award from the First Lady of the United States, Melania Trump, and the Secretary of State, Marco Rubio, at a ceremony in Washington, D.C..
