= Marie Claire Tchecola =

Guinean nurse and ebola survivor

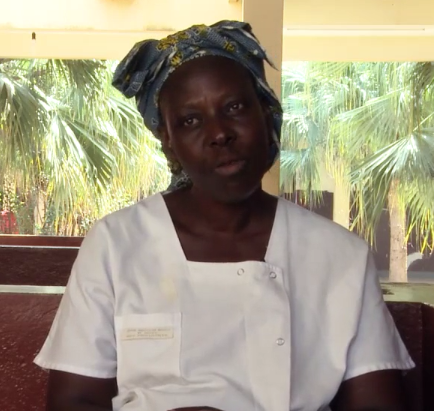
Marie Claire Tchecola - Ebola Survivor

Marie Claire Tchecola is a nurse and Ebola survivor from Guinea. She is an activist who educates about disease and fights stigma against those who suffer from disease. In 2015 she was awarded the International Women of Courage Award by the US State Department.

== Biography ==
Tchecola grew up in a small Guinean village near the Senegalese border. She was the first woman in her family to obtain an education. She earned her nursing credentials and was working as a nurse at Donka Hospital in Conakry, Guinea.

In July, 2014 she contracted Ebola, while treating a severely ill patient. A shortage of healthcare workers and basic protective equipment created a situation in West Africa where the disease was spreading rapidly. Recognizing the symptoms, she checked herself into a treatment center to prevent the spread of the disease. She recognized from her own experience that denial, doubt, and misinformation can prohibit people from getting proper treatment and taking proper precautions. After recovering from the disease, Tchecola returned to her job as an emergency room nurse at Donka Hospital, but her troubles were not over.

Tchecola's landlord evicted her, because of fear and misinformation about the disease. Others who survived have similar stories: friends stop visiting, employers won't let workers return, communities believe that Ebola is a death sentence and that victims will eventually die so they shun survivors, children and adolescents are rejected by family members and fear inhibits other placement for them. The situation with children is especially troubling. More than 4,000 children are registered as orphans in Guinea. Because survivors appear to have an immunity to the disease, they are being recruited by UNICEF to help with children. Survivors are able to touch and provide comfort to the traumatized children in a way that personnel in protective gear cannot.

Tchecola is committed to raising awareness, educating about Ebola prevention, and fighting discrimination against survivors. She is a member of the Ebola Survivors Association of Guinea, which provides a support network for those who survived the disease.
