= Aziza Siddiqui =

Afghan activist

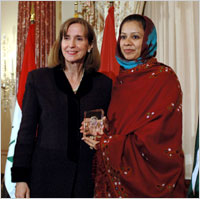
Aziza Siddiqui in 2007

Aziza Siddiqui (Pashto: عزيزه صديقي; born c. 1983) is an Afghan women's rights activist. She was the Women's Rights Coordinator with the Afghan NGO Action Aid, where she conducted research on the situation of rural Afghan women and educated them about their rights, as well as organized trainings on decision-making, despite being personally threatened for her work.

Born in Afghanistan, Siddiqui left for Pakistan when she was eight years old because of war, but returned to Afghanistan in 2003 to work for women's rights. In 2007 she received an International Women of Courage Award. However, being well known she was unable to safely return to Afghanistan after that, and so she obtained asylum in the United States.

In 2008, she began working as a case worker for BIAS, Bi-lingual International Assistant Services, which assists elderly and disabled immigrants, asylees, and refugees. In 2009 Siddiqui received the "Extraordinary Ordinary Person of the Year" Award from Gitana Productions, which promotes diversity through the arts and arts education.
