= Ana Rosario Contreras =

Venezuelan nurse and activist

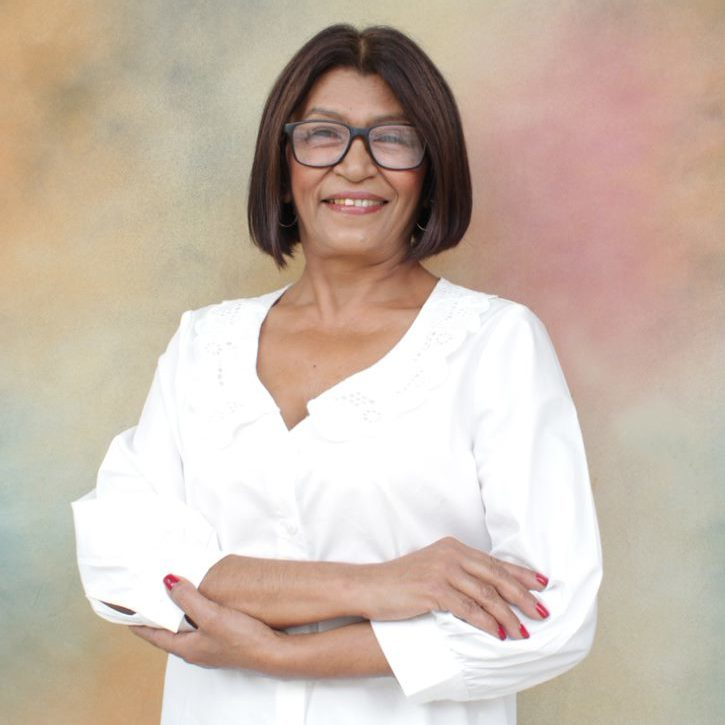
- in 2021
- Occupations: nurse and activist
- Known for: International Women of Courage Award in 2021.

Ana Rosario Contreras is a Venezuelan human rights activist and nurse. She is the president of the Caracas Nurses Association. Contreras stands up for human rights and the need for democracy. This is in contrast to the governments habit of jailing torturing and harassing opponents. She was awarded an International Women of Courage Award in 2021.
