= Sharmin Akter =

Bangladeshi activist

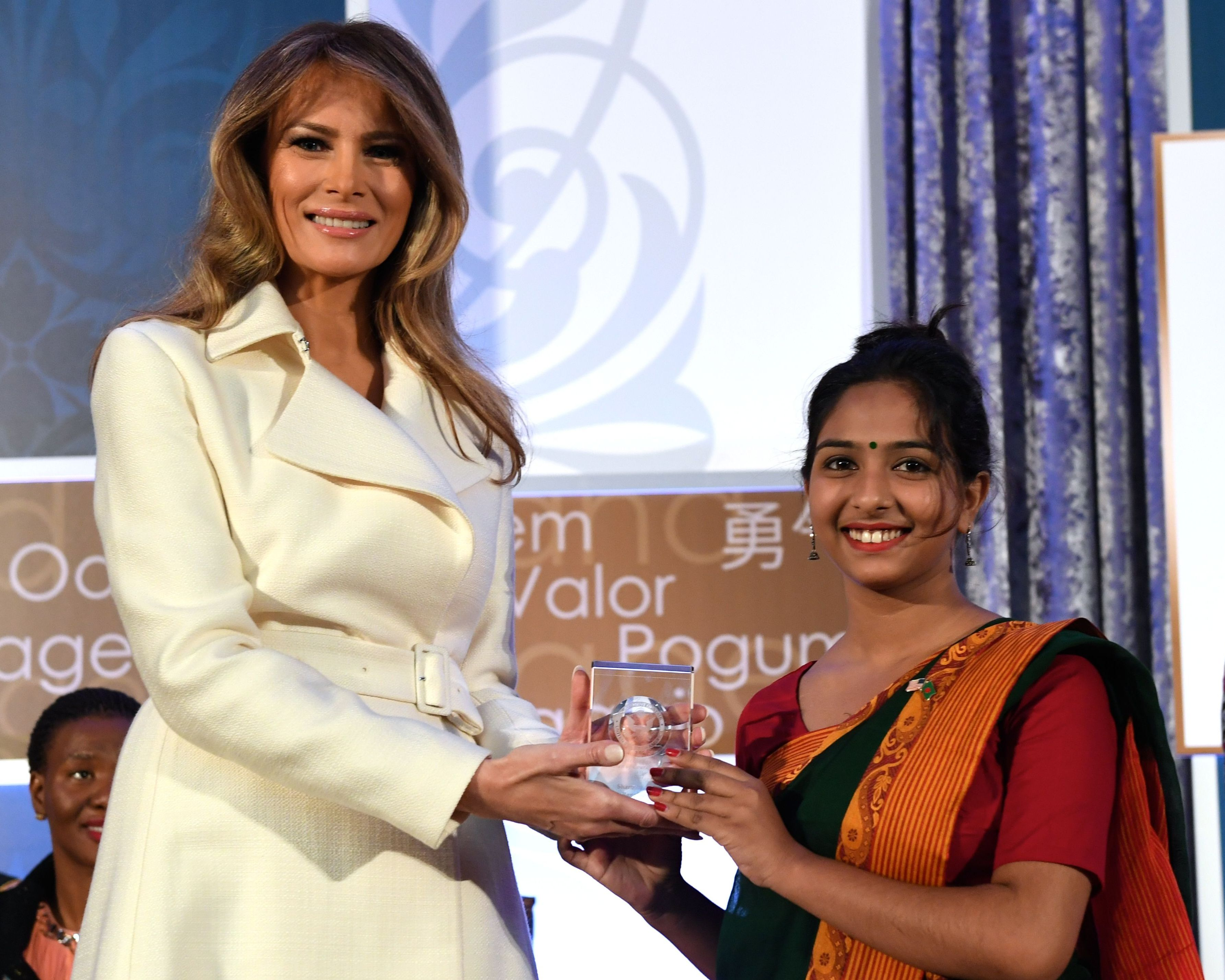
- Sharmin Akter with Melania Trump at the International Women of Courage Award 2017
- Known for: Human rights activist

Sharmin Akter is a Bangladeshi activist against child and forced marriages. She resisted her mother's efforts to get her married at the age of 15 to a 32-year-old man and fought to continue her education. A student of Rajapur Pilot Girls High School. She wants to become a lawyer to fight child and forced marriages. She is an International Women of Courage Award recipient.

Akter was praised in 2017 by her school's headteacher for successfully completing her exams despite the distractions.
