= Zabib Musa Loro Bakhit =

South Sudanese women's-rights and gender-equality activist

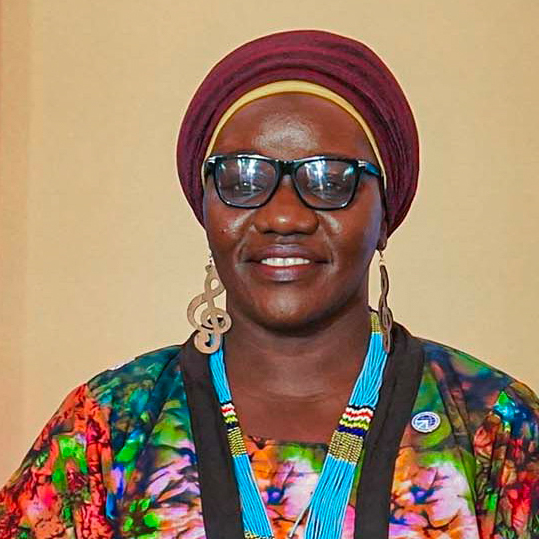
- Bakhit in 2025
- Born: South Sudan
- Citizenship: South Sudan
- Occupation: Women's rights activists
- Awards: International Women of Courage Award (2025)

Zabib Musa Loro Bakhit is a South Sudanese women's rights and gender equality activist, recognised for her extensive work in fragile, post-conflict settings. In 2025 she was awarded the International Women of Courage Award by the U.S. Department of State for her leadership, resilience, and commitment to advancing human rights, particularly for women, and her advocacy in policy, community programs, and gender-based initiatives.

== Early life and career ==
Bakhit has more than ten years of experience working in settings affected by conflict, fragility, and resource constraints.

She has held multiple leadership and representative roles at both national and regional levels. She has served as Chairperson of the Network of Aids Service Organizations in South Sudan (NASOSS), and as Chairperson of the East African National Network of Health Service Organizations (EANNASO).

She has also been a Regional Board Member for the Strategic Initiative in the Horn of Africa Network, a member of the Steering Committee of the NGO Forum, and convenor of the Women Human Rights Defenders Network.

Bakhit founded Women for Justice and Equality, a South Sudanese organization focused on grassroots implementation of Women, Peace, and Security programming, particularly in underserved communities. In that capacity she has been involved in community engagement, mentorship, development operations, policy advocacy, and oversight of research projects.

== Recognition ==
In 2025, the United States Department of State granted her the International Women of Courage Award, one of eight women globally to receive that year’s honour.

The award was conferred for her leadership in gender equality, sexual and reproductive health and rights (SRHR), transitional justice, and her ability to mobilize civic actors in challenging settings.
