= Jansila Majeed =

Activist in Sri Lanka's Puttalam District

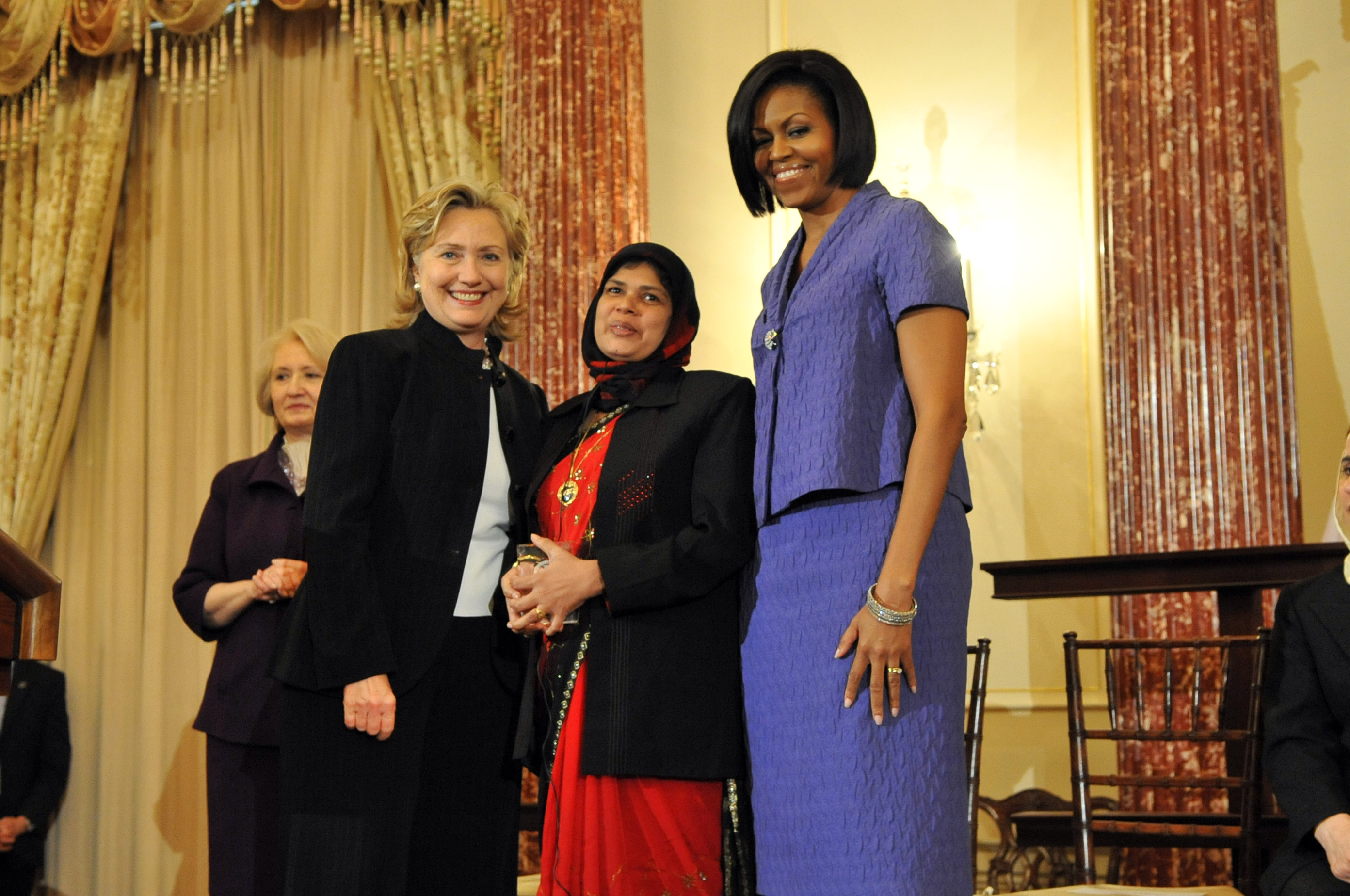
Jansila Majeed (center) with US Secretary of State Hillary Clinton (left) and US First Lady Michelle Obama (right)

Jansila Majeed is an activist in Sri Lanka's Puttalam District. She is the Managing Trustee of the Community Trust Fund in Puttalam, which is an NGO which promotes minority rights and women's rights.

Prior to her work with the Community Trust Fund, Majeed lived as an internally displaced person (IDP) for 20 years, and she continues to advocate for the rights of Muslim and Tamil IDPs.

In 2010, she was named an International Woman of Courage by the US Department of State, receiving her award from First Lady Michelle Obama and Secretary of State Hillary Clinton. She was also a speaker at the launch of the UNDP 2010 Asia-Pacific Human Development Report on Gender, and stated that Sri Lanka must change its attitude about women's rights in order to fix issues such as women’s political participation, access to legal rights and women’s participation in the workforce.
