= Henriette Da =

West African human rights defender

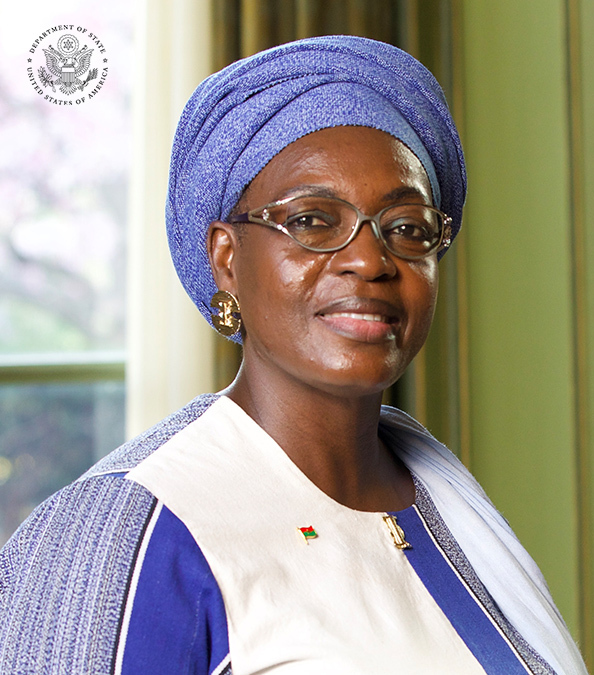
- Citizenship: Burkinabé
- Occupation: Human rights activist
- Awards: International Women of Courage Award (2025)

Henriette Da is a West African human rights defender from Burkina Faso, recognised for her leadership in human rights, women's rights, religious tolerance, and civic dialogue. In 2025, she received the International Women of Courage Award by the U.S. Department of State for her advocacy and activism in her country.

== Early life and education ==
Henriette Da is a trained sociologist and holds expertise in human rights, Women's rights, and development.

Early in her career, she worked as a socio-anthropological researcher in the health sector, where she carried out research and analysis related to public health and social determinants of wellbeing.

She also served as a public high school and college instructor in Burkina Faso, contributing to education and public awareness in her community.

== Career ==
Henriette Da is among the founding members of Burkina Faso's Association for Religious Tolerance and Inter-community Dialogue, an organization aimed to promoting peaceful coexistence among different faiths and communities.

She has also served as the president of civil society organizations, including The Association of Women Sociologists for Development, focusing on gender equality, women's rights, and sociological perspectives on development and civic life.

In 2018, she was appointed President of Burkina Faso's National Human Rights Commission, a position in which she has been noted for speaking out against abuses, promoting rights protections, and advocating for vulnerable communities.

Her leadership in this role has positioned her as one of the prominent human rights voices in Burkina Faso.

== Awards ==
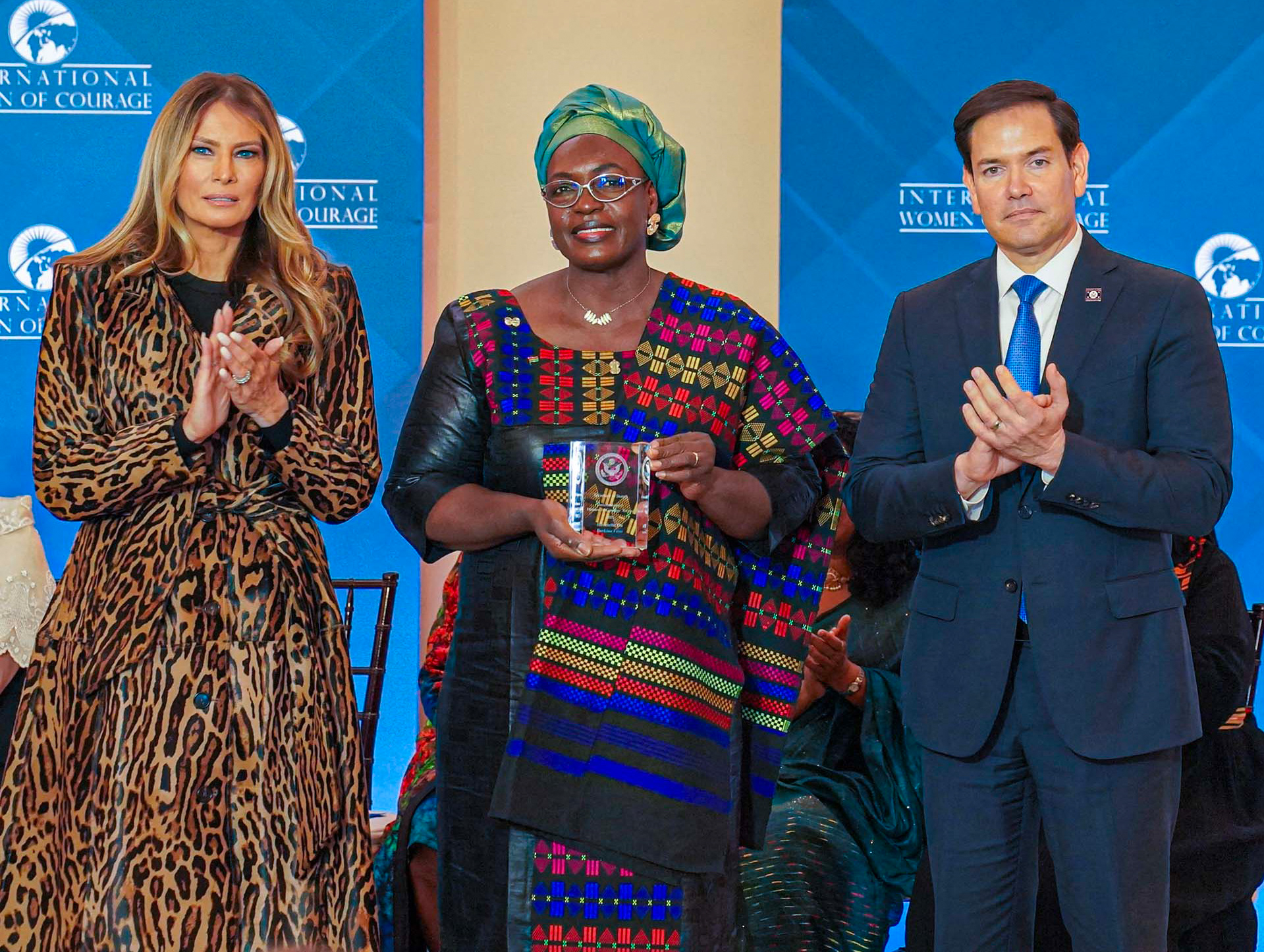
2025 International Women of Courage Award

In 2025, Henriette Da was awarded the International Women of Courage Award by the U.S. State Department. The award recognizes women who demonstrate exceptional courage, strength, and leadership, often at great personal risk.

At the time of the award, she was acknowledged for her work in human rights, religious tolerance, women's rights, and for her leadership in both civil society and governmental human rights institutions.
