= Khalida Khalaf Hanna al-Twal =

Jordanian police officer

- خالدة خلف حنا الطوال
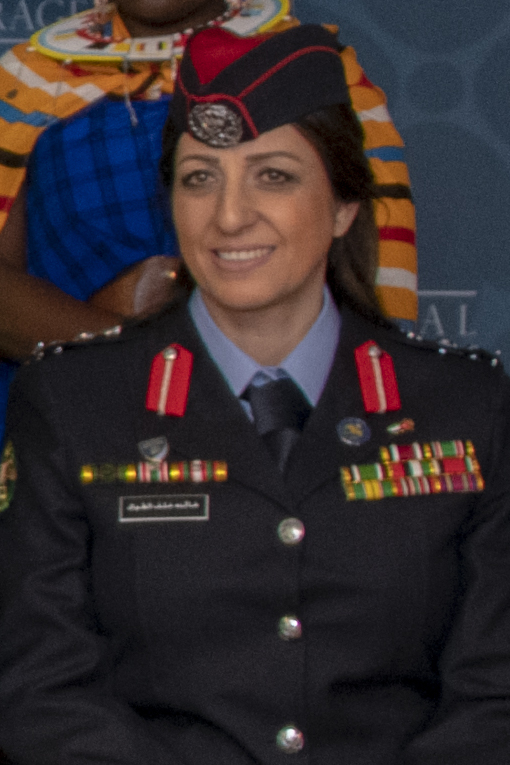
- Occupation: police officer
- Awards: 2019 International Women of Courage Award

Colonel Khalida Khalaf Hanna al-Twal (Arabic:خالدة خلف حنا الطوال) is a Jordanian police officer. She is currently serving as one of the prominent highest-ranking women in security services of Jordan.

She is the chief of the Public Security Directorate's (PSD) Women's Police Department. She is also a key member of the Jordan National Commission for Women (JNCW) and she is well known for her efforts in empowering women's rights and safety in Jordan. She joined the Directorate in 1991 and has worked as a volunteer in Refugee affairs and also served as a coordinator on Syrian rebel crisis. Previously, she served as news editor, program producer, writer and presenter for the Directorate.

She was presented the International Women of Courage Award on 8 March 2019, (an award which is presented to women for their remarkable achievements which often go unnoticed on the International Women's Day) by the United States Department of State and was nominated as one of the 10 recipients for the award.

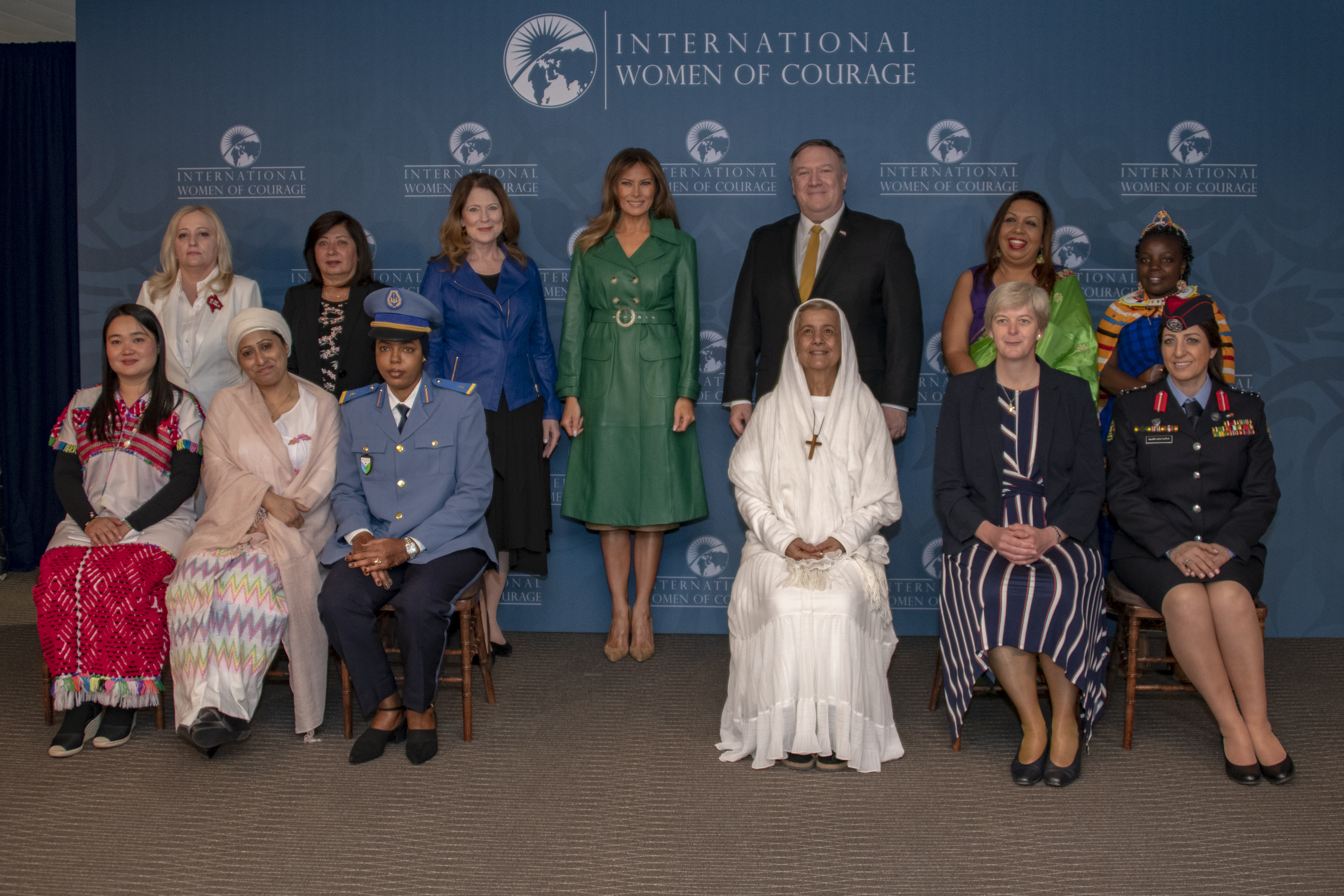
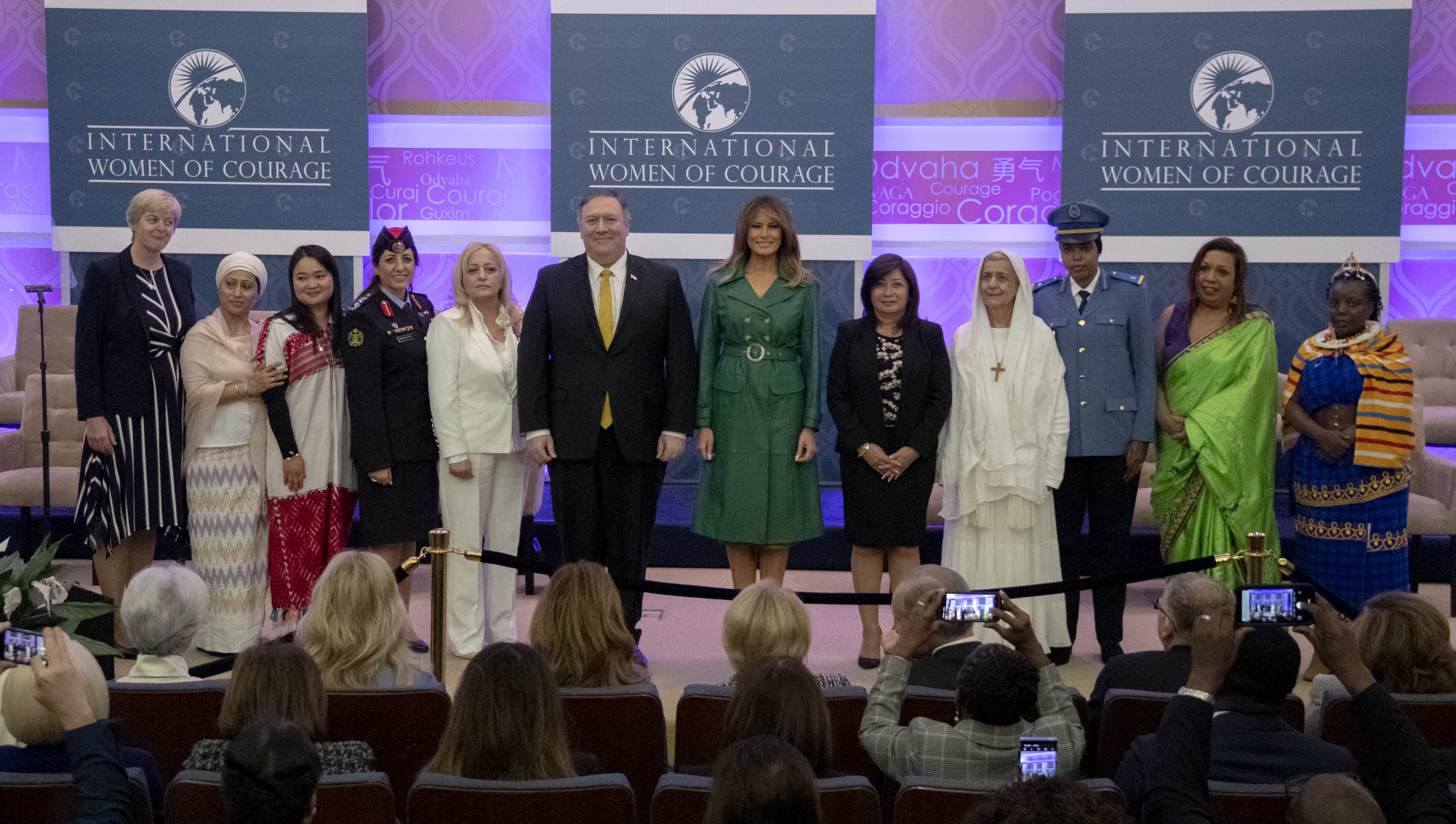
Khalida Khalaf Hanna al-Twal poses with other fellow recipients of the 2019 International Women of Courage Award
