= Shatha al-Abbousi =

Iraqi schoolteacher and women's rights activist

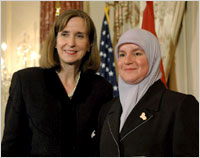
Shatha Abdul Razzak Abbousi in 2007

Shatha Abdul Razzak Abbousi (Arabic: شذى عبد الرزاق عبوسي) is an Iraqi women's rights activist.

As a member of the Iraqi Council of Representatives, and specifically a member of Iraq's Human Rights Committee, she has worked to pass human rights legislation. She joined The Pledge for Iraq, a women's rights activist group.

Abbousi taught biology and Islamic studies before leaving to participate in politics. Before the Iraq War of 2003, she was banned from teaching in any state schools due to refusing to join the Ba’ath Party, but after the war she was able to teach in a public school.

She received a 2007 International Women of Courage Award.
