= International Women of Courage Award =

Award to women for women's rights

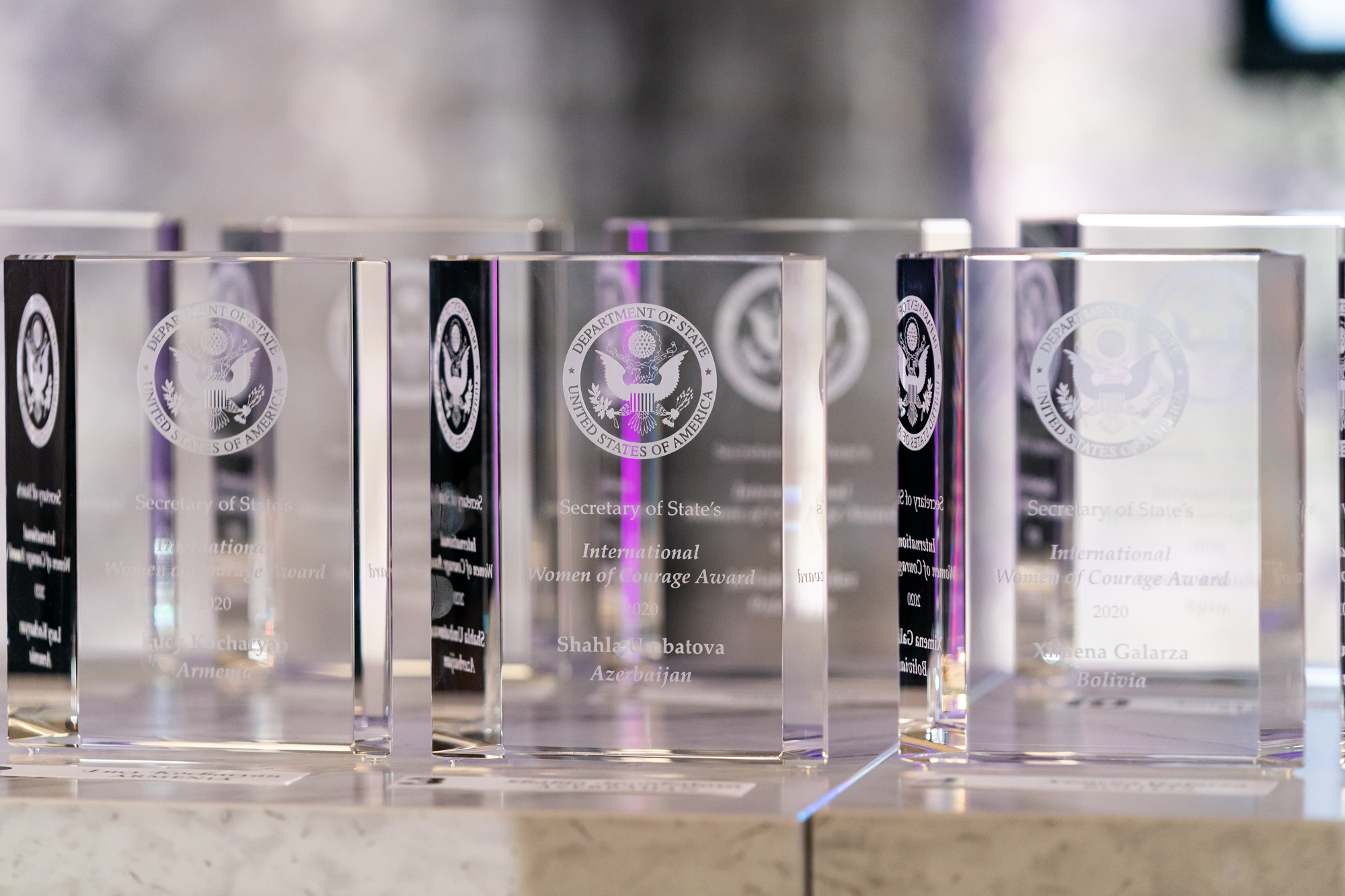
- Location: Washington, D.C.
- Country: United States
- Presented by: United States Department of State
- First award: Annually starting in 2007; 19 years ago
- Website: https://www.state.gov/secretary-of-states-international-women-of-courage-award/

The International Women of Courage Award, also referred to as the U.S. Secretary of State's International Women of Courage Award, is an American award presented annually by the United States Department of State to women around the world who have shown leadership, courage, resourcefulness, and willingness to sacrifice for others, especially in promoting women's rights.

== History ==
The award was established in 2007 by U.S. Secretary of State Condoleezza Rice on or near the International Women's Day, an annual celebration observed each March 8 in many countries worldwide. Each U.S. embassy has the right to recommend one woman as a candidate. As of 2021, the award has been given to over 155 recipients from about 75 different countries.

== Award recipients by year ==
=== 2007 ===
- Ruth Halperin-Kaddari of Israel
- Jennifer Louise Williams of Zimbabwe
- Siti Musdah Mulia of Indonesia
- Ilze Jaunalksne of Latvia
- Samia al-Amoudi of Saudi Arabia
- Mariya Ahmed Didi of the Maldives
- Susana Trimarco de Veron of Argentina
- Aziza Siddiqui of Afghanistan
- Sundus Abbas of Iraq
- Shatha Abdul Razzak Abbousi of Iraq
- Mary Akrami of Afghanistan
- Grace Padaca of the Philippines

=== 2008 ===
- Suraya Pakzad of Afghanistan
- Virisila Buadromo of Fiji
- Eaman al-Gobory of Iraq
- Valdete Idrizi of Kosovo
- Begum Jan of Pakistan
- Nibal Thawabteh of the Palestinian Authority
- Cynthia Bendlin of Paraguay
- Farhiyo Farah Ibrahim of Somalia

=== 2009 ===
- Mutabar Tadjibayeva of Uzbekistan
- Ambiga Sreenevasan of Malaysia
- Wazhma Frogh of Afghanistan
- Norma Cruz of Guatemala
- Suaad Allami of Iraq
- Hadizatou Mani of Niger
- Veronika Marchenko of Russia
- Reem Al Numery of Yemen

=== 2010 ===
- Shukria Asil of Afghanistan
- Shafiqa Quraishi of Afghanistan
- Androula Henriques of Cyprus
- Sonia Pierre of the Dominican Republic
- Shadi Sadr of Iran
- Ann Njogu of Kenya
- Lee Ae-ran of South Korea
- Jansila Majeed of Sri Lanka
- Marie Claude Naddaf of Syria
- Jestina Mukoko of Zimbabwe

Alice Mabota was given the award but she is not in the official list.

=== 2011 ===
- Maria Bashir of Afghanistan
- Henriette Ekwe Ebongo of Cameroon
- Guo Jianmei of China
- Eva Abu Halaweh of Jordan
- Marisela Morales Ibañez of Mexico
- Ágnes Osztolykán of Hungary
- Roza Otunbayeva of the Kyrgyz Republic
- Ghulam Sughra of Pakistan
- Yoani Sanchez of Cuba
- Nasta Palazhanka of Belarus
- Pionie Boso of the Solomon Islands

=== 2012 ===
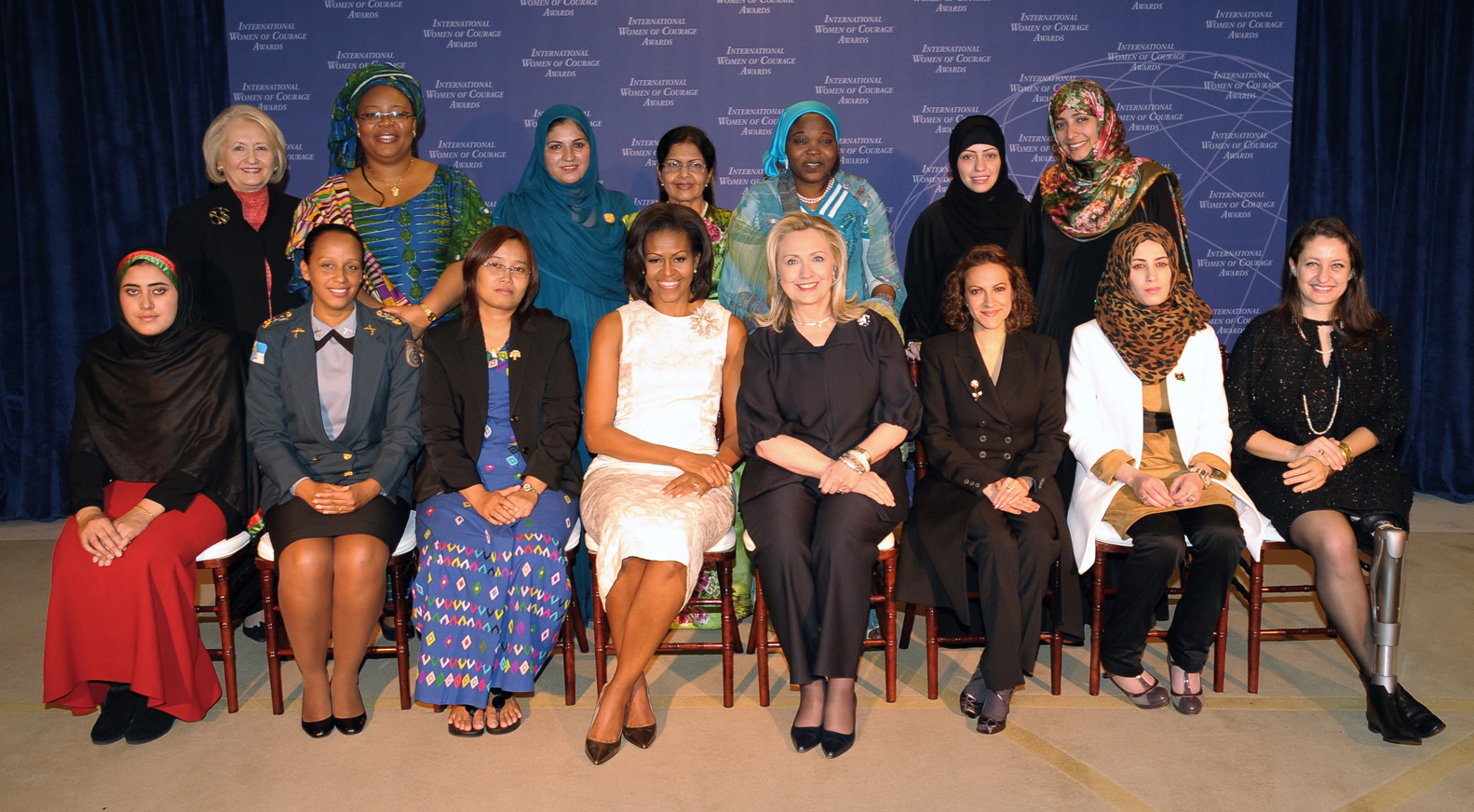
2012 International Women of Courage Awards, March 8, 2012. Back row, from left: Melanne Verveer (guest), Leymah Gbowee (guest), Shad Begum, Aneesa Ahmed, Hawa Abdallah Mohammed Salih, Samar Badawi, Tawakel Karman (guest). Front row, from left: Maryam Durani, Pricilla de Oliveira Azevedo, Zin Mar Aung, Michelle Obama, Hillary Clinton, Jineth Bedoya Lima, Hana Elhebshi, Şafak Pavey

- Aneesa Ahmed of the Maldives
- Zin Mar Aung of Burma
- Samar Badawi of Saudi Arabia
- Shad Begum of Pakistan
- Maryam Durani of Afghanistan
- Pricilla de Oliveira Azevedo of Brazil
- Hana Elhebshi of Libya
- Jineth Bedoya Lima of Colombia
- Şafak Pavey of Turkey
- Hawa Abdallah Mohammed Salih of Sudan
- Gabi Calleja of Malta

=== 2013 ===
- Malalai Bahaduri of Afghanistan
- Tsering Woeser of China
- Julieta Castellanos of Honduras
- Nirbhaya "Fearless" of India
- Josephine Obiajulu Odumakin of Nigeria
- Elena Milashina of Russia
- Fartuun Adan of Somalia
- Razan Zeitouneh of Syria
- Tạ Phong Tần of Vietnam

=== 2014 ===
- Nasrin Oryakhil of Afghanistan
- Roshika Deo of Fiji
- Rusudan Gotsiridze of Georgia
- Iris Yassmin Barrios Aguilar of Guatemala
- Laxmi of India
- Fatimata Touré of Mali
- Maha Al Muneef of Saudi Arabia
- Oinikhol Bobonazarova of Tajikistan
- Ruslana Lyzhychko of Ukraine
- Beatrice Mtetwa of Zimbabwe

=== 2015 ===
- Niloofar Rahmani of Afghanistan
- Nadia Sharmeen of Bangladesh
- Rosa Julieta Montaño Salvatierra of Bolivia
- May Sabe Phyu of Burma
- Emilie Béatrice Epaye of the Central African Republic
- Marie Claire Tchecola of Guinea
- Sayaka Osakabe of Japan
- Arbana Xharra of Kosovo
- Tabassum Adnan of Pakistan
- Majd Izzat al-Chourbaji of Syria

=== 2016 ===
- Sara Hossain of Bangladesh
- Debra Baptist-Estrada of Belize
- Ni Yulan of China
- Latifa Ibn Ziaten of France
- Thelma Aldana of Guatemala
- Nagham Nawzat of Iraq
- Nisha Ayub of Malaysia
- Fatimata M’baye of Mauritania
- Zhanna Nemtsova of Russia
- Zuzana Števulová of Slovakia
- Awadeya Mahmoud of Sudan
- Vicky Ntetema of Tanzania
- Rodjaraeg Wattanapanit of Thailand
- Nihal Naj Ali Al-Awlaqi of Yemen

=== 2017 ===
2017 awards were awarded to:

- Sharmin Akter, activist on early/forced marriage, Bangladesh
- Malebogo Molefhe, human rights activist, Botswana
- Natalia Ponce de Leon, president of the Natalia Ponce de Leon Foundation, Colombia
- Rebecca Kabugho, political and social activist, Democratic Republic of Congo
- Jannat Al Ghezi, deputy director of the Organization of Women's Freedom in Iraq
- Major Aichatou Ousmane Issaka, deputy director of social work at the Military Hospital of Niamey, Niger
- Veronica Simogun, founder and director of the Family for Change Association, Papua New Guinea
- Cindy Arlette Contreras Bautista, lawyer and icon of Not One Woman Less, Peru
- Sandya Eknelygoda, human rights activist, Sri Lanka
- Sister Carolin Tahhan Fachakh, nun and member of the Daughters of Mary Help of Christians (F.M.A.), Syria
- Saadet Ozkan, educator and gender activist, Turkey
- Nguyễn Ngọc Như Quỳnh (Mother Mushroom), blogger and environmental activist, Vietnam
- Fadia Najeeb Thabet, human rights activist, Yemen

=== 2018 ===
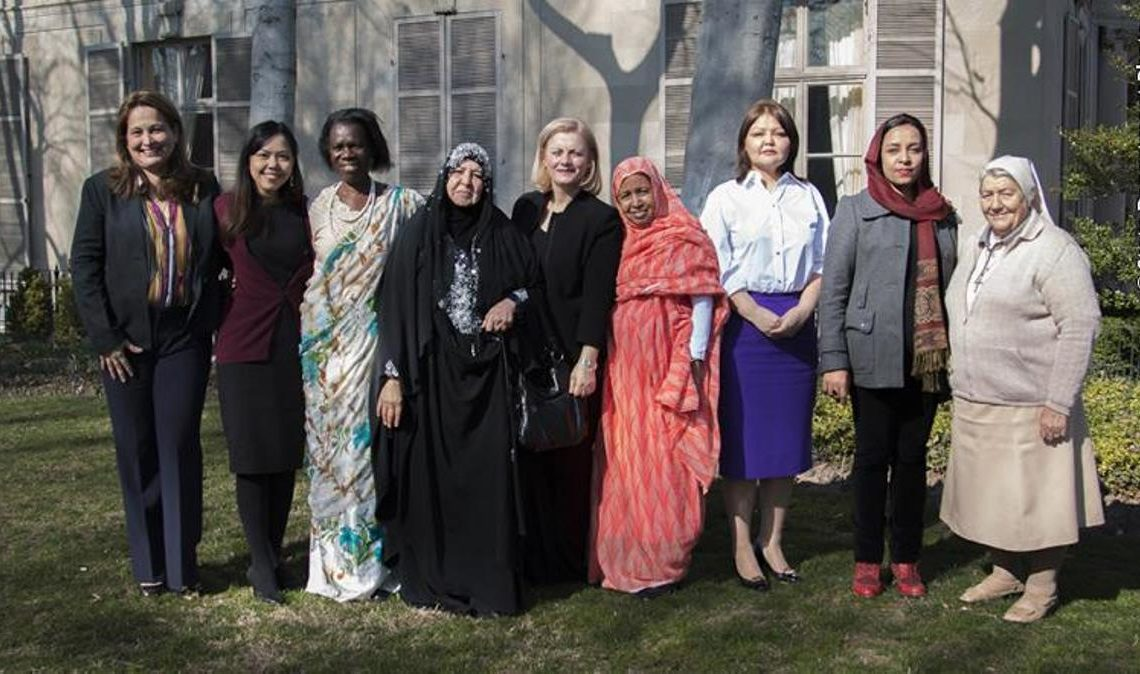
(nine of the ten) 2018 International Women of Courage Awardees. 1.Julissa Villanueva 2.Sirikan Charoensiri 3.Godelive Mukasarasi, 4. Aliyah Khalaf Saleh, 5. Feride Rushiti, 6. L’Malouma Said, 7. Aiman Umarova, 8 Roya Sadat, 9.Maria Elena Berini

2018 awards were awarded to:

- Roya Sadat of Afghanistan
- Aura Elena Farfan of Guatemala
- Dr. Julissa Villanueva of Honduras
- Aliyah Khalaf Saleh of Iraq
- Sister Maria Elena Berini of Italy (nominated by the U.S. Embassy to the Holy See)
- Aiman Umarova of Kazakhstan
- Dr. Feride Rushiti of Kosovo
- L’Malouma Said of Mauritania
- Godeliève Mukasarasi of Rwanda
- Sirikan Charoensiri of Thailand

=== 2019 ===
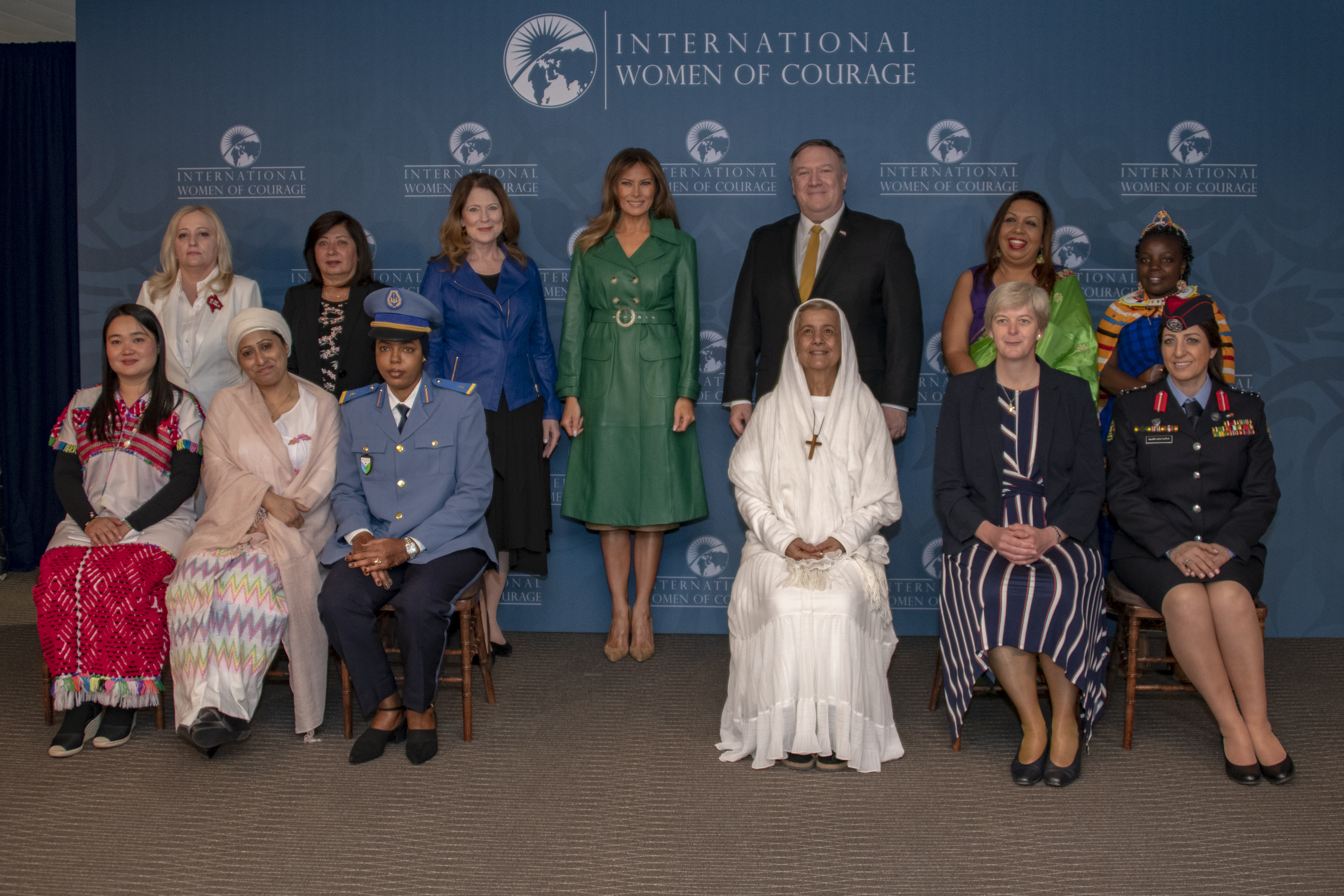
2019 International Women of Courage Awardees.

2019 awards were awarded to:

- Marini De Livera of Sri Lanka
- Razia Sultana (Bangladesh)
- Naw K’nyaw Paw (Myanmar)
- Moumina Houssein Darar (Djibouti)
- Maggie Gobran (Egypt)
- Khalida Khalaf Hanna al-Twal (Jordan)
- Orla Treacy (Republic of Ireland)
- Olivera Lakić (Montenegro)
- Flor de María Vega Zapata (Peru)
- Anna Aloys Henga (Tanzania)

Note: According to Foreign Policy magazine, an intended award for Jessikka Aro (Finland), announced in January 2019, was withdrawn shortly before the ceremony in March 2019.

=== 2020 ===
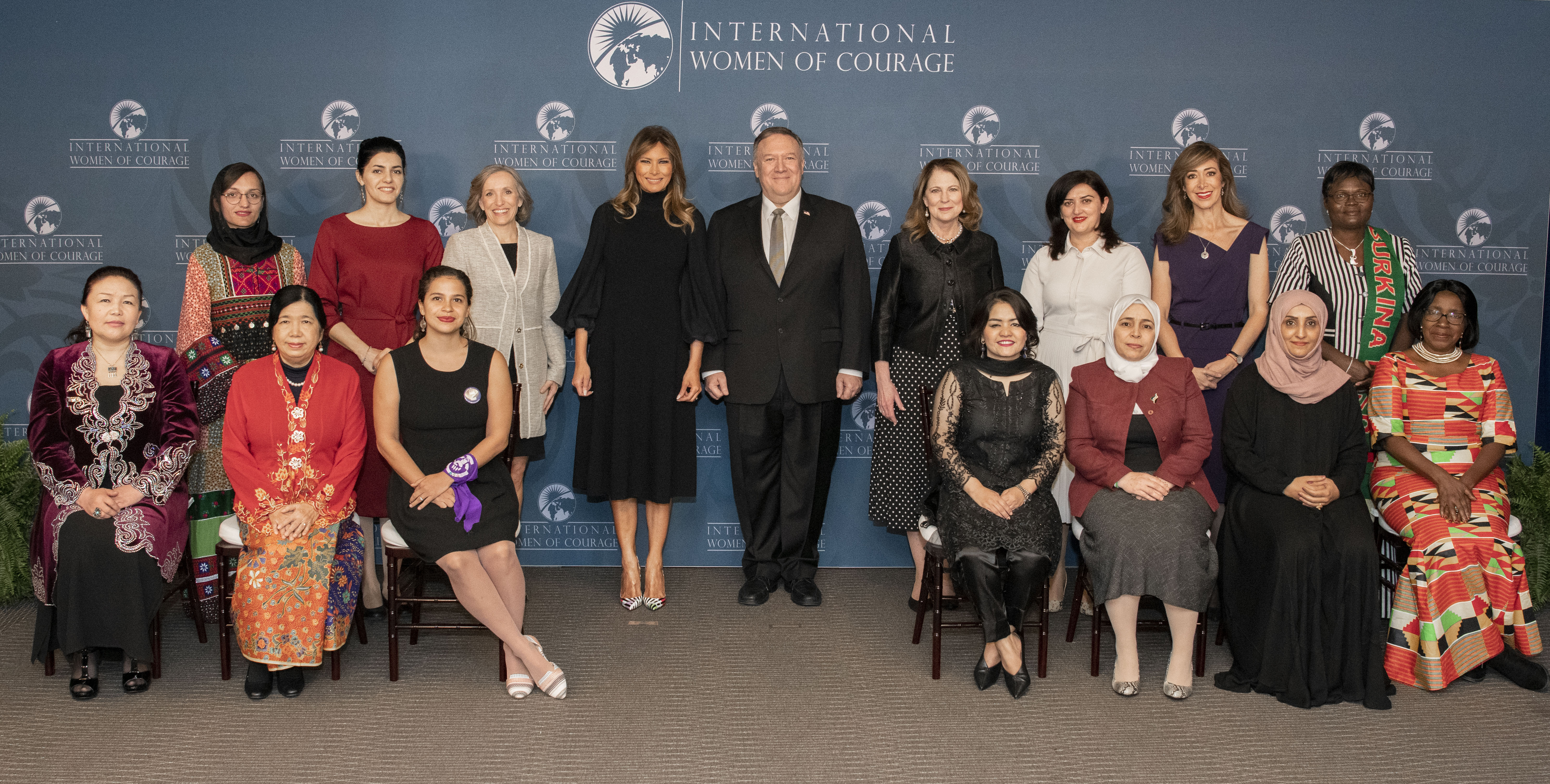
In the back row. left to right. 1. Zarifa Ghafari, 2. Lucy Kocharyan, 3. Kelley Eckels Currie, 4. Melania Trump, 5. Mike Pompeo, 6. Marie Royce,7. Shahla Humbatova, 8.Ximena Galarza, 9. Claire Ouedraogo of Burkina Faso. In the front row: 1. Sayragul Sauytbay, 2. Susanna Liew, 3. Amaya Coppens, 4. Jalilah Haider, 5. Amina Khoulani, 6. Yasmin al Qadhi, 7.Rita Nyampinga.

2020 awards were awarded to:

- Zarifa Ghafari (Afghanistan)
- Lucy Kocharyan (Armenia)
- Shahla Humbatova (Azerbaijan)
- Ximena Galarza (Bolivia)
- Claire Ouedraogo (Burkina Faso)
- Sayragul Sauytbay (China)
- Susanna Liew (Malaysia)
- Amaya Coppens (Nicaragua)
- Jalila Haider (Pakistan)
- Amina Khoulani (Syria)
- Yasmin al Qadhi (Yemen)
- Rita Nyampinga (Zimbabwe)

=== 2021 ===
2021 awards were awarded to:

- Maria Kalesnikava (Belarus)
- Phyoe Phyoe Aung (Burma) (sic)
- Maximilienne C. Ngo Mbe (Cameroon)
- Wang Yu (China)
- Mayerlis Angarita (Colombia)
- Julienne Lusenge (DRC)
- Erika Aifan (Guatemala)
- Shohreh Bayat (Iran)
- Muskan Khatun (Nepal)
- Zahra Mohamed Ahmad (Somalia)
- Alicia Vacas Moro (Spain)
- Ranitha Gnanarajah (Sri Lanka)
- Canan Gullu (Turkey)
- Ana Rosario Contreras (Venezuela)

=== 2022 ===
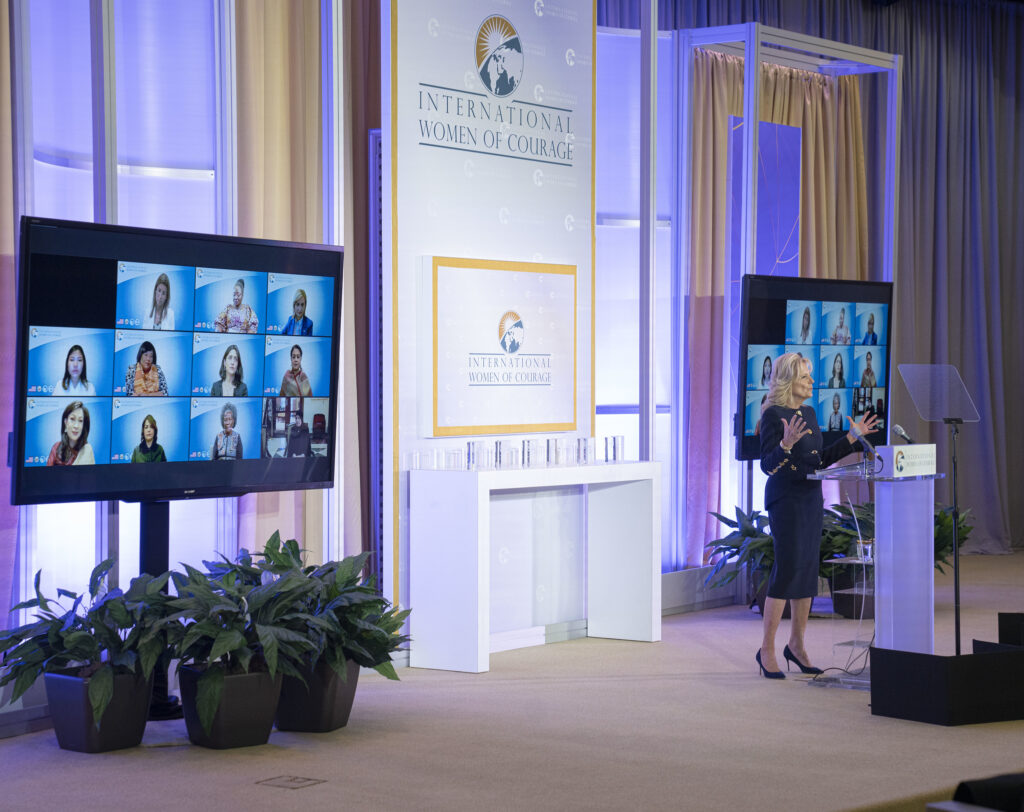
The 2022 (virtual) International Women of Courage hosted by Jill Biden

2022 awards were awarded to:

- Rizwana Hasan (Bangladesh)
- Simone Sibilio do Nascimento (Brazil)
- Ei Thinzar Maung (Burma)
- Josefina Klinger Zúñiga (Colombia)
- Taif Sami Mohammed (Iraq)
- Facia Boyenoh Harris (Liberia)
- Najla Mangoush (Libya)
- Doina Gherman (Moldova)
- Bhumika Shrestha (Nepal)
- Carmen Gheorghe (Romania)
- Roegchanda Pascoe (South Africa)
- Phạm Đoan Trang (Vietnam)

=== 2023 ===
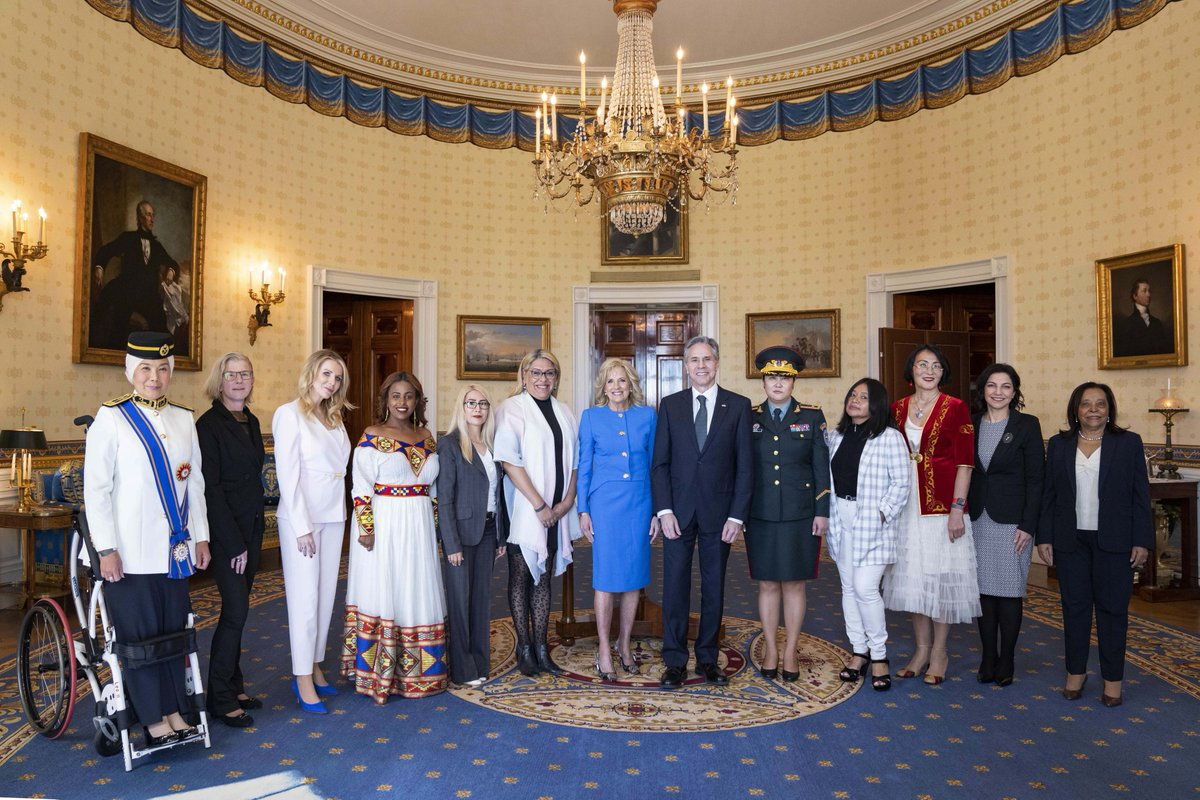
17th annual International Women of Courage Award Ceremony in the East Room of the White House, March 2023

The 2023 awards were given to:

- Zakira Hekmat (Afghanistan)
- Alba Rueda (Argentina)
- Danièle Darlan (Central African Republic)
- Doris Ríos (Costa Rica)
- Meaza Mohammed (Ethiopia)
- Hadeel Abdel Aziz (Jordan)
- Bakhytzhan Toregozhina (Kazakhstan)
- Ras Adiba Radzi (Malaysia)
- Bolor Ganbold (Mongolia)
- Bianka Zalewska (Poland)
- Yuliia Paievska (Ukraine)

==== Additional Honorary Group ====
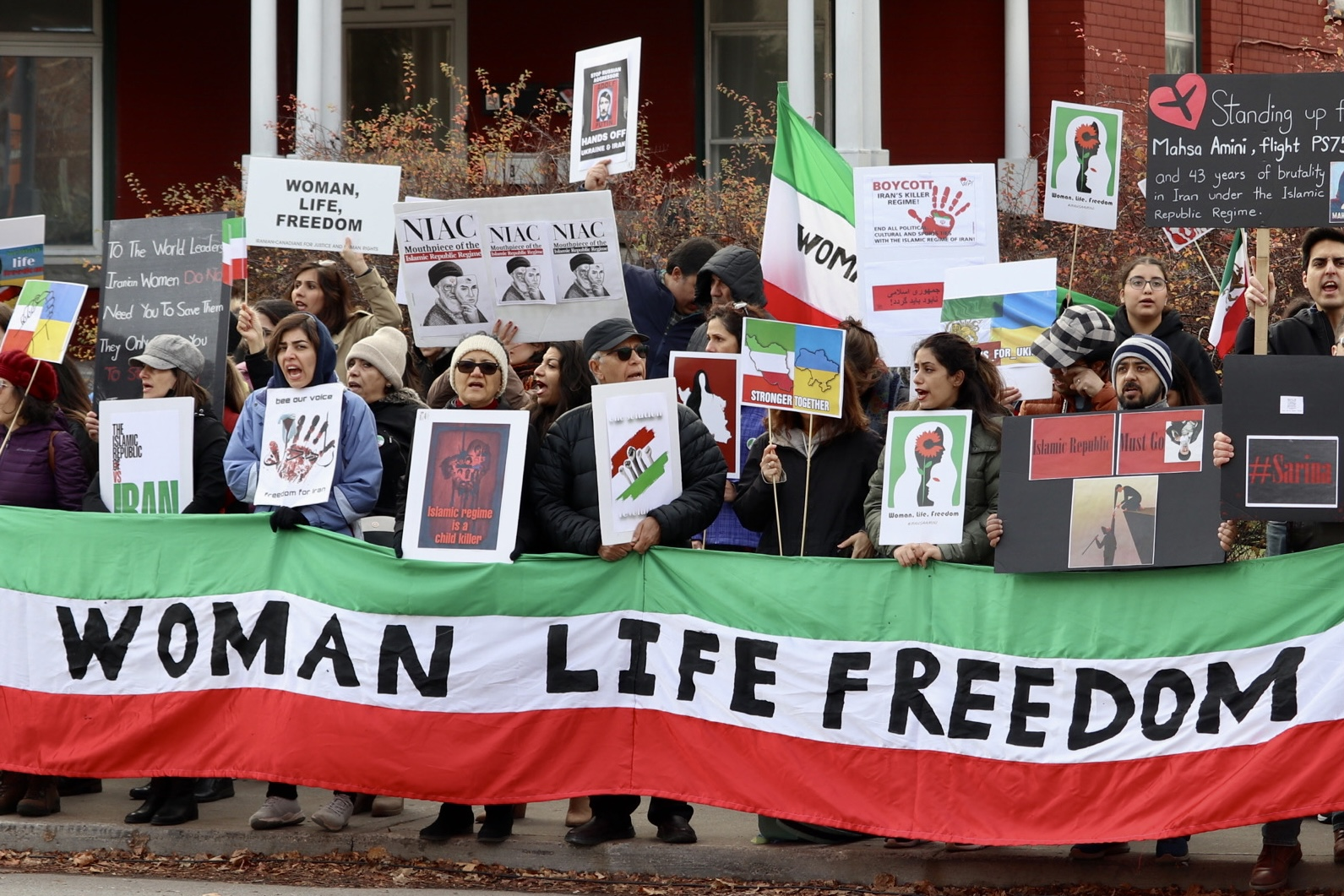
A sign with the slogan on it in Central and Northern Kurdish as well as English

- (Jordan) Hadeel Abdel Aziz
- (Central African Republic) Professor Danièle Darlan
- (Mongolia) Brigadier General Bolor Ganbold
- (Afghanistan) Dr. Zakira Hekmat
- (Ethiopia) Meaza Mohammed
- (Ukraine) Yuliia Paievska
- (Malaysia) Senator Datuk Ras Adiba Radzi
- (Costa Rica) Doris Ríos
- (Argentina) Alba Rueda
- (Kazakhstan) Bakhytzhan Toregozhina
- (Poland) Bianka Zalewska

An additional Honorary Group Award was given to the "women and girl protestors of Iran" in response to the death of Mahsa Amini and the ongoing protests against the government.

=== 2024 ===
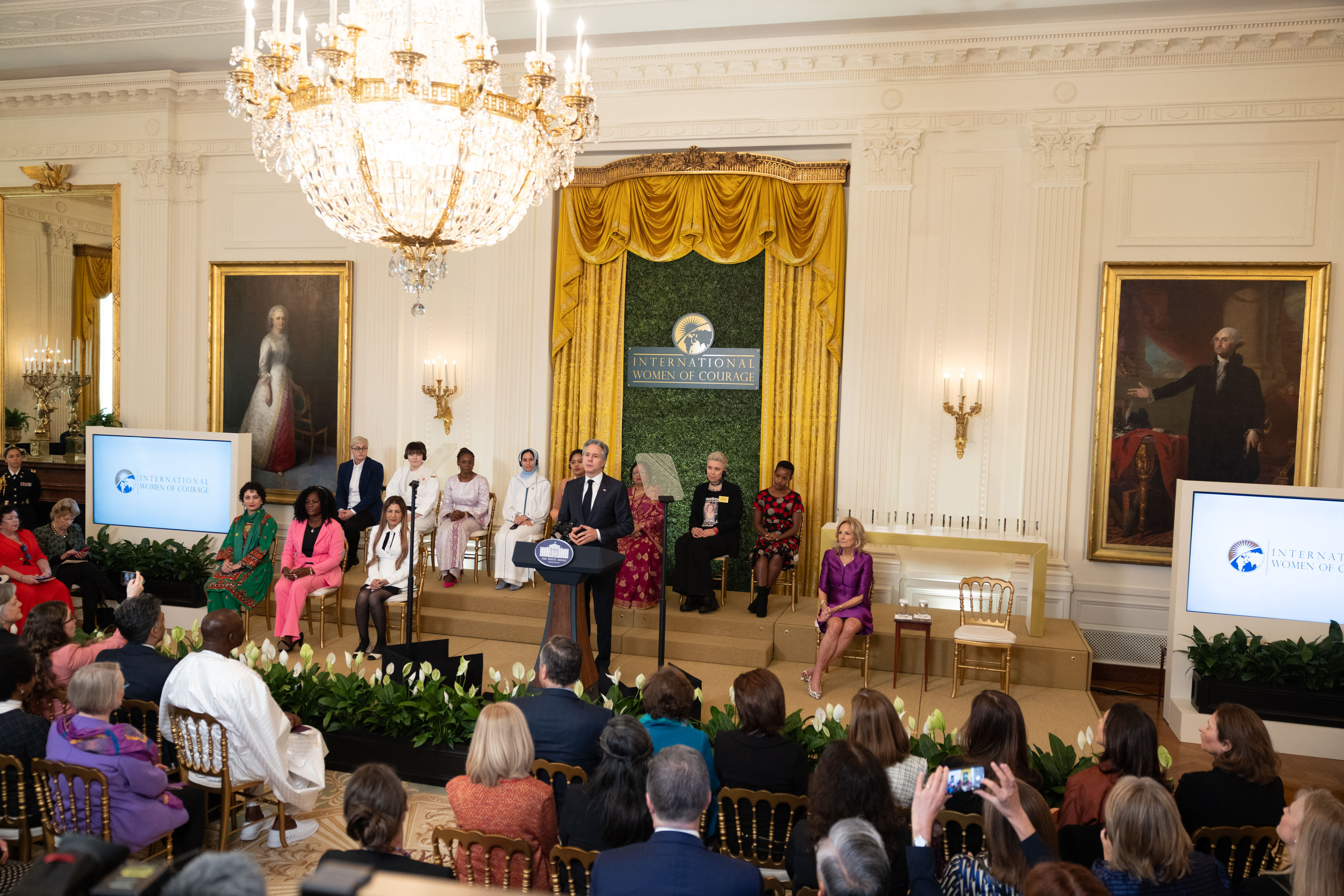
Awardees: (Back row) Ajna Jusić, Rina Gonoi, Fatou Baldeh, Rabha El Haymar, Benafsha Yaqoobi, Fawzia Karim Firoze, Volha Harbunova, Agather Atuhaire. Front row: Fariba Balouch, Fátima Corozo, Benafsha Yaqoobi

The 2024 awards were given to:

- Benafsha Yaqoobi (Afghanistan)
- Fawzia Karim Firoze (Bangladesh)
- Volha Harbunova (Belarus)
- Ajna Jusić (Bosnia and Herzegovina)
- Myintzu Win (Burma)
- Marta Beatriz Roque (Cuba)
- Fátima Corozo (Ecuador)
- Fatou Baldeh (The Gambia)
- Fariba Balouch (Iran)
- Rina Gonoi (Japan)
- Rabha El Haymar (Morocco)
- Agather Atuhaire (Uganda)

=== 2025 ===
The 2025 awards were given to:

- Henriette Da (Burkina Faso)
- Amit Soussana (Israel)
- Major Velena Iga (Papua New Guinea)
- Angelique Songco (Philippines)
- Georgiana Pascu (Romania)
- Zabib Musa Loro Bakhit (South Sudan)
- Namini Wijedasa (Sri Lanka)
- Amat Al-Salam Al-Hajj (Yemen)
- Women Student Protest Leaders of Bangladesh in the July Revolution

An additional Honorary Group Award was given to the "Women Student Protest Leaders of Bangladesh" in response to the July Revolution in Bangladesh against the former government.

== See also ==
- List of awards honoring women
