= Ranitha Gnanarajah =

Sri Lankan lawyer and human rights activist

- ரனிதா ஞானராஜா
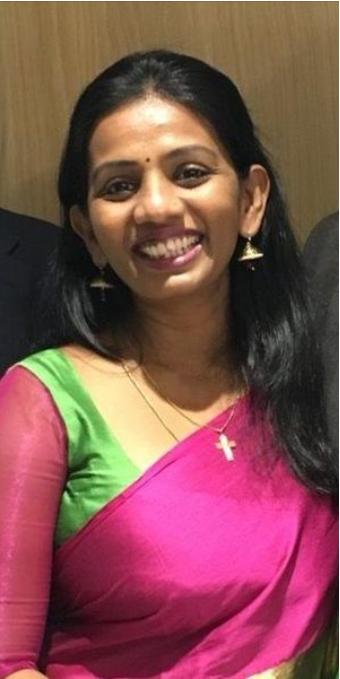
- Occupations: lawyer, human rights activist
- Awards: 2021 International Women of Courage Award

Ranitha Gnanarajah (Tamil: ரனிதா ஞானராஜா) is a Tamil Sri Lankan human rights activist and lawyer. She has been widely praised for her efforts in advocating for the rights of victims of enforced disappearances and those detained under the Prevention of Terrorism Act. Ranitha has been known to have provided free legal assistance to prisoners detained without charge. She received the prestigious International Women of Courage Award in 2021 coinciding with the International Women's Day during a virtual event conducted by the United States Secretary of State.

Gnanarajah also served as the Head of the Legal Department of the Centre (CHRD). She pursued her career as a lawyer in 2006 at the Home for Human Rights. She has also done research on domestic violence and highlighted the loopholes and deficiencies at the police stations in Sri Lanka. Her research indicated that the majority of the cases which were filed by women who attempted to seek self protection from harassment had been impeded. She has also been conducting social awareness campaigns which influenced increased access to women's shelters and counselling services.
