= Eaman al-Gobory =

Iraqi medical officer

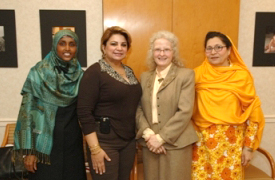
Eaman Al-Gobory (second person from the left) in 2008

Eaman al-Gobory (Arabic: إيمان الجبوري) is the National Medical Officer for the International Organization for Migration, an international aid organization in Iraq.

She graduated from medical school in Baghdad, Iraq, but did not want to join the Baath Party of Saddam Hussein, and so left Iraq to work in Yemen. In 2003 she returned to Iraq after the Iraq War of 2003 began, and worked in an emergency room. Later in 2003 she began working for the International Organization for Migration, which arranges for people to receive medical treatment in hospitals located in 19 countries. Eaman focuses on treating Iraqi children, searching for those who need specialized care and arranging for them to receive it, as well as working to improve medical care in Iraq.

She received a 2008 International Women of Courage Award.
