= Jacqueline Musiitwa =

Ugandan lawyer

- Born: Jacqueline Musiitwa; 1979 (age 46–47); Uganda
- Education: Davidson College (BA); University of Melbourne (JD); Australian National University (Diploma in Legal Practice)
- Occupations: Lawyer; academic
- Years active: 2010–present

Jacqueline Muna Musiitwa is an international lawyer and expert in African commercial affairs, who served as the executive director of Financial Sector Deepening Uganda, a Ugandan non-profit that aims to facilitate the availability of affordable financial services to a wider and more inclusive segment of Uganda's population. She was appointed to that position in June 2017. She left FSD Uganda in February 2019.

== Education ==
Musiitwa received her first degree, a Bachelor of Arts in Political Science and International Studies, from Davidson College, in Davidson, North Carolina, United States, graduating in 2003.

She transferred to the University of Melbourne, in Melbourne, Australia, graduating from there with a Juris Doctor degree in 2006. She also obtained a Diploma in Legal Practice, obtained from the Australian National University, in Canberra.

She also received executive legal and business training from (a) The Hague Academy of International Law (Certificate in Private International Law, in 2009), (b) Oxford Said Business School (The Archbishop Tutu Leadership Fellowship Programme, in 2011) and (c) Harvard Kennedy School of Government (Executive Education in Public Policy Analysis, in 2012).

== Career ==
Jacqueline Musiitwa in the founder and managing partner of the Hoja Law Group, with offices in New York City and Kigali, founded in 2008.

She has served in the past, for a period of nearly two years, as the legal adviser to the president of the Trade and Development Bank, based in Nairobi, Kenya. For nearly two years before that, she served as an advisor to the director general of the World Trade Organization on matters of trade, economic integration and global governance.

From September 2010 until November 2011, Musiitwa served as advisor to the Rwanda Ministry of Justice and Rwanda's Attorney General's Office, on matters related to trade and investment.

== Other considerations ==
She has served in the past as an adjunct professor of law at the National University of Rwanda. She is a member of the Monetary Policy Advisory Committee of the Board of Bank of Zambia. She is also a board member of Crisis Action, an international non-profit aimed at protecting civilians from armed conflict. Ms Musiitwa is expert in African commercial affairs.

== See also ==
- Sylvia Tamale
- Barbara Ntambirweki
- Zahara Nampewo
- Stella Nansikombi Makubuya
