= Joe Oloka-Onyango =

Ugandan lawyer and academic

Professor Joe Oloka-Onyango
- Born: Joseph Andrew Oloka-Onyango; 16 September 1960 (age 66); London
- Occupations: Lawyer and academic
- Known for: Lawyer, Legal Scholar, Author, Human Rights and Social Justice Activist.
- Title: Professor
- Spouse: Sylvia Tamale
- Children: 2

Academic background
- Education: Harvard Law School (J.S.D; LL.M) Law Development Centre (Dip. L.P) Makerere University (LL.B)

Academic work
- Discipline: Constitutional law, Human rights, Refugee Law
- Main interests: Constitutionalism, Political governance, Human rights
- Notable works: When Courts Do Politics (Cornell University, 2016), Battling over Human Rights: Twenty Essays on Law, Politics and Governance (Langaa Publishing, 2015), Constitutionalism in Africa; Creating Opportunities, Facing Challenges (Fountain Publishers, 2001), Ghosts & the Law

Joe Oloka-Onyango is a Ugandan lawyer and academic. He is a Professor of Law at Makerere University School of Law where he has also formerly been Dean and Director of the Human Rights and Peace Centre (HURIPEC). He is married to Prof Sylvia Tamale, also a lawyer, academic and activist. They have two sons; Kwame Sobukwe Ayepa and Samora Okech Sanga.

== Early life ==
Oloka-Onyango studied Law at Makerere University and attained his post-graduate Diploma in Legal Practice (bar course award) from the Law Development Center in Kampala, before earning his Master of Laws and Doctor of Juridical Science degrees at Harvard Law School. He is a scholar of Constitutionalism and human rights in the African context.

== Career ==
Prof Oloka-Onyango previously served as a member of the UN Sub-Commission on the Promotion and Protection of Human Rights, as UN Special Rapporteur on Globalization and Human Rights, as well as consultant to the United Nations Development Programme, United Nations High Commissioner for Refugees and the World Health Organization. He also serves on the advisory or governing boards of non-profit human rights organizations in North America, Europe and Africa.

He has been a visiting professor at various universities around the world, including Oxford, Cape Town and the United Nations University in Tokyo. In 2014–2015, he spent his sabbatical as Fulbright Professor at George Washington University (GWU) in the USA and Fellow at the Stellenbosch Institute of Advanced Studies (STIAS) in South Africa.

Prof Oloka-Onyango's Professorial Inaugural Lecture, entitled Ghosts & the Law, contained a detailed analysis of the origins, manifestations and intricacies of the Political Question Doctrine in Uganda and its closely related co-concept of Public Interest Litigation and together, their impact on Constitutionalism, the Doctrine of Separation of Powers, enforcement of fundamental Human rights, judicial independence, the phenomenon of "Presidentialism" and other aspects of modern state life. Within this lecture, he also extensively reviewed the historic precedent in Uganda v Commissioner of Prisons, Ex Parte Matovu and its effects on Ugandan jurisprudence to-date.

On May 5, 2016, he took lead when he made the inaugural staff lecture at the Makerere University School of Law, presenting a paper entitled "Enter the Dragon, Exit a Myth: The Contested Candidacy of John Patrick Amama Mbabazi".

On May 9, 2016, Prof Oloka-Onyango and 8 other law dons from Makerere University School of Law successfully filed an application before the Supreme Court of Uganda for leave to intervene in Uganda's 2017 Presidential election petition, Amama Mbabazi v. Yoweri Museveni & the Electoral Commission, as Amici Curiae. This became the first time in Ugandan electoral history that the Supreme Court heard and granted an application for such leave. The nine law dons were; Oloka-Onyango, Sylvia Tamale, Christopher Mbazira, Ronald Naluwairo, Rose Nakayi, Busingye Kabumba, Daniel Ruhwheza, Kakungulu Mayambala and Daniel Ngabirano. As part of their submission, the law dons recommended to the Court the use of structural interdicts or supervisory injunctions to deal with the persistent disregard of its recommendations by the Electoral Commission and the State in matters of the electoral process. In its ruling, the Court stated that;

"We are satisfied that the applicants have proven record in the area of Human Rights, Constitutionalism and Good Governance. They are highly experienced and widely researched legal scholars in these and related matters as evidenced by the attached curricula vitae."

== Cases ==
Prof Oloka-Onyango is an active litigant and has been involved in various cases of Constitutional importance and relevance to the Human rights field. He was the lead petitioner in Constitutional Petition No. 8 of 2014, "Oloka-Onyango & 9 Others v. the Attorney General", before the Constitutional Court wherein the Anti Homosexuality Act of 2014 was declared void. He was also one of the petitioners in Constitutional Petition No. 2 of 2003, "Uganda Association of Women Lawyers & 5 Others v. the Attorney General" which successfully challenged the Constitutional validity of several provisions of Uganda's Divorce Act for being contrary to the Constitutionally guaranteed rights to equality of all persons regardless of sex and the rights of women.

== Works ==
Some of Prof Oloka-Onyango's works include:

- Politics, Democratization and Academia in Uganda: The Case of Makerere University (Daraja Press, 2021)
- An Overview of the Legal System in Uganda
- The National Resistance Movement,“Grassroots Democracy”, and Dictatorship in Uganda
- Controlling Consent: Uganda's 2016 Elections – Edited by J. Oloka-Onyango and Josephine Ahikire (2016)
- "When Courts Do Politics" (Cornell University, 2016)
- "Enter the Dragon, Exit a Myth: The Contested Candidacy of John Patrick Amama Mbabazi" (2016)
- "From Expulsion to Exclusion" (2016)
- "Befriending the Judiciary: Behind and Beyond the 2016 Supreme Court Amicus Curiae Rulings in Uganda" – J Oloka-Onyango and Christopher Mbazira (2016)
- "Battling over Human Rights: Twenty Essays on Law, Politics and Governance" (Langaa Publishing, 2015)
- "Debating Love, Politics and Identity in East Africa: The Case of Kenya and Uganda" in the African Journal of Human Rights (2015)
- "Human Rights and Public Interest Litigation in East Africa: A Bird's Eye View" in the George Washington University International Law Review (2015)
- "Unpacking the African Backlash to The International Criminal Court (ICC): The Case of Uganda and Kenya" (2015)
- "Police Powers, Politics and Democratic Governance in Post-Movement Uganda (2011)
- Beyond the rhetoric: reinvigorating the struggle for economic and social rights in Africa
- Heretical Reflections on the Right to Self-Determination: Prospects and Problems for a Democratic Global Future in the New Millenium
- Civil society and the political economy of foreign aid in Uganda
- The question of Buganda in contemporary Ugandan politics
- The plight of the larger half: Human rights, gender violence and the legal status of refugee and internally displaced women in Africa
- Human rights, the OAU Convention and the refugee crisis in Africa: Forty years after Geneva
- Constitutional transition in Museveni's Uganda: new horizons or another false start?
- Bitches at the academy: Gender and academic freedom at the African university
- Uganda's 'Benevolent'Dictatorship
- Police Powers, Human Rights and the State in Kenya and Uganda: A Comparatice Analysis
- The place and role of the OAU Bureau for refugees in the African refugee crisis
- The Dynamics of Corruption Control and Human Rights Enforcement in Uganda: The Case of the Inspector General of Government
- Uganda: studies in living conditions, popular movements, and constitutionalism
- Decentralization without human rights?: local governance and access to justice in post-movement Uganda.
- Who's watching'Big Brother'? Globalisation and the protection of cultural rights in present-day Africa
- Governance, Democracy and Development in Uganda Today: A socio-legal Examination
- Poverty, human rights and the quest for sustainable human development in structurally-adjusted Uganda
- Forced Displacement and the Situation of Refugee and Internally Displaced Women in Africa
- Movement-Related Rights in the Context of Internal Displacement
- 'Taming'the President: Some Critical Reflections on the Executive and the Separation of Powers in Uganda
- Development Financing: The Case of the Uganda Development Bank.
- Age-based discrimination and the rights of the elderly in Uganda: conference paper
- Obote: A Political Biography
- The personal is political, or why women's rights are indeed human rights: An African perspective on international feminism
- Liberalization Without Liberation: Understanding the Paradoxes of Opening the Political Spaces in Uganda
- Pastoralism, crisis and transformation in Karamoja.
