= Ntambirweki =

Ntambirweki is a surname. Notable people with the surname include:

- Barbara Ntambirweki (born 1981), Ugandan lawyer, academic, and activist
- John Ntambirweki (born 1955), Ugandan lawyer, academic, and academic administrator
