= Committee for Development Policy =

Comité de Políticas de Desarrollo

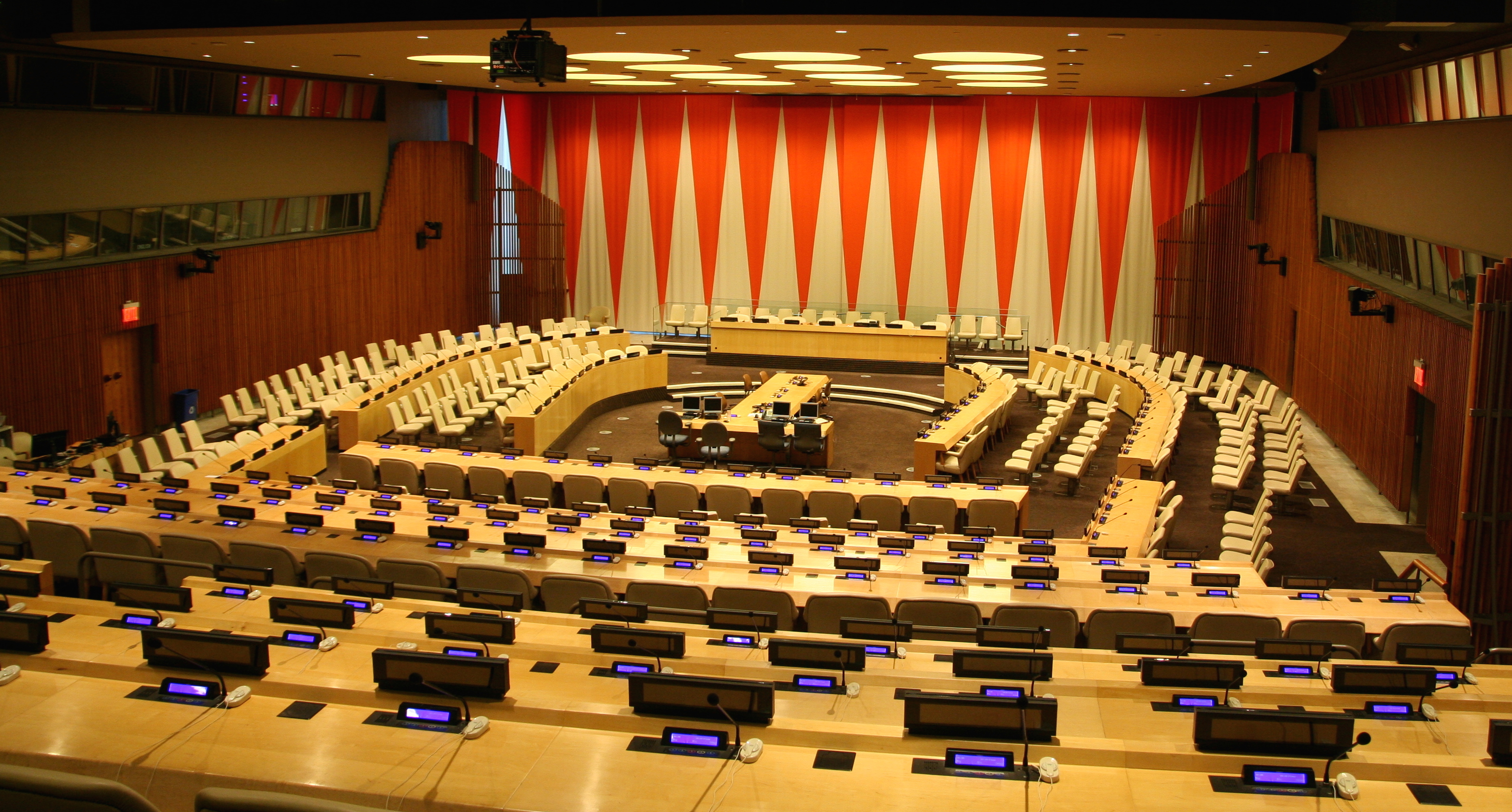
- The room of the United Nations Economic and Social Council. UN headquarters, New York City
- Abbreviation: CDP; CPD
- Legal status: Active
- Website: cdp.un.org

The Committee for Development Policy (CDP; Spanish: Comité de Políticas de Desarrollo, CPD) is a subsidiary body of the United Nations Economic and Social Council (ECOSOC). The task of the CDP is to provide independent advice to the Council on development policy issues. The Committee is also responsible for deciding which countries can be considered least developed countries (LDCs).

The Committee has 24 members, nominated in their personal capacity by the United Nations Secretary-General and appointed by ECOSOC for a period of three years. The Secretariat of the Committee for Development Policy, in the United Nations Department of Economic and Social Affairs, Economic Analysis and Policy Division, provides substantive and administrative assistance to the Committee.

== Membership ==
The last three-year term began on 1 January 2019. Members for the period from 2019 to 2021 are:

- Adriana Abdenur (Brazil)
- Debapriya Bhattacharya (Bangladesh)
- Winnie Byanyima (Uganda)
- Ha-Joon Chang (Republic of Korea)
- Diane Elson (United Kingdom)
- Marc Fleurbaey (France)
- Sakiko Fukuda-Parr (Japan)
- Kevin Gallagher (United States)
- Arunabha Ghosh (India)
- Sen Gong (China)
- Trudi Hartzenberg (South Africa)
- Rashid Hassan (Sudan)
- Stephan Klasen (Germany)
- Amina Mama (Nigeria)
- Mariana Mazzucato (Italy)
- Leticia Merino (Mexico)
- Jacqueline Musiitwa (Zambia)
- Keith Nurse (Trinidad and Tobago)
- José Antonio Ocampo (Colombia)
- Meg Taylor (Papua New Guinea)
- Taffere Tesfachew (Ethiopia)
- Rolph van der Hoeven (Netherlands)
- Kori Udovicki (Serbia)
- Natalya Volchkova (Russian Federation)
