= Ubuntu philosophy =

Southern African philosophy

Ubuntu (Zulu pronunciation: [ùɓúntʼù]; meaning 'humanity' in some Bantu languages, such as Zulu and Xhosa) describes a set of closely related Bantu African-origin value systems that emphasize the interconnectedness of individuals with their surrounding social and physical worlds. "Ubuntu" is sometimes translated as "I am because We are". In Xhosa, the term is used, but is often meant in a more philosophical sense to mean "the belief in a Universal bond of sharing that connects all humanity".

== Different names in Africa ==
Although the most popular term referring to the philosophy today is "Ubuntu", the philosophy stretches back to the beginning of proto-Bantu language and has many other names in other African languages.

Angola (gimuntu); Botswana (muthu, batho); Burkina Faso, Cote d’Ivoire, Equatorial Guinea, Guinea, Gambia Liberia, Sierra Leonne and Mali (maaya); Burundi (ubuntu); Cameroon (bato); Congo (bantu); Democratic Republic of Congo (bomoto, kimuntu or bantu); Egypt (maat); Ethiopia (medemer, edir, kiree, mahiber, debo); Ghana (biako ye); Kenya (utu, munto, omundu or mondo); Malawi (umunthu); Mozambique (vumuntu); Namibia (omundu); Nigeria (mutunchi, iwa, agwa, omwayaonyamo); Rwanda (ubuntu); South Africa (ubuntu, ubundu or botho); South Sudan (nhiar-baai); Tanzania (utu, obuntu or bumuntu); Uganda (obuntu, obuntubulamu); Zambia (umunthu); and Zimbabwe (unhu, hunhu, ubuntu, ibuntu).

"Humanity" in Bantu languages
Countries	Language	Word
Angola, DRC, ROC	Kongo	kimuntu, gimuntu
Botswana	Setswana	botho
Burundi, Rwanda	Kinyarwanda, Kirundi	ubuntu
Cameroon	Sawabantu	bato
DRC	Kongo, Luba-Kasai	bomoto, bantu
Kenya	Kikuyu	umundu (Note: "Person". Not a true class 14 word for "humanity".)
Kenya	Ekegusii	obonto
Kenya	Luhya	omundu
Kenya	Meru	munto
Kenya, Tanzania	Swahili	utu
Mozambique	Makua	vumuntu
Namibia	Otjiherero	omundu
Namibia	Oshiwambo	omuntu
Namibia	Rukwangali	muntu
South Africa, Lesotho	Sesotho	botho
South Africa	Tshivenda	vhuthu
South Africa, Zimbabwe	Ndebele, Xhosa, Zulu	ubuntu
Uganda	Luganda	obuuntu
Zambia, Malawi	Chewa and Chitumbuka	umunthu
Zambia	Tonga	ibuntu
Zimbabwe	Shona	unhu, hunhu

== Definitions ==
Nelson Mandela in 2006 was asked to define "ubuntu" in a video used to launch Ubuntu Linux.

There are many different definitions of Ubuntu. Even with the various definitions, Ubuntu encompasses the interdependence of humans on one another and the acknowledgment of one's responsibility to their fellow humans and the world around them. It is a philosophy that supports collectivism over individualism.

The African Journal of Social Work (AJSW) defines Ubuntu as:

A collection of values and practices that people of Africa or of African origin view as making people authentic human beings. While the nuances of these values and practices vary across different ethnic groups, they all point to one thing: an authentic individual human being is part of a larger and more significant relational, communal, societal, environmental and spiritual world

A Zulu-speaking person who when commanding to speak in Zulu would say "khuluma isintu", which means "speak the language of people". When someone behaves according to custom, a Sotho-speaking person would say "ke motho", which means "he/she is a human". The aspect of this that would be exemplified by a tale told (often in private quarters) in Nguni is "kushone abantu ababili ne Shangaan", in Sepedi "go tlhokofetje batho ba babedi le leShangane", in English (two people died and one Shangaan). In each of these examples, humanity comes from conforming to or being part of the tribe.

According to Michael Onyebuchi Eze, the core of Ubuntu can best be summarised as follows:

A person is a person through people strikes an affirmation of one’s humanity through recognition of an "other" in his or her uniqueness and difference. It is a demand for a creative intersubjective formation in which the "other" becomes a mirror (but only a mirror) for my subjectivity. This idealism suggests to us that humanity is not embedded in my person solely as an individual; my humanity is co-substantively bestowed upon the other and me. Humanity is a quality we owe to each other. We create each other and need to sustain this otherness creation. And if we belong to each other, we participate in our creations: we are because you are, and since you are, definitely I am. The "I am" is not a rigid subject, but a dynamic self-constitution dependent on this otherness creation of relation and distance.

An "extroverted communities" aspect is the most visible part of this ideology. There is social warmth with which people treat both strangers and members of the community. This overt display of warmth is not merely aesthetic but enables the formation of spontaneous communities. The resultant collaborative work within these spontaneous communities transcends the aesthetic and gives functional significance to the value of warmth. Warmth is not the sine qua non of community formation but guards against instrumentalist relationships. Unfortunately, sincere warmth may leave one vulnerable to those with ulterior motives.

"Ubuntu" as political philosophy encourages community equality, propagating the distribution of wealth. This socialisation is a vestige of agrarian peoples as a hedge against the crop failures of individuals. Socialisation presupposes a community population with which individuals empathise and, concomitantly, have a vested interest in its collective prosperity. Urbanisation and the aggregation of people into an abstract and bureaucratic state undermines this empathy. African intellectual historians like Michael Onyebuchi Eze have argued, however, that this idea of "collective responsibility" must not be understood as absolute in which the community's good is prior to the individual's good. On this view, ubuntu it is argued, is a communitarian philosophy that is widely differentiated from the Western notion of communitarian socialism. In fact, ubuntu induces an ideal of shared human subjectivity that promotes a community's good through an unconditional recognition and appreciation of individual uniqueness and difference. Audrey Tang has suggested that Ubuntu "implies that everyone has different skills and strengths; people are not isolated, and through mutual support they can help each other to complete themselves."

"Redemption" relates to how people deal with errant, deviant, and dissident members of the community. The belief is that man is born formless like a lump of clay. It is up to the community, as a whole, to use the fire of experience and the wheel of social control to mould him into a pot that may contribute to society. Any imperfections should be borne by the community and the community should always seek to redeem man. An example of this is the statement by the African National Congress (in South Africa) that it does not throw out its own but rather redeems.

Other scholars such as Mboti (2015) argue that the normative definition of Ubuntu, notwithstanding its intuitive appeal, is still open to doubt. The definition of Ubuntu, contends Mboti, has remained consistently and purposely fuzzy, inadequate and inconsistent. Mboti rejects the interpretation that Africans are "naturally" interdependent and harmony-seeking, and that humanity is given to a person by and through other persons. He sees a philosophical trap in attempts to elevate harmony to a moral duty – a sort of categorical imperative – that Africans must simply uphold. Mboti cautions against relying on intuitions in attempts to say what Ubuntu is or is not. He concludes that the phrase umuntu ngumuntu ngabantu references a messier, undisciplined relationship between persons, stating that: "First, there is value in regarding a broken relationship as being authentically human as much as a harmonious relationship. Second, a broken relationship can be as ethically desirable as a harmonious one. For instance, freedom follows from a break from oppression. Finally, harmonious relations can be as oppressive and false as disharmonious ones. For instance, the cowboy and his horse are in a harmonious relationship."

== Ubuntu maxims or short statements ==
Ubuntu is often presented in short statements called maxims by Samkange (1980). Some of these are:

- Motho ke motho ka batho (Sotho/Tswana). A person is a person through people.
- Umuntu ngumuntu ngabantu (Zulu). A person is a person through people.
- Umntu ngumntu ngabantu (Xhosa). A person is a person through people.
- Munhu munhu nevanhu (Shona). A person through people.
- Ndiri nekuti tiri (Shona). I am because we are.
- Munhu i munhu hivanwani vanhu (Xitsonga). A person is a person through people.
- Muthu ndi muthu nga vhathu (Venda). A person is a person through people.
- Uuntu womuntu aantu (Oshindonga). A person is a person through others.

== History of the concept in African written sources ==
Ubuntu has been in existence in orature (oral literature) and in the culture of Bantu peoples. It appeared in South African written sources from as early as the mid-19th century. Reported translations covered the semantic field of "human nature, humanness, humanity; virtue, goodness, kindness". Grammatically, the word combines the root -ntʊ̀ "person, human being" with the class 14 ubu- prefix forming abstract nouns, so that the term is exactly parallel in formation to the abstract noun humanity.

The concept was popularised in terms of a "philosophy" or "world view" (as opposed to a quality attributed to an individual) beginning in the 1950s, notably in the writings of Jordan Kush Ngubane published in the African Drum magazine. From the 1970s, the ubuntu began to be described as a specific kind of "African humanism". Based on the context of Africanisation propagated by the political thinkers in the 1960s period of decolonisation, ubuntu was used as a term for a specifically African (or Southern African) kind of humanism found in the context of the transition to majority rule in Zimbabwe and South Africa.

The first publication dedicated to ubuntu as a philosophical concept appeared in 1980, Hunhuism or Ubuntuism: A Zimbabwe Indigenous Political Philosophy (hunhu being the Shona equivalent of Nguni ubuntu) by Stanlake J. W. T. Samkange. Hunhuism or Ubuntuism is presented as political ideology for the new Zimbabwe, as Southern Rhodesia attained independence from the United Kingdom.

The concept was used in South Africa in the 1990s as a guiding ideal for the transition from apartheid to majority rule. The term appears in the Epilogue of the Interim Constitution of South Africa (1993): "there is a need for understanding but not for vengeance, a need for reparation but not for retaliation, a need for ubuntu but not for victimisation".

In South Africa, it has come to be used as a contested term for a kind of humanist philosophy, ethic, or ideology, also termed Ubuntuism propagated in the Africanisation (transition to majority rule) process of these countries during the 1980s and 1990s. New research has begun to question the exclusive "humanism" framing, and thus to suggest that ubuntu can have a "militaristic" angle – an ubuntu for warriors.

In Uganda the term is used in people's everyday language as a way to relate to one another and call for community. The term can also be used to criticize another's actions if one states that they have lost "Obuuntu" (their humanity). Ugandan feminist scholar Sylvia Tamale has also written a book titled Decolonization and Afro-Feminism, offering a holistic view of Ubuntu as a decolonial ethic rooted in African communal values, relational accountability, and feminist justice.

Since the transition to democracy in South Africa with the Nelson Mandela presidency in 1994, the term has become more widely known outside of Southern Africa, notably popularised to English-language readers through the ubuntu theology of Desmond Tutu. Tutu was the chairman of the South African Truth and Reconciliation Commission (TRC), and many have argued that ubuntu was a formative influence on the TRC.

== By country ==
=== Zimbabwe ===
In the Shona language, the majority spoken language in Zimbabwe, ubuntu is unhu or hunhu. In Ndebele, it is known as ubuntu. The concept of ubuntu is viewed the same in Zimbabwe as in other African cultures. The Shona phrase munhu munhu nekuda kwevanhu means a person is human through others while ndiri nekuti tiri means I am because we are.

Samkange (1980) highlights the three maxims of Hunhuism or Ubuntuism that shape this philosophy: The first maxim asserts that 'To be human is to affirm one's humanity by recognizing the humanity of others and, on that basis, establish respectful human relations with them.' And 'the second maxim means that if and when one is faced with a decisive choice between wealth and the preservation of the life of another human being, then one should opt for the preservation of life'. The third 'maxim' as a 'principle deeply embedded in traditional African political philosophy' says 'that the king owed his status, including all the powers associated with it, to the will of the people under him'.

=== South Africa ===
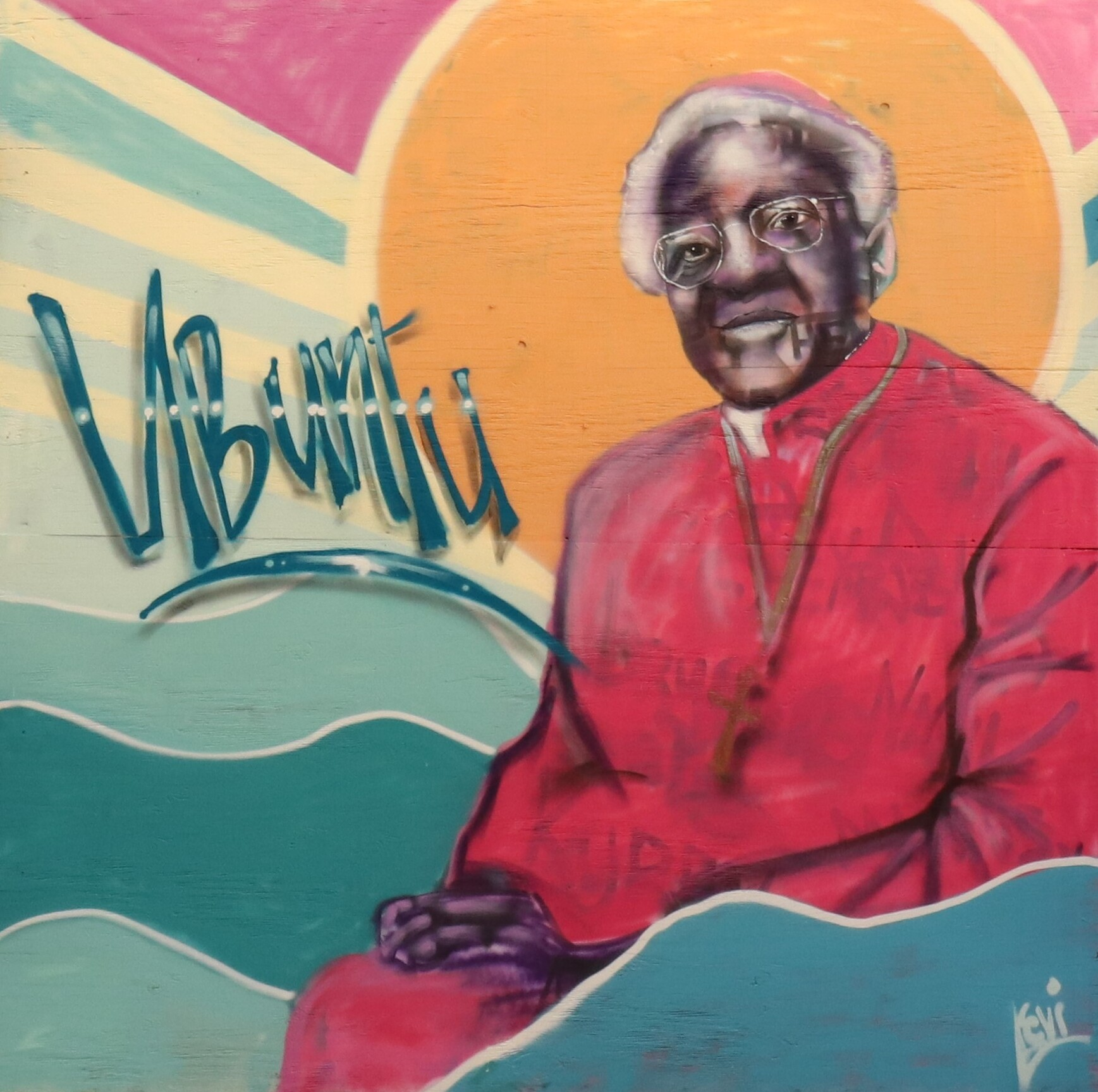
Archbishop Desmond Tutu is often associated with "ubuntu theology"

Ubuntu: "I am what I am because of who we all are." (From a definition offered by Liberian peace activist Leymah Gbowee.)

Archbishop Desmond Tutu offered a definition in a 1999 book:

A person with Ubuntu is open and available to others, affirming of others, does not feel threatened that others are able and good, based from a proper self-assurance that comes from knowing that he or she belongs in a greater whole and is diminished when others are humiliated or diminished, when others are tortured or oppressed.

Tutu further explained Ubuntu in 2008:

One of the sayings in our country is Ubuntu - the essence of being human. Ubuntu speaks particularly about the fact that you can't exist as a human being in isolation. It speaks about our interconnectedness. You can't be human all by yourself, and when you have this quality - Ubuntu - you are known for your generosity.

We think of ourselves far too frequently as just individuals, separated from one another, whereas you are connected and what you do affects the whole world. When you do well, it spreads out; it is for the whole of humanity.

Nelson Mandela explained Ubuntu as follows:

A traveller through a country would stop at a village and he didn't have to ask for food or for water. Once he stops, the people give him food and attend him. That is one aspect of Ubuntu, but it will have various aspects. Ubuntu does not mean that people should not address themselves. The question therefore is: Are you going to do so in order to enable the community around you to be able to improve?

Tim Jackson refers to Ubuntu as a philosophy that supports the changes he says are necessary to create a future that is economically and environmentally sustainable. Judge Colin Lamont expanded on the definition during his ruling on the hate speech trial of Julius Malema.

At Nelson Mandela's memorial, United States President Barack Obama spoke about Ubuntu, saying,

There is a word in South Africa – Ubuntu – a word that captures Mandela's greatest gift: his recognition that we are all bound together in ways that are invisible to the eye; that there is a oneness to humanity; that we achieve ourselves by sharing ourselves with others, and caring for those around us.

We can never know how much of this sense was innate in him, or how much was shaped in a dark and solitary cell. But we remember the gestures, large and small – introducing his jailers as honored guests at his inauguration; taking a pitch in a Springbok uniform; turning his family’s heartbreak into a call to confront HIV/AIDS – that revealed the depth of his empathy and his understanding. He not only embodied Ubuntu, he taught millions to find that truth within themselves.

=== Malawi ===
In Malawi, the same philosophy is called "uMunthu" in the local Chewa language. According to the Catholic Diocese of Zomba bishop Rt. Rev. Fr. Thomas Msusa, "The African worldview is about living as one family, belonging to God". Msusa noted that in Africa "We say 'I am because we are', or in Chichewa kali kokha nkanyama, tili awiri ntiwanthu (when you are on your own you are as good as an animal of the wild; when there are two of you, you form a community)."

The philosophy of uMunthu has been passed on through proverbs such as Mwana wa mnzako ngwako yemwe, ukachenjera manja udya naye (your neighbor's child is your own, his/her success is your success too). Some notable Malawian uMunthu philosophers and intellectuals who have written about this worldview are Augustine Musopole, Gerard Chigona, Chiwoza Bandawe, Richard Tambulasi, Harvey Kwiyani and Happy Kayuni. This includes Malawian philosopher and theologist Harvey Sindima’s treatment of uMunthu as an important African philosophy is highlighted in his 1995 book Africa’s Agenda: The legacy of liberalism and colonialism in the crisis of African values. In film, the English translation of the proverb is the title of Madonna's 2008 documentary film, I Am Because We Are, about Malawian orphans.

== Applications ==
=== In diplomacy ===
In June 2009, in her swearing-in remarks as US Department of State Special Representative for Global Partnerships, Global Partnership Initiative, Office of the Secretary of State, Elizabeth Frawley Bagley discussed ubuntu in the context of American foreign policy, stating: "In understanding the responsibilities that come with our interconnectedness, we realize that we must rely on each other to lift our World from where it is now to where we want it to be in our lifetime, while casting aside our worn out preconceptions, and our outdated modes of statecraft." She then introduced the notion of "Ubuntu Diplomacy" with the following words:

In 21st-century diplomacy, the Department of State will be a convener, bringing people together from across regions and sectors to work together on issues of common interest. Our work no longer depends on the least common denominator; but rather, we will seek the highest possible multiplier effect for the results we can achieve together.

We will also act as a catalyst, with our Foreign Service Officers launching new projects in tandem with those NGOs, philanthropies, and corporations at the front lines of foreign affairs to discover untapped potential, inspire fresh ideas, and create new solutions.

And we will act as a collaborator, leading interagency coordination here in Washington and cross-sector collaboration in the field, with our Ambassadors working closely with our non-governmental partners to plan and implement projects for maximum impact and sustainability.

It takes a shared, global response to meet the shared, global challenges we face. This is the truth taught to us in an old South African principle, ubuntu, or 'A person is a person through other persons.' As Archbishop Desmond Tutu describes this perspective, ubuntu 'is not, "I think therefore I am." It says rather: "I am a human because I belong. I participate. I share."' In essence, I am because you are.

We are truly all in this together, and we will only succeed by building mutually beneficial partnerships among civil society, the private sector, and the public sector, in order to empower the men and women executing our foreign policy to advance their work through partnerships.

The truth and reconciliation council believed in the philosophy of Ubuntu because they believed that Ubuntu was going to help to reform and reconnect the already broken country of South Africa.

This is Ubuntu Diplomacy: where all sectors belong as partners, where we all participate as stakeholders, and where we all succeed together, not incrementally but exponentially.

=== In education ===
In education, Ubuntu has been used to guide and promote African education, and to decolonise it from Western educational philosophies. Zimbabwean historian and philosopher Stanlake J. W. T. Samkange was among the earliest writers to formalize Ubuntu (as Hunhuism), framing it as a distinctly African ethical and educational system rooted in indigenous knowledge and postcolonial identity. Ugandan feminist scholar Sylvia Tamale has further developed Ubuntu as a decolonial and feminist ethic, arguing that it offers a counter-hegemonic alternative to Western liberalism and can be applied to gender justice, legal reform, academic transformation and interdependent leadership.

Ubuntu education uses the family, community, society, environment and spirituality as sources of knowledge but also as teaching and learning media. The essence of education is family, community, societal and environmental well-being. Ubuntu education is about learners becoming critical about their social conditions. Interaction, participation, recognition, respect and inclusion are important aspects of ubuntu education. Methods of teaching and learning include groups and community approaches. The objectives, content, methodology and outcomes of education are shaped by Ubuntu.

=== In social work, welfare and development ===
Applications in social work, welfare and development reference Afrocentric ways of providing a social safety-net to vulnerable members of society. Common elements include collectivity. The approach helps to "validate worldview and traditions suppressed by Western Eurocentric cultural hegemony". It opposes materialism and individualism. It looks at an individual person holistically. The social interventions performed by social workers, welfare workers and development workers should strengthen, not weaken families, communities, society, the environment and peoples' spirituality. These are the five pillars of ubuntu intervention: family, community, society, environment and spirituality. Ubuntu is the current theme for the Global Agenda for Social Work and Social Development and represents the highest level of global messaging within the social-work profession for the years 2020–2030. Utilising biopsychosocial and ecological system approaches, ubuntu is a philosophy that is applicable in clinical social work in mental health.

=== In research ===
Ubuntu can guide research objectives, ethics and methodology. Using ubuntu research approach provides researchers with an African oriented tool that decolonises research agenda and methodology. The objectives of ubuntu research are to empower families, communities and society at large. In doing ubuntu research, the position of the researcher is important because it helps create research relationships. The agenda of the research belongs to the community, and true participation is highly valued. Ujamaa is valued, it means pulling together or collaboration.

=== In moral philosophy ===
According to this philosophy, "actions are right roughly insofar as they are a matter of living harmoniously with others or honouring communal relationships", "One's ultimate goal should be to become a full person, a real self or a genuine human being". Ukama, i.e. relationships are important. Among the Shona people, for example, when a person dies, his or her property is shared amongst relatives and there are culturally approved ways of doing this. The practice is called kugova. Samkange (1980)'s maxim on morality says "If and when one is faced with a decisive choice between wealth and the preservation of the life of another human being, then one should opt for the preservation of life".

=== In politics and leadership ===
Samkange (1980) said no foreign political philosophy can be useful in a country more than the indigenous philosophies. "Is there a philosophy or ideology indigenous to (a) country that can serve its people just as well, if not better than, foreign ideologies?", asked Samkange in the book Hunhuism or Ubuntuism. His maxim for leadership is "The king owes his status, including all the powers associated with it, to the will of the people under him".

Ugandan feminist scholar Sylvia Tamale has extended Ubuntu’s relevance to contemporary leadership, framing it as a model of interdependent leadership rooted in relational ethics and collective responsibility. In her book Decolonization and Afro-Feminism, she argues that Ubuntu offers a counter-hegemonic alternative to hierarchical and individualistic Western paradigms, promoting leadership that is embedded in community, humility, and mutual care.

=== In social justice, criminal justice and jurisprudence ===
Ubuntu justice has elements different from western societies: it values repairing relationships. Ubuntu justice emphasises these elements:

1. Deterrence which can be done socially, physically, economically or spiritually
2. Returning and Replacement – meaning bring back what has been stolen, replacing it or compensating. In Shona language this is called kudzora and kuripa
3. Apology, Forgiveness and Reconciliation (restoration of ukama or relations) after meeting the above
4. Warnings and Punishments (retribution) from leaders and elders if the above have not been achieved or ignored
5. Warnings and Punishments from spiritual beings if the above have not been met. In Shona culture, these are called jambwa and ngozi

Families, and at times community are involved in the process of justice.

African scholars have noted that while some elements of Ubuntu are liberating to women, others "marginalize and disempower" them, and "can be seen as engendering patriarchy".

Ubuntu has also been associated with restorative justice Some scholars have argued that restorative justice practices are embedded in the Ubuntu philosophy which shares similarities with their philosophy, values and practices. Within the restorative justice context, ubuntu is understood as African humanism, a philosophy, an ethic, and as a worldview. The underlying restorative justice value of power sharing is very much aligned with the Ubuntu philosophy which "sees" the other through their humanity.

== In popular culture ==
Ubuntu was a major theme in John Boorman's 2004 film In My Country. Former US president Bill Clinton used the term at the 2006 Labour Party conference in the UK to explain why society is important.

The Boston Celtics, the 2008 NBA champions, have chanted "ubuntu" when breaking a huddle since the start of the 2007–2008 season. The first episode of the 2020 Netflix docuseries The Playbook shows how Boston Celtic's coach, Glenn Anton "Doc" Rivers learned of the Ubuntu philosophy. The documentary then explores the impact of the philosophy on the team members and how it became their guiding principle.

At the 2002 UN World Summit on Sustainable Development (WSSD), there was an Ubuntu Village exposition centre. Ubuntu was the theme of the 76th General Convention of the American Episcopal Church. The logo includes the text "I in You and You in Me".

First released in October 2004, a prominent computer software package is named the Ubuntu operating system. Its development was led by Mark Shuttleworth, a South African entrepreneur and owner of the UK-based company Canonical Ltd.

In film, the English translation of the proverb was used for the title of pop singer Madonna's 2008 documentary film I Am Because We Are about Malawian orphans. An accompanying book of the same name was published in 2009.

A character in the 2008 animated comedy The Goode Family is named Ubuntu Goode.

Ubuntu was the title and theme of an EP released by British band Clockwork Radio in 2012.

Ubuntu was the title of an EP released by American rapper Sage Francis in 2012.

Ubuntu was chosen as the name of a clan of meerkats in the 2021 season of Meerkat Manor: Rise of the Dynasty.

== See also ==
- Traditional African religions
- African philosophy
- Bantu peoples
- Nguni languages
- Africanization
- Decolonisation
- Ethics
- Ethic of reciprocity
- Harambee (Kenyan/Swahili concept)
- Humanity (virtue)
- Negotiations to end apartheid in South Africa
- Pan-Africanism
- Ubuntu theology
- Universalism
- Social construction
- Agape
