= Apollo Makubuya =

Ugandan lawyer

- Born: Uganda
- Citizenship: Uganda
- Education: Makerere University (Bachelor of Laws); Law Development Centre (Diploma in Legal Practice); University of Cambridge (Master of Laws)
- Occupation: Lawyer
- Years active: 1993–present
- Known for: Legal expertise
- Title: Chairman of Equity Bank Uganda Limited

Apollo Nelson Makubuya is a Ugandan corporate lawyer and author, who serves as the chairperson of the board of directors at Equity Bank Uganda Limited, one of Uganda's commercial banks. He was appointed to that position in March 2017.

== Early life and education ==
Makubuya was born in Uganda in the 1960s. After attending local primary and secondary schools, he was admitted to Makerere University Law School, where he graduated with a Bachelor of Laws degree. He went on to obtain a Diploma in Legal Practice, from the Law Development Centre, in Kampala, Uganda's capital city. He was then admitted to the Uganda Bar, as a practicing attorney. Later, he obtained a Master of Laws degree, from the University of Cambridge, in the United Kingdom.

== Career ==
Apollo Makubuya is a partner at MMAKS Advocates, an upscale legal firm based in Kampala, Uganda. He is a member of the Corporate Advisory team at the firm and serves a Co-Managing Partner at MMAKS Advocates.

He has extensive experience in the field of international human rights law. Makubuya advises banks, mining companies, regional and international investors on corporate, commercial law and tax issues.

Before going into private practice, he was a legal advisor at a private bank. He also served as the assistant head of the Financial Sector Adjustment Credit (FSAC) division of the Bank of Uganda, the country's central bank. He also has served as a consultant on human rights, development and corporate law issues with the Uganda Human Rights Commission, DANIDA and UNDP.

== Family ==
Apollo Makubuya was married to the late Stella Nansikombi Makubuya (11 November 1967 – 5 September 2018), a fellow lawyer and women's rights activist. Together, they are parents to three daughters (a) Athena Mulungi Nakku (b) Angela Kitiibwa Nakimuli and (c) Andrea Kwagalakwe Nabakka. He is married to Anne Juuko, the chief executive officer of Stanbic Bank Uganda Limited, since January 2022.

== Other considerations ==
Apollo Makubuya concurrently serves as the Chief Palace Advisor to the Kabaka of Buganda, a constitutional monarch, currently Ronald Muwenda Mutebi II. He was appointed to that position in February 2019, having previously served as Buganda's Third Deputy Prime Minister, Minister of Justice and Constitutional Affairs and Attorney General

== Books ==
- Protection, Patronage, or Plunder? Imperial Machinations and (B)ugandas Struggle for Independence.

== Decolonization campaign ==
He is a known campaigner about decolonization of African heritage and on June 25, 2020, he presented the petition to the speaker of the Ugandan parliament signed by 5,200 people calling for the removal of symbols, street names, monuments and other colonial relics in Uganda that represent a nefarious legacy of colonial conquest, occupation, exploitation and impunity.

== See also ==
- Jacqueline Musiitwa
- Stella Nansikombi Makubuya
- Anne Juuko
