= Makubuya =

Makubuya is a surname. Notable people with the surname include:

- James Makubuya, Ugandan ethnomusicologist, musician, dancer, and choreographer
- Keith Makubuya (born 1993), Canadian soccer player
- Kiddu Makubuya (born 1949), Ugandan lawyer, politician and academic
- Apollo Makubuya, corporate lawyer, serves as the chairperson of the board of at Equity Bank Uganda.
