= Least developed countries =

Countries that exhibit the lowest indicators of socioeconomic development

Least developed countries (designated by the UN as of 2025) Former least developed countries

The least developed countries (LDCs) are developing countries listed by the United Nations that exhibit the lowest indicators of socioeconomic development. The concept of LDCs originated in the late 1960s and the first group of LDCs was listed by the UN in its resolution 2768 (XXVI) on 18 November 1971.

A country can be classified among the least developed countries when it meets the three following criteria:

- Poverty – adjustable criterion based on the gross national income (GNI) per capita averaged over three years. As of 2024, a country must have GNI per capita less than US$1,088 to be included on the list, and over $1,306 to graduate from it ($3,918 under income-only threshold).
- Low levels of human assets (based on indicators of nutrition, health, education and adult literacy). A country must have human assets index (HAI) score less than 60 to be included on the list, and over 66 to graduate from it.
- Economic vulnerability (based on instability of agricultural production, instability of exports of goods and services, economic importance of non-traditional activities, merchandise export concentration, handicap of economic smallness, and the percentage of population displaced by natural disasters). A country must have Economic Vulnerability Index (EVI) score over 36 to be included on the list, and less than 32 to graduate from it.

As of December 2024, 44 countries were still classified as LDC, while eight graduated between 1994 and 2024. The World Trade Organization (WTO) recognizes the UN list and says that "Measures taken in the framework of the WTO can help LDCs increase their exports to other WTO members and attract investment. In many developing countries, pro-market reforms have encouraged faster growth, diversification of exports, and more effective participation in the multilateral trading system."

== Overview ==
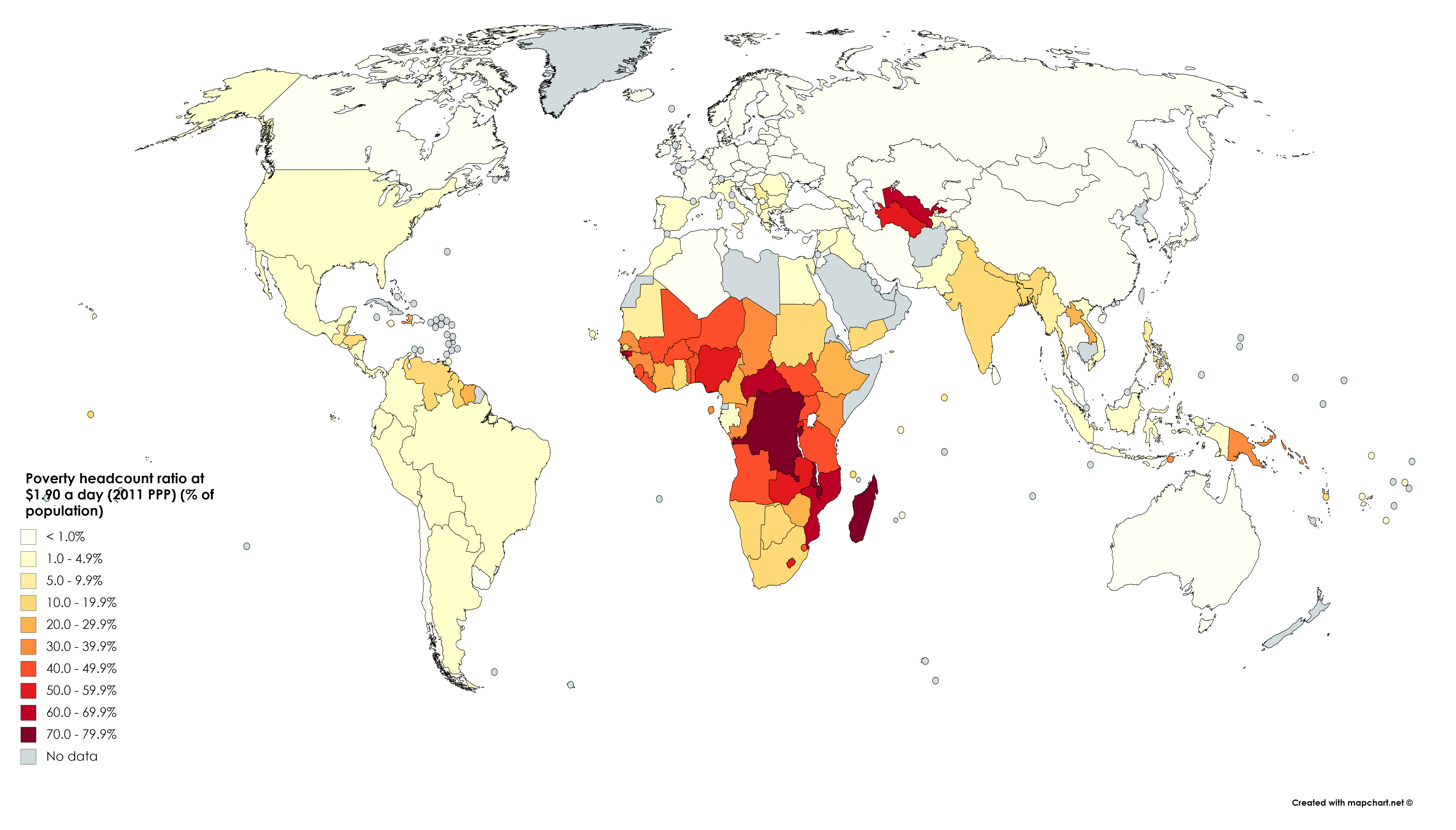
Poverty headcount ratio at $1.90 a day (1998-2018)

LDC criteria are reviewed every three years by the Committee for Development Policy (CDP) of the UN Economic and Social Council (ECOSOC). Countries may be removed from the LDC classification when indicators exceed these criteria in two consecutive triennial reviews. The United Nations Office of the High Representative for the Least Developed Countries, Landlocked Developing Countries and Small Island Developing States (UN-OHRLLS) coordinates UN support and provides advocacy services for Least Developed Countries. The classification (as of December 2024) applies to 44 countries.

At the UN's fourth conference on LDCs, which was held in May 2011, delegates endorsed a goal targeting the promotion of at least half the current LDC countries within the next ten years. As of 2018, ten or more countries were expected to graduate in 2024, with Bangladesh already satisfying all criteria in 2018.

No country presently meets the criteria and there are three countries which previously met the criteria for LDC status, but declined to be included in the index, questioning the validity or accuracy of the CDP's data: Ghana (no longer meets criteria as of 1994), Papua New Guinea (no longer meets criteria as of 2009) and Zimbabwe (no longer meets criteria as of 2018).

== Usage and abbreviations ==
Least developed countries can be distinguished from developing countries, "less developed countries", "lesser developed countries", or other similar terms.

The term "less economically developed country" (LEDC) is also used today. However, in order to avoid confusion between "least developed country" and "less economically developed country" (which may both be abbreviated as LDC), and to avoid confusion with landlocked developing country (which can be abbreviated as LLDC), "developing country" is generally used in preference to "less-developed country".

During a United Nations review in 2018, the UN defined LDCs as countries meeting three criteria, one of which was a three-year average estimate of gross national income (GNI) per capita of less than US$1,025.

== UN conferences ==
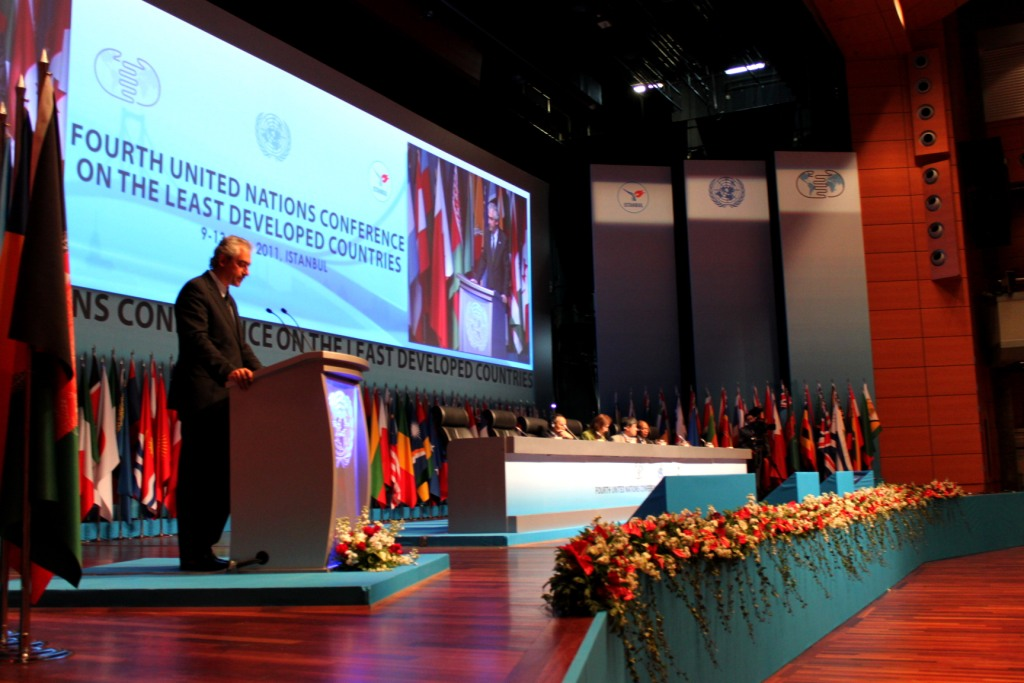
Deputy Foreign Minister of Greece Spyros Kouvelis at the 4th UN Conference on Least Developed Countries

There have been five United Nations conferences on LDCs, held every ten years. The first two were in Paris, in 1981 and 1991; the third was in Brussels in 2001.

The Fourth UN Conference on Least Developed Countries (LDC-IV) was held in Istanbul, Turkey, on 9–13 May 2011. It was attended by Ban Ki-moon, the head of the UN, and close to 50 prime ministers and heads of state. The conference endorsed the goal of raising half the existing Least developed countries out of the LDC category in 2022. As with the Seoul Development Consensus drawn up in 2010, there was a strong emphasis on boosting productive capability and physical infrastructure, with several NGOs not pleased with the emphasis placed on the private sector.

The Fifth UN Conference on Least Developed Countries (LDC-V) was split in two parts almost a year apart, between UN Headquarters in New York on 17 March 2022 and Doha on 5–9 March 2023.

== Trade ==
Issues surrounding global trade regulations and LDCs have gained a lot of media and policy attention thanks to the recently collapsed Doha Round of World Trade Organization (WTO) negotiations being termed a development round. During the WTO's Hong Kong Ministerial, it was agreed that LDCs could see 100 percent duty-free, quota-free access to U.S. markets if the round were completed. But analysis of the deal by NGOs found that the text of the proposed LDC deal had substantial loopholes that might make the offer less than the full 100 percent access, and could even erase some current duty-free access of LDCs to rich country markets. Dissatisfaction with these loopholes led some economists to call for a reworking of the Hong Kong deal.

Chiedu Osakwe, as of 2001 the Director, Technical Cooperation Division at the Secretariat of the WTO, and adviser to the Director-General on developing country matters, was appointed as the WTO Special Coordinator for the Least Developed Countries beginning in 1999. He worked closely with the five other agencies that together with the WTO constitute the Integrated Framework of action for the Least Developed Countries. They addressed issues of market access, special and differential treatment provisions for developing countries, participation of developing countries in the multilateral trading system, and development questions, especially the interests of developing countries in competition policy. At the 28th G8 summit in Kananaskis, Alberta, Canadian Prime Minister Jean Chrétien proposed and carried the Market Access Initiative, so that the then 48 LDCs could profit from "trade-not-aid". Additionally, the United Nations Sustainable Development Goal 14 advocates for an effective special and differential treatment of LDCs as integral parts of WTO fisheries subsidies negotiation.

=== Market access preferences ===
Several countries grant preferential access to least developed countries. For instance, the European Union has implemented the Everything but Arms scheme, while Switzerland offers free access to its market for all products to LDCs. Access to the Japanese market is also free for LDCs.

Effective 1 December 2024, China eliminated tariffs for goods imported from all of the countries that the United Nations categorizes as least developed and with which China has diplomatic relations. Thirty-three of the countries benefiting from the agreement are in Africa and the non-African countries receiving zero tariff treatment are Yemen, Kiribati, the Solomon Islands, Afghanistan, Bangladesh, Cambodia, Laos, Myanmar, Nepal, and East Timor.

== List of countries ==
The following 44 countries were listed as least developed countries by the UN as of December 2024: Afghanistan, Angola, Bangladesh, Benin, Burkina Faso, Burundi, Cambodia, Central African Republic, Chad, Comoros, Democratic Republic of the Congo, Djibouti, Eritrea, Ethiopia, Gambia, Guinea, Guinea-Bissau, Haiti, Kiribati, Laos, Lesotho, Liberia, Madagascar, Malawi, Mali, Mauritania, Mozambique, Myanmar, Nepal, Niger, Rwanda, Senegal, Sierra Leone, Solomon Islands, Somalia, South Sudan, Sudan, Tanzania, Timor-Leste, Togo, Tuvalu, Uganda, Yemen, and Zambia.

=== By continent or region ===
There are 32 countries that are classified as least developed countries in Africa, 8 in Asia, 3 in Oceania, and 1 in North America.

The list of "least developed countries" according to the United Nations with some that are categorized into the landlocked developing countries and the Small Island Developing States:

Africa

- Angola
- Benin
- Burkina Faso
- Burundi
- Central African Republic
- Chad
- Comoros
- D.R. Congo
- Djibouti
- Eritrea
- Ethiopia
- The Gambia
- Guinea
- Guinea-Bissau
- Lesotho
- Liberia
- Madagascar
- Malawi
- Mali
- Mauritania
- Mozambique
- Niger
- Rwanda
- Senegal
- Sierra Leone
- Somalia
- South Sudan
- Sudan
- Tanzania
- Togo
- Uganda
- Zambia

North America

- Haiti

Asia

- Afghanistan
- Bangladesh
- Cambodia
- Laos
- Myanmar
- Nepal
- Timor-Leste
- Yemen

Oceania

- Kiribati
- Solomon Islands
- Tuvalu

=== Delisted countries (graduated countries) ===
The three criteria (human assets, economic vulnerability and gross national income per capita) are assessed by the Committee for Development Policy every three years. Countries must meet at least two of the three criteria at two consecutive triennial reviews to be considered for graduation. On an exceptional basis, countries with a GNI per capita at least three times the regular income threshold may be eligible for graduation even if they do not meet the other two criteria. The Committee for Development Policy sends its recommendations for endorsement to the Economic and Social Council (ECOSOC).

After the initiation of the LDC category, eight countries graduated to developing country status. The first country to graduate from LDC status was Botswana in 1994. The second country was Cape Verde in 2007. Maldives graduated to developing country status at the beginning of 2011, Samoa in 2014, Equatorial Guinea in 2017, Vanuatu in December 2020, Bhutan in December 2023, and São Tomé and Príncipe in December 2024.

The following countries are no longer categorized in the "least developed countries" group:

- Sikkim (became a state within the Republic of India on 16 May 1975)
- Botswana (graduated from LDC status in December 1994)
- Cabo Verde (graduated in December 2007)
- Maldives (graduated in January 2011)
- Samoa (graduated in January 2014)
- Equatorial Guinea (graduated in June 2017)
- Vanuatu (graduated on 4 December 2020)
- Bhutan (graduated on 13 December 2023)
- São Tomé and Príncipe (graduated on 13 December 2024)

=== Countries expected to graduate soon ===
- Laos will graduate on 24 November 2026.
- Bangladesh met the criteria three times, the first one in 2018, the second in 2021 and the third in 2026. The country will graduate on 24 November 2029, after government request for deferral.
- Nepal will also graduate on 24 November 2029. The latter was originally selected to graduate to developing country status in 2018. However, the authorities of Nepal requested to postpone graduation until 2021. Graduation was later pushed back an additional five years.
- Solomon Islands was expected to graduate in 2024, but the preparatory period was extended by three years because of shocks that have severely disrupted the country's graduation process. The country will graduate on 13 December 2027.
- Cambodia is expected to graduate on 19 December 2029. It met the criteria in 2021 and was originally expected to graduate in 2027, but this was later postponed to ensure a smooth transition.
- Senegal will graduate on 19 December 2029.
- Djibouti, Kiribati and Tuvalu could graduate from LDC status on 13 December 2027 at the earliest.
- Comoros and Myanmar met the graduation criteria at least twice. They could be recommended for graduation in 2027.
- Rwanda, Uganda and Tanzania met the graduation criteria for the first time in 2024. They could be recommended for graduation in 2027.

=== Countries no longer expected to graduate ===
- Angola was expected to graduate in 2021, but the preparatory period was extended by three years because of the economic difficulties of the country and its dependence on commodities. Graduation was further postponed in December 2023, without any specific timeline. In 2024, the country no longer met the graduation criteria.
- Zambia and Timor-Leste met the graduation criteria in the past but no longer meet the qualification.

== See also ==
- Development geography – Branch of geography
- Development economics – Economics of developing economies
- Economic development – Process and policies to improve economic well-being
- Extreme poverty – Condition characterized by severe deprivation of basic human needs
- Failed state – State that has lost its ability to govern
- Fourth world – Extension of the three-world model
- Group of 77 – Coalition of developing countries
- Heavily indebted poor countries – IMF and World Bank classification for special eligibility
- Human Development Index – Composite statistic of life expectancy, education, and income indices
- Human Poverty Index – Former indication of the poverty of community in a country
- List of countries by GDP (PPP) per capita
- More developed country – Country with a developed economy and infrastructure (MDC), opposite of LDCs
- Newly industrialized country – Socioeconomic classification
- Right to development – Human right
