= Caroline Adoch =

Ugandan lawyer and human rights advocate

- Citizenship: Ugandan
- Education: St. Agnes Catholic Girl's Primary Boarding School Naggalama, St. Mary's Namagunga, University of Dar es Salaam, University of Cambridge, Makerere University
- Occupations: Lawyer and human rights advocate

Caroline Adoch is a Ugandan lawyer and human rights advocate. She is the first woman to hold a Doctorate of Law (LL.D) degree from Makerere University which was awarded to her on the 23rd May 2022.

== Education ==
Adoch attended St. Agnes Catholic Girl's Primary Boarding School Naggalama, where she attained her Primary Leaving Examination Certificate. She attended Mount St. Mary's Namagunga for both her O-level and A-level education. She attended the University of Dar es Salaam for her Bachelor's of Laws from 2004 to 2007, and attained her Master of Laws degree (LL.M.) in 2010 from the University of Cambridge in the United Kingdom after being awarded a Commonwealth Scholarship. She attained a Doctor of Laws (LL.D.) from Makerere University on the 23rd May 2022, making her the first woman to attain a Doctor of Laws (LL.D.) from the university.

Her doctoral thesis was titled Access to Gender Justice in Uganda: A Feminist Analysis of Experience of Rape victims in the Reporting and Prosecution Process, which Professor Sylvia Tamale supervised.

== Career ==
In 2012, Adoch joined Makerere University's School of Law as a teaching assistant. She later became an assistant lecturer at the same university where she lectured courses that included human rights, public internal law, administrative law and constitutional law. In March 2019, She became the senior associate at CivSource.
