= Stella Nansikombi Makubuya =

Ugandan lawyer

- Born: 11 November 1967; Uganda
- Died: 5 September 2018 (aged 50); Virginia, United States
- Citizenship: Uganda
- Education: Makerere University (Bachelor of Laws); Law Development Centre (Diploma in Legal Practice); University of Warwick (Master of Laws)
- Occupation: Human rights lawyer
- Years active: 1993 — 2018
- Known for: Legal expertise

Stella Nansikombi Mukasa Makubuya (née Stella Nansikombi), (11 November 1967 – 5 September 2018), was a Ugandan human-rights lawyer, and women's rights activist who served as the Regional Director for Africa at the International Center for Research on Women (ICRW).

== Early life and education ==
She was born to the late Dorcus Naluzze Mukasa and Peter Mukasa, on 11 November 1967, in the Buganda Region of Uganda. She attended Gayaza Junior School and then Gayaza High School, where she obtained her High School Diploma.

She was admitted to Makerere University Law School, where she graduated with a Bachelor of Laws degree. She went on to obtain a Diploma in Legal Practice, from the Law Development Centre, in Kampala, Uganda's capital city. She was then admitted to the Uganda Bar, as a practicing attorney. Later, she obtained a Master of Laws degree, from the University of Warwick, in the United Kingdom.

== Career ==
Stella Makubuya served as a legal officer in the Ugandan Ministry of Gender, Labour and Social Development. She then worked as Director, Manager and Consultant at Nordic Consulting Group Uganda.

She served as an advisor to several governments, national and international NGOs and development agencies, including Nnabagereka Development Foundation. She also served as Chair and Vice Chair on the boards of Akina Mama wa Afrika, International Federation of Women Lawyers (FIDA), ActionAid Uganda and Open Society Initiative for East Africa (OSIEA).

== Family ==
Stella Makubuya was married to Apollo Makubuya, a fellow lawyer and the chairman of Equity Bank Uganda Limited. Together, they are parents to three daughters (a) Athena Mulungi Nakku (b) Angela Kitiibwa Nakimuli and (c) Andrea Kwagalakwe Nabakka.

== Illness and death ==
On 5 September 2018, Stella Makubuya died in the State of Virginia, in the United States, where she was undergoing treatment for cancer, reported to be of the gall bladder.

== See also ==
- Apollo Makubuya
- Jacqueline Musiitwa
