= Sarah Ssali =

Ugandan academic and social scientist (born 1971)

- Born: 1971 (age 54–55); Uganda
- Citizenship: Ugandan
- Education: PhD
- Alma mater: Makerere University; Queen Margaret University
- Occupations: Social scientist, researcher lecturer
- Known for: Women's and Gender Studies
- Title: Deputy Vice Chancellor (Academic Affairs), Makerere University

Sarah Ssali (born 1971) is a Ugandan social scientist, researcher, and Professor of Gender and Development Studies at Makerere University. She is currently the Deputy Vice Chancellor (Academic Affairs) at Makerere University, becoming the second woman to hold this position in the university's history after Lillian Tibatemwa-Ekirikubinza.

== Early life and education ==
Ssali was born in Uganda. She holds a PhD in International Health Studies from Queen Margaret University, Edinburgh, a Master of Arts in Women's and Gender Studies, and a Bachelor of Arts in Social Sciences from Makerere University.

== Career ==
Sarah Ssali, whose academic work also appears under the name Sarah N. Ssali, is a Ugandan academic and Professor of Gender Studies at Makerere University. Her work focuses on gender, health systems, public policy, and the political economy of health. She has held several teaching, research, and administrative roles at Makerere University, where she has been a long-standing member of the School of Women and Gender Studies.

Through her career trajectory at Makerere, she served as a lecturer, senior lecturer, and associate professor before becoming a professor of gender studies. She also served as dean of the School of Women and Gender Studies, where she oversaw academic programs, research development, and administrative leadership within the school. She was the director of the Institute of Women and Gender Studies at Makerere University until her appointment as the deputy vice chancellor academic affairs.

Ssali's research centres on gendered dimensions of health systems, HIV/AIDS, reproductive health, and social policy, particularly in Uganda and in post-conflict or fragile settings. She has contributed to international collaborative research funded by institutions such the World Health Organisation, as well as serve on several governing and advisory boards.

On 23 September 2025, Ssali was appointed as the deputy vice chancellor academic affairs at Makerere University. The appointment was confirmed by Vice Chancellor Prof. Barnabas Nawangwe, who noted that she is the second woman to hold this position in the university's 100-year history following, Lillian Tibatemwa-Ekirikubinza.

== Appointment controversy ==
According to a report by the East African Centre for Investigative Reporting, some university sources alleged that the search process for the deputy vice chancellor (academic affairs) position was influenced to favour Ssali. The report also noted that a petition concerning the process was submitted to the Inspectorate of Government.

== Personal life ==
During her PhD studies at Queen Margaret University between 1999 and 2003, Ssali balanced academic work while raising a young child and arriving in Scotland pregnant, as she recalled in an interview with QMU.

== Selected publications ==
- Muttamba, W., Omongot, S., Najjingo, I., Nuwarinda, R., Buregyeya, E., Otmani del Barrio, M., Morgan, R., Kirenga, B., & Ssali, S. (2024). Using intersectional gender analysis to identify challenges in tuberculosis care at four health-care facilities in Uganda. *Infectious Diseases of Poverty*, 13(1), 2. https://doi.org/10.1186/s40249-023-01171-3
- Muttamba, W., Najjingo Omongot, I., Nuwarinda, R., Buregyeya, E., Del Barrio, M. O., Morgan, R., Kirenga, B., Ssali, S., et al. (2024). Using intersectional gender analysis to identify challenges in tuberculosis care at four health-care facilities in Uganda. Infectious Diseases of Poverty, 13(1). https://pmc.ncbi.nlm.nih.gov/articles/PMC10684070/
- Ssali, S. N. (2016). Using life histories to explore gendered experiences of conflict in Gulu District, northern Uganda: Implications for post-conflict health reconstruction. South African Review of Sociology, 47(1), 81–98. https://doi.org/10.1080/21528586.2015.1132634
- Ssetaala, A., Nabawanuka, J., Mpendo, J., Nanvubya, A., Sigirenda, S., Ssekubugu, R., Kiwanuka, N., & Ssali, S. N. (2018). Recruitment and retention strategies for women in community-based HIV prevention studies in Kenya and Uganda. BMC Medical Research Methodology, 18(1). https://pmc.ncbi.nlm.nih.gov/articles/PMC6116483/
- Tumwine, J. K., Achoki, R., ... Ssali, S. N., et al. (2012). Monitoring and improving quality of care for children in resource-poor settings: the Uganda experience. Archives of Disease in Childhood, 97(3), 260–265. https://pmc.ncbi.nlm.nih.gov/articles/PMC3480882/
- Ssali, S. N., Poland, F., & Seeley, J. (2013). Investigating social acceptability of biomedical HIV prevention: a qualitative study of views among communities and stakeholders in three African countries. BMC Public Health, 13, 119. https://pmc.ncbi.nlm.nih.gov/articles/PMC3826576/
- Ssali, S. N. (2006). Revisiting choice: gender, culture and privatised health care in Uganda. Agenda: Empowering Women for Gender Equity, 20(68), 42–53. https://www.jstor.org/stable/4066763

== See also ==
- Stella Nyanzi
- Sylvia Tamale
- Zahara Nampewo
- Lillian Tibatemwa-Ekirikubinza
