= Michael Battle =

Michael Battle may refer to:

- Michael A. Battle (attorney) (born 1955), American lawyer, director of the Executive Office for United States Attorneys
- Michael J. Battle (born 1963), American theologian and academic who worked with and was ordained by Desmond Tutu
- Michael Battle (diplomat) (born 1950), American diplomat, ambassador to the African Union, 2009–2013
