= Barbara Ntambirweki =

Ugandan lawyer, academic and activist

Barbara, Ntambirweki
- Born: 1981 (age 44–45); Fort Portal, Uganda
- Citizenship: Uganda
- Education: Makerere University (Bachelor of Laws); Law Development Centre (Diploma in Legal Practice); University of Cape Town (Master of Laws)
- Occupations: Lawyer, Academic & Activist
- Years active: 2005 – present
- Employer: Uganda Pentecostal University
- Known for: Academics, law, and activism
- Title: Lawyer and academic

Barbara Ntambirweki is a lawyer, academic, and activist in Uganda. She is a lecturer in the faculty of law at Uganda Pentecostal University, a private university.

== Background and education ==
Ntambirweki has a Bachelor of Laws degree from Makerere University, Uganda's oldest and largest public university. She also has a Diploma in Legal Practice from the Law Development Center. Her Master of Laws degree was obtained from the University of Cape Town in South Africa.

== Personal life ==
Ntambirweki was born in 1981 in Fort Portal District in Western Uganda to the late John Ntambirweki and Pelucy Kabahuma Akiiki.

== Career ==
She is a lecturer in the faculty of law at the Kampala campus of Uganda Pentecostal University. She also serves as an advocate in the law firm of Ntambirweki Kandeebe & Company Advocates, specializing in commercial transactions, litigation, and administrative law. She concurrently works as a research officer at the Advocates Coalition for Development and Environment of organization, where she "provides both research and administrative support to the various projects under the Programme".

In her personal writings, Ntambirweki recognizes the dominance of agriculture in the national economy. She argues that to maximize agricultural output, the application of science and technology is critically important. She has criticized the small funding by the Ugandan government of agricultural research.

== See also ==
- Sylvia Tamale
- Zahara Nampewo
- Judiciary of Uganda
- List of university leaders in Uganda
