= East African Development Bank =

Regional development finance institution in Kampala, Uganda

Coordinates: 00°18′54″N 32°34′48″E

- Type: Private
- Industry: Finance
- Founded: 1967; 59 years ago
- Headquarters: 4 Nile Avenue, Kampala, Uganda
- Key people: Yusuf Murangwa; Current Chairperson, Governing Council; Anne Juuko; Director General
- Products: Loans, leasing, real estate, trade finance, equity investments
- Revenue: ▲Aftertax:US$16,928,000 (2025)
- Total assets: $520,216,000 (2025)
- Owner: Governments of Kenya; Rwanda; Tanzania; Uganda; African Development Bank; NCBA Group Plc and others.
- Number of employees: 85 (2026)
- Website: www.eadb.org

The East African Development Bank (EADB) is a regional development finance institution located in Kampala, Uganda with the objective of promoting development in the member countries of the East African Community. The current member states of the EADB are Kenya, Uganda, Rwanda, and Tanzania including other development and commercial financial institutions. The bank was initiated in 1967 and has been in operation since the development of its charter.

== Overview ==
EADB plays a threefold role of lender, adviser, and development partner. The bank supports economic development in member states through short and long term lending of financially and sustainable projects. It provides a range of products and services that are tailored for the region's development requirements. The East African Development Bank also has experienced, financial backing, staff, and knowledge of the region's financial requirements. As of December 2025, the institution's total assets were valued at approximately $520,216,000. At that time, the shareholders' equity was valued at US$365,442.

== Mission and Vision ==
The East African Development bank aims to become the partner of choice in fostering sustainable socio-economic development. The bank's mission is to advance sustainable socio-economic developments in East Africa through offering financial solutions, advisory expertise, and supporting services.

== History ==
EADB was established in 1967 under the treaty of the then East African Cooperation between Kenya, Tanzania, and Uganda. Following the breakup of the first East African Community (EAC) in 1977, the bank was re-established under its own charter in 1980. In 2008, following the admission of Burundi and Rwanda into the new EAC, Rwanda applied and was admitted into the EADB. Under the new charter, the bank's role and mandate were reviewed, and its operational scope expanded. Under its expanded operational scope, the bank offers a broad range of financial services in the member states. Its main objective is to strengthen socio-economic development and regional integration.

== Ownership ==
The ownership of the EADB as of December 2022 is detailed in the table below.

East African Development Bank Stock Ownership
Rank	Name of Owner	Percentage Ownership
1	Government of Kenya	26.32
2	Government of Uganda	26.32
3	Government of Tanzania	26.32
4	Government of Rwanda	9.26
5	African Development Bank	8.6
6	Netherlands Development Finance Company	2.16
7	German Investment Corporation	0.58
8	Consortium of Yugoslav Institutions	0.19
9	SBIC - Africa Holdings	0.17
10	NCBA Group Plc - Nairobi	0.03
11	Nordea Bank - Sweden	0.03
12	Barclays Bank - London	0.01
13	Standard Chartered Bank - London	0.01
	Total	100.0

In December 2013, the bank's shareholders' equity totaled approximately US$166.03 million. In January 2013, the African Development Bank injected US$24 million into EADB in new equity, bringing its shareholding to 15 percent. As of December 2022, the EADB generated almost 6.6 million US$ in profit, while in 2021 it generated almost 7.9 million US$, having an 443 million US$ basic earnings per share. Moreover, the Bank's authorized share capital was 2.1 million US$ consisting of 160,000 shares with a par value of 13,500 US$ each.

== Bank structure ==
EADB's structure is composed of the following:

- Governing Council

The Governing Council of the East African Development Bank is composed of Ministers responsible for Finance from Member States. The council is considered the supreme governing body and meets regularly to review and analyze reports submitted by the Board of Directors.

- Advisory Panel

The Advisory Panel of the East African Development Bank is composed of distinguished individuals with extensive expertise in international and development financing. The panel also provides guidance to the Bank on the best effective strategies to achieve its goals and objectives.

- Board of Directors

The Board of Directors of the EADB holds all decision-making powers within the bank and meets at least quarterly to review and evaluate reports submitted by the Management.The board is composed of Permanent Secretaries from Ministries of Finance, private sectors representatives, and Director Generals from current member states.

- Management Team

The management Team is responsible for the day-to-day oversight of the risk management process, ensuring the effective implementation and ongoing integrity of the risk management system. this involves identifying and assessing risks while maintaining compliance with organized policies and objectives.

The details of the current structure of EADB are outlined on the bank's website.

== Leadership ==
Anne Juuko took over as the bank's Director General on October 2, 2026 following her appointment by the Governing Council. She took over from Bernard Mono, the bank's Senior Director, Finance and Treasury who served as the interim Director General from January 1, 2025 following Vivienne Yeda's retirement in December 2024.

== Awards ==
The EADB is the first regional bank to be established in Sub-Saharan Africa with its initiation in 1967. Moreover, in November 2014, the Association of African Development Finance Institutions ranked EADB, "the best performing development finance institution in Africa" for the second consecutive year, with an AA rating. The bank was ranked the best out of 33 institutions that submitted to the evaluation. In 2015, the East African Development Bank was the first East African institution to obtain an investment grade rating of Baa3 by Moody's Investors Services. Recently, the Bank was awarded by the ABA Best Development Bank award in 2018 and Bank of the Year Africa in 2021.

== Branch network ==
The headquarters of the bank are located in Uganda's capital, Kampala. As of December 2022, the East African Development Bank has three other registered offices and principal places of business, one each in the East African capitals of Nairobi, Kigali, and Dar-es-Salaam. A branch will be established in Bujumbura as soon as Burundi joins the bank.

== See also ==
- World Bank
- PTA Bank
- Rwanda Development Bank
- Uganda Development Bank
