= Ubuntu theology =

Theological concept of reconciliation in South Africa

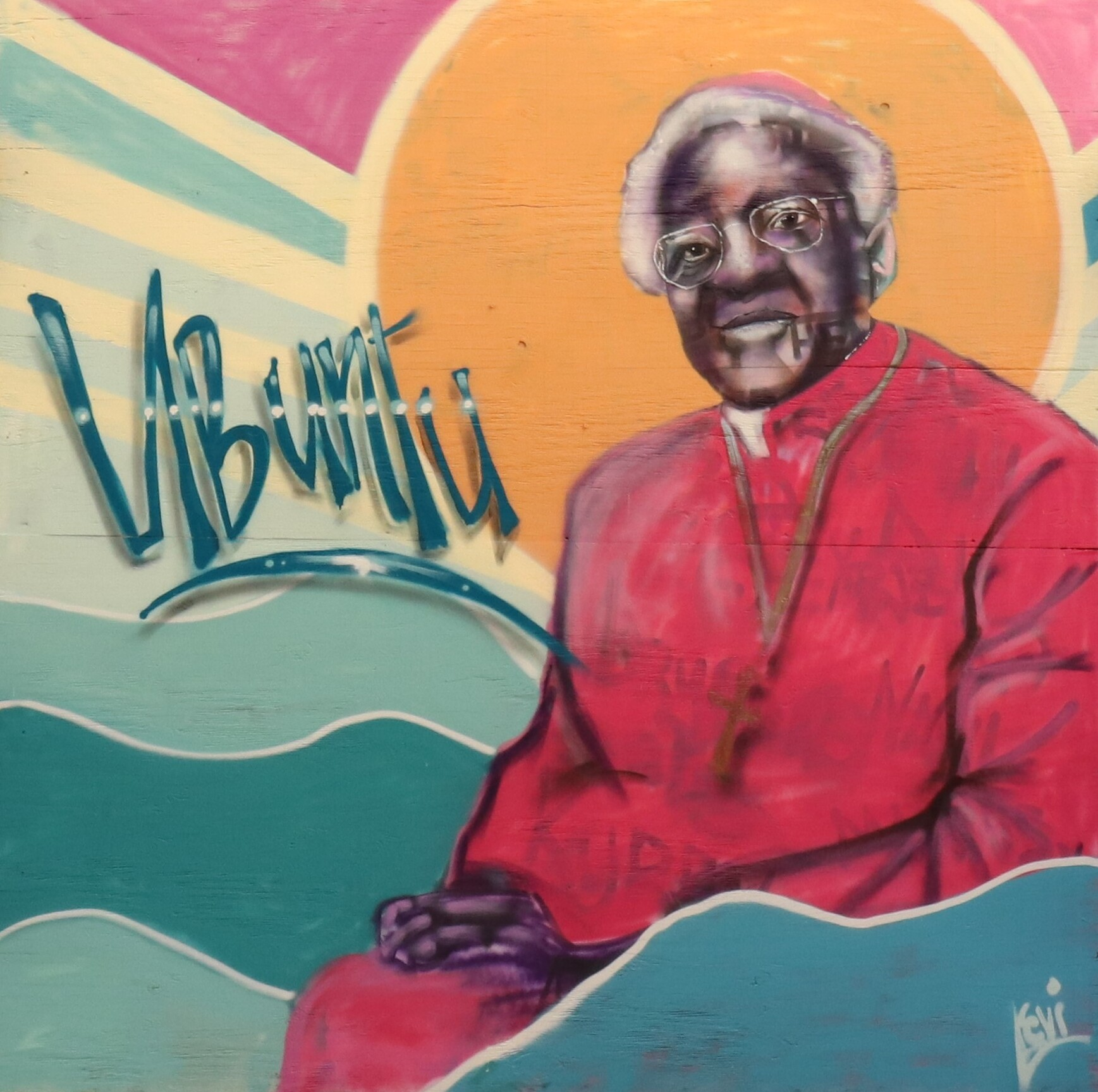
Painting of the Anglican Archbishop Desmond Tutu with the word "ubuntu"

Ubuntu theology is a Southern African Christian perception of the African Ubuntu philosophy which recognizes the humanity of a person through a person's relationship with other persons. It is best known through the writings of the Anglican archbishop Desmond Tutu, who, drawing from his Christian faith, theologized Ubuntu by a model of forgiveness in which human dignity and identity are drawn from the image of God. Human beings are called to be persons because they are created in the image of God.

== Background ==
The idea of Ubuntu has always existed in the oral cultures of Southern Africa, but there appears to be three significant developments in its application to the peoples of Southern Africa that have endeared it to the larger world. The first development may be traced to the emergence of the concept in print at about 1846, when the concept was adopted as a post-colonial term used in reference to the return of African dignity after the dehumanization by colonization. It became, then, a concept to affirm and assert the sense of peoplehood of Southern Africans in distinction from their colonial definitions and dehumanizations.

Although the term Ubuntu had long existed in the Zimbabwean context, a second phase of its development may be discerned in the 1990s when the term gained prominence in the midst of South Africa's transition from the apartheid regime to a more robust democracy that included all races. Siphamandla Zondi says the dictum "I am because you are" became the doctrine of Ubuntu that changed the political landscape of South Africa from colonial humanism of separate races unto a decolonized one based on the restoration of true humanism.

A third phase was a specifically theological one: it was the movement of Ubuntu from an African philosophy based on African values of community and kinship to Christian values and identity with the creator God. This move was significantly promoted by Desmond Tutu and other South African theologians in the context of South African recovery from the pains and brokenness of apartheid. These theologians anchored Ubuntu in the Christian ideals of forgiveness and reconciliation as gifts from God critical for peaceful communal co-existence.

Tutu, as chairperson of the Truth and Reconciliation Commission of South Africa between 1996 and 1998, and operating from the premise of faith, theologizes the Ubuntu concept by anchoring it beyond community into God through the biblical category of the imago Dei. Tutu sees all realms of life in relation to God and all humanity as created in the image of God. It reasons that an understanding of the createdness of all humans in God's image would lead to affirming the dignity of one another.

== Description ==
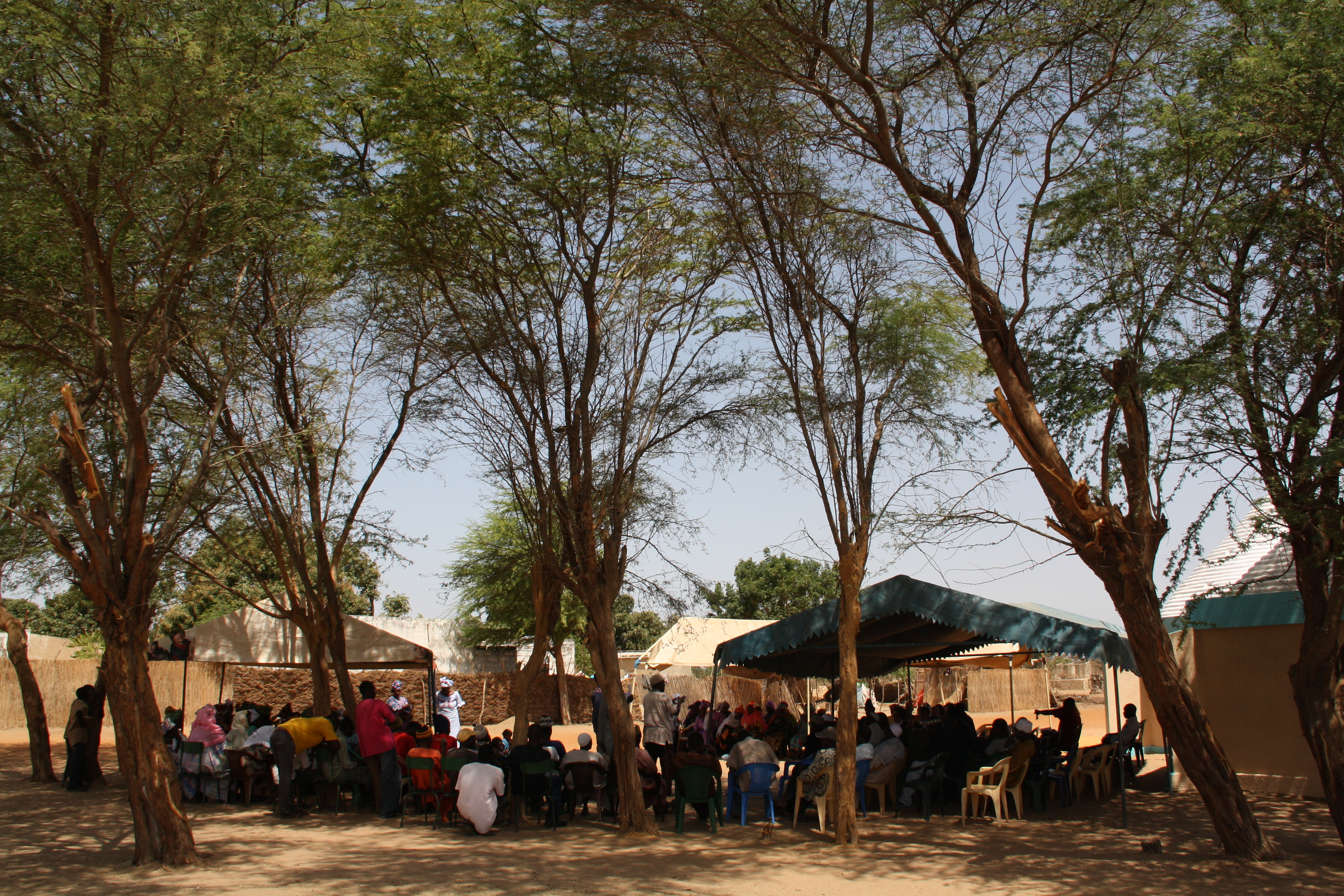
African village community

Desmond Tutu uses descriptive words to speak about Ubuntu intimately binding it within Christian principles of goodness. He describes the person true to Ubuntu as one who is "generous, hospitable, friendly, caring and compassionate." He says it as a state in which one's "humanity is caught up and inextricably bound up" in others. Tutu says of Ubuntu "I am human because I belong, I participate, I share." In this form, Tutu's use of Ubuntu is an "I am because we are" concept that encourages the person to the responsibilities of communal good and makes one find one's good only in the communal good.

The theology of Ubuntu is deeply embedded in African spirituality – a spirituality that is central to life and transforms all human relations. As Suzanne Membe-Metale affirms, Ubuntu is a spirituality that enables mutual sharing and satisfaction and is illustrated in the biblical account of the disciples sharing all they had with one another so that no one lacked anything (Acts 4:32–35).

Ubuntu theology affirms the interaction and relationship among persons in which everyone's humanness is recognized and affirmed. It is the philosophy of reconciliation and forgiveness that expresses "respect for a person's dignity irrespective of what that person has done." In this theology and ideology, Tutu seeks restorative justice over against retributive justice to give opportunity for the healing of both the oppressed and the oppressor as children of God.

== Theological basis ==
Ubuntu theology is based on inherent value for individuals and their relationships within communities, thus mixing African culture and biblical teaching. Faustin Ntamushobora holds that this sense of community is supported by Paul's explanation in 1 Corinthians 12:12–31, in which the apostle discusses unity in diversity.

Ubuntu promotes the idea that people are truly human only in communities in the full expression of the koinonia and finds the best manifestation of this in the church, which is the space in which life in relation to God and to one's neighbour is nourished by worship and fellowship.

Ubuntu recognizes the humanity of all as created in the image of God, thus making the imago Dei the essence of humanity's identity. The imago Dei foundation of Ubuntu determines humanity and denies any one or any institution the right to decide the superiority or inferiority of the other.

== Criticism ==
Michael Battle has argued that Ubuntu theology is too heavily based on the advocacy of the person of Desmond Tutu and the South African society. This is because Tutu's influence as a spiritual leader and chairperson of the Truth and Reconciliation Commission in South Africa gave him power to introduce and pursue an ideology that spoke to the good of both the black and white races.

Molly Manyonganise holds that, as originally developed, Ubuntu theology is not gender inclusive. As an ideology that is gaining wide African acceptability, theologians have expressed concern at the lack of gender inclusivity in the discourse of Ubuntu especially with the patriarchal societies of Africa where the identity of a person is determined by the male.

John W. de Gruchy has stated that Ubuntu theology is chiefly ecclesio-centric in that the church is seen as the only place for nurture and flourishing of communal relations. In this position, Ubuntu is seen not to sufficiently integrate the totality and diversity of creation.

Neville Curle has stated that There are many definitions of Ubuntu. All of them point to the humanity required from the individual and the recognition of the other person’s being. Few refer to the voluntary nature of that humanity and recognition, nor do they expand the horizons to include not only one’s produce, but one’s productive assets; even one’s life. For uBuntu to be Ubuntu, the freewill offering of that love for one’s fellow man or woman is paramount—‘This is how we know what love is. Jesus Christ laid down his life for us. And we ought to lay down our lives for our brothers and sisters’ (1 John 3:16).

Moreover, Ubuntu theology speaks specifically to the multi-racial reconciliation of the South African challenges. In this way, it is a purely contextual theology. For while restorative justice may work within the South African context, there are concerns as to whether justice is fundamentally achieved if issues are not adequately discussed.
