= Anne Juuko =

Ugandan investment banker and corporate executive

- Born: 1981 (age 44–45); Uganda
- Education: Makerere University (Bachelor of Commerce); Heriot-Watt University (Master of Strategic Planning)
- Occupations: Banker and corporate executive
- Years active: Since 2001
- Title: Director General of East African Development Bank

Anne Juuko (born c. 1981) is a Ugandan investment banker and corporate executive. She is the director general of the East African Development Bank (EADB) since 2 October 2026. Her position is located in Kampala, Uganda. Prior to that, she was the regional head of global markets in Standard Bank Group's Eastern African region, covering South Sudan, the Democratic Republic of the Congo, Uganda, Kenya, Tanzania, Malawi and Zambia. Her appointment took effect on 1 April 2024. Her position was located in Nairobi, Kenya. Before that, from 1 March 2020 until 31 March 2024, she was the managing director and CEO of Stanbic Bank Uganda Limited, the largest commercial bank in the country, by assets, valued at US$1.6 billion as of June 2019. She took up this appointment on 1 March 2020.

== Background and education ==
Juuko was born in the Central Region of Uganda in the 1980s. She attended local primary and secondary schools, before being admitted to Makerere University, Uganda's largest and oldest public university. She graduated with a Bachelor of Commerce degree from there. Her second degree, a Master of Strategic Planning, was obtained from Heriot-Watt University Business School, in Edinburgh, Scotland, United Kingdom. Juuko has also completed various professional courses and programmes in leadership and management.

== Career ==
Juuko started her banking career in 2001. For a period in the 2000s, she served as vice president and head of Fixed Income, Currencies and Commodities at Citibank Uganda Limited. She was then transferred to Citibank Kenya Limited, serving there as vice president, Customer Sales and Derivatives Marketing, for two years, from June 2010 until June 2012.

In 2012, she was hired by Standard Bank Group, as head of Global Markets for Stanbic Bank Uganda, serving in that capacity until December 2017. In January 2018, she took up a new appointment as head of Corporate and Investment Banking at Standard Bank Namibia, a role she served in until February 2020.

On 1 March 2020, Juuko replaced Patrick Mweheire, as CEO of Stanbic Bank Uganda, becoming the first female Ugandan to serve in this position. She resigned from the Standard Bank Group on 30 November 2025. On 2 October 2026, she was appointed directior general of the East African Development Bank.

== Awards and honors ==
As head of Global Markets, at Stanbic Bank Uganda, Juuko won the Primary Dealer of the Year award for six consecutive years.

== Family ==
Juuko is married to lawyer Apollo Makubuya, a partner at MMAKS Advocates, a commercial law firm in Kampala, Uganda.
