= Lillian Tibatemwa-Ekirikubinza =

Ugandan lawyer, academic and judge

- Born: 1961 (age 64–65); Iganga District, Uganda
- Citizenship: Uganda
- Education: Makerere University (Bachelor of Laws); Law Development Centre ( Diploma in Legal Practice); University of Bristol (Master of Laws); University of Copenhagen (Doctor of Philosophy)
- Occupations: Lawyer, judge
- Years active: 1986 — present
- Title: Justice of the Supreme Court of Uganda
- Spouse: Paul Ekirikubinza

Lillian Tibatemwa-Ekirikubinza is a Ugandan lawyer, academic and judge, who has served as a Justice of the Supreme Court of Uganda, since 2015.

== Background and education ==
She was born in present-day Iganga District in 1961. She studied at Gayaza High School in the 1970s and law at Makerere University, in Kampala, Uganda, graduating with a Bachelor of Laws. She also holds a Diploma in Legal Practice, awarded by the Law Development Centre, also in Kampala.

Her Master of Laws in commercial law, was obtained from the University of Bristol in the United Kingdom. She also has a Doctor of Philosophy in law, obtained from the University of Copenhagen in Denmark.

== Career ==
Tibatemwa-Ekirikubinza served as a lecturer then associate professor and then professor of law at Makerere University. Following that, she was promoted to the rank of Deputy Vice-Chancellor responsible for academic affairs at the institution. For a period of six months, from April 2009 until October 2009 she served as the Acting Vice Chancellor of Makerere University. In 2013, she was appointed to the Uganda Court of Appeal, serving in that capacity until 2015, when she was appointed to the Supreme Court. She was elected to the International Commission of jurists for a five-year term.

Justice Tibatemwa-Ekirikubinza was one of the justices of the Constitutional Court, who ruled in a 4 to 1 majority, that "there is no single provision in the Constitution that provides for the re-appointment of a retired Chief Justice". She wrote the majority opinion in that ruling. That court's ruling made Justice Benjamin Odoki ineligible to return as Chief Justice, since he had attained the mandatory retirement age of 70.

== Other considerations ==
She is a Fellow of the Uganda National Academy of Sciences and an alumnus of the International Women's Leadership Forum. Lillian Tibatemwa-Ekirikubinza has been married to Paul Ekirikubinza, a civil engineer for over 20 years and together are the parents of three sons.

== Scholarly work ==
Professor Tibatemwa-Ekirikubinza has extensively engaged in academic and policy impact research in areas of Criminal Law and Criminology, Children's Rights, Juvenile Justice, Gender and Women's Rights – areas in which she is also widely published. Her work ingeniously links the Law with the socio-economic and cultural milieu, offering an invaluable critique of the law from “a lived reality” perspective. More recently, she has engaged in research on Quality Assurance in Institutions of Higher Learning. Through her research she has published several books and in several Journals and Her interest and scholarly contribution largely lie in the areas of Comparative Criminal Jurisprudence; Transnational Crime; Computer Crime; Human Rights Perspectives of Criminal Law; Gender, Crime and Criminology; Gender and the Law; Children's Rights; Juvenile Justice; Rights of People with Disability; Legal aspects of Information and Communications Technology (ICT); E-Commerce, E-Evidence and Computer Crime.

=== Articles ===
Multiple Partnering, Gender Relations and Violence by Women in Uganda published in 1998 by the East African Journal of Peace and Human Rights volume 4 issue 1 pages 15–40. Property Rights, Institutional Credit and Gender in Uganda published in 1995 by the East African Journal of Peace and Human Rights volume 2 issue 1 pages 68–80 The Judiciary and Enforcement of Human Rights: Between Judicial Activism and Judicial Restraint published in 2002 by the East African Journal of Peace and Human Rights volume 8 issue 2 pages 145–173. Family Relations and the Law in Uganda: Insights into Current Issues published in 2002 in Int'l Surv. Fam. L page 433. Juvenile Justice and the Law in Uganda: Towards Restorative Justice published in 2003 in Human Rights in Development Online volume 9 issue 1 pages 293–346. Understanding Children's Rights: The Case of Corporal Punishment in Rural Uganda published in 2003 in East African Journal of Peace and Human Rights Volume 9 issue 1.

=== Books ===
More Sinned against Than Sinning: Women's Violent Crime in Uganda. Ph.D. dissertation: Kriminalistik Institut, Kobenhavn, Denmark in 1995. Women's Violent Crime in Uganda: More Sinned against than Sinning published in 1999 by Fountain publishers. Criminal Law in Uganda. Sexual Assaults and Offences Against Morality published in 2005 by Fountain publishers. Offences against the person: Homicides and Non-fatal Assaults in Uganda published in 2005 by Fountain publishers. Judicial Bench Book on Violence Against Women in Commonwealth East Africa published by the Commonwealth Secretariat in 2016. A Comparative Review of Presidential Election Court Decisions in East Africa. With F. Ssempebwa, E. Munuo, and Busingye Kabumba published by Fountain publishers in 2016.

== Milestones ==
Justice Lillian Tibatemwa-Ekirikubinza is a lady of many firsts that include the following;

- First East African female to graduate with a PhD in law
- First female to become full Professor of Law in the East African region
- First female appointed Deputy Vice-Chancellor of Makerere University in Uganda

== See also ==
- Government of Uganda
- Judiciary of Uganda
- Uganda Law Society
- Makerere University
- Sarah Ssali
