= Spyros Kouvelis =

Greek Senior Sustainability Expert and former Minister

Spyros Kouvelis MP

Minister of State for Foreign Economic, Environmental and Cultural Affairs of Greece
- In office October 2009 – June 2011
- President: Karolos Papoulias
- Prime Minister: George Papandreou

Personal details
- Born: 1964 (age 61–62) Athens, Greece
- Education: National and Kapodistrian University of Athens, University of Reading
- Profession: Economist

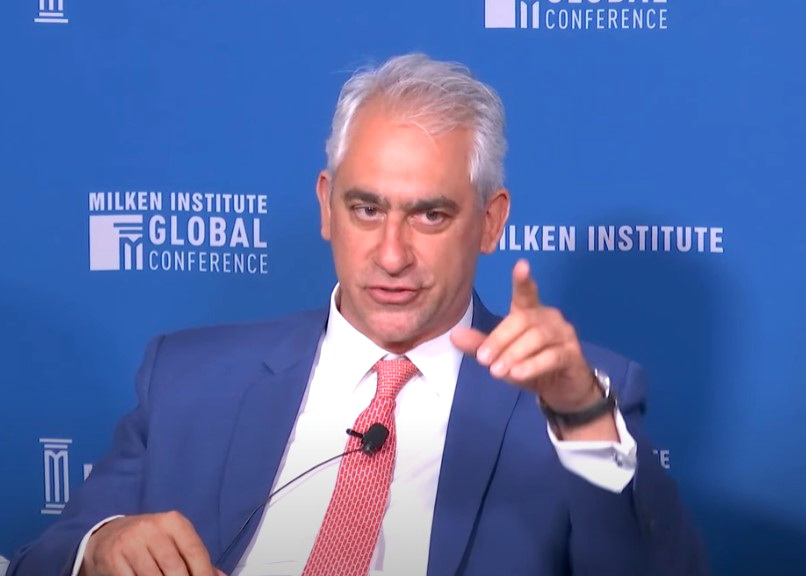

Spyros Kouvelis (Greek: Σπύρος Κουβέλης) is a Greek Senior Sustainability Expert, Former Politician and Economist who served as Minister of State (Υφυπουργός) for Foreign Economic, Environmental and Cultural Affairs of the Ministry of Foreign Affairs of Greece.

== Birthplace and Education ==
Spyros Kouvelis was born in 1964 in Athens, Greece. His origin is from Sitia in Crete, and Andirrio in Aetoloakarnania.

Spyros has a BSc Degree in Economics from the Law and Economics School of the National and Kapodistrian University of Athens and a Masters of Science in Environmental and Agricultural Economics from the University of Reading, in Berkshire, U.K. He is fluent in Greek, English, and French, and also speaks Italian and Spanish.

== Politics ==
Spyros started his involvement in politics in 1996, when he was appointed as Advisor to the Deputy Minister of Environment, Planning and Public Works of Greece, a post that he held until 2001, advising on Environmental Protection, Nature, Water Management and coordination with Civil Society and NGOs.

He was elected twice as Member of the Hellenic Parliament with the Panhellenic Socialist Movement, for his First Term as MP of State in the National Elections of September 2007, and re-elected for his Second Term as MP of A' Athens Constituency in the 2009 Greek legislative election and was appointed by the Prime Minister as a Minister of State for Foreign Economic, Environmental and Cultural Affairs. His responsibilities included Economic and Green Diplomacy, Development Cooperation, and Cultural Affairs, and has contributed significantly in strengthening Economic Diplomacy in Greece and the presence of Greece in Global Environmental Conventions.

In 2012, with his letter to the Party President and the Speaker of the Hellenic Parliament he announced that he is becoming an Independent MP and did not run in the 2012 election, choosing to end his MP tenure.

== Work before politics ==
After a short period of Business Management and Finance with Coopers and Lybrand and Unilever he joined the World Wide Fund for Nature (WWF) as a Conservation Director in 1991. From 1995 until 1997 he acted as CEO a.i. as a member of the Management Team directing the organization. Spyros was chair of the WWF Mediterranean Team, member of the WWF Agriculture Team and member of the WWF European Policy Team, and an Advisor of the WWF European Policy Office in Brussels.

Since 2001, he held the position of MedWet Coordinator, directing the Mediterranean Wetlands Initiative Unit in Athens, the Ramsar Convention Regional Programme responsible for the implementation of the Convention for the entire Mediterranean region, covering 15 countries.

He was president of the International Film and Visual Arts Festival of Rhodes – Ecofilms from 2001 until 2007.

In May 2007 he joined the Mediterranean Action Plan of the United Nations Environment Programme, as officer in charge of the Mediterranean Commission on Sustainable Development and the implementation of the Mediterranean Strategy for Sustainable Development.

== Work after politics on Sustainable development ==
Spyros focused on Sustainable Development throughout his entire career since 1991.

After leaving politics in 2012, he worked closely with the Mediterranean Action Plan of the United Nations Environment Programme (UNEP/MAP), acting as Senior Expert and head of the Experts Team for the development of the 2nd Edition of the Mediterranean Strategy for Sustainable Development (MSSD) and the Action Plan for Sustainable Consumption and Production (SCP).

He also played a leading role in the team of experts that developed and applied the Simplified Peer Review Methodology (SIMPEER) for the implementation of the Sustainable Development Strategy in Albania, Egypt, France, Montenegro, Morocco and Tunisia.

In 2014 he established BabylonGardens an innovation lab for Green Technologies in Urban Spaces. BabylonGardens portofolio of technologies includes solutions for green walls, green roofs and urban spaces, specially designed to cater for the needs of the Mediterranean region. Spyros holds two patents for technologies that he developed for minimum-weight Green Roofs, and for Green Walls made by reusing large quantities for plastic bottles.

In 2017 he established the joint initiative on Sustainable Development and Governance between the Cambridge Institute for Sustainability Leadership (CISL) – of the University of Cambridge, and the European Public Law Organization (EPLO), an International Organization with Permanent Observer status at the UN General Assembly.

The programme was transformed into the Institute for Sustainable Development of EPLO in 2019, of which he is the Director.

He is a Senior Associate of the Cambridge Institute for Sustainability Leadership since 2018.

In 2018 he co-founded Verimpact.com, a specialised Data Analytics and Non-Financial Risk management tech company, working with clients globally on improving sustainability performance and minimizing Environmental, Social, and Governance risks. Verimpact is also running the Verimpact Academy providing training and knowledge to its global community.

Since 2022 Spyros is Board Member of the EU Commission Restore our Ocean and Waters Mission, aiming to protect and restore the health of the ocean and waters through research and innovation, citizen engagement and blue investments.

Since 2023, he is the Team Leader of the EU-GCC Cooperation on Green Transition project, established by the European External Action Service and funded by the EU Foreign Policy Instrument. The project focuses on promoting Green Transition and cooperation on Decarbonisation, Renewable Energy, Energy Efficiency, Green hydrogen and Climate change adaptation between the European Union, and Bahrain, Kuwait, Oman, Qatar, Saudi Arabia, and the UAE.

in 2025 Spyros was appointed as Ambassador of the European Public Law Organization to the Gulf Cooperation Council and the Gulf region.

== Personal life ==
Spyros is married with Christina Deligianni and has two daughters, Nausica and Alexandra.
