= Stephan Klasen =

German economist

Stephan Johannes Klasen (18 June 1966 – 27 October 2020) was a German development economist and professor of economics at the University of Göttingen. He was also director of the Ibero-America Institute for Economic Research and founder of the Courant Research Center "Poverty, Inequality, and Growth in Developing and Transition Countries". He was a member of the UN Committee on Development Policy, president of the European Development Research Network, and a member of the Intergovernmental Panel on Climate Change for the 5th Assessment Report.

== Early life and career ==
Klasen was born in Trier, Germany, where he first attended the Humboldt-Gymnasium (then Hindenburg-Gymnasium) in Trier. From 1983 to 1985 he attended the Armand Hammer United World College in New Mexico, where he completed his International Baccalaureate. He then did his community service in the care of the severely disabled in Germany.

Klasen obtained his B.A. in economics from Harvard College from 1987 to 1991, and his Ph.D. in economics from 1991 to 1994 from Harvard University under the supervision of Nobel Laureate Amartya Sen, with the topic of an economic analysis of gender inequality in intra-household resource allocation in 18th and 19th century Europe and in contemporary developing countries.

After completing his dissertation, Klasen began working as an economist at the World Bank in Washington, D.C. in 1994. In 1995, he moved to Johannesburg to begin work as a consultant to the South African government and supervisor of the Lesotho Highlands Water Project. From 1996 to 1998, he worked as a research associate and deputy director in the Center for History and Economics at the University of Cambridge. From 1998 to 2003, he worked at LMU Munich as Professor of Economics. Since 2003, he has worked at the University of Göttingen as a professor of economics. There, Klasen was additionally Dean of the Faculty of Economics from 2007 to 2008.

In addition to these activities, Klasen has worked for various organizations, mostly in an advisory role, such as the World Bank, DFID, UNDP, IPCC, BMZ, OECD, UNESCO, KfW and FAO.

In 2016, he received the Special Award of the board of trustees of the University of Göttingen for the development of development economics in Göttingen.

Klasen was awarded an honorary doctorate by the Jaume I University in 2018.

He fell ill with amyothrophic lateral sclerosis (ALS) in 2015, which caused him to retire early. As part of his farewell lecture, his contribution to the establishment of development economics in Göttingen was acknowledged. The University of Göttingen established the "Stephan Klasen Fellowship" in his honor, which allows two postdocs from low- or middle-income countries to study at the University of Göttingen for one year.

Klasen was married and had four children. He died in Göttingen on October 27, 2020.

== Publications (selection) ==
- Poverty Measurement. Edited Volume. Cheltenham, Edward Elgar (2018).
- Vulnerability to Poverty: Theory, Measurement and Determinants, with case studies from Thailand and Vietnam. Edited with Hermann Waibel, London: Palgrave (2013).
- Absolute Poverty and Global Justice. Edited with Mack, E., M. Schramm, and T. Pogge. London: Ashgate (2009).
- Poverty, Inequality and Policy in Latin America. With Felicitas Nowak-Lehmann. Part of CESifo Conference Series. Cambridge MA:MIT Press (2009).
- Poverty, Inequality and Migration in Latin America. With Felicitas Nowak-Lehmann. Hamburg: Peter Lang Verlag (2008).
- Determinants of Pro-Poor Growth: Analytical Issues and Findings from Country Cases. With Andy McKay and Michael Grimm. London: Palgrave (2007).
- Amartya Sen: Perspectives on the Economic and Human Development of India and China. Edited with Isabel Günther. Göttingen: Universitätsverlag (2006).
- Perspectives on Endangerment. With Graham Huggan. Hannover: Ohlms-Verlag (2005).
- Common Security and Civil Society in Africa. With L. Wohlgemuth, S. Gibson and E. Rothschild. Uppsala:NAI (1999).
