= Busingye Kabumba =

Ugandan lawyer and poet (born 1982)

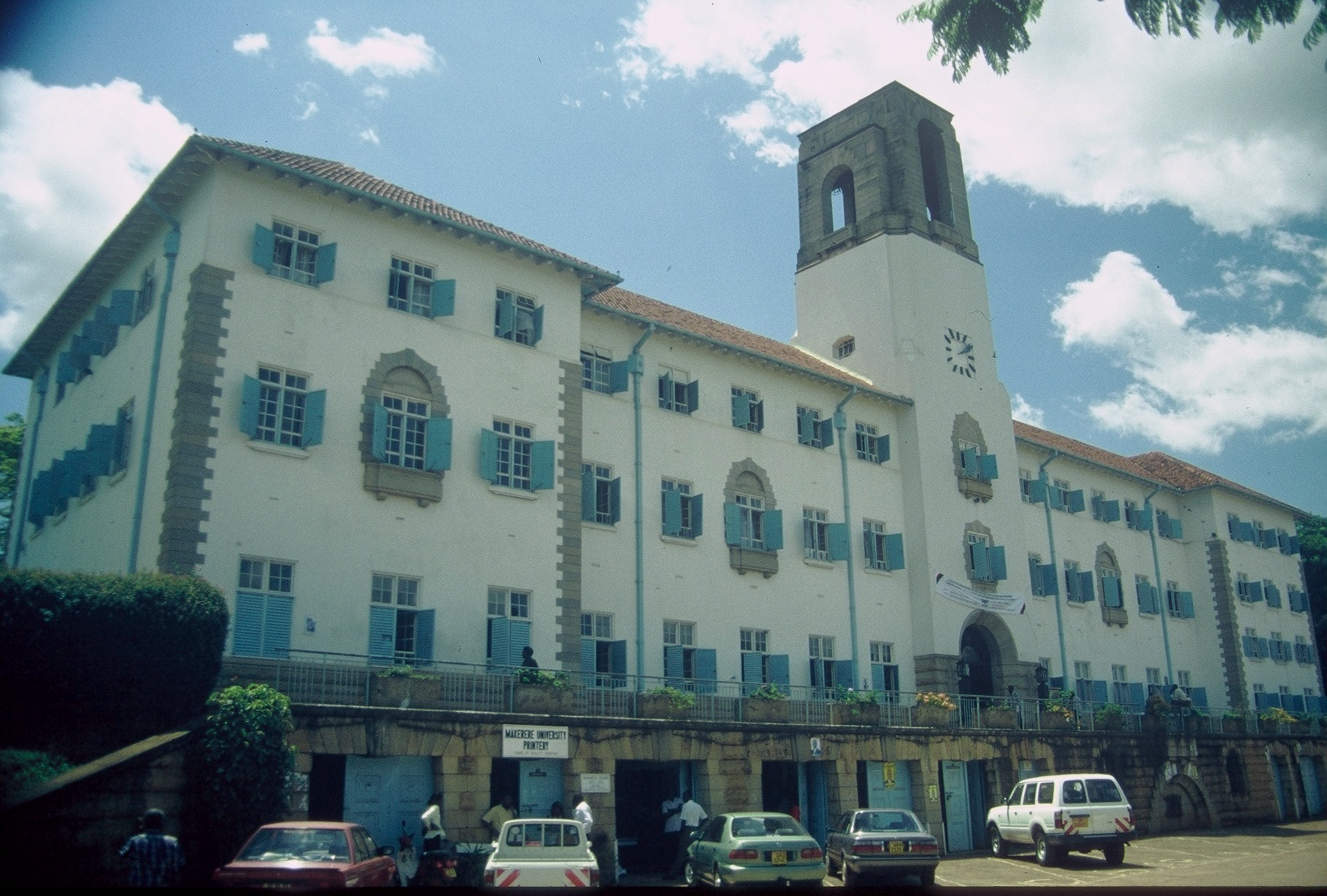
- Born: Busingye Kabumba; 21 June 1982 (age 44); Uganda
- Education: Harvard University, Namilyango college
- Occupations: Lawyer, academic, writer
- Writing career
- Genre: Poetry

Busingye Kabumba (born 21 June 1982) is a Ugandan lawyer and poet. He is a Lecturer-in-Law, Human Rights and Peace Centre (HURIPEC), at the Faculty of Law, Makerere University and a Consulting Partner with M/S Development Law Associates. His poetry collection, "Whispers of My Soul", won first prize in the published works category at the National Book Trust of Uganda (NABOTU) awards of 2002. The publication of this book in 2001 when he was 19 years old made him the youngest Ugandan poet ever to publish a whole collection of poetry.

== Early life and education ==
Kabumba was born on June 21, 1982, to Professor Ijuka Kabumba and Mrs Bazaire Kabumba, who are both teachers. He is the fourth in a family of five. He went to St Kizito primary school, Namilyango college for his "O" levels and King's College Budo for his "A" levels. He graduated with an LL.B from Makerere University. After graduating from the Law Development Centre with a post-graduate diploma in legal practice in July 2006, Busingye studied a bachelor of civil law degree at University of Oxford. He later did a master of laws Harvard University.

== Published works ==
- Whispers of My Soul. Nyonyi Publishing Company. 2001.
