= Sylvia Tamale =

Ugandan academic and activist

Professor Sylvia Tamale
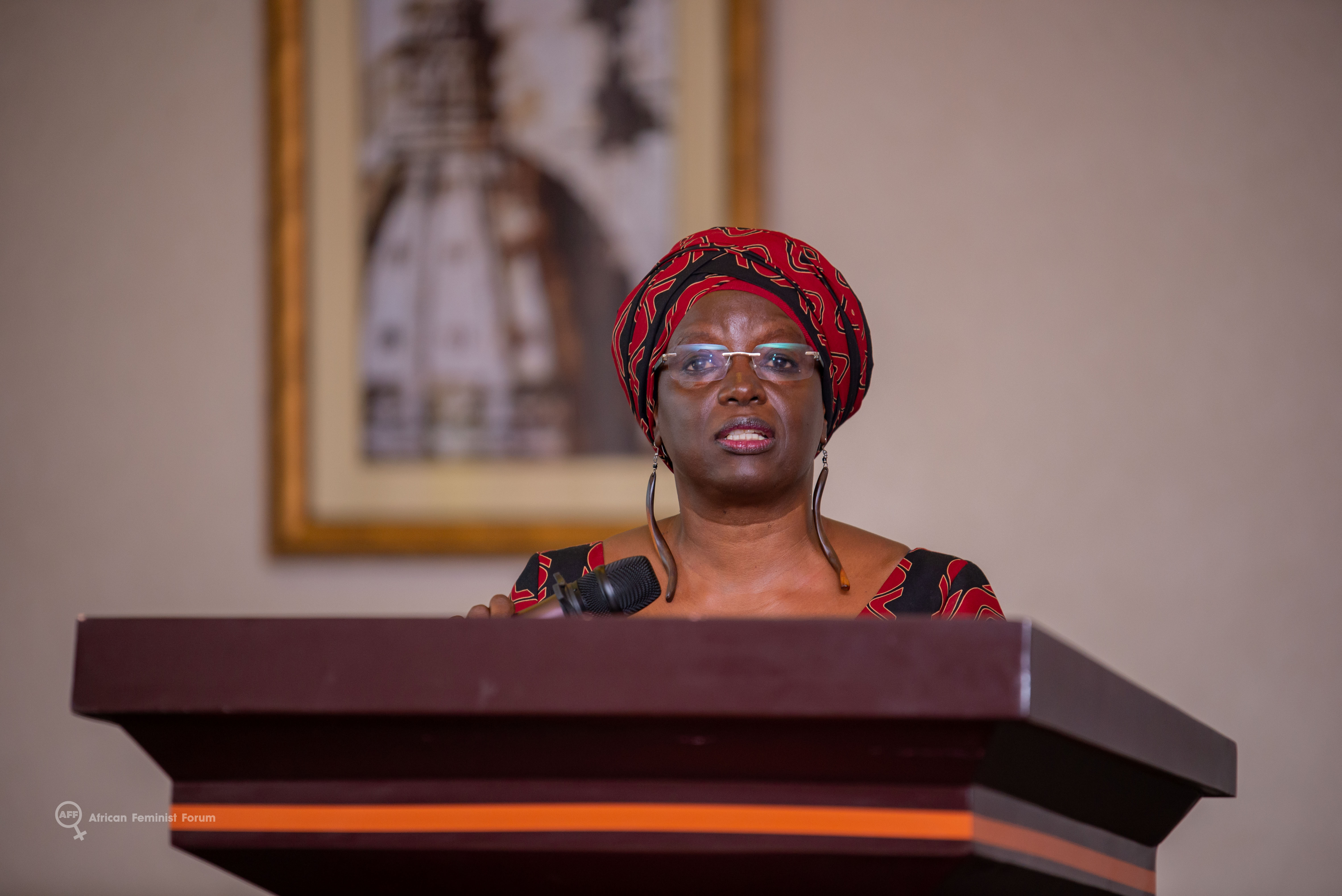
- Tamale at Kampala's 2022 African Feminist Forum, delivering a keynote on "Decolonizing Knowledge Production"
- Born: Sylvia Tamale; 1962 (age 63–64); Uganda
- Education: Makerere University (Bachelor of Laws); Law Development Centre (Diploma in Legal Practice); Harvard University (Master of Laws); University of Minnesota (Doctor of Philosophy in Sociology)
- Occupations: Lawyer, academic, and activist
- Years active: 1987 – present

Sylvia Rosila Tamale is a Ugandan academic, and human rights activist in Uganda. She was the first female dean in the law faculty at Makerere University, Uganda.

== Education ==
Tamale received her bachelor of Laws with honors from Makerere University, her master of Laws from Harvard Law School, and her doctor of Philosophy in sociology and feminist studies from the University of Minnesota in 1997. Tamale received her Diploma in Legal Practice from the Law Development Center, Kampala, in 1990, graduating at the top of her class. She retired in April 2022, at 63 years after serving for 37 years at Makerere University in the faculty of Law.

== Academic career ==
Tamale has been a visiting professor at the African Gender Institute of the University of Cape Town and a visiting scholar at the University of Wisconsin-Madison. In 2003 she was condemned by Ugandan conservatives for proposing that gay men and lesbians be included in the definition of "minority". Tamale was the dean of the Faculty of Law and Jurisprudence at Makerere University in Kampala, Uganda, from 2004 to 2008.

== Awards and honours ==
From 1993 until 1997, she received a Fulbright-MacArthur Scholarship to pursue her studies at the University of Minnesota. In 2003, she won the University of Minnesota Award for International Distinguished Leadership for her work at the university. In 2004, she was awarded the Akina Mama wa Afrika Award by Akina Mama wa Afrika, an international, Pan-African, non-governmental development organisation for African women based in the United Kingdom with its African headquarters in Kampala, Uganda. In 2004, she was recognized by several women's organisations in Uganda for her for human rights activism.

On 28 October 2016, she became the first female lecturer to give a professorial inaugural lecture at Makerere University. Her lecture was entitled Nudity, Protests and the Law, inspired, in part, by the earlier-in-the-year nude protest of Stella Nyanzi at the university. In her speech, Tamale called for a revision of the Ugandan laws that discriminate against women.

== Sexual harassment activism ==
In March 2018, Makerere University selected Dr Tamale to chair a select five member committee to investigate the causes and increasing cases of "sexual harassment" at the public institution of higher learning. The report of the committee is expected in May 2018. As Dean of Faculty at Makerere University, she started the Sexual Harassment Policy, which prohibits sexual harassment on and off campus among anyone associated with the university.

On May 18, 2018, Tamale presented the first report on sexual harassment that the select committee had investigated. She presented the research to students, staff, and public and private partners of Makerere University. The research was conducted using qualitative methods, consisting of 234 interviews, with 59% of the interviewees being women. She noted the importance of the media within her speech as it was instrumental in "creating a spotlight on the evils of sexual harassment hence increasing the awareness on the issue." Makerere University now reaffirms its zero tolerance policy for sexual harassment and is committed to creating an environment that respects all its member rights.

She has spoken out in support of the traditional practice of labia stretching, arguing that any comparison to female genital mutilation is invalid.

== Global feminism ==
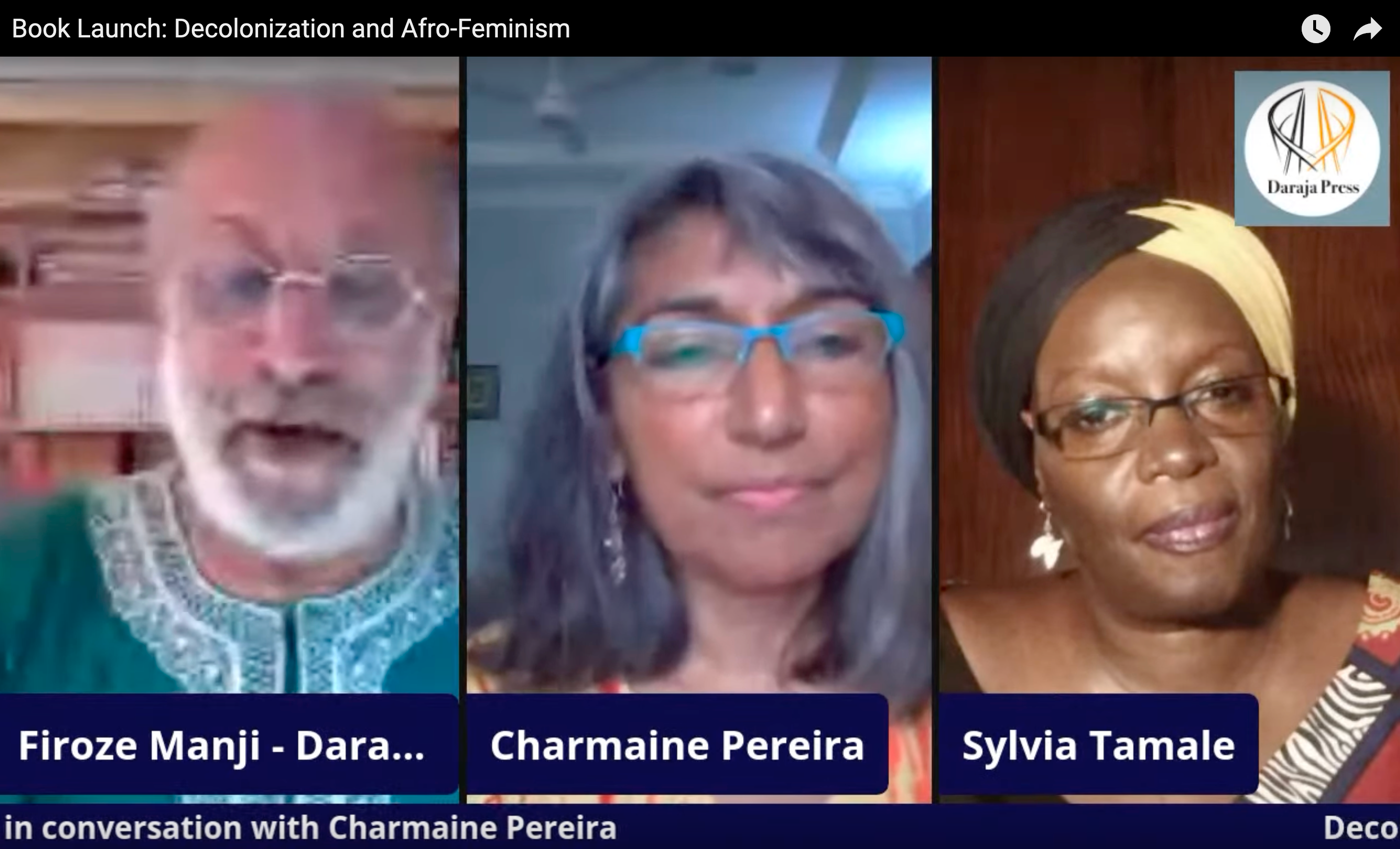
Firoze Manji, Charmaine Pereira, and Tamale in conversation at the book launch of Decolonization and Afro-Feminism, 2020

Tamale's research includes work on gender and sexuality, women in politics, and feminist jurisprudence, third world women and the law, all while combining academia and activism. To her, feminism is "a belief/ideology in gender equity and doing something about it and overall about people's dignity and humanity." She encourages other feminists to actively participate in all levels of public offices and use education as a weapon to destroy various patriarchal structures of power within law, culture, language and media. She believes in the inclusivity of feminism by stating, "patriarchy hurts men too," and "we must recognize that not all women are the same. Not all women experience oppression the same way."

She also includes religion within her inclusivity sentiments, stating, "you can be religious and feminist. There is a whole body of literature on interpreting the Bible to bring about gender equity."

In 2003, Tamale was named the "Worst Woman of the Year" by a conservative bloc in Uganda. She was vilified for weeks within one of Kampala's daily newspapers, New Vision, as responsible for everything from the moral degeneration of the nation to the reason Ugandan teenagers were going to go to hell. She was attacked for suggesting that the term "minorities" should cover lesbian and gay citizens of Uganda in the Equal Opportunities Commission.

She is a Working Group Member in the African Feminist Forum. The AFF brings African feminist activists to discuss strategy, refine approaches, and develop stronger networks to advance women's rights in Africa. She is an Advisory Board Member for the Open Society Foundations, an organization active in more than 120 countries that provides grants to individuals and groups toward building inclusive and vibrant democracies.

== Above the Parapet ==
Tamale was interviewed by Dr. Purna Sen, Director of Policy at UN Women, for part of a research project called Above the Parapet. For this project, high-profile women who have had an impact on public life were interviewed in order to capture their views and experiences. The Sylvia Tamale interview was uploaded to YouTube on August 13, 2015, by London School of Economics and Political Science (LSE). Tamale talks about using Makerere University as a platform to get her message out there and her views on politics and the law, among many other topics. Speaking about her work, Tamale says, "I'm really not doing it for my colleagues. I'm doing it for the betterment of our society." Tamale also speaks about being attacked for being vocal about taboo subjects such as abortion. She also speaks about being named the Worst Woman of the Year. "The reason why I was the worst woman that year was...because of my speaking out...always talking about issues that was seen as against African tradition...against religion...I even made a button that says 'Worst Woman 2003' and I wear it with a lot of pride," Tamale said. Tamale also offered advice to any women aspiring to be in a position of power. "The world will try as much as possible to define who you are. Don't let the world define who you are. Define who you are yourself. Never ever shrink to fit the expectations of others. That pressure will always be there," Tamale said, "You cannot get any rewards without working for it. Nothing good comes easy."

== Personal life ==
She is married to Joe Oloka-Onyango a professor of law at Makerere University.

== Publications ==
- Decolonization and Afro-Feminism (2020)
- When Hens Begin To Crow: Gender and Parliamentary Politics in Uganda (1999)
- "African Feminism: How Should We Change?" (2006)
- "The Right to Culture and the culture of rights: A critical perspective on women's sexual rights in Africa" in Feminist Legal Studies: Vol 16 (2006)
- Eroticism, Sensuality, and 'Women's Secrets' Among the Baganda'" in the IDS Bulletin: Vol 37 (2009)
- African Sexualities: A Reader (2011)
- "Confronting the Politics of Nonconforming Sexualities in Africa" in the African Studies Review: Vol 56 (2013)
- "Exploring the Contour of African Sexualities: Religion, Law and Power" in the African Human Rights Law Journal: Vol 14. (2014)
- Researching and theorising sexualities in Africa
- Out of the closet: Unveiling sexuality discourses in Uganda
- Gender trauma in Africa: enhancing women's links to resources
- 'Point of order, Mr Speaker': African women claiming their space in parliament
- A human rights impact assessment of the Ugandan Anti-homosexuality Bill 2009.
- Homosexuality: perspectives from Uganda
- Nudity, protest and the law in Uganda
- Paradoxes of sex work and sexuality in modern-day Uganda
- Bitches at the academy: Gender and academic freedom at the African university
- Introducing quotas: discourse and legal reform in Uganda
- Profile:'keep your eyes off my thighs': a feminist analysis of Uganda's 'miniskirt law'
- The Personal is Political," or Why Women's Rights are Indeed Human Rights: An African Perspective on International Feminism
- How Old is Old Enough? Defilement Law and the Age of Consent in Uganda
- The outsider looks in: Constructing knowledge about American collegiate racism
- Think globally, act locally: using international treaties for women's empowerment in East Africa
- A human rights impact assessment of the anti-homosexuality bill
- Taking the beast by its horns: Formal resistance to women's oppression in Africa
- Legal Voice: Challenges and Prospects in the Documentation of African legal feminism
- Law reform and women's rights in Uganda
- Controlling Women's Fertility in Uganda
- Research on gender and sexualities in Africa
- Gender, economies and entitlements in Africa
- The limitation of affirmative action in Uganda
- Methodologies in Caribbean Research on Gender and Sexuality, by Kamala Kempadoo and Halimah AF DeShong (eds)
- Crossing the bright red line: The abuse of culture and religion to violate women's sexual and reproductive health rights in Uganda

== See also ==
- Sarah Ssali
- Barbara Ntambirweki
- Zahara Nampewo
- Samallie Kiyingi
