= Trade and Development Bank =

Trade and development financial institution operating in eastern and southern Africa

Eastern and Southern African Trade and Development Bank
- Type: Treaty-based multilateral institution
- Industry: Finance
- Founded: 1985
- Headquarters: Chaussée Prince Louis; Rwagasore; Bujumbura, Burundi
- Key people: Juste Rwamabuga (Chairman) Admassu Yilma Tadesse (President & CEO) Joy Ntare (Chief Risk Officer) David Bamlango (General Counsel) Michael Awori (Chief Operating Officer)
- Products: International trade and development finance
- Revenue: ▲ Net US$129+ million (2018)
- Total assets: US$8 billion (2022)
- Owner: African Member States, African and non-African institutional investors, and non-African States
- Website: www.tdbgroup.org

The Trade and Development Bank (TDB), formerly the PTA Bank, is a trade and development financial institution operating in eastern and southern Africa. TDB is the financial arm of the Common Market for Eastern and Southern Africa (COMESA), although membership is open to non-COMESA states and other institutional shareholders.

== Overview ==
As of December 2018, TDB was a large financial institution with assets exceeding US$5.56 billion. The bank had 38 shareholders, across two classes of shares, with shareholders' equity in excess of US$1.19 billion.

== History ==
The Eastern and Southern African Trade and Development Bank, also known as TDB, was established on 6 November 1985 under Chapter Nine of the Treaty for the Establishment of the Preferential Trade Area for Eastern and Southern African States, which entered into effect on 2 September 1982 and was subsequently replaced by the Treaty for the Establishment of the Common Market for Eastern and Southern Africa of 1994 that established COMESA. TDB is the financial arm of COMESA.

== Shareholders ==
The membership of the TDB includes twenty-two member states, nineteen of which are COMESA members. The People's Republic of China was the first non-regional member state to join TDB in 2000. The African Development Bank (AfDB) is a major institutional shareholder, alongside eleven other institutional investors, including the Arab Bank for Economic Development in Africa (BADEA) and OPEC Fund (The OPEC Fund for International Development).

The following countries are the African member states of TDB.

- Burundi
- Comoros
- Democratic Republic of the Congo
- Djibouti
- Egypt
- Eritrea
- Eswatini
- Ethiopia
- Kenya
- Madagascar
- Malawi
- Mauritius
- Mozambique
- Rwanda
- Seychelles
- Somalia
- South Sudan
- Sudan
- Tanzania
- Uganda
- Zambia
- Zimbabwe

== Location ==
The headquarters of TDB are in Bujumbura, Burundi and Ebene, Mauritius. The bank also maintains regional offices in Nairobi, Kenya, Harare, Zimbabwe, Addis Ababa, Ethiopia, and Kinshasa, Democratic Republic of Congo. The Nairobi office serves as both the primary operating hub for TDB and the regional office for Eastern Africa. In June 2022, TDB moved into a new 19-storey skyscraper in the Kilimani neighborhood of Nairobi, that serves as the bank's regional headquarters of the bank's eastern region.

== Board of governors ==
The Board of Governors is the supreme authority of TDB. It is composed of shareholder representatives, with each shareholder designating one representative and one alternate.

== Board of directors ==
The board of directors is responsible for the conduct of the general operations of TDB. As of October 2026, the following were the members of the board of directors.

- Armando Emmanuel – Chairman and Director
- Admassu Tadesse, Co-Chairman and Executive Director
- Abdel-Rahman Taha -Director
- George Tongesai Guvamatanga - Director
- Dingxin Gao – Director
- Vineeh Rambarassah - Director
- Bussirou Sarr – Director
- Lekar Nair – Director
- Solomon Quaynor – Director representing the AfDB
- Abraham Akoi Diing Nyuon - Director

== Management team ==
As of March 2019, the bank's chief executive officer was assisted by 17 senior managers in running the bank.

== Credit rating ==
In October 2017, the long-term issuer rating of TDB was upgraded to "Baa3" from "Ba1" by Moody's Investors Service. In October 2019, Fitch Ratings affirmed the Long-term Issuer Default Rating of TDB at "BB+" with Stable Outlook.

== See also ==
- Caribbean Development Bank
- East African Development Bank
