= Uganda Pentecostal University =

Private university in Uganda

Uganda Pentecostal University (UPU)
- Motto: Fortis et Libre
- Type: Private
- Established: 2001
- Chancellor: Justice Hon. Ruby Aweri Opio
- Vice-Chancellor: Professor John Ntambirweki
- Students: 1000 (2021)
- Location: Fort Portal, Uganda; 00°39′44″N 30°15′58″E
- Campus: Urban
- Website: www.upu.ac.ug
- Location in Uganda

Uganda Pentecostal University (UPU) is a private university in Uganda.

== Location ==
The Uganda Pentecostal University is located in the heart of Kabarole District, Fort Portal City, Uganda. It originated from the Grotius School of Law and Professional Studies, which started in February 2001. UPU is a private institution licensed by the National Council for Higher Education (NCHE). Fort Portal, Kabarole District, in Western Uganda, approximately 320 kilometres (200 mi), by road, west of Kampala, Uganda's capital city. This location is approximately 1 kilometre (0.6 mi), Kasese road at Muchwa Complex. The coordinates of the main campus are:0°39'44.0"N, 30°15'58.0"E (Latitude:0.662222; Longitude:30.266111).

== Overview ==
The university started operating in 2001 as the Grotius School of Law and Professional Studies, with a campus in Mengo, a neighborhood in Lubaga Division in western Kampala, Uganda's capital city. The school initially operated as part of another university. In 2004, the school was advised by the Uganda National Council for Higher Education (UNCHE) to apply for a separate license. After disagreements between the university and UNCHE were settled in court, the UNHCE licensed the university on 9 August 2005.

== See also ==
- Education in Uganda
- Fort Portal
- Western Region, Uganda
- List of universities in Uganda
- List of university leaders
