= Michael J. Battle =

American academic

The Very Reverend Michael Battle
- Born: Michael Jesse Battle; December 12, 1963; New Orleans
- Occupation: Moral theologian
- Spouse: Raquel

Academic background
- Education: Duke University
- Influences: Desmond Tutu

Academic work
- Institutions: Duke Divinity School; University of the South; General Theological Seminary
- Main interests: Christian spirituality; Reconciliation theology

Michael Jesse Battle (born 12 December 1963) is an Episcopal moral theologian known for his works on spirituality, reconciliation, and the thought of Desmond Tutu.

== Biography ==
Born in New Orleans, Battle received a B.A. in 1986 from Duke University, an M.Div. in 1989 from Princeton Theological Seminary, a S.T.M. in 1991 from Yale University, and a Ph.D. in 1995 in theology and ethics from Duke University.

In 1993, Battle was ordained a priest by Desmond Tutu in St. George's Cathedral, Cape Town. He worked as vicar at St. Titus Episcopal Church in Durham, NC, rector of Church of Our Savior in San Gabriel, California, and rector of St. Ambrose Episcopal Church, Raleigh, NC. In 2007, he was made provost of Cathedral Center of St. Paul, Los Angeles and Canon theologian of the Episcopal Diocese of Los Angeles.

Battle has held a number of academic posts, teaching spiritual theology, moral theology, and black church studies at Duke Divinity School and the University of the South (now known as Sewanee: The University of the South). He is currently Herbert Thompson Professor of Church and Society and Director of the Desmond Tutu Center at General Theological Seminary, New York.

Battle and his wife Raquel have three children, Sage, Bliss and Zion.

== Works ==
- Battle, Michael (1997). Reconciliation: The Ubuntu Theology of Desmond Tutu. Pilgrim Press. ISBN 9780829811582.
- Battle, Michael, ed. (1998). The Wisdom of Desmond Tutu. Lion. ISBN 9780745939957.
- Battle, Michael (2004). Blessed are the Peacemakers: A Christian Spirituality of Nonviolence. Mercer University Press. ISBN 9780865548718.
- Campolo, Tony; Battle, Michael (2005). The Church Enslaved: A Spirituality of Racial Reconciliation. Fortress Press. ISBN 9781451414646.
- Battle, Michael (2009). Ubuntu: I in You and You in Me. Church Publishing, Inc. ISBN 9781596271111.
- Battle, Michael (2017). Heaven on Earth: God's Call to Community in the Book of Revelation. Westminster John Knox Press. ISBN 9781611647945.

== See also ==
- Ubuntu theology
- Reconciliation theology
