= Harvey Sindima =

Harvey J Sindima is a Malawian theologian, philosopher, professor and author. He has written extensively on matters of African philosophy, religious ethics and spirituality. He is the original voice behind the Malawian philosophy of personhood: "umunthu". He also works on independent charity project called Blantyre North Relief Project (BNRP) in Blantyre, Malawi with his wife Gertrude Sindima.

As part of the BNRP, Harvey and Gertrude Sindima have built an independent university, Sindima Memorial Institute. It is a liberal arts university with a great emphasis in the fields of medicine, science, arts and technology. It is built solidly on the foundations of "umunthu."

He received a CTS at the Church of Central Africa Presbyterian Theological College in 1976. He attended the CPS New College and University of Edinburgh well. He received a master's degree in divinity from the International Theological Center in 1982 and a PhD at Princeton Theological Seminary in 1988. He currently teaches at Colgate University.

== Books ==
- The Gospel According to the Marginalized - 2010
- Introduction to Religious Studies - 2009
- Reclaiming Christianity in the 21st. Century: Building a Spiritual Powerhouse - 2007
- The Gospel According to John: A Devotional Commentary - 2006
- Africa's Agenda: The Legacy of Liberalism and Colonialism in the Crisis of African Values (Contributions in Afro-American and African Studies: Contemporary Black Poets)- 2005
- The Gospel According to the Marginalized (Martin Luther King Jr. Memorial Studies in Religion, Culture, and Social Development; Vol. 6) - 2005
- Malawi's First Republic: An Economic and Political Analysis - 2002
- Religious and Political Ethics in Africa: A Moral Inquiry (Contributions in Afro-American and African Studies)- 1998
- Drums of Redemption: An Introduction to African Christianity (Contributions to the Study of Religion)- 1994
- The Legacy of Scottish Missionaries in Malawi (Studies in the History of Missions) - 1992

Chapters:

- Education and Independence: Education in South Africa, 1658-1988 (Contributions in Afro-American and African Studies: Contemporary Black Poets) by Simphiwe A. Hlatshwayo-2000
- Major Issues in Islam: The Challenges Within and Without. Lanham, MD: Hamilton Books. 2018 ISBN 9780761870166.
