= John Ntambirweki =

Ugandan lawyer and academic

- Born: 1955 (age 70–71)- Uganda
- Died: 12 April 2023; Uganda
- Citizenship: Uganda
- Education: Makerere University (Bachelor of Laws); Law Development Centre (Diploma in Legal Practice); University of Nairobi (Master of Laws)
- Occupations: Lawyer & Academic Administrator
- Years active: 1965 — present
- Known for: Law & Academic Administration

Professor John Ntambirweki was a lawyer, academic and academic administrator in Uganda, the third-largest economy in the East African Community. He was the Vice Chancellor of Uganda Pentecostal University, a private university, which was accredited by the Uganda National Council for Higher Education in 2005.

== Other considerations ==
John Ntambirweki was a Consultant at Ntambirweki, Kandeebe & Company Advocates, based in Kampala. Other advocates at this firm include his daughter, Barbara Ntambirweki, also a Senior Lecturer in the Faculty of Law at Uganda Pentecostal University.

== See also ==
- List of Universities in Uganda
- List of university leaders in Uganda
- List of business schools in Uganda
- Kabarole District
