= Zahara Nampewo =

Ugandan lawyer, human rights activist, and academic

Doctor Zahara Nampewo
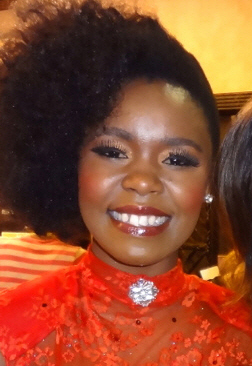
- Born: Uganda
- Citizenship: Uganda
- Education: Makerere University (Bachelor of Laws); Law Development Centre (Diploma in Legal Practice); Abo Akademi University (Diploma in Human Rights Protection); University of Nottingham (Master of Laws); Emory University (Doctor of Juridical Science)
- Occupations: Lawyer, academic and human rights activist
- Years active: 2006–present
- Known for: Law and human rights
- Title: Executive director of the Human Rights and Peace Centre (HURIPEC) at Makerere University School of Law

Dr. Zahara Nampewo is a Ugandan lawyer, human rights activist, and academic. She is the executive director of the Human Rights and Peace Centre (HURIPEC) at Makerere University School of Law, in Kampala, Uganda's capital and largest city.

== Background and education ==
Nampewo has a long list of academic qualifications both in the law and in the human rights arenas. She holds a Bachelor of Laws from Makerere University, in Kampala, Uganda's capital and largest city. She also holds a Diploma in Legal Practice, obtained from the Law Development Centre, also in Kampala.

Her Advanced Diploma in Human Rights Protection was obtained from Abo Akademi University, in Turku, Finland. She also has a Master of Laws degree in human rights, awarded by the University of Nottingham in the United Kingdom. Her Doctor of Juridical Science degree was obtained from Emory University in Atlanta, Georgia, United States.

== Career ==
Prior to joining the Makerere University faculty in 2006, she worked as a senior legal officer with the Foundation for Human Rights Initiative (FHRI), a human rights advocacy non-profit organisation, based in Nsambya, a neighborhood within Kampala. She also worked as a specialist in gender-based justice at the United Nations Development Fund for Women, in Liberia. Immediately before joining Makerere, she worked for the Danish International Development Agency (DANIDA), as a coordinator of their Access to Justice programme.

At Makerere University, Nampewo teaches law and heads the Human Rights and Peace Centre (HURIPEC), a semi-autonomous department under the School of Law. She specializes in human rights and gender rights and teaches Conflict Resolution, International Humanitarian Law, Gender Law, Health Law, and Family Law. She has published considerably in peer journals on the subject and on related topics.

== Other considerations ==
Nampewo is a director at the Governance and Public Policy Research Center, a think tank, based in Kampala, Uganda. She is also a board chairperson at Chapter Four Uganda and Uganda Lawyers for Human Rights (ULHR)
