= Diploma in Professional Legal Practice =

Scottish postgraduate qualification

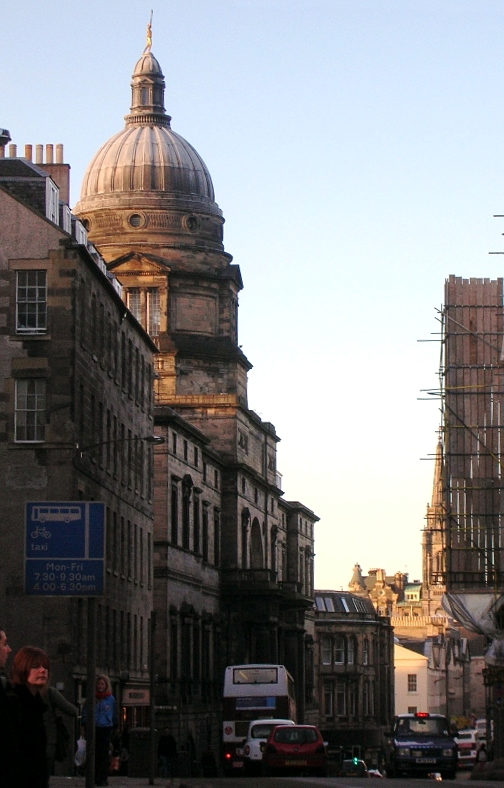
Old College, home to the Edinburgh School of Law

The Diploma in Legal Practice (from its introduction in 1980 until 2012/13) or Diploma in Professional Legal Practice (from 2012/13) is a Scottish postgraduate qualification required in order to practise law in Scotland, as either a solicitor or an advocate. It is undertaken after completing undergraduate study and before commencing a traineeship.

The course is intended to provide students with the more practical skills they will require after academic study, comprising compulsory modules in conveyancing, civil court practice, criminal court practice, private client, financial services and related skills, accountancy and professional responsibility, with a choice of either company and commercial or public administration.

Until the start of the 2012/13 academic year, the Diploma attracted a quota of funded places from the Student Awards Agency for Scotland (SAAS), set at three hundred. The funding extended to a contribution of around £3,000 towards fees and a means-tested subsistence allowance. Fees for the Diploma range from £6,630 - £7,700.

From 2012/13, as part of a wider review of funding for postgraduate courses, the Scottish Government announced changes to the way in which postgraduate courses would be funded, including the Diploma, which became the Diploma in Professional Legal Practice. Since the change students may apply to SAAS for a loan (£3,400 as of 2014) towards the cost of tuition. There was considerable criticism of the postgraduate funding, in particular that the changes made did not do enough to widen access to the Scottish legal profession.

== Providers ==
As of 2014 the Diploma was offered at:

- University of Aberdeen
- University of Dundee
- University of Edinburgh
- University of Glasgow
- Robert Gordon University
- University of Strathclyde

The University of Stirling stopped offering the course from the start of the 2012/13 academic year
