= Ajna Jusić =

Bosnian child rights advocate

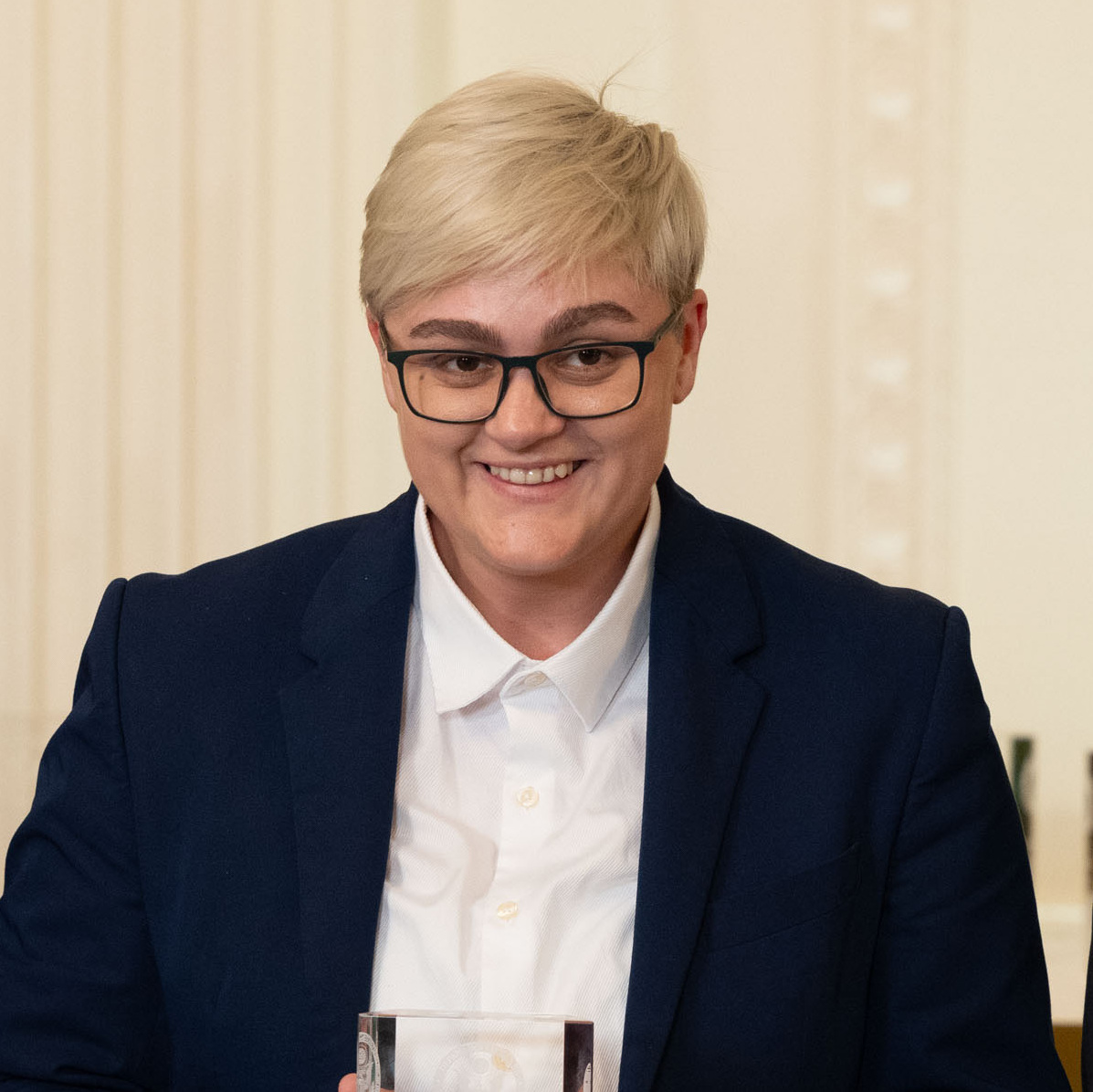
- Jusić in 2024
- Born: 1993 (age 32–33); Zenica, Bosnia and Herzegovina
- Known for: supporting children born as a result of wartime rape

Ajna Jusić is a Bosnia and Herzegovina advocate for children, like herself, who were born after rape during war. She founded an organisation, Forgotten Children of War, and both she and the organisation have won awards.

== Life ==
Jusić was born in 1993 in Zenica. Her mother was one of tens of thousands of women who were raped during the Yugoslav Wars and Jusić was one of the 4,000 children who resulted from those war crimes. She was born in a safe house established by Medica mondiale and Monika Hauser and she was photographed in Monika's arms. Her mother did not tell her about her origins, and she found out about what had happened to her at 15 when trying to identify her father.

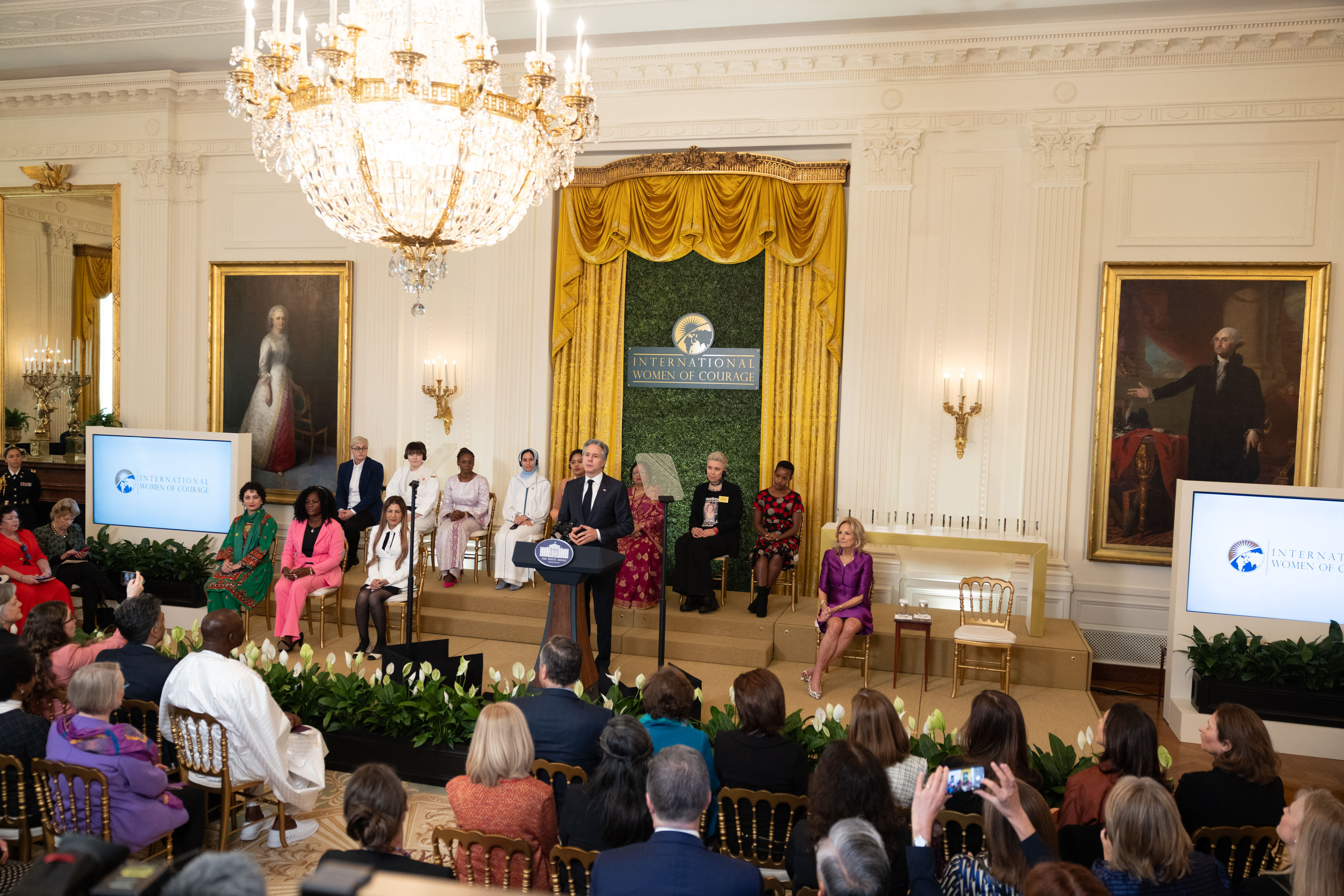
Awardees: (Back row) Jusić at far left, Rina Gonoi, Fatou Baldeh, Rabha El Haymar, Myintzu Win, Fawzia Karim Firoze, Volha Harbunova, Agather Atuhaire. Front row to left: Fariba Balouch, Fátima Corozo, Benafsha Yaqoobi

Twenty-five years after she was born, she met Monika Hauser in Sarajevo. She had decided that she needed to speak about the circumstances of her birth. Her mother and step-father were supportive but worried about the public reaction. Jusić was frequently asked about the name of her father by officials - she wanted to change the law.

She founded an organisation named Forgotten Children of War which was given an award for its work. In 2023 the organisation was given the ICIP Peace in Progress Award. The organisation's campaigning has resulted in changes to the law in Bosnia and Herzegovina which means that children, like herself, who were born as the result of rape are treated equally under the law. The ICIP award was also given to the Association of Women Victims of War (Udruženje Žena žrtva rata) which is a related organisation founded in 2004 that is also concerned about bringing the war rapists to justice. In 2024 she was in Washington where she was recognised as an International Woman of Courage on 4 March. After the IWOC ceremony the awardees were invited to take part in the State department's International Visitor Leadership Program where they meet each other and others interested in their work.
