= Fawzia Karim Firoze =

Bangladeshi advocate

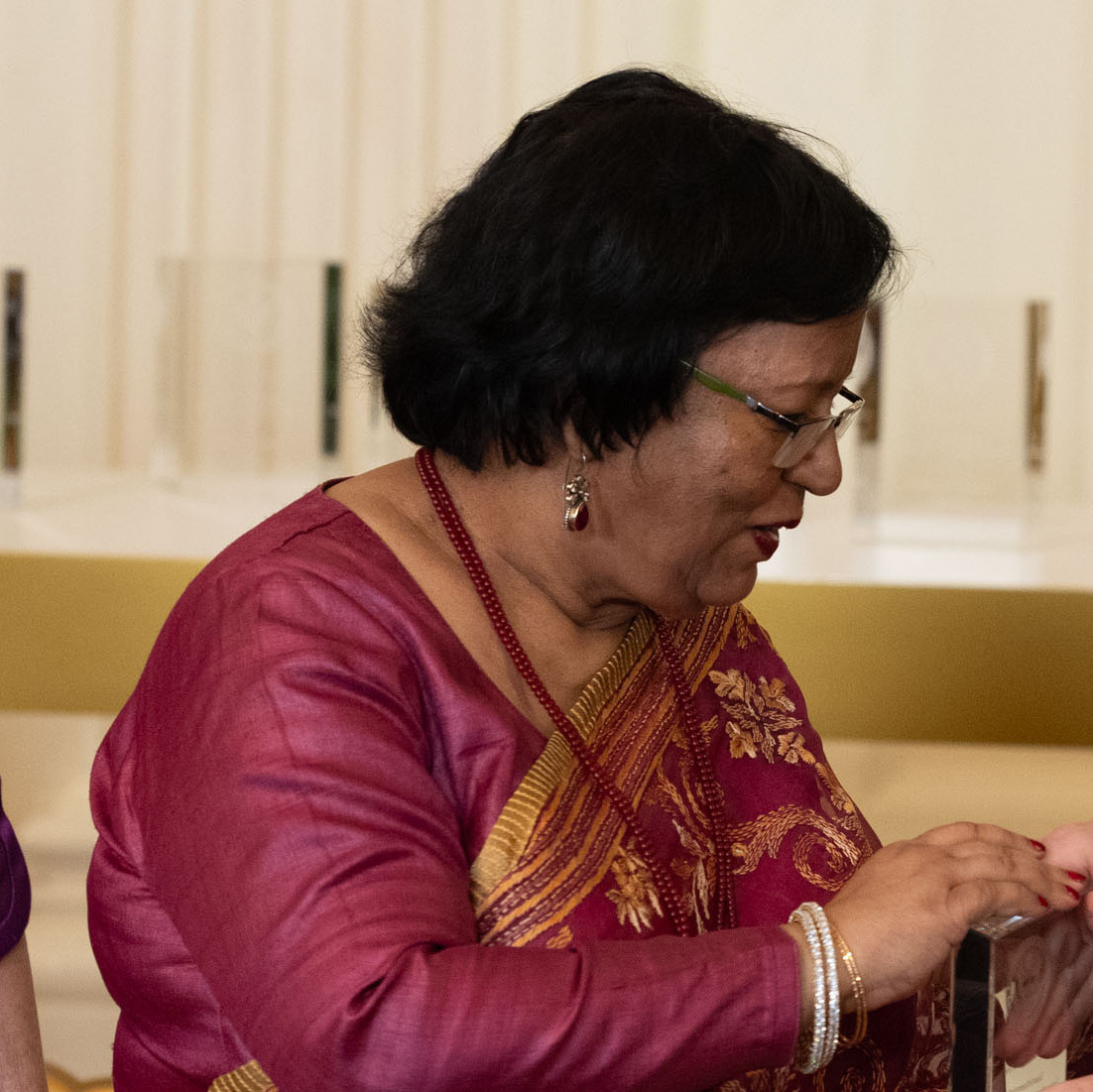
- in 2024 with her award
- Occupation: human-rights lawyer
- Known for: Bangladeshi advocate at the Supreme Court of Bangladesh

Fawzia Karim Firoze (Bengali: ফওজিয়া করিম ফিরোজ) is a Bangladeshi advocate at the Supreme Court of Bangladesh. She was recognised as an International Woman of Courage in 2024. She has supported changes to the law that garment workers, those effected by acid attacks and by sexual harassment.

== Life ==
Firoze became involved with supporting Bangladesh labour organisations in 1992. She had set up an office to look at human rights and she was shocked at the stories of abuse, intimidation and victimisation recounted by textile workers. The employers were ignoring the existing labour laws. Firoze helped support them but it was realised that there was a need for their own organisation. The conference that initiated this process was in 1994. The Bangladesh Independent Garment Workers Union Federation (BIGUF) was established in the late 1990s bringing union organisation to garment workers. Firoze's support as a human rights lawyer was said to be important in establishing the BIGUF.

The Bangladesh National Woman Lawyers Association published Firoze's Study on Women Prisoners of Bangladesh. Firoze became the President of that association from 2007 to 2018.

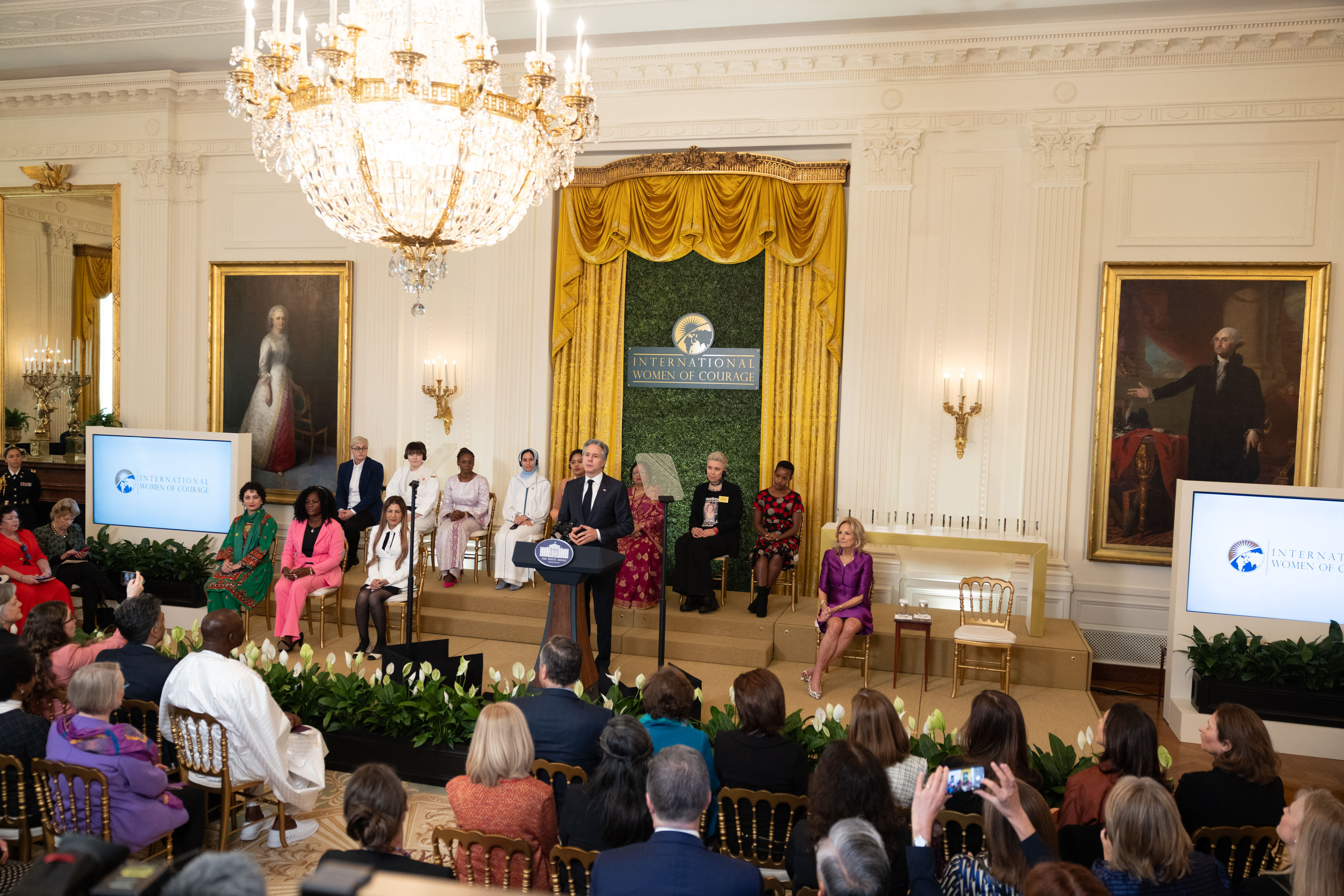
Awardees: (Back row) Ajna Jusić, Rina Gonoi, Fatou Baldeh, Rabha El Haymar, Myintzu Win, Fawzia Karim Firoze, Volha Harbunova, Agather Atuhaire. Front row to left: Fariba Balouch, Fátima Corozo, Benafsha Yaqoobi

Firoze was one of the advocates that encouraged the High Court Division of the Supreme Court of Bangladesh to rule on 13 May 2009 to prevent the sexual harassment of women and children.

Bangladesh was the first country to pass a law banning acid violence, in 2002. Firoze who was a founding trustee of the Acid Survivors Trust.

She was chair of the Foundation for Law and Development who led calls that led to Bangladesh's Domestic Workers Protection and Welfare Policy in 2015. The ruling dramatically improved the rights of domestic workers.

In 2007 she published, "Landmark Judgements on Violence Against Women of Bangladesh, India, and Pakistan".

Firoze's thirty years of work as a human right's lawyer was recognised in 2024. She became one of the twelve International Women of Courage. The award was announced and given in March 2024 to her and the others, all from different countries. After the IWOC ceremony the awardees are invited to take part in the State department's International Visitor Leadership Program where they meet each other and others interested in their work.
