= Rabha El Haymar =

Moroccan activist

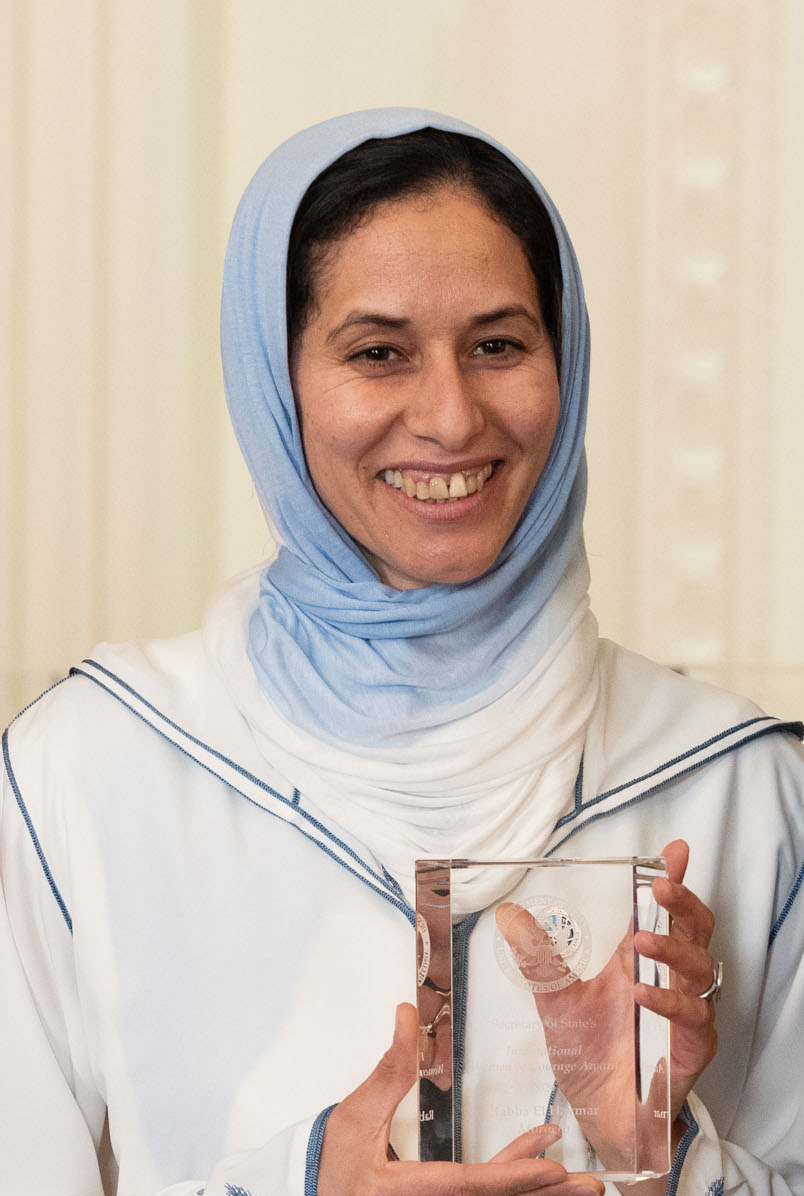
- Known for: campaigning for the rights of illegitimate children

Rabha El Haymar (Arabic: رابحة الحيمر) is a Moroccan activist who campaigns for the rights of illegitimate children. A film of her campaign by Deborah Perkin was shown on Moroccan TV and the resulting acclaim led to her recognition as an International Woman of Courage in 2024.

== Life ==
El Haymar was not married when she became a mother and this birth was outside the societal norms then present in Morocco. The family code known as the Moudawana reinforces the country's pariarchy. Her child would not have been entitled to the same rights as a child with married parents. El Haymar set out to address this and this was encouraged by the Moroccan 2004 family code introduced by King Mohammed VI.

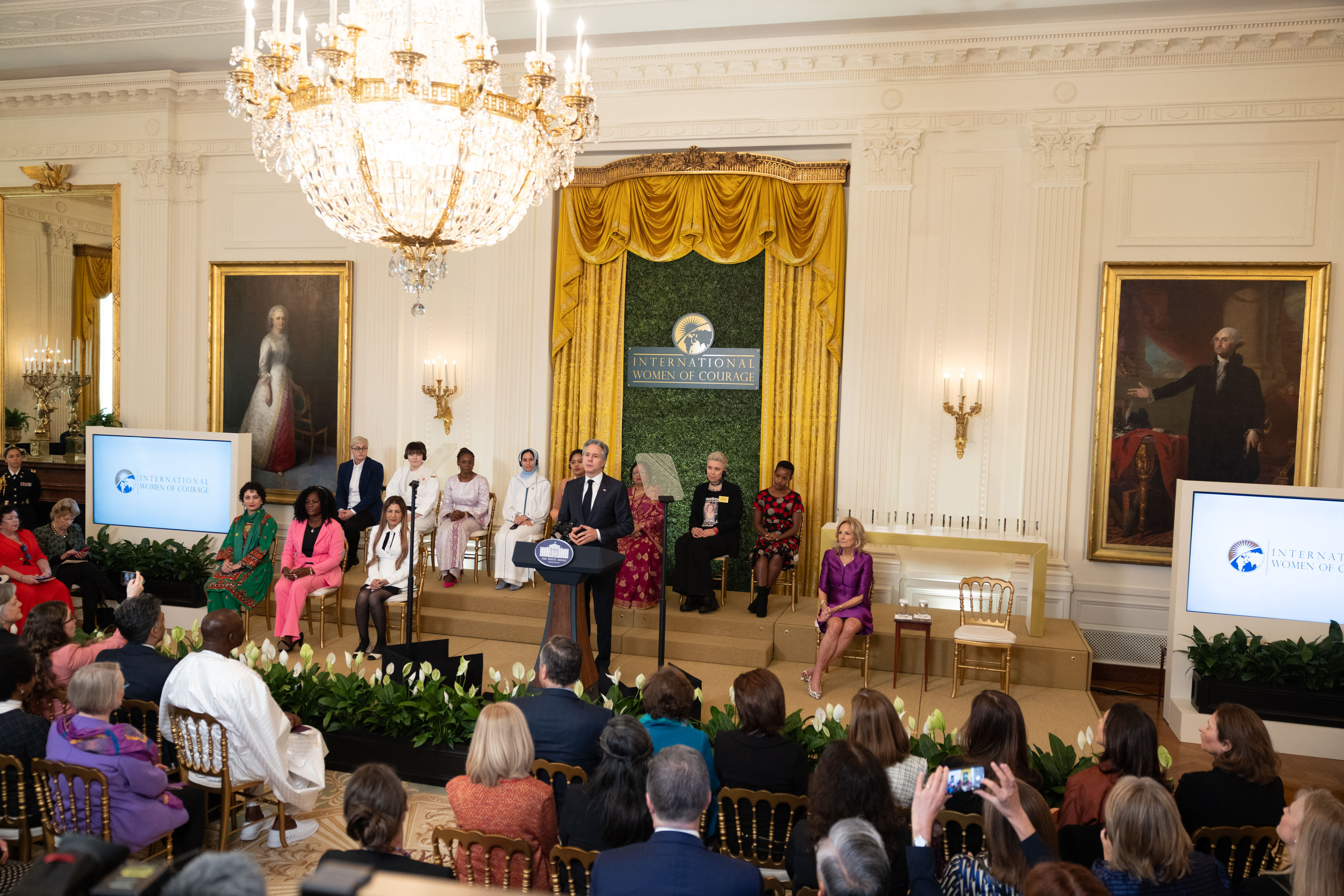
Awardees: (Back row) Ajna Jusić, Rina Gonoi, Fatou Baldeh, Rabha El Haymar, Benafsha Yaqoobi, Fawzia Karim Firoze, Volha Harbunova, Agather Atuhaire. Front row to left: Fariba Balouch, Fátima Corozo and Benafsha Yaqoobi

The story of El Haymar's struggles was filmed by Deborah Perkin and the resulting work was titled "Bastards". After the documentary was broadcast on Moroccan TV it attracted national and international attention concerning the rights of Moroccan children born to unmarried parents.

El Haymar's action and her willingness to stand up as an unmarried mother was recognised in 2024 when she became an International Woman of Courage (IWOC). The award was made in March 2024 by the US Secretary of State Antony Blinken in Washington DC. The award was welcomed by the Moroccan ambassador to the US, Youssef Amrani, and his counterpart, Puneet Talwar, the US Ambassador to Morocco. After the IWOC ceremony the awardees are invited to take part in the State department's International Visitor Leadership Program where they meet each other and others interested in their work.

Further proposals for reform of Morocco's family code have been called for by Mohammed VI. If he supports the proposals, they will be sent to the government and parliament for legal definition to become part of the Moroccan family code.
