= Pamela Judith Angwech =

Ugandan human rights activist

- Education: University of (studied Gender and Women Studies)
- Occupation: Human rights activist
- Years active: 2004–present
- Organization(s): Gulu Women's Economic Development & Globalization
- Known for: Founder & Executive Director, Gulu Women's Economic Development & Globalization
- Awards: European Union Human Rights Defender of the Year (2017)

Pamela Judith Angwech is a Ugandan human rights activist, and founder and executive director of the Gulu Women's Economic Development & Globalization, an organization focused on the intersection of women and youth located in Gulu, Northern Uganda founded in 2004. In 2017, she won the European Union Human Rights Defender of the Year award in Uganda, with her work focusing on psychosocial support, counselling, peacebuilding, climate change, economic empowerment, and livelihoods.

== Career ==
At university, she pursued a course in Gender and Women Studies. In her role as executive director, Angwech manages the WED-G. The region is still recovering from the post war period of the Lord's Resistance Army, which destroyed livelihoods and displaced families. Angwech has volunteered with the United Nations World Food Programme to distribute food items to the Internally Displaced Persons in the camp. She resigned from her job at the United Nations and founded Gulu Women's Economic Development & Globalisation, an organisation focused on addressing sexual and gender-based violence, which at the time was common in Northern Uganda. Her work strengthened women's groups and networks. This created safe spaces for women to support one another and share ideas on domestic issues and human rights.

Angwech participated in equipping female survivors of conflict with entrepreneurship skills and empowering them to sustainably cope with the aftermath of the Lords Resistance Army insurgency.

Angwech serves on the board of Women Human Rights Defenders Network in Uganda.

== See also ==
- Sarah Bireete
- Sylvia Jagwe Owachi
- Agather Atuhaire
- Patricia Ojangole
- Action for Development
