= Charity Kalebbo Ahimbisibwe =

Ugandan lawyer and human rights activist

- Born: Charity Kalebbo Ahimbisibwe
- Occupations: Lawyer, human rights activist
- Organization(s): Citizens' Coalition for Electoral Democracy in Uganda (CCEDU); Electoral Laws Institute
- Known for: Executive Director of the Citizens' Coalition for Electoral Democracy in Uganda (CCEDU); Executive Director, Electoral Laws Institute Uganda

Charity Kalebbo Ahimbisibwe is a Ugandan lawyer, human rights activist, and Executive director of the Citizens' Coalition for Electoral Democracy in Uganda (CCEDU), she is also an Executive director at Electoral Laws Institute in Uganda. As an election observer, her organization in fully registered in Uganda and has a mandate to perform voter mobilization, partnerships and advocacy to increase awareness and participation of persons with disabilities in Uganda's electoral process. She served as Communications and Advocacy Manager before joining the same organization as Executive Director at Citizens' Coalition for Electoral Democracy in Uganda .

== Career ==
Charity is keen on governments approach to election. She constantly makes policy analysis, commentaries and participates in television debates and shows to analyse electoral laws, civic participation of citizens in electoral democracy in Uganda. She also engages parliament of Uganda directly and participates in electoral reform debates and constitutional amendments to legal reforms in the Parliament of Uganda.

She has advocated for inclusion of female representatives in Parliament of Uganda by calling for a reduction of nomination fees for candidates which is high and limits participation of female candidates in the electoral process.

== See also ==
- Sarah Bireete
- Sylvia Jagwe Owachi
- Agather Atuhaire
- Patricia Ojangole
- Action for Development
