= Brenda Kugonza =

Ugandan human rights advocate

- Born: Uganda
- Occupation: Human rights advocate
- Organization: Women Human Rights Defenders Network Uganda (WHRDN-U)
- Known for: Advocacy for women’s rights and protection of women human rights advocate
- Notable work: Campaigns against Violence Against Women and Girls (VAW)
- Title: Founder and Executive Director, Women Human Rights Defenders Network Uganda (WHRDN-U)

Brenda Kugonza is a Ugandan human rights activist, Founder and Executive Director of Women Human Rights Defenders Network, Uganda (WHRDN-U). She works at the intersection of fighting injustices experience by women and girls in Uganda. The organization has built capacity of women Human Rights Defenders across Uganda. Brenda Kugonza participates in campaigns aimed at reducing Violence Against Women and girls (VAW) in partnership with other organizations such as OXFAM.

In her advocacy, Brenda voices the challenges faced by women human rights defenders especially threats, physical and sexual violence with an aim of reducing Violence Against Women and girls including those rooted in cultural and social norms She raises awareness and knowledge on women struggles related to Sexual Gender Based Violence with a holistic feminist protection approach.

Brenda is an alumna of the 2019 cohort of International Human Rights Services' "Human Rights Advocacy Program", training that built her skills in international partnership and engagement with other agencies such as the UN Committee on the Elimination of Discrimination against Women.

== See also ==
- Patricia Ojangole
- Sylvia Jagwe Owachi
- Sarah Bireete
- Agather Atuhaire
