= Florence Masuliya =

Ugandan human rights advocate

- Occupation: Human rights activist
- Organization: Tusitukirewamu Group Bwaise
- Known for: Co-founder & Executive Director, Tusitukirewamu Group Bwaise
- Board member of: Women Human Rights Defenders Network Uganda (WHRDN-U)

Florence Masuliya is a Ugandan human rights activist, and one of the founders & current Executive Director of Tusitukirewamu Group Bwaise, an organization in Bwaise, Kampala. The organisation has a climate change initiative of recycling waste in the Slum community of Bwaise, a suburb in Kampala. She serves in the Board of Directors leadership at Women Human Rights Defenders Network in Uganda (WHRDN-U).

== Career ==
Florence worked as a Program officer at Tusitukirewamu Group before becoming the Executive Director. She worked closely with local government officials and Kampala City Council Authorities (KCCA) to manage the drainage systems in Bwaise. She is a survivor of domestic violence and has supported women rights advocacy through fighting stigma on HIV/AIDs in Bwaise community and has also offered support and rescue to orphan children in the Kampala suburb.

== See also ==
- Patricia Ojangole
- Sylvia Jagwe Owachi
- Sarah Bireete
- Agather Atuhaire
