= Volha Harbunova =

Belarusian women's rights organiser and trainer

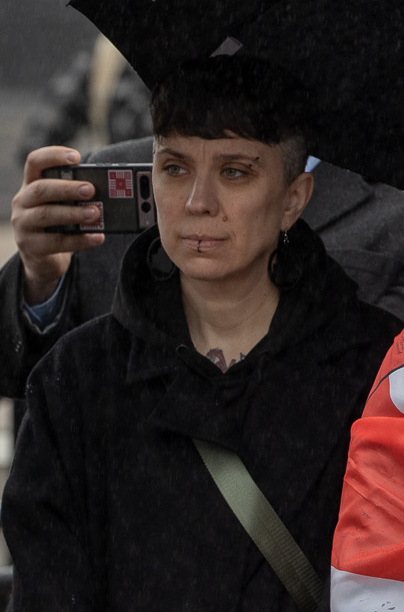
- Volha Harbunova during her visit to the United States on March 25, 2023
- Born: 7 May 1981
- Occupation: Women's rights activist, politician

Volha Alyaksandrauna Harbunova (Belarusian: Вольга Аляксандраўна Гарбунова) is a Belarusian women's rights organiser and trainer who was appointed Representative for Social Issues in the Belarusian United Transitional Cabinet on 26 December 2022. Harbunova was detained on 9 November 2021 and released to a sentence of three years of house arrest on 6 May 2022 in relation to women's rights marches held in 2020. She escaped from Belarus in 2022, prior to her nomination to the United Transitional Cabinet.

== Birth and youth ==
Volha Harbunova was born on 7 May 1981.

== Women's rights training ==
Harbunova worked for the non-governmental organization Radislava, an organisation created in 2002 by and for survivors of violence against women, for 18 years as a psychologist and as a leader of the organisation. She trained police officials and officials from welfare and health care administrations in supporting the victims of family violence.

Harbunova introduced the One Billion Rising campaign into Belarus in 2016. She created Norma Cafe, a social enterprise and cultural centre for providing training and employment for women.

Harbunova's activism includes support for the LGBT community.

== Detention ==
Harbunova was detained in Okrestina on 9 November 2021 in relation to women's rights marches that took place in mid 2020. She carried out a hunger strike in protest against her detention and conditions of detention. Within a fortnight, prison authorities responded by providing her with a mattress to sleep on, medical necessities and letting her send and receive mail. Harbunova stopped her hunger strike. She was designated by the Belarusian authorities as a prisoner "inclined to extremism and other destructive actions".

Index on Censorship published some of Harbunova's letter sent to a friend during her detention.

Charges against Harbunova were laid under Parts 1 and 2 of Article 342 and Parts 1, 2 and 3 of Article 293 of the Criminal Code of Belarus. The case was handled by judge Siarhei Shatsila. On 6 May 2022, Harbunova was found guilty of the "organization and preparation of actions that grossly violate public order" under Part 1 of Article 342. She was sentenced to three years of house arrest.

Harbunova escaped from Belarus in 2022.

== United Transitional Cabinet ==
On 26 December 2022, Harbunova was appointed Representative for Social Issues in the United Transitional Cabinet, the government-in-exile claiming to be the de jure government of Belarus, based on the argument that Sviatlana Tsikhanouskaya was the likely real winner of the 2020 Belarusian presidential election. Harbunova's role involved legal, social, psychological and humanitarian assistance and helping to develop the position of human rights ombudsman.

Harbunova resigned from her position in 2024. According to Nasha Niva, this was because she felt "tired" of negotiations with the Belarusian democratic groups in relation to her goal of freeing political prisoners. She was replaced by Volha Zazulinskaya.

== Awards ==
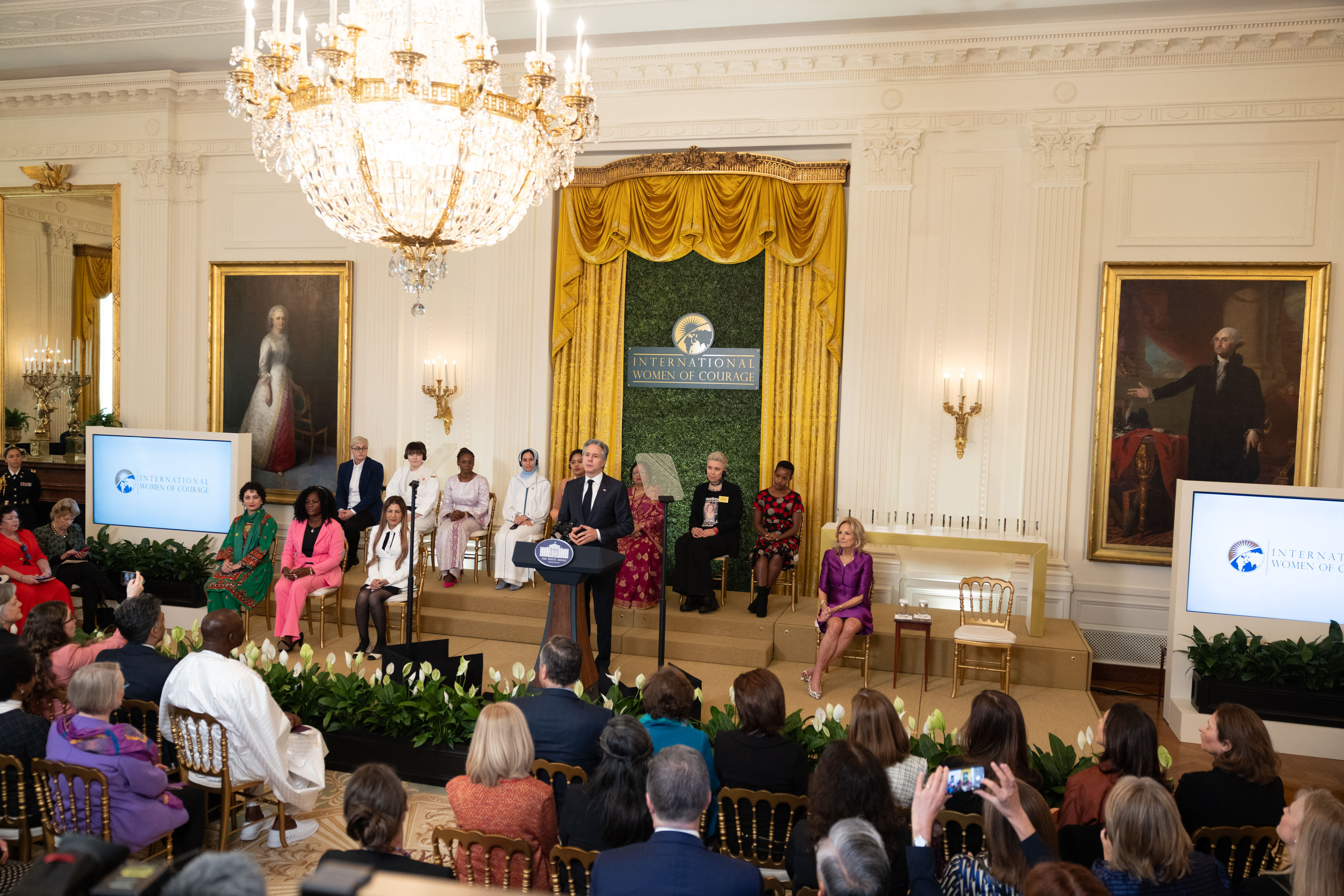
2024 International Women of Courage awardees: (Back row) Jusić at far left, Rina Gonoi, Fatou Baldeh, Rabha El Haymar, Benafsha Yaqoobi, Fawzia Karim Firoze, Volha Harbunova, Agather Atuhaire. Front row to left: Fariba Balouch, Fátima Corozo, Benafsha Yaqoobi

In 2022, Harbunova was given Front Line Defenders' Award for Human Rights Defenders at Risk. The announcement of the award was delayed until December 2022 for security reasons, since Harbunova was still in Belarus during the regular award ceremony on 27 May 2022. The award was formally presented on 9 December in Vilnius. Andrew Anderson of Front Line Defenders described the award as recognising Harbunova for "her longstanding efforts to fight for the human rights of women and children in Belarus".
