= Benedicta Nanyonga =

Ugandan human rights advocate

- Born: Benedicta Nanyonga
- Occupations: Human rights activist; Social entrepreneur
- Organization: Kinawataka Women’s Initiatives (KIWOI)
- Known for: Executive Director, Kinawataka Women’s Initiatives (KIWOI)
- Awards: United Nations Habitat Award; Recognized by Century Entrepreneurship Development Agency International (CEDA)

Benedicta Nanyonga is a Ugandan human rights activist, and Executive Director of Kinawataka Women's Initiatives (KIWOI), Kinawataka Women's Initiatives is an organization in Kinawataka, Nakawa Division, Kampala. She has been recognized by Century Entrepreneurship Development Agency International (CEDA) for her work as a role model for women youth and was profiled among the 40 women in Uganda making a difference in their communities. She also operates a children's home in Kinawataka slum.

== Career ==
Benedicta Nanyonga was filmed in a documentary by Aljazeera for her work in skills building and craft making for the community. She has offered her skills and participates mentorship training and workshops to share her entrepreneurial journey and advice for upcoming young female entrepreneurs on recycling straw materials and using it to craft hand bags and also received the United Nations Habitat Award as a recognition to her contribution to the environment.

She has been featured on The East African Magazine for her environmental contribution of recycling straws and using locally available materials to save the environment through entrepreneurship. Her initiative supports families earn a living with the skill they learn through recycling.

== See also ==
- Sarah Bireete
- Sylvia Jagwe Owachi
- Agather Atuhaire
- Patricia Ojangole
