= AWDF =

AWDF can refer to:

- African Women's Development Fund
- Angels with Dirty Faces
