= African Women's Development Fund =

Ghana-based non-governmental organization

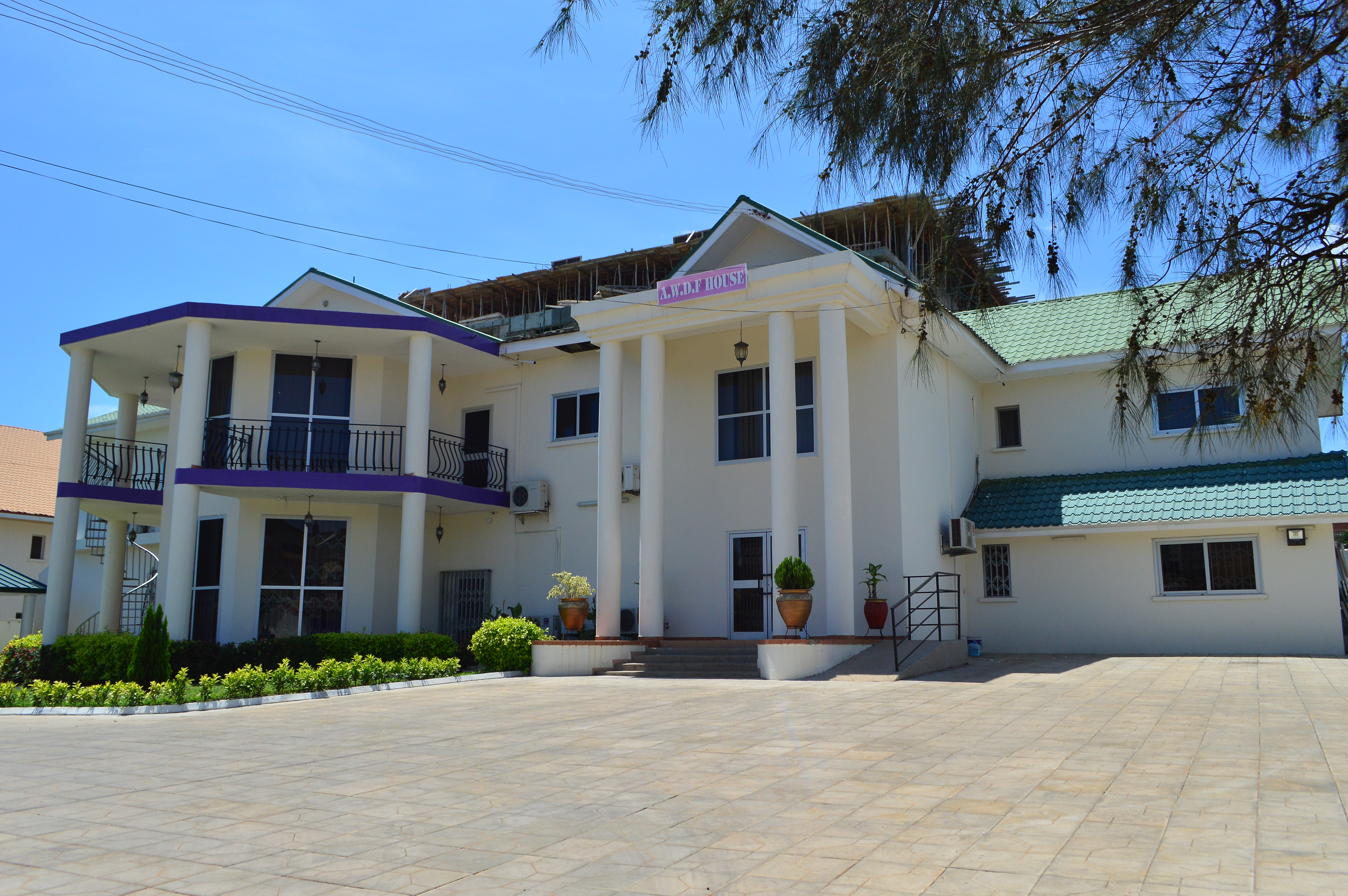
- Founded: 2000 (in Accra, Ghana)
- Founder: Bisi Adeleye-Fayemi, Joana Foster and Hilda M. Tadria
- Location: Accra, Ghana
- Region served: in 42 countries in Africa, over 1300 women's organisations
- Key people: Bisi Adeleye-Fayemi (Co-founder and former Executive Director)
- Website: http://www.awdf.org

The African Women’s Development Fund (AWDF) is a feminist non-governmental organization that operates throughout Africa and the Middle East. The AWDF’s purpose is to secure funding from different types of donors to create grants, which are then used to support a variety of feminist causes and organizations throughout the region. The AWDF was founded in 2000 by three women, Dr. Hilda Tadria, Joana Foster, and Bisi Adeleye-Fayemi, who all shared an interest in creating positive change for women. Its headquarters are located in Accra, Ghana.

== Origins ==
The AWDF's journey began in Dakar, at the 1994 preparatory World Conference on Women. Joana Foster and Dr. Hilda Tadria were both in attendance, when they struck up a conversation about the lack of funding available for women and women's organizations in Africa. Foster and Tadria shared a passion for feminist causes, and both had careers relating to women's rights. Ten years earlier, Dr. Tadria had founded an NGO called Action for Development, which supported women's issues, therefore she knew what it took to run a nonprofit organization. Foster was a lawyer who had expertise in women's rights, and was familiar with social justice. As a result, both women were aware of the difficulties involved when it came to receiving funding for organizations, especially those intended to serve women in their region. Shortly after their conversation, they began attempting to create a fund for women, but were ultimately unsuccessful until they met Bisi Adeleye-Fayemi in 1996. Adeleye-Fayemi not only had similar passions and goals, but also had the experience necessary to help get this new organization off the ground. In 1991, she had become the director of Akina Mama wa Afrika (AMwA), a UK based organization dedicated to serving women in Africa, and maintained her position there until 2001. After the three women met, they began workshopping their ideas, combining each other's expertise, and utilizing each other’s connections. This eventually resulted in the launch of the African Women’s Development Fund in the year 2000.

== Issue Areas ==
The African Women’s Development Fund focuses on addressing numerous issues that primarily affect women in Africa and some parts of the Middle East. Broadly speaking, the organization focuses on women’s human rights, gender equality, gender-based violence, LGBTQ+ causes, and improving the lives of girls and women overall. More specifically, their work includes supporting and funding women’s education, safety, cultural art, and healthcare, along with offering girls and women different resources they may be in need of or benefit from. Additionally, they facilitate gender-based research that not only helps women and girls within the region, but also helps other organizations that focus on similar issues. The AWDF itself does not fund individuals, however it often provides grants to organizations who do work with individuals.

Some examples of their notable work include the following:

- Since its inception, the AWDF has been funding organizations that provide women with access to safe abortions.
- From 2012 to 2013, AWDF joined together with the Justice, Development, and Peace Commission (JDPC) to create the Female Genital Cutting Intervention Program. This program involved education surrounding the dangers of female genital mutilation, HIV/AIDS, along with educating healthcare providers on how to manage and treat the physical and mental health of patients who have experienced genital cutting.
- Since 2014, the organization has hosted several writing workshop sessions where women throughout the region can come together to improve their literacy skills and discuss social justice issues.
- By 2016, the AWDF had granted $26,000,000 to 1,200 different organizations that support women and feminist causes across the MENA region.
- AWDF hosted a study on how gender played a role in the agricultural industry, thus promoting more gender mainstreaming in the field.

== Donors ==
Over the years, the African Women’s Development Fund has obtained and received funding from many different individuals, organizations, and foundations worldwide. Typically, the AWDF's donors are left-of-center on the political spectrum. In November of 2013, the Bill and Melinda Gates Foundation granted the AWDF with $6,998,115 to support the organization's growth and development over the course of 41 months. In 2014, the African Women’s Development Fund received a grant of $500,000 from the Carnegie Corporation of New York to help tackle the Ebola crisis. From September of 2017 to August of 2024, the AWDF has received three $1 million dollar donations from the Hewlett Foundation. In 2021, the Ford Foundation and Open Society Initiative for West Africa pledged $3.75 million over the course of 5 years to AWDF to support an end to sexual violence in Africa. In 2022, Yield Giving, an organization created by American philanthropist Mackenzie Scott, donated an unknown amount to the AWDF. In June of 2024, the Conrad N. Hilton Foundation awarded the AWDF $500,000 for a project that started in July of 2024, and is set to end in July of 2026. A comprehensive list of the AWDF’s donors can be found on their website.
