= Joana Foster =

Ghanaian activist and lawyer (1946–2016)

- Born: 15 February 1946
- Died: 5 November 2016 (aged 70)
- Citizenship: Ghana; United Kingdom
- Occupations: Lawyer, Women's rights activist
- Movement: Feminism, Nuclear disarmament
- Board member of: AWDF, WILDAF
- Spouse: Michael Foster
- Family: Richard Wilkinson and Helen Wilkinson

Joana Foster (15 February 1946 – 5 November 2016) was a Ghanaian-British activist and lawyer.

== Early life ==
Joana was born in Ghana and attended Achimota School.

== Education ==
Joana was educated in Ghana and United Kingdom. She read law at Leeds University then went on to qualify as a lawyer, and later lectured in various Colleges.

== Career ==
Joana was a lawyer by profession.

== Awards and recognition ==
Joana co founded the African Women's Development Fund along with Bisi Adeleye-Fayemi and Hilda M. Tadria in 2000.
