= Monika Hauser =

Swiss-born Italian gynecologist and women's rights advocate

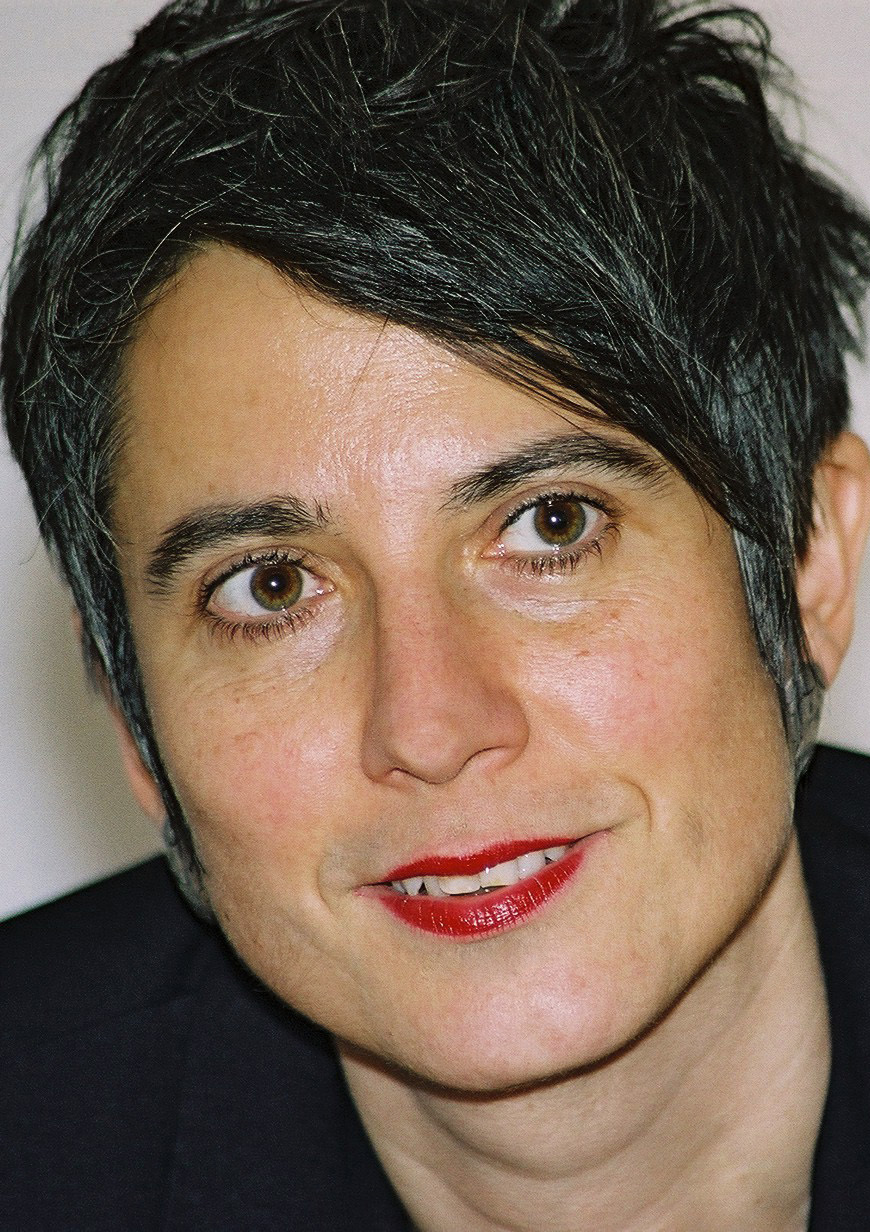
Hauser in 2004

Monika Hauser (born 24 May 1959 in Thal, Switzerland) is a Swiss-born Italian physician, gynecologist, and humanitarian. She is the founder of Medica mondiale, an internationally renowned women's rights and aid organization. Hauser lives and works in Cologne.

== Early life and education ==
Hauser spent her youth in the Swiss village of Thal, Saint Gallen, in German-speaking Switzerland, before continuing her medical studies in Innsbruck, Austria. She completed her doctorate in medicine in Innsbruck and Bologna in 1984, obtained her German medical licence in 1988 and completed her gynaecological specialization at the Essen University Hospital in 1998.

== Career ==
At the conclusion of her medical studies, Hauser moved to Cologne, where she began working on behalf of female victims of violence in warzones. To this end, she travelled to Bosnia-Herzegovina, Afghanistan, Congo, Liberia and Israel, with the organisation Medica mondiale, which she founded. In 1993, she set up the first rape crisis centre in Bosnia. She was photographed with a child in her arms who had been born as a result of a wartime rape. That child was Ajna Jusić, who grew up to become an advocate for others born after rape. She and Hauser were reunited in Sarajevo when Jusić was 25. Jusić was recognised for her work in 2024.

After her first years in the field, she suffered a mental breakdown in 1995, from which she only recovered after three months.

In 1999, Hauser initiated the project Medica mondiale Kosova, involving numerous project visits to Albania and Kosovo. In 2000, she assumed the operational leadership of Medica Mondiale.

In 2017, Hauser joined Sima Samar, Gino Strada, Ran Goldstein, and Denis Mukwege in signing an open letter published by The Lancet, in which they called on incoming Director-General of the World Health Organization Tedros Adhanom to focus on sexual and gender-based violence.

== Recognition ==
Hauser received the Right Livelihood Award in 2008 and – together with Asma Jahangir – the North-South Prize of the Council of Europe in 2012 for her work with female victims of violence in conflict zones. In addition, she is the recipient of the following honors:

- 1994 – Gustav Heinemann Prize, awarded by the Social Democratic Party of Germany
- 2000 – Peter Beier Prize, awarded by the Evangelical Church in the Rhineland
- 2005 – nomination for the Nobel Peace Prize by the organisation PeaceWomen Across the Globe, along with 1000 women
- 2011 − European of the Year, voted by the European editors of Reader's Digest and presented by Margot Wallström
- 2012 – State Prize of North Rhine-Westphalia, awarded by Minister President Hannelore Kraft
- 2017 – Honorary doctorate, University of St. Gallen
- 2017 – Paracelsus Medal, awarded by the German Medical Association
- 2019 – Decoration of Honor of the State of Tyrol

In 1996, Hauser turned down the Order of Merit of the Federal Republic of Germany in protest against the government's policy of forced repatriation of Bosnian refugees.

== Personal life ==
Hauser is married to fellow Medica Mondiale co-founder Klaus-Peter Klauner. The couple has a son and lives in Brühl.
