= UDB Tower =

Building in Uganda

- Location within Kampala

General information
- Type: Commercial
- Location: 22 Hannington Road; Kampala, Uganda
- Coordinates: 00°19′10″N 32°35′17″E
- Completed: 6 October 2026

Technical details
- Floor count: 14
- Floor area: 7,806 square metres (84,023 sq ft)

UDB Tower, whose complete name is Uganda Development Bank Tower, is a building in Kampala, the capital and largest city of Uganda. It serves as the headquarters and main office of Uganda Development Bank Limited, a government-owned development finance institution.

== Location ==
The skyscraper is located at 22 Hannington Road, in the Nakasero neighborhood, on Nakasero Hill, in the Kampala Central Division, the central business district of Kampala, Uganda's capital city. The geographical coordinates of UDB Tower are 0°19'10.0"N 32°35'17.0"E (Latitude:0.319444; Longitude:32.588056).

== Overview ==
UDB Tower accommodates the headquarters and main office of the Uganda Development Bank Limited, a parastatal and the country's only development financial institution. The building comprises fourteen floors, of which two are underground. The total area available measures 7,806 square metres (84,023 sq ft). "This includes offices, conference rooms, meeting and training rooms, customer-service areas, an innovation room, a boardroom and modern information and communications technology infrastructure". Other amenities include "integrated security and fire-safety systems". The solar panels attached to the building generate 25 kW of electricity that supplement the on-grid power supply to the office tower.

== History ==
UDB Tower is owned by its tenant, Uganda Development Bank Limited (UDBL). Sometime in the 2000s, the UDBL headquaters relocated to temporary rented space in the city of Kampala. The building was handed over to Ambitious Construction Company Limited, a Ugandan construction contractor, who renovated, modified and improved the structure. The renovated building was commissioned on 6 October 2026 by Henry Musasizi, Uganda's Minister of Finance. By consolidating all the headquarters staff in one location, UDBL expects to save an estimated UGX 1.76 billion (approx. US$432,252) in rent, utilities, and maintenance costs, on an annual basis.

== See also ==
- Kampala
- East African Development Bank
- Tall Kampala Buildings
- Central Kampala
