= Volha Zazulinskaya =

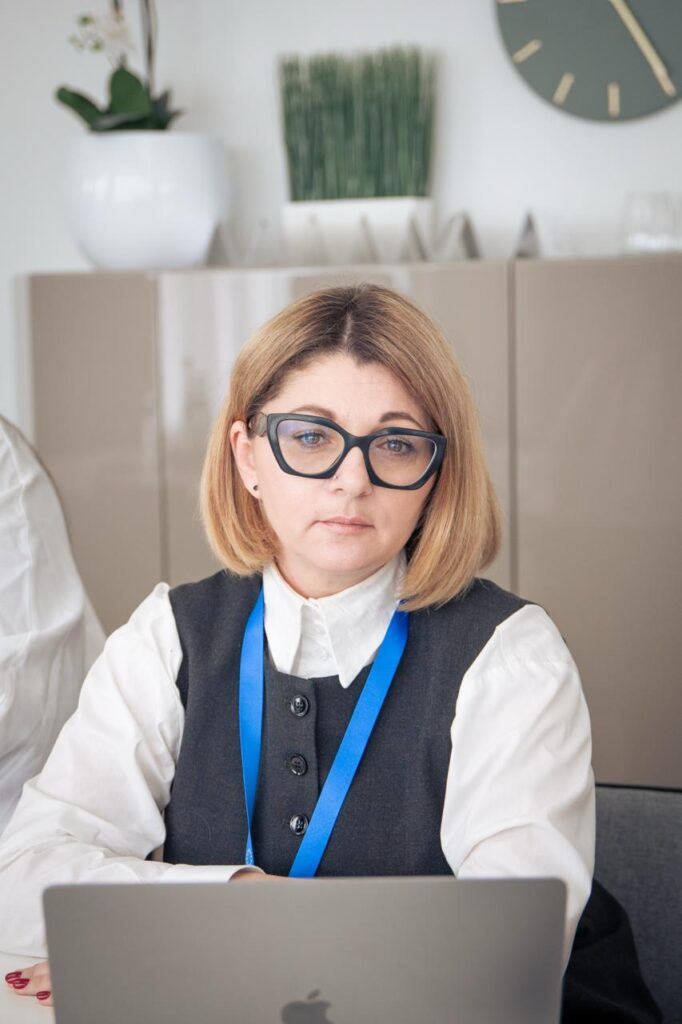
- Born: Stowbtsy
- Occupation: Human rights defender

Volha Zazulinskaya (Вольга Уладзіміраўна Зазулінская, also Olga Zazulinskaya or Zazulinskaja) is a Belarusian human rights activist. She became a member of the United Transitional Cabinet of Belarus around September 2024, as Representative for Social Policy.

== Childhood ==
Zazulinskaya grew up in Stowbtsy, raised by her mother, who became ill with cancer and died in 2018 or 2019, and her grandmother. Zazulinskaya visited Minsk for part-time jobs around the age of 16, and fully moved to Minsk at the age of 18.

Zazulinskaya studied accounting to please her mother, but found it boring. She trained as a salesperson and worked in sales until 2018.

== Activism ==
Around 2018 or 2019, Zazulinskaya started work at a fund for ill children.

Zazulinskaya was an observer at the 2020 Belarusian presidential election She was a volunteer at the medical camp for victims of police beatings at Okrestina prison following the 2020–2021 Belarusian protests. She stated that "All the people who got out were beaten and had fractures, concussions, [and were] in a terrible psychological state."

After being detained by the Belarusian KGB and her family receiving threats, Zazulinskaya left Belarus in November 2020 with her children. She and her husband divorced in 2021, which Zazulinskaya attributed to differences in relation to her intense involvement in helping activists locally and in small towns.

Zazulinskaya worked for the Country for Life Foundation as a copywriter, as coordinator for helping political prisoners, and became its head.

== Political positions ==
=== Cabinet representative ===
Zazulinskaya was nominated to replace Volha Harbunova as Representative for Social Policy in the United Transitional Cabinet of Belarus around September 2024. She stated that political prisoners had to be released and that she preferred bottom-up communication from the community to Cabinet members.

In June 2025, Zazulinskaya objected to the official Belarusian description and persecution of people labelled as "social parasites": Belarusians out of formal state-controlled employment, such as those working outside of Belarus, in informal organisations or unemployed. She described the term as form of social control through delegitimisation and social stigmatisation, aiming to create "coercive loyalty".

In August 2025, during hearings of the Cabinet by the Coordination Council, Zazulinskaya described funding difficulties in relation to a possible mass release of Belarusian political prisoners. She stated that if all 1300 political prisoners were released simultaneously, the €1.2 billion budget of the International Humanitarian Fund would be insufficient to cover all the prisoners' needs. She called for "states, organizations, and the Belarusian community" to work together to prepare for supporting released prisoners.

=== Representative in Kyiv ===
In August 2026, Zazulinskaya became head of the Mission of Democratic Forces in Kyiv, with the goal of coordination between Belarusians in Ukraine and Ukrainian authorities.

== Personal life ==
Zazulinskaya has a son and a daughter. In 2021, she and her husband divorced in relation to her activist commitments. At the age of 42, Zazulinskaya got her first tattoo. One tattoo refers to Article 23.34 of the Administrative Code of Belarus; one is the outline of Belarus with a red stripe; and one states "Freedom is above all" in Latin.
