= Dorcas Coker-Appiah =

Ghanaian lawyer and women's rights activist (born 1946)

- Born: Dorcas Ama Frema Coker-Appiah; 17 August 1946 (age 80); Wenchi, Gold Coast
- Education: University of Ghana
- Occupations: Lawyer and women's rights activist

Dorcas Ama Frema Coker-Appiah (born 17 August 1946) is a Ghanaian lawyer, women's rights activist, and the executive director of the Gender Studies and Human Rights Documentation Centre, also known as the "Gender Centre", in Accra, Ghana. She has had (and continues to have) important roles in several organisations promoting women's rights at national, regional and international levels.

== Early life ==
Coker-Appiah was born on 17 August 1946 in Wenchi, in the British colony of the Gold Coast (now Ghana). In 1970, Coker-Appiah earned a bachelor's degree in law from the University of Ghana.

== Career ==
In 1974, Coker-Appiah was a founding member of FIDA Ghana, its vice president from 1988 to 1989, and president from 1990 to 1991. She was the president of FIDA's legal aid steering committee, and the project coordinator of the legal, literacy and publication committee for some years.

Coker-Appiah is the executive director of the Gender Studies and Human Rights Documentation Centre.

Coker-Appiah is a member of Women in Law and Development in Africa (WiLDAF), a Pan-African network of organizations and individuals with members in twenty-six African countries, and a founding member of WiLDAF Ghana and the chairperson of its African regional board.

In September 2017, she led a workshop for a group of "leading African feminists" at the South African organisation Masimanyane Women's Rights International, together with Dr Hilda Tadria, the executive director of the Mentoring and Empowerment Programme for Young Women in Uganda, and provided a "powerful workshop unpacking the patriarchy system".

== Publications ==
- Breaking the Silence & Challenging the Myths of Violence Against Women and Children in Ghana: Report of a National Study on Violence (Gender Studies & Human Rights Documentation Centre, 1999, ISBN 9789988798703)
- "Evaluation of the rural response system intervention to prevent violence against women: findings from a community-randomised controlled trial in the Central Region of Ghana" (DOI: 10.1080/16549716.2019.1711336)
- "Patriarchy and gender-inequitable attitudes as drivers of intimate partner violence against women in the central region of Ghana" (DOI: 10.1186/s12889-020-08825-z)
