= Hilda Tadria =

Ugandan women's rights activist

Hilda M. Tadria
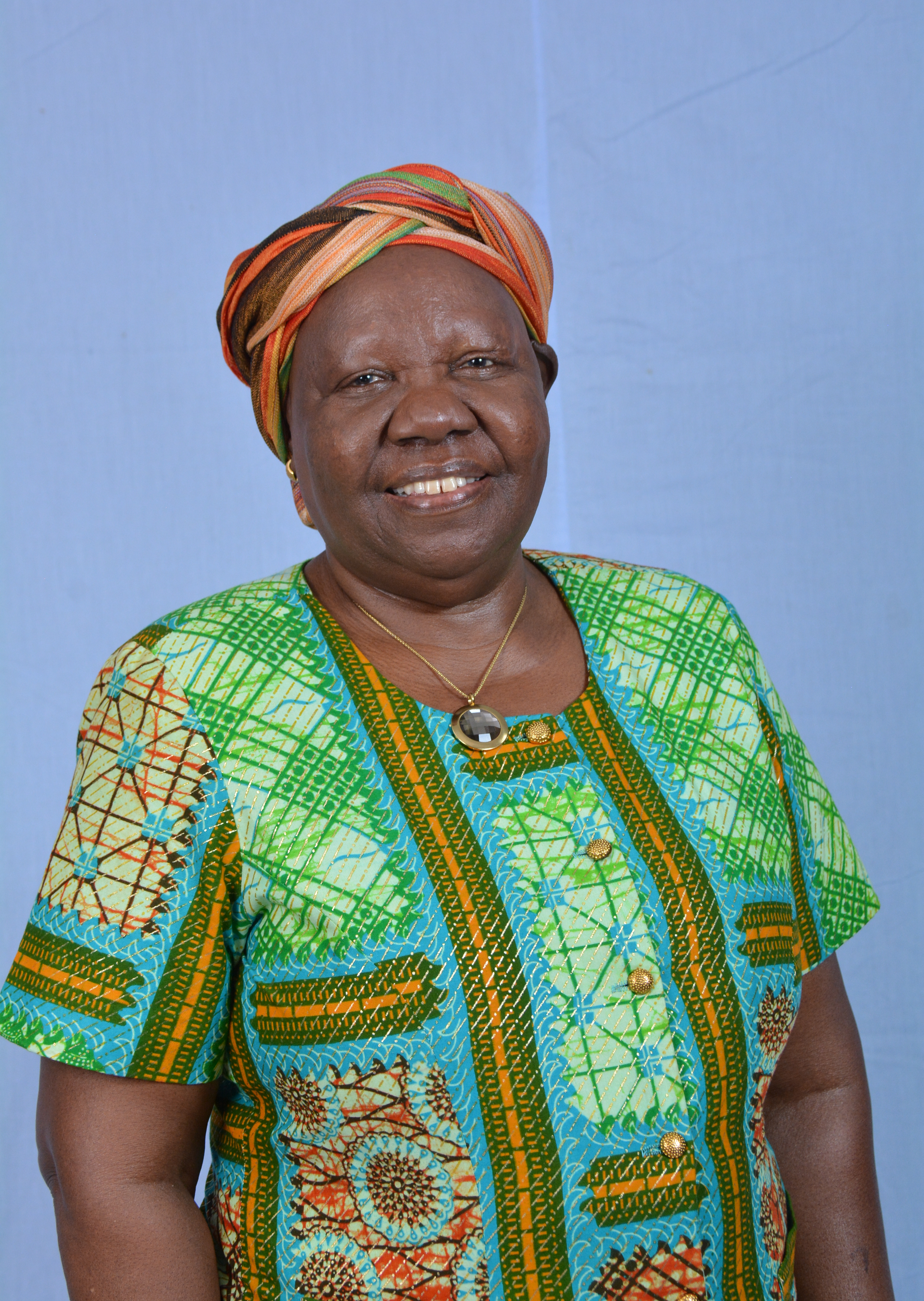
- Born: Uganda
- Education: Makerere University (B.A. Sociology); Newnham College, Cambridge (M.A. Social Anthropology); University of Minnesota (PhD Social Anthropology)
- Occupations: Women's rights activist, Gender and social development specialist, Academic
- Known for: Executive Director, MEMPROW Founder, Action for Development (ACFODE)
- Notable work: Workshops on gender and patriarchy in Africa

Hilda M. Tadria is a Ugandan women's rights activist, a gender and social development specialist, and the executive director of the Mentoring and Empowerment Programme for Young Women in Uganda (MEMPROW). She has advised NGOs worldwide on gender, institutional management and social development, and has been an associate professor at Makerere University.

== Early life ==
Tadria has a bachelor's degree in sociology from Makerere University, a master's degree in social anthropology from Newnham College, Cambridge, England, and a PhD in social anthropology from the University of Minnesota, US.

== Career ==
Tadria has worked as a consultant on gender, institutional management and social development for the World Bank, UNDP, UNIFEM, the Ugandan government, the Canadian International Development Agency (CIDA) and NOVIB.

Tadria was an associate professor in the Department of Sociology at Makerere University. While there, she founded the non-governmental organisation (NGO), Action for Development (ACFODE).

In September 2017, she led a workshop for a group of "leading African feminists" at the South African organisation Masimanyane Women's Rights International, together with Dorcas Coker-Appiah, the executive director of Ghana's Gender Studies and Human Rights Documentation Centre, and provided a "powerful workshop unpacking the patriarchy system".
