= Uganda Development Bank Limited =

Ugandan development financial institution

Coordinates: 00°19′10″N 32°35′17″E

- Type: Parastatal
- Industry: Finance
- Founded: 1972; 54 years ago
- Headquarters: UDB Tower; 22 Hannington Road; Nakaseero Hill; Kampala, Uganda
- Key people: Geoffrey Kihuguru Chairman; Patricia Adongo Ojangole; Chief Executive Officer
- Products: Loans, equity partnerships, financial advisory services, management services, export/import finance
- Revenue: ▲Aftertax:USh 63.4 billion (US$17.1 million) (2025)
- Total assets: UGX 2.28 trillion (US$613 million) (2025)
- Owner: Government of Uganda
- Number of employees: 117 (2022)
- Website: Homepage

The Uganda Development Bank Limited (UDBL) is a government-owned development financial institution in Uganda.

== Location ==
The headquarters of UDBL are housed in a fourteen-storey highrise tower called UDB Tower (Uganda Development Bank Tower), located at 22 Hannington Road, in Nakasero, on Nakasero Hill, in the Kampala Central Division, the central business district of Kampala, Uganda's capital city. The geographical coordinates of UDB Tower are 0°19'10.0"N 32°35'17.0"E (Latitude:0.319444; Longitude:32.588056).

In March 2024, management revealed plans to establish five regional offices to take services closer to the bank's clients. The location of the regional offices include the following:

- Arua office: Arua City
- Gulu office: Gulu City (Established in 2023)
- Hoima office: Hoima City (Operational in 2026)
- Mbale office: Mbale City (Established in 2026)
- Mbarara office: Mbarara City

== Overview ==
UDBL which began operating in 1972, was the first development finance institution established by the government of Uganda. The main objective of UDBL is to promote and finance development in various sectors of the economy with particular emphasis on agriculture, industry, tourism, housing, and commerce.

In June 2018, the government negotiated for a $20 million (USh 76 billion) loan from the African Development Bank to capitalize UDBL, primarily to lend to the agricultural sector for mechanization and value addition. As of December 2025, the bank's total asset portifolio was valued at UGX 2.28 trillion (approx. US$613 million), with a loan book of UGX 1.77 trillion (approx. US$475.95 million).

As of December 2025, shareholders' equity was UGX:1.89 trillion (approx. US$509 million). In August 2026, government added new investment funds amounting to UGX:63.4 billion (US$17.1 million), raising shareholders' equity to US$526.1 million. On 7 October 2026, the total shareholders' equity in the bank was reported at UGX:2.2 trillion (approximately US$546 million).

== History ==
UBDL was established in 1972. The political leadership in Uganda changed in 1979, and UDBL was then able to obtain large credits from external financiers, like the African Development Bank, the International Development Association, the European Investment Bank, the European Economic Community, the Organization of Petroleum Exporting Countries, and the Arab Bank for Economic Development in Africa (Banque Arabe pour le Développement Economique en Afrique) (BADEA). With these funds, UDBL's focus shifted to financing medium and long-term projects in manufacturing, touris and magriculture.. Between 1997 and 2001, the bank was restructured, recapitalized, and re-organized as a limited liability company, wholly owned by the government of Uganda.

== Future plans ==
As of September 2013, the bank had re-organized and repositioned itself to play a larger and more visible role in Uganda's development finance. It has developed a medium-term recapitalization plan (2013-2017) that will increase shareholder's equity from the current USh 100 billion (US$40 million), to USh 500 billion (US$200 million).

Its growth plan has been streamlined to harmonize with Uganda's National Development Plan (NDP) and with Vision 2040. Vision 2040 aims to transform Ugandan society from a peasant population to a modern and prosperous country by the year 2040. Some of the development partners that UDBL is working with include the Kuwait Fund, the African Export-Import Bank, BADEA, and the Islamic Development Bank.

In June 2020, the Uganda Ministry of Finance, Planning and Economic Development, announced its intention of further increase its share capital in UDB from USh 500 billion (US$136 million) to USh 2 trillion (US$545 million). This is part of the bank's five-year strategic plan 2020–2024.

== Services ==
UDB's services include short-term loans, medium term loans, long-term loans, equity investments, trade finance loans, and bank guarantees.

== Rating ==
In April 2024, Fitch Ratings assigned UDBL a National Long-term Rating of ‘AAA (uga)’ with a Stable Outlook, "the highest attainable on Uganda’s national scale".

== Board of directors ==
As of December 2022, UDBL's board of directors consisted of: 1. Felix Okoboi: Chairman 2. John Byaruhanga 3. Frank Tumuheirwe: 4. Nimrod Waniala 5. Henry Balwanyi Magino 6. Silvia Angey Ufoyuru 7. Patricia Ojangole - Managing Director.

== Management ==
As of August 2017, UDB's management team was: 1. Patricia Ojangole: Managing Director 2. Joshua Allan Mwesiga: Director, Strategy & Corporate Affairs 3. Denis Owens Ochieng: Director of Finance & Business Operations 4. Mahamoud Andama: Director Investment 5. Stephen Hamya: Chief Internal Auditor 6. Sophie Nakandi: Bank Secretary/Head Legal.

== Awards ==
In May 2024, UDBL was named "The Regional Bank of The Year - East Africa" at the 18th African Bankers Awards, at a ceremony in Nairobi, Kenya. At the same ceremony, UDBL won the Silver Award (A+ Rating) in the category of Development Finance Institutions for diligently following the guidelines of the Association of African Development Finance Institutions (AADFI).

== Controversy ==
According to a 2013 published report, an audit by Uganda's auditor general revealed financial impropriety by board members and senior managers at UDBL, leading to financial loss. Both the board and management team involved in the fraud were terminated and the investigation continued as of June 2014.

== See also ==
- Banking in Uganda
- Economy of Uganda
- List of banks in Uganda
- Trade and Development Bank
- East African Development Bank
- World Bank
- List of national development banks
