= Gender Studies and Human Rights Documentation Centre =

Non-governmental organization in Ghana

The Gender Studies and Human Rights Documentation Centre (Gender Centre) is a non-profit, non-governmental organization that strives to address the issues of gender inequality in Ghana. Based in Accra, Ghana, the Gender Centre has conducted studies on issues ranging from sexual and psychological violence against school girls to the ways in which social norms lead women to have a higher risk of HIV infection than men. The centre works with local, national, and international organizations in its work towards addressing the problems facing women in Ghanaian society. The Gender Centre conducts research to provide both quantitative and qualitative data that will lead to new laws, fresh outlooks, and community discussions concerning women in this region of the world.

Dorcas Coker-Appiah is the executive director of the Gender Centre.

== History ==
The Gender Studies and Human Rights Documentation Centre was founded in 1995. Since that time it has conducted numerous studies and published its findings in two books, Violence Against Women & Children in Ghana and Gender Norms, Violence Against Women, HIV/AIDS, a Case Study in Ghana.

== Projects ==
The Gender Centre publishes its research, as well as manuals, a semiannual newsletter, and an annual report, for other organizations and individuals to use in striving to combat women's inequality.

=== Nkyinkyim Anti-Violence Project ===
The Gender Centre successfully conducted the Nkyinkyim Anti-Violence Project, which began in 1998 and continues today. The project aims to abolish violence against women through conducting community-based research and pursuing a grassroots approach in which meetings with traditional leaders, religious leaders, and community members lead to local teams responsible for raising awareness, dealing with domestic violence crises, and counseling women who have been victims of violence. The project initially began with 3 communities and expanded in 2005 to include a total of 18 communities around Ghana.

=== Safe Schools Project ===
The Safe Schools Project, funded by the United States Agency for International Development (USAID) endeavors to address the pressing issue of sexual, physical, and psychological abuse of schoolgirls in Ghana. Over the course of two years the Gender Centre trained 120 counselors from thirty communities in the Central Region of Ghana to provide effective counseling to victimized school girls and to prevent further abuse by teachers and peers.

=== Ghanaian Women and HIV/AIDS ===
The Gender Centre's most recent work concerns women's susceptibility to contracting HIV due to certain social norms and gender roles that exist in Ghanaian society. For this qualitative research project, interviewers were trained to ask probing questions and used tape recorders in order to encourage conversation flow with the anonymous interviewees. The final report, published by the Gender Centre, is meant to complement empirical evidence already existing about the rate of HIV/AIDS in West Africa. The Ghanaian government has adopted the popular ABCs of HIV prevention (abstinence, be faithful, use a condom), but the research by the Gender Centre shows that gender norms and domestic violence make this approach to combating the spread of HIV somewhat ineffective. Women in Ghana are traditionally sexually submissive, meaning that they are not always able to deny their male partners sex or insist on condom use. Men, on the other hand, are often free to take multiple sexual partners and even multiple wives. The practice of wife inheritance in which a widow will marry her deceased husband's relative can promote the spread of HIV as well, since the woman may have the virus herself or can contract it from her new husband's other wives or partners. Additionally, the social stigmatization faced by women already infected discourages them from revealing their positive status, putting others at risk for contracting the disease. After this initial research, the Gender Centre has been conducting meetings and workshops to raise awareness about how such social norms are putting women at a higher risk for contracting HIV. The Center endeavors to reverse these detrimental gender norms by holding support meetings in major cities all over the country and by running a series of radio shows about women's vulnerability to HIV/AIDS conducted in the local languages of Twi, Ewe, and Wale, as well as English.

== Collaborations ==
The Gender Centre has collaborated with other organizations and agencies as it works to promote awareness about the issues facing women in Ghana today. The centre has most recently worked with the Department for International Development (DFID), Rural Watch, Academy for Educational Development (AED), Bawku East Women's Development Association (BEWDA), The Centre for the Development for People (CEDEP), Amasachina Self Help Association, and the General Agricultural Workers' Union (GAWU) of the Ghana Trades Union Congress (TUC).

== Publications ==
The Gender Centre has published three works of research and analysis, Breaking the Silence & Challenging the Myths of Violence Against Women & Children in Ghana: Report of a National Study on Violence edited by Dorcas Coker-Appiah and Kathy Cusack, Gender Norms, Domestic Violence and Women's Vulnerability to HIV/AIDS, and its most recent work, officially launched on 4 May 2010, The Architecture for Violence Against Women in Ghana edited by Kathy Cusack and Takyiwaa Manuh.
