= Agather Atuhaire =

Ugandan lawyer, human rights defender, and journalist (born c. 1988)

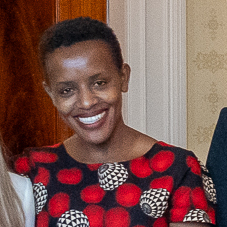
- in 2024
- Born: Sheema District
- Education: Makerere University
- Occupation: journalist
- Known for: investigating and whistle-blowing

Agather Atuhaire (born c. 1988) is a Ugandan lawyer, human rights defender and freelance journalist. Her work in exposing corruption and maladministration gained her recognition from the ambassador of the European Union and the US Secretary of State.

== Life ==
Atuhaire was born in Sheema District in about 1988. She completed high school due to a scholarship at Alliance School Mbarara. Lack of money meant that she could not fulfil her ambition to take law so she studied journalism at Makerere University.

In June 2022 she was made human rights defender of the month by DefendDefenders.

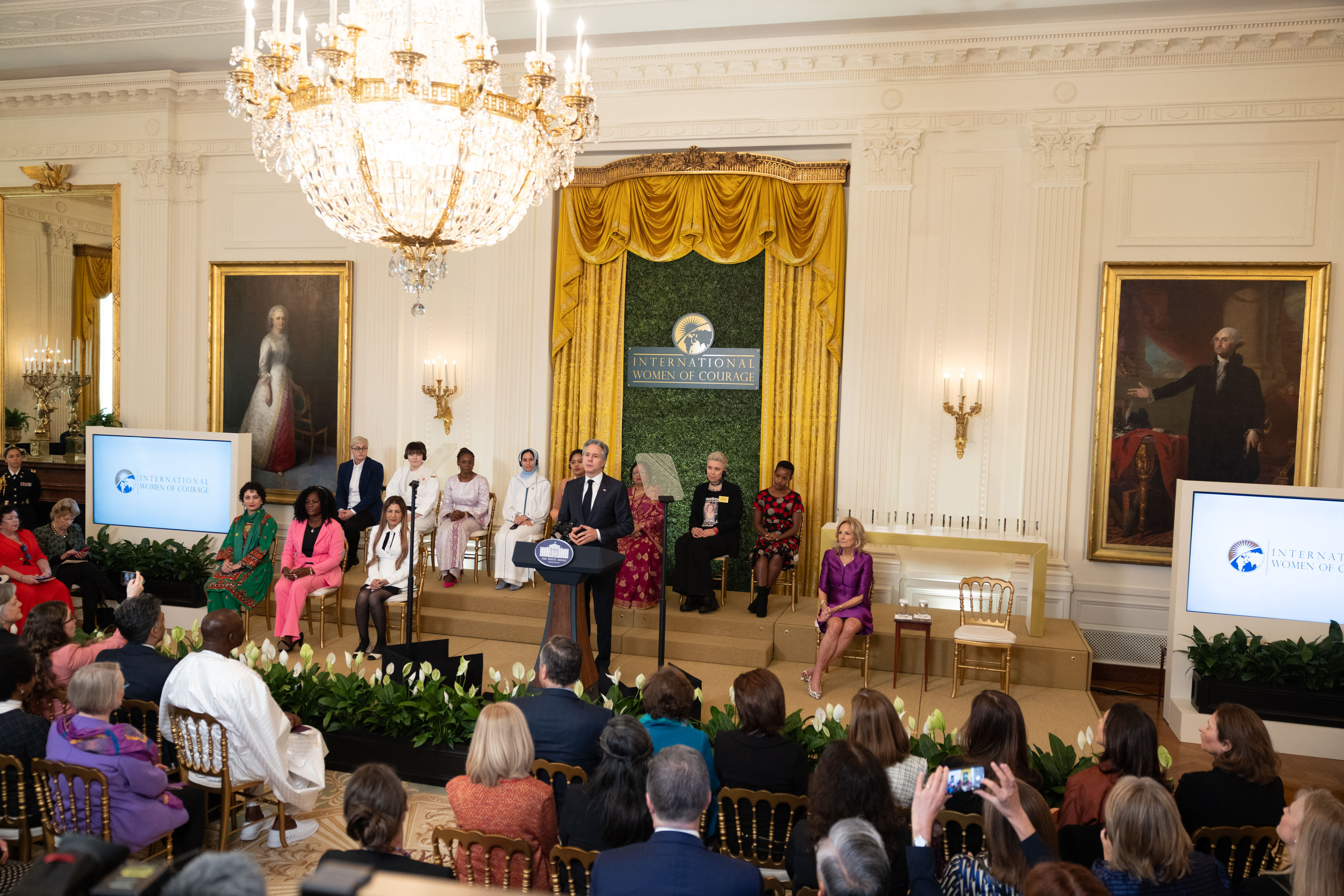
Awardees: (Back row) Ajna Jusić, Rina Gonoi, Fatou Baldeh, Rabha El Haymar, Benafsha Yaqoobi, Fawzia Karim Firoze, Volha Harbunova and Atuhaire. Front row to left: Fariba Balouch, Fátima Corozo, Benafsha Yaqoobi

In 2023 she was given the EU Human Rights Defenders Award for 2022 by the EU Ambassador to Uganda, Jan Sadek. Saduk identified her recent work with the Law Development Center where she discovered that students inexplicably fail courses and there was no appeals or investigations. She has had disputes with the politicians Anita Among and Mathias Mpuuga and with the local sewerage company. Atuhaire revealed that Anita Among and her deputy had both purchased expensive cars using public money. The cars were not necessary as they both already had luxury cars. When the purchase was not approved they had those responsible replaced with more compliant individuals. Atuhaire exposure of this corruption led to her being called to account. She was given threats when her accusers discovered that she could not be arrested because everything she had done was legal.

In March 2024 she was in Washington where she was recognised as an International Woman of Courage by the US State Department. U.S. Secretary of State Antony Blinken and first lady Jill Biden made the award on 4 March 2024. After the IWOC ceremony the awardees are invited to take part in the State department's International Visitor Leadership Program where they meet each other and others interested in their work.

In May 2025, she traveled to Tanzania with Kenyan activist Boniface Mwangi to observe the trials of Tundu Lissu, leader of the opposition Chadema party. They were detained by a state security official dressed in plain clothing. The activists allege undergoing torture during detainment. Mwangi was stripped naked, hung upside-down from a pole, and sexually assaulted, while Atuhaire was taken to a separate room and raped. In response, the United States sanctioned senior police official Faustine Jackson Mafwele.

== See Also ==
- Jimmy Spire Ssentongo
- Rita Aciro
- Tumuheirwe Florence
- Stella Nyanzi
