= Medica mondiale =

- Founded: 1993
- Founder: Monika Hauser
- Type: Medical, psychological, legal, and social support for women and girls affected by sexual violence; political work
- Website: medicamondiale.org/en/

Medica mondiale is a women's rights and aid organisation based in Cologne, Germany. It supports projects and advocates politically for girls and women affected by sexual violence in war zones worldwide.

== History ==
Shocked by the mass rapes of Bosnian women and the lack of media coverage, gynaecologist Monika Hauser went to the conflict area in the former Yugoslavia in late 1992. In April 1993, Hauser and about 20 local psychologists and physicians opened the therapy centre Medica Zenica in Zenica, Bosnia. They developed concepts on how to help women and their children suffering from war trauma, both during and after the war. In Germany, supporters collected donations for the centre, organised supply convoys to the war zone and raised awareness. In June 1993, Hauser founded the association Medica mondiale in Cologne. The German news show Tagesthemen awarded her the title "woman of the year".

In 1996, Medica Zenica was officially recognised in Bosnia as a humanitarian organisation. In 1999, they expanded their activities to Kosovo and Albania, where more centres caring for raped and traumatised women where established. The interdisciplinary women's counselling centre in rural Gjakova in Kosovo has been independent since 2011.

On the basis of the concept developed in Bosnia, the organisation's activity was expanded to more countries, including Afghanistan, where the 2002-established Medica Afghanistan has operated independently since 2011. Since 2004, subsidies through a project fund have been channelled to selected women's organisations, mainly in the Central African region of the Great Lakes. Since autumn 2014, the association has been working in the Middle East, in the Syria/Iraq region and Turkey, to support women and girls who are affected and threatened of sexual violence, both in their home countries and as refugees.

== Mission and vision ==
The organisation's vision is that all women and girls can live in a world without violence and discrimination, in dignity and equality in family and society. It offers medical, social and psychological help, as well as legal advice and representation to women with symptoms of trauma. Locals are trained to work with traumatised women, advisory and healthcare centres are built and possibilities for securing subsistence are created. Furthermore, crimes against women are documented and charges are prepared.

The object is capacity building and supporting an independent life in equity, both through individual work with affected women, and by influencing the societal and political framework. This applies also to new organisations established by the organisation. These organisations continue to receive financial support and advice after establishment.

The organisation disapproves of any form of nationalism and fundamentalism and sees itself as part of the international women's movement. It advocates for tolerance and appreciation of cultural and social diversity, as long as this is compatible with universal human rights. It calls for the implementation and further development of Resolution 1325, which was adopted in 2000.

It is a member of several German NGO networks.

== Project work worldwide ==
Working with partner organisations worldwide, Medica Mondiale supports projects in several regions:

=== South Eastern Europe ===
In addition to Medica Zenica, the association opened an interdisciplinary women's counselling centre in rural Gjakova in Kosovo after the end of the Kosovo war in 1999. Medica Gjakova has been independent since 2011.

=== Afghanistan ===
In 2001, German involvement in the war in Afghanistan began. A short time later, from the beginning of 2002, the association founded Medica Afghanistan. The women's rights organisation has been independent since 2011. After the Taliban took power in August 2021, the situation for women and girls in Afghanistan has extremely deteriorated. They are excluded from public life, and access to civil rights and freedoms has been severely restricted.

=== Africa ===
Since 2004, funding has flowed to selected women's organisations, mainly in the Central African Great Lakes region, through a project fund. The association supports partner organisations in the DR Congo, Rwanda, Uganda and Burundi. Since 2006, medica mondiale has been working in the south-east of Liberia in a joint project with the German Welthungerhilfe to provide medical and psychosocial care and support for Liberian women. The women's rights organisation medica Liberia, which was founded there, has been independent since 2015.

=== Middle East ===
Since autumn 2014, the association has been working in the Syria/Iraq region. Due to the civil war in Syria and the unstable political situation in Iraq caused by the terrorist organisation "Islamic State", the association supports women and girls who are affected and threatened by sexual violence both in their home countries and when fleeing.

== Stress- and trauma-sensitive approach ==
The organisation has developed a stress- and trauma-sensitive approach to support people affected by violence, especially women. The trauma-sensitive approach takes into account basic principles in dealing with people who have experienced violence. The main point is to avoid additional stress for those affected. In addition, the stress- and trauma-sensitive approach should prevent retraumatisation and strengthen women in restoring their self-esteem. The aim of psychosocial support is to support the management of traumatic experiences. This support goes along with measures designed to change political frameworks, structures and social awareness, including training for non-governmental organisations, police and health and legal staff.

== Training ==
The association Medica Mondiale trains trainers who offer further training on the STA - stress and trauma sensitive approach as multipliers. These trainings are suitable for professionals working in the fields of international cooperation and civil peace service. Specialists and managers as well as staff from the fields of conflict transformation, peacebuilding, flight and migration, mental health, human rights, peacebuilding or gender justice learn to understand stress, trauma and trauma dynamics in different fields of work and to support people with experience of violence in a sensitised way with regard to the aforementioned topics. The skills taught are used, for example, in the areas of communication, dealing with people affected by violence and project design.

== Lobbying and campaigns ==
Through educational and human rights work, the association wants to make social and political changes in favour of women, both in Germany and worldwide. At events, in discussions with politicians, but also in position papers and open letters, the organisation takes a stand on sexualised wartime violence, names strategies for the prevention of sexual violence and calls on decision-makers to act.

Through campaigns, the association drew attention to sexual violence in the war and its consequences: Zeit zu sprechen (time to speak) in 2005 drew awareness to crimes against women during the Second World War. The campaign Im Einsatz (in action) from 2008 to 2011 provided information about women and girls in war and crisis areas and asked for support for them. In 2015, Medica mondiale and Medica Zenica published a systematic study of the long-term consequences of war rape in Bosnia and Herzegovina.

With the support of the Ministry of Health, Emancipation, Nursing and Age of the State of North Rhine-Westphalia, the association has been offering training courses for workers and volunteers in the field of flight and migration since 2016, as well as seminars for health professionals involved in the care of those seeking protection. In June 2016, the association developed, in cooperation with Kölner Flüchtlingsrat e.V. (the Cologne Refugee Council), a position paper on the protection of women in refugee accommodations, which was submitted to the Ministry of the Interior and Municipal Affairs of North Rhine-Westphalia.

== Funding ==
The work of the organisation is financed by donations and grants from public funds. An annual report provides information about revenue and expenditure.
