= Eldad Mwangusya =

Justice of the Supreme Court of Uganda

- Born: Uganda
- Citizenship: Uganda
- Education: Makerere University (Bachelor of Laws); Law Development Centre ( Diploma in Legal Practice)
- Occupations: Lawyer, judge
- Years active: 1976 — present
- Known for: Law
- Title: Justice of the Supreme Court of Uganda

Eldad Mwangusya is a Ugandan judge who has served as a Justice of the Supreme Court of Uganda, since 2015.

== Career ==
Justice Mwangusya started his legal career in 1976, as a state attorney at the Ministry of Justice. He rose through the ranks to become principal state attorney. For a period of one year, from 1997 until 1998, he practiced as a private lawyer.

He started as resident judge of the Fort Portal and Masaka judicial circuits. He was then promoted to the High Court, rising to deputy head of the International Crimes Division of the High Court. Later he became the head of the Civil Division of the High Court.

In 2013, he was appointed to the Court of Appeal (which also serves as the Constitutional Court). At the Constitutional Court, Mwangusya wrote the court's Majority judgment "that struck down the Anti-homosexuality Act on grounds that it was passed by parliament without quorum". In 2014, Justice Mwangusya was among the seven justices that ruled that it was unconstitutional to reappoint former Chief Justice Benjamin Odoki upon retirement at age 70.

== Other considerations ==
Justice Mwangusya served as legal counsel to the "Commission of Inquiry into the Escape of Prisoners from Murchison Bay Prison" and the "Commission of Inquiry into Uganda Posts and Telecommunications". He also served as a member of the "Non-Government Organisations Board", a government agency that regulates Non Government Organisations in Uganda.

== See also ==
- Judiciary of Uganda
