= Myintzu Win =

Criminal defense lawyer

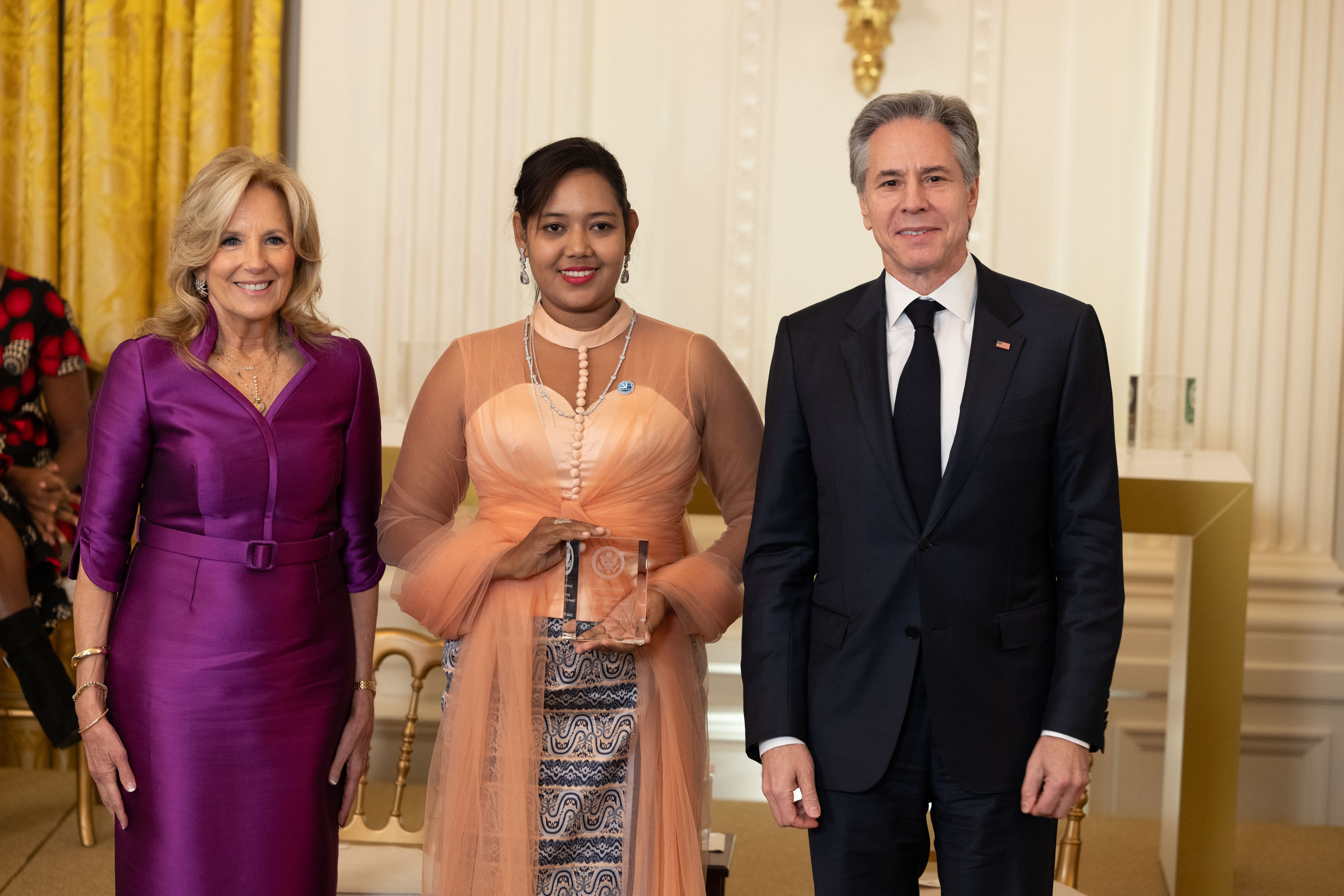
Secretary Antony J. Blinken, First Lady Jill Biden, and Myintzu Win at the 18th annual International Women of Courage Award Ceremony at the White House in Washington, D.C.

Myintzu Win is a criminal defense lawyer and fights for the rights of marginalized communities in Myanmar. She became an International Women of Courage Award recipient in 2024.
