= Sarah Bireete =

Ugandan lawyer and activist

- Citizenship: Uganda
- Occupation: Lawyer
- Years active: 2011–present
- Organization: Center for Constitutional Governance
- Known for: Human rights activism
- Television: UBC Behind The Headlines
- Criminal status: Acquitted

Sarah Bireete is a Ugandan lawyer, human rights defender, and political activist. She is the founding partner and executive director of the Center for Constitutional Governance (CCG), a non-governmental organization and government watchdog based in Uganda. Bireete also serves as a chairperson of the East and Horn of Africa Elections Observers Network (E-HORN), a coalition of election observer groups working to protect electoral integrity in East Africa.

== Career ==
In 2020, Bireete was appointed as the executive director of the Center for Constitutional Governance (CCG), having served as its deputy executive director from 2011 to 2019. She is also a chairperson of the East and Horn of Africa Elections Observers Network (E-HORN). Previously, she had worked in the Ugandan Ministry of Foreign Affairs, serving as a national coordinator for the International Conference on the Great Lakes Region.

Prior to 2011, she was a public defender and member of the Public Defenders Association of Uganda. Bireete practices as a lawyer, and is a partner at Dickens Kamugisha & Co. in Kampala. She has also served as a panelist on the Uganda Broadcasting Corporation (UBC) political show UBC Behind The Headlines, and currently performs the same role on Civic Space TV's Chat Show UG, the digital outreach arm of the CCG.

Bireete chairs the national coalition on civic space in Uganda, and is a member of Vuka Allies for Uganda, a coalition of local activist groups that aims to combat political repression. As a political activist, she has publicaly advocated for various causes in areas of constitutionalism, human rights, electoral democracy, land rights, public interest litigation, and conflict transformation.

== Controversies ==
On June 14, 2009, Bireete was arrested by the Uganda Police Force and charged with embezzlement and abuse of office in her role at the Ministry of Foreign Affairs. She was remanded to Luzira Prison until June 26, when she stood trial in Uganda's Anti-Corruption Court. During the trial, prosecutors accused her of embezzling a total of USD$114,160 between February and May 2009. Judge John Bosco Katutsi found Bireete guilty on all charges, and she was sentenced to ten years' imprisonment.

Bireete appealed the verdict to the Court of Appeal of Uganda. In 2016, the Court of Appeal acquitted her of abuse of office, but upheld her conviction for embezzlement. Bireete appealed this decision to the Supreme Court of Uganda, which unanimously acquitted her of embezzlement. In a majority 4-1 decision, Supreme Court justices Lillian Tibatemwa-Ekirikubinza, Eldad Mwangusya, Rubby Opio-Aweri, and Paul Mugamba ruled that the prosecution's case against her did not satisfy the required burden of proof, and that there was no evidence directly linking her to the embezzlement of the lost money.

On December 30, 2025, Sarah Bireete was arrested and remanded to Luzira Prison on charges of unlawfully obtaining and publishing data from the National Voters' Register. Amnesty International criticized the arrest as "arbitrary" and in violation of bail guidelines, and noted that it highlighted a growing pattern of repression against political opposition in Uganda.

On January 28, 2026, Sarah Bireete was granted bail by the chief magistrate of Buganda Road Court, and was subsequently released from police custody.

== See also ==
- Agather Atuhaire
- Sheila Kawamala Mishabi
