= Action for Development =

Ugandan NGO

- Formation: 1985
- Headquarters: Kampala
- Executive Director: Regina Bafaki
- Website: https://acfode.or.ug/

Action for Development (ACFODE) is an indigenous (Ugandan) non government Women Association founded by women academicians; Dr Joy Kwesiga, Dr Hilda Tadria and Dr Ruth Mukama with the help of Maxine Ankra with the aim of incorporating ideas discussed during the United Nations World Conference on Women held in July 1985 in Nairobi, Kenya. Uganda had been denied entry into the conference because of the prevailing political climate at the time, thus the need to start an organization that would champion women issues without government interference.

== Activities ==
ACFODE focuses on issues related to women empowerment in Uganda through research, capacity building, coalition building, mobilization, sensitization and advocacy for policy formulation.

It also champions the women's cause and gender equality on the national Agenda and puts emphasis on ending sexual Gender based violence and discrimination in Uganda.

ACFODE is also an advocate for good governance and democracy through monitoring and civic education. It also promotes formulation and implementation of gender responsive political, economic, and social policies and programs.

It also contributes to building and strengthening of sister civil society organizations in Uganda.

== Mentorship Program ==
ACFODE initiated a civic engagement mentorship program dubbed Sauti Ya Sasa, an initiative aimed at building leadership skills for youth in Uganda. This program equipped many young people with critical decision-making abilities, smart choices and enhanced leadership opportunities at various organisational capacities.

== Location ==
ACFODE's headquarters are found at plot 623/624 Dan Mulika close - Bukoto.
