= Fariba Balouch =

Iranian human rights activist

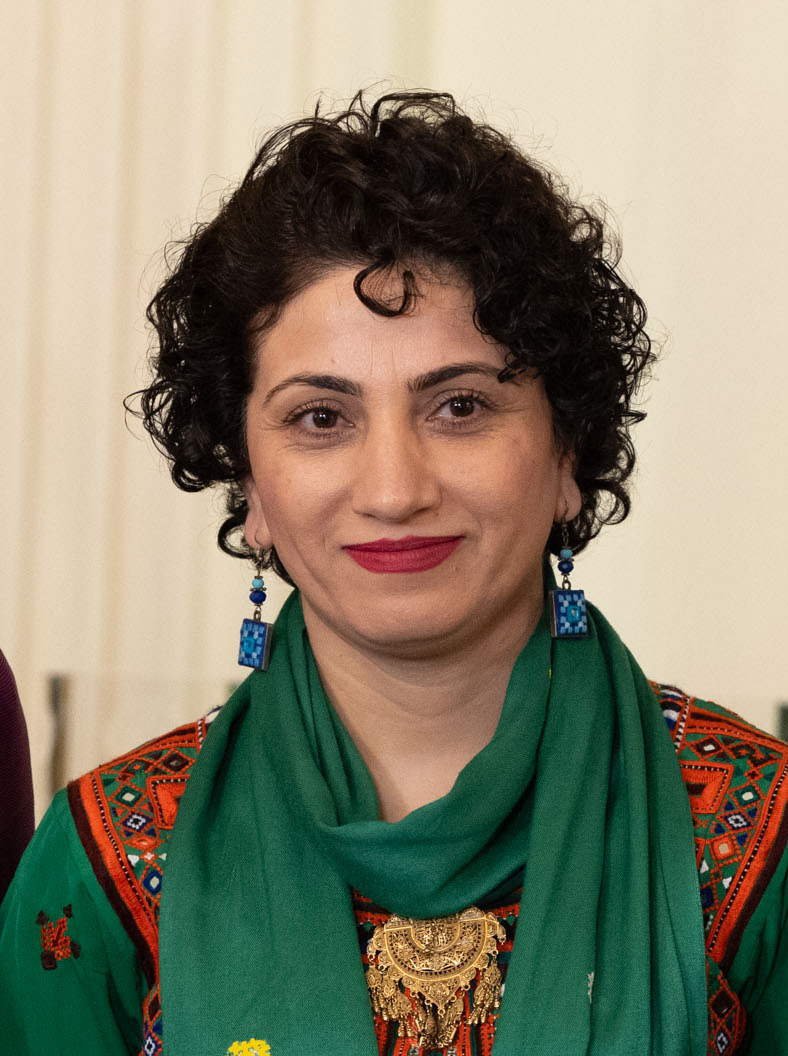
Fariba Baloch in the 18th annual International Women of Courage Award Ceremony at the White House in Washington

Fariba Balouch is an Iranian human rights activist based in London. She is an Iranian Baloch. She works for women's rights and human rights in Sistan and Baluchistan in Iran. She received the 2024 International Women of Courage award.

She is particularly outspoken about the challenges faced by women in Balochistan region, advocating for gender equity and justice amidst widespread human rights abuses. Her life and activism are chronicled in the documentary film "In This Cage," which provides insight into the struggles faced by women in Sistan and Balochistan, highlighting the broader human rights crisis in the region.

According to an interview published in The Prisma, Balouch stated that “Every time a woman stands up for herself, she stands up for all women,” reflecting her view on women’s empowerment and activism.
