= Fatou Baldeh =

Gambian human rights activist (born 1983)

Fatou Baldeh MBE
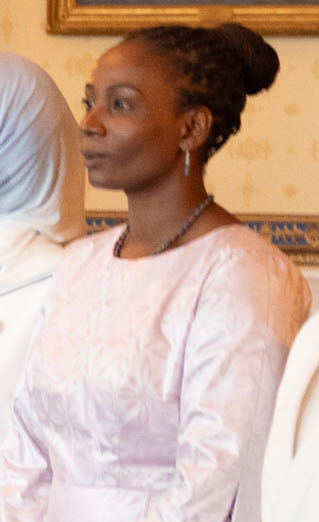
- Born: December 1983 (age 42–43); The Gambia
- Education: University of Wolverhampton; Queen Margaret University
- Occupations: Human rights activist, women's rights activist
- Known for: Anti-FGM campaigner in Scotland and Gambia
- Awards: Member of the Order of the British Empire, International Women of Courage Award, Geneva Summit Women’s Rights Award, The Albies Award
- Website: www.womeninliberation.org

Fatou Baldeh MBE (born December 1983) is a Gambian women's rights activist who campaigns to end female genital mutilation (FGM).

== Early life and education ==
Baldeh underwent female genital mutilation at the age of seven and became a survivor of mutilation, similar to hundreds of millions of other girls and women around the world. It has been reported that 73% of women and girls aged 15–49 have experienced FGM in The Gambia.

Baldeh completed a bachelor's degree in Psychology and Health at the University of Wolverhampton and a master's degree in sexual and reproductive health at Queen Margaret University, Edinburgh. She is currently a Ph.D. candidate at Canterbury Christ Church University and a Research Fellow at the Medical Research Council Unit The Gambia at the London School of Hygiene and Tropical Medicine.

== Career, activism and recognition ==
After finishing her studies, she worked for the Dignity Alert Research Forum in Edinburgh, working to strengthen women's rights and human rights. She was appointed as the director of the Dignity Alert Research Forum in May 2015.

In 2013, Fatou spoke publicly about the issues of female genital mutilation of girls in Scotland. On 30 January 2014, she subsequently appeared before the Equal Opportunities Committee at the Scottish Parliament, where she was asked to outline the measures and guidelines required in order to prevent young women from being victims of FGM in Scotland.

After spending years studying and working with various NGOs supporting BAME communities in Scotland, Baldeh returned to The Gambia in 2018. She founded the Women in Liberation and Leadership (WILL) organisation after returning to her home country. WILL works to transform and protect the lives and rights of women in The Gambia.

Alongside The Gambia's Truth, Reconciliation and Reparations Commission (TRRC), WILL documented the stories of women under Yahya Jammeh's 22-year dictatorship, which came to an end in 2017. The regime was characterised by widespread human rights violations including Sexual and Gender-Based Violence (SGBV).

In January 2020, she was given the MBE by the British High Commissioner to the Gambia, Sharon Wardle, as a result of the 2019 Special Honours, in recognition of her valuable efforts and commitments regarding advocating black minority and ethnic communities in Scotland.

In March 2020, Baldeh was awarded The Sise Saweneh Award/Outstanding Woman of the Year for her outstanding contribution in empowering girls and women in Gambia.

In 2024, she received the US State Department’s International Women of Courage Award and the Geneva Summit Women’s Rights Award, celebrating her leadership in defending human dignity.

In early 2025, TIME named her one of the Women of the Year and former US President Barack Obama publicly recognised her efforts to end FGM on International Women’s Day. To mark the same occasion, Harvard University listed her as one of the 25 Extraordinary Women in the World. TIME later included her in their 2025 list of the 100 most influential people in the world.

In October 2025, she was also one of the 2025 honorees for the Albies Award presented by the Clooney Foundation for Justice, in recognition of her instrumental role in leading advocacy efforts against the 2024 attempt to overturn The Gambia's national ban on female genital multilation (FGM).
