= Sylvia Jagwe Owachi =

Ugandan banker and corporate executive

- Born: c. 1973 (age 52–53); Uganda
- Education: Makerere University; Bachelor of Commerce; Heriot-Watt University; Master of Business Administration
- Occupations: Businesswoman and corporate executive
- Years active: 1996–present
- Title: Acting CEO of Cairo Bank Uganda
- Predecessor: Ahmed Maher Nada

Sylvia Jagwe Owachi is a Ugandan businesswoman, banker and corporate executive, who is the acting chief executive officer of Cairo Bank Uganda, a commercial bank, effective 1 January 2021. She was the executive director at Cairo Bank Uganda from July 2021 to December 2021.

== Early life and education ==
Owachi was born in Uganda c. 1973. She attended Gayaza High School for both her O-Level and A-Level education. In 1993, she was admitted to Makerere University, Uganda's oldest and largest public university, where she graduated with a Bachelor of Commerce degree, majoring in finance. Later, she was awarded a Master of Business Administration degree, by Heriot-Watt University, in Edinburgh, Scotland, United Kingdom.

== Career ==
Owachi joined Standard Chartered Uganda (SCBU) in June 1996. She worked there full-time in various roles including as credit analyst, relationship manager and corporate service manager. In 2007, she was promoted to senior credit manager, then to senior risk manager in 2010 and to senior relationship manager local corporates and international corporates. Her last assignment at SCBU, for the last two years of her tenure there, was as the head of commodity traders and agribusiness.

In 2016, she left SCBU and was hired by Guaranty Trust Bank Uganda, as the head of corporate banking for over four years. In June 2020, Owachi was appointed an executive director at Cairo Bank Uganda. She worked in that role until January 2022, when she was promoted to acting CEO/managing director at that bank.

== Family ==
Owachi is a married mother of three sons.

== Other considerations ==
As the acting CEO of Cairo Bank Uganda, Owachi replaced Ahmad Maher Nada, an Egyptian national, who had led the bank for the previous three and a half years.
