= Benafsha Yaqoobi =

Afghan disability rights activist

- بنفشه یقوبی
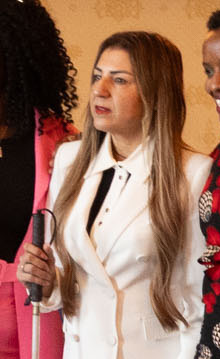
- Benafsha Yaqoobi, 2021
- Born: Afghanistan
- Occupations: Disability rights activist, lawyer, television host
- Years active: 2008–present
- Known for: Founding Rahyab Organisation; appointed commissioner at AIHRC; named in BBC 100 Women (2021)

Benafsha Yaqoobi (also known as Benafsha Yaqubi) is an Afghan disability rights activist. In 2021, she was named one of the BBC's 100 Women.

== Career ==
Benafsha Yaqoobi was born blind in Afghanistan and became a disability rights activist. She studied Persian literature in Iran and then took two master’s degrees in Kabul, before working at the Attorney General's Office. With her husband Mahdi Salami, who is also blind, she founded the Rahyab Organisation to assist and educate the visually impaired.

From 2019 onwards, Yaqoobi was a commissioner at the Afghan Independent Human Rights Commission (AIHRC) until she fled Afghanistan with her husband in 2021 after the Taliban retook power. On their third attempt to leave, they made it to Kabul airport and traveled to the UK.

Yakubi has also worked for the education of visually impaired children.

In 2020, Yaqoobi was a candidate for the Committee on the Rights of Persons with Disabilities. She was made one of the BBC's 100 Women in 2021.
