= Patricia Ojangole =

Ugandan accountant and bank executive

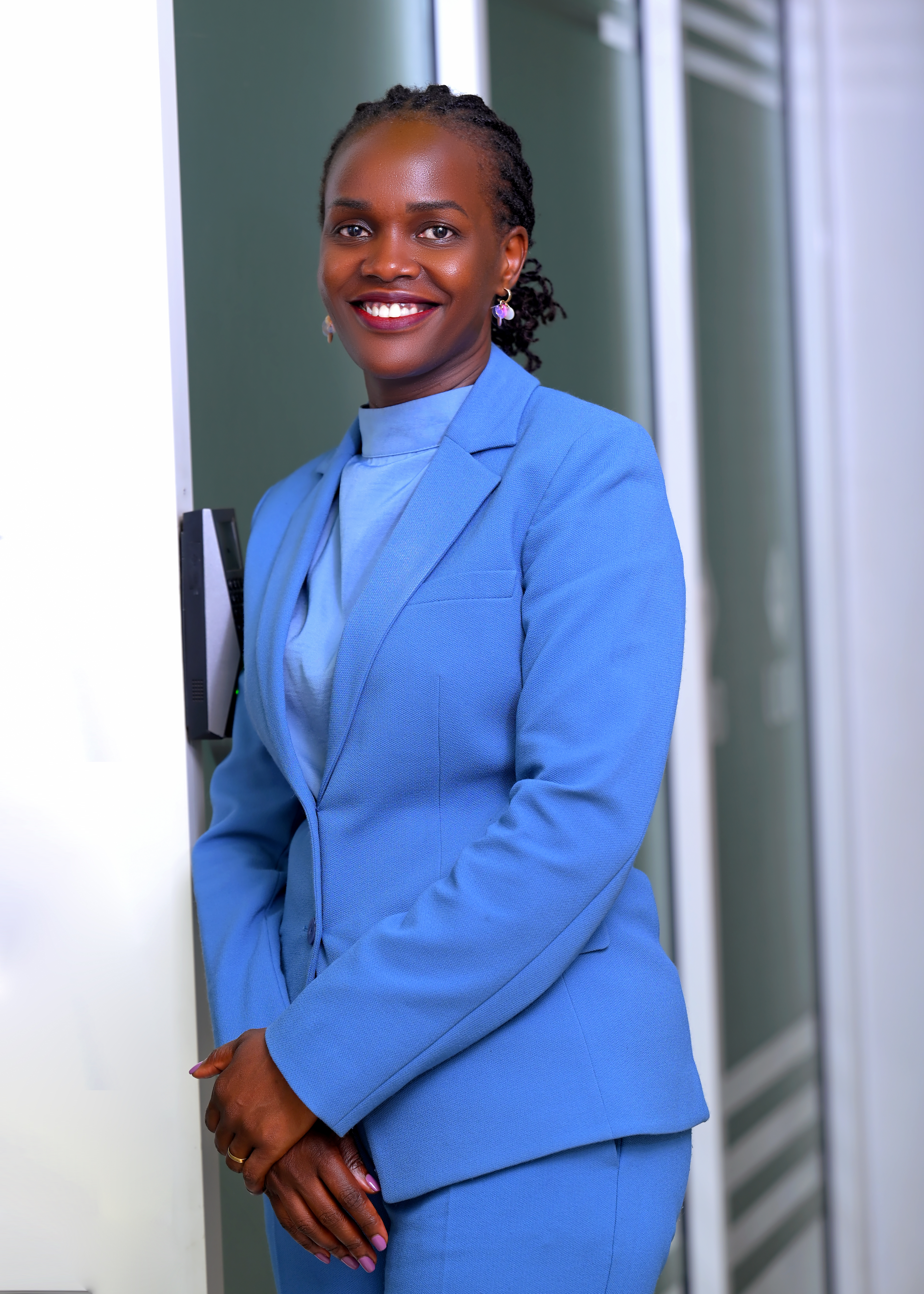
- Born: 1977 (age 48–49); Uganda
- Citizenship: Uganda
- Education: Makerere University (Bachelor of Commerce); University of Stellenbosch (Master of Philosophy) (Doctor of Philosophy); Eastern and Southern African Management Institute (Master of Business Administration)
- Occupations: Accountant and Bank Executive
- Years active: 2002 – present
- Known for: Management

Patricia Adong Ojangole is a Ugandan accountant and bank executive. She is the chief executive officer of Uganda Development Bank Limited (UDBL), Uganda's only national development finance institution.

== Education ==
She holds a Bachelor of Commerce degree awarded by Makerere University, in Kampala, Uganda's capital city. Her Master of Business Administration was received from the Eastern and Southern African Management Institute in Arusha, Tanzania. She is a Fellow of the Association of Chartered Certified Accountants of the United Kingdom. She is also a member of the Institute of Certified Public Accountants of Uganda and the Institute of Internal Auditors. She holds a Master of Philosophy from Stellenbosch University in South Africa. On 27 March 2025, she successfully defended her Doctor of Philosophy titled "Structural Transformation, Private Sector Credit, and Growth: Implications for Employment and Economic Growth in Uganda" from Stellenbosch Business School.

== Career ==
Ojangole worked for 13 years in various African countries including Kenya, Tanzania, Uganda, Namibia, Swaziland, Lesotho and Botswana. Her work covered diverse business areas including credit, risk management and finance. She joined Uganda Development Bank Limited as Head, Internal Audit.

== Controversy ==
On 30 November 2012, Ojangole was appointed as chief executive officer at UDBL. On 10 February 2014 a Magistrate in the Anti-Corruption Court ordered the arrest of Patricia Ojangole on two counts: (1) Alleged conflict of interest by her participation in the process that culminated in her selection as CEO and (2) Alleged victimization of a whistleblower. For several months, the case wound through Uganda's legal system.

On 30 June 2014, Judge Lawrence Gidudu of the Anti Corruption Court acquitted and discharged Ojangole of all the charges against her, due to lack of incriminating evidence. The judge noted that "the prosecution evidence was in support of Ms. Ojangole and therefore he had no option but to acquit". She continues to serve as the CEO at UDBL.
