= Fátima Corozo =

Ecuadorian activist

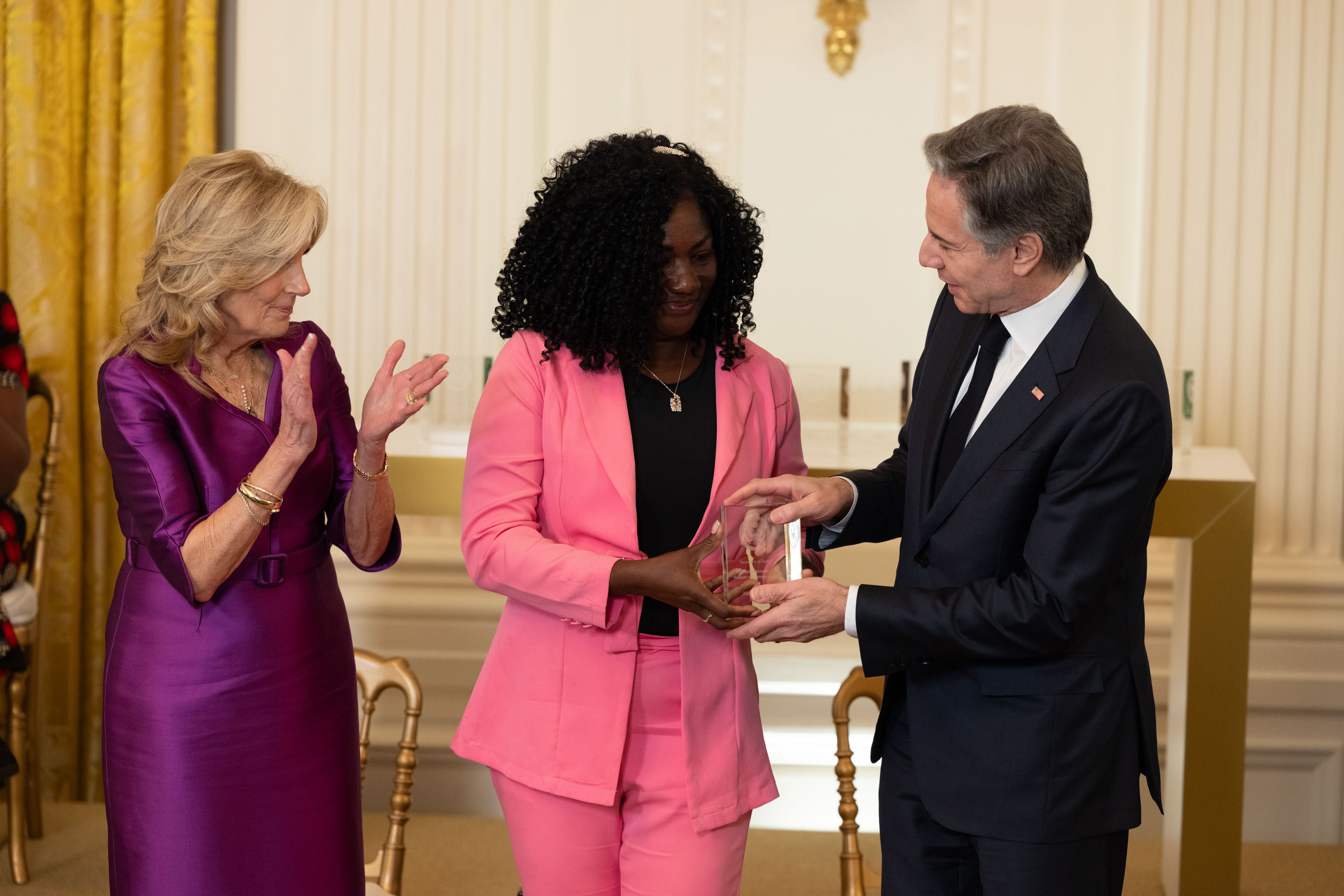
Secretary Antony J. Blinken, First Lady Jill Biden, and Fátima Corozo participate in the 18th annual International Women of Courage Award Ceremony at the White House in Washington, D.C.

Fátima Corozo is an activist working in Esmeraldas, one of the most violent cities in Ecuador. A school teacher, she works with youth and her community and discourages violence. She received the 2024 International Women of Courage award.
