= Rina Gonoi =

Japanese judoka and former soldier

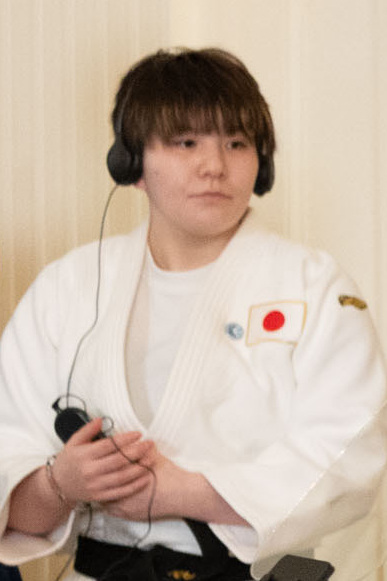
Gonoi in 2024

Rina Gonoi (五ノ井 里奈, Gonoi Rina; born September 29, 1999) is a Japanese judoka and former soldier of the Japan Ground Self-Defense Force (JGSDF). She was sexually assaulted by senior male JGSDF officers, forcing her to quit the military after her complaints of sexual assault were dismissed by superior officers.

== Childhood ==
Rina Gonoi, from Higashimatsushima, Miyagi Prefecture started judo at the age of four and trained under her brother. She natured the ambition of competing at Olympics as a judo player. In 2011, when Gonoi was 11, she and her family were displaced by the March 2011 earthquake and tsunami. Gonoi for the first time encountered JGSDF officers conducting humanitarian operations: smartly dressed, they helped displaced people prepare makeshift bathing booths, and served them warm water, food and other necessities. Gonoi specially admired the female officers and developed an interest in joining the JGSDF so that one day she could also help people in trouble.

== Military career ==
Gonoi joined the JGSDF in 2020, planning to use its sports facilities to train in judo and achieve her dreams of competing at the Olympics. However, once in the JGSDF, she experienced sexual assault on a daily basis. Her first sexual harassment occurred at a JGSDF station in Fukushima where male colleagues sexually commented on her body and breast size, kissed her on the cheek, groped or hugged her from the back in an alleyway in front of others without her consent. Sometimes male colleagues would tell her things like “give me a blow job”. The worst incident happened during an August 2021 training exercise when a group of three officers, Shutaro Shibuya, Ryoto Sekine, and Yusuke Kimezawa summoned her to a tent where they were drinking. The officers were discussing a martial arts technique involving choking opponents and putting them to the ground. They ordered Gonoi to submit to the choking method. In the process they pinned her to a bed, spread her legs open, and pressed their crotches against her in a sexual simulation in front of dozens of other watching and laughing colleagues.

Gonoi reported the sexual assault to superior officers but her claims were promptly dismissed for lack of evidence, as all male colleagues who witnessed the assault refused to testify. She then reported to a more superior JGSDF authority, but again her claim was dismissed for lack of evidence and no action. This forced her out of the military in June 2022.

== Pursuit of justice ==
Once out of the force, she approached TV stations but was also ignored and finally took the case to social media. Her social media campaign forced the military authority to probe sexual assaults in the entire JGSDF and her own case was reopened with a fresh investigation. It was found that Gonoi had suffered physical and verbal sexual harassment daily between autumn 2020 and August 2021. The Japan's Ministry of Defense, through Ground Self-Defense Force Chief of Staff Yoshihide Yoshida, tendered an apology to Gonoi saying “On behalf of the Ground Self-Defense Forces, I would like to express my deepest apologies to Ms. Gonoi, who has been suffering for a long time. I am very sorry.” Five servicemen involved in the act were dismissed and four others were punished.

Not satisfied with the apology from military authorities, Gonoi filed both criminal and civil cases against the government and the alleged assault perpetrators. When the court case started in early 2023, one of the alleged perpetrators pleaded guilty while four others pleaded not guilty. In December 2023, the Fukushima District Court sentenced all three to two years in prison, suspended for four years. All were sentenced without appeal on deadline.

== Awards ==
In November 2023, Gonoi was named to the BBC's 100 Women list.

In March 2024, She received International Women of Courage Award.
