= Laura Vicuña =

Chilean child Saint

Blessed Laura Vicuña
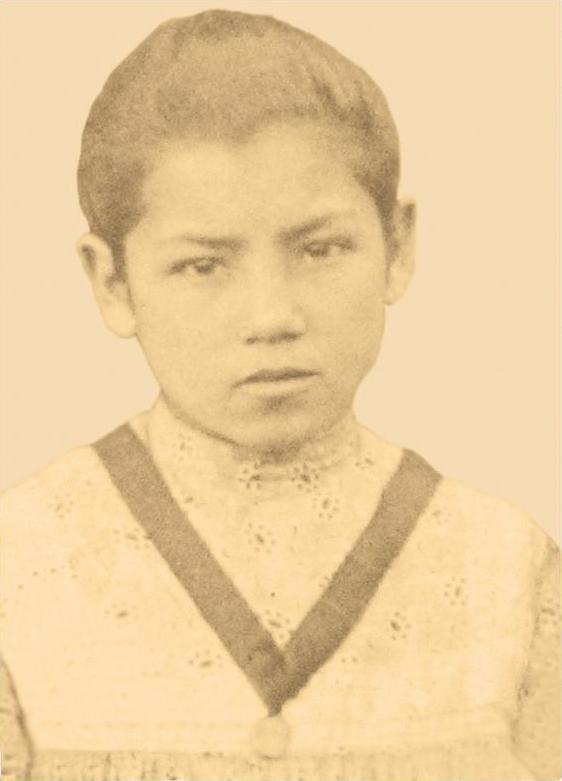
- Photograph of Laura Vicuña.

Virgin
- Born: Laura del Cármen Vicuña Pino; April 5, 1891; Santiago, Chile
- Died: January 22, 1904 (aged 12); Junín de los Andes, Neuquén, Argentina
- Venerated in: Roman Catholic Church
- Beatified: 3 September 1988, Saint Peter's Square, Vatican City by Pope John Paul II
- Major shrine: Renca Hill, Renca, Chile
- Feast: 22 January

Laura del Carmen Vicuña Pino (5 April 1891 – 22 January 1904) was a Chilean child who was noted for her religious devotion. She was beatified by Pope John Paul II in 1988 as the patron of abuse victims, having herself experienced physical abuse.

== Biography ==
=== Escape from Chile ===
Laura del Carmen Vicuña was born on April 5, 1891, in Santiago, Chile, to José Domingo Vicuña and Mercedes Pino. The Vicuña family were Chilean aristocrats, the father in military service and the mother working at home. Forced out of Santiago by the revolution, the family took refuge in Temuco, but soon after José Domingo died suddenly and Mercedes went to live, with her two daughters, in Argentina.

=== Early years in Argentina ===
Mercedes and her daughters moved to the Argentine province of Neuquén. In search of a way to finance her daughters' education, Mercedes took a job in the Quilquihué Hostel. The owner of the hostel, Manuel Mora, propositioned Mercedes, promising to pay for Laura's education in exchange. Laura soon entered the Hijas de Maria Auxiliadora (“Daughters of Mary Help of Christians”) School, where, under the care of the nuns, she began to take a deep interest in the Catholic faith.

Because of her deep religious interest, she was not well liked by her classmates. She spent most of her time praying before The Blessed Sacrament in the school's chapel. She prayed every day for her mother's salvation and for her to leave Manuel Mora. She had one good friend, Mercedes Vera, to whom she confided her desire to become a nun.

=== Problems at her home ===
During one of her school vacations, Laura was beaten twice by Manuel Mora, who wanted her to forget about becoming a nun. She held to this desire even when Mora stopped paying for her education, and when the nuns at her school learned of the conflict, they gave Laura and her sister scholarships. Although she was grateful to her teachers, she still worried about her mother's situation.

=== The sacrifice ===
One day, remembering the phrase of Jesus: “No one has greater love than to give up one’s life for one’s friends," Laura decided with the authorization of her Bishop to give her life in exchange for her mother's salvation. As time passed she became seriously ill with pulmonary tuberculosis. One day she was beaten up by Manuel Mora even though she was very weak and sick and that accelerated her death. Before she died, Laura told her mother: “Mama, I offer my life for you, I asked our Lord for this. Before I die, Mother, would I have the joy of seeing you repent?” Mercedes crying, answered: “I swear, I will do whatever you ask me! God is the witness of my promise!" Laura smiled and said: "Thank you, Jesus! Thank you, Mary! Goodbye, Mother! Now I die happy!" On 22 January 1904, Laura died of her disease, weakened by the physical abuse she previously received from Mora, having offered her life for the salvation of her mother. From 1937 to 1958, Laura's remains lay in the Nequén graveyard, after which they were moved to Bahía Blanca. One of her famous sayings is "Suffer silently and Smile always".

=== Recent studies ===
Bernhard Maier, following the work of Ciro Brugna, says that Laura's popular biographies need revision. Among the points needing revision are the following: that her parents were never married; that her father did not die before the mother left Chile with the two children; and that Laura offered her life for both her parents, as transpires in the notes left by her close friend Maria Mercedes Vera.

== Beatification process ==
The Salesian Sisters of Don Bosco started Laura's canonization process in the 1950s. The congregation commended that duty to the nun Cecilia Genghini, who spent many years collecting information about Laura's life. But she did not see the completion of her work; she died the same year the process began.

One incentive for the congregation was the beatification of Dominic Savio (March 5, 1950) and the canonization of Maria Goretti (June 24, 1950). The progress began in the city of Viedma. But Laura could not be considered a martyr, and because of her young age there was not much hope for her beatification. Nevertheless, in 1981 the application process was completed by the congregation, and on June 5, 1986, she was declared Venerable.

Every candidate for beatification, except in the case of martyrs, must be shown to have obtained a miracle from God when their prayers were invoked. In Laura's case, the requisite miracle concerned the nun Ofelia del Carmen Lobos Arellano. In August 1955, doctors told Sister Ofelia that she would die of lung cancer in a few months, but when she confidently invoked Laura's prayers, the disease disappeared. September 3, 1988, saw Laura's beatification by Pope John Paul II. Her feast day is celebrated on 22 January.

In the 2004 edition of the Roman Martyrology, Laura is listed under 22 January with the citation: "Born in the city of Santiago, Chile, and a pupil of the Institute of Mary Help of Christians; for the conversion of her mother, she made an oblation of her life to God at the age of 13".

== Photograph ==
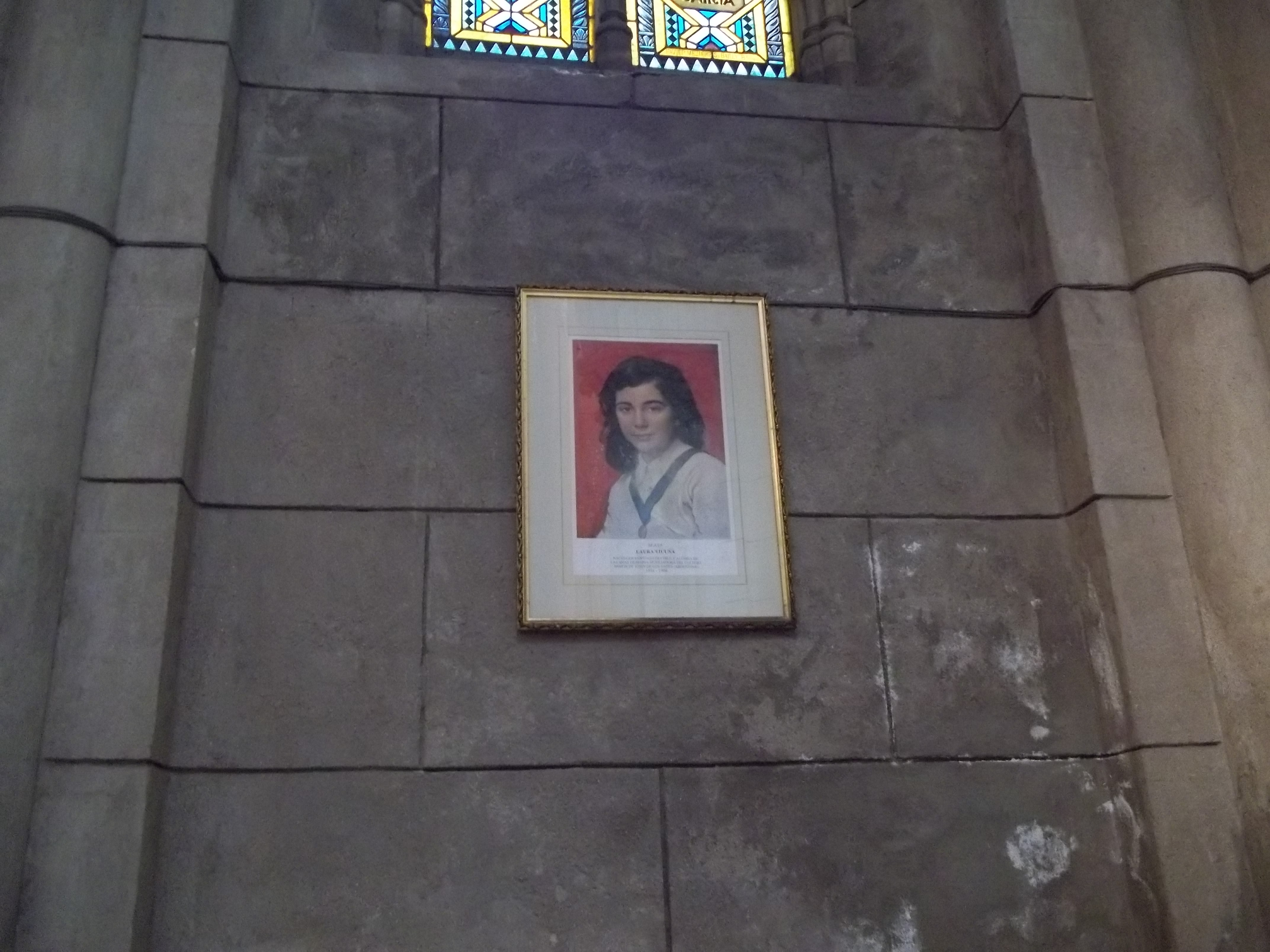
A traditional depiction of Laura Vicuña.

No photograph of Laura was known until recently, when a group photograph taken at her school was discovered showing her true appearance. A likeness of her had been painted by Italian artist Caffaro Rore based on descriptions by her sister Julia, depicting her as a dark-haired girl with European features. Church depictions have been changed to more accurately portray her as a serious-looking mestizo child.

== Shrine ==
The primary shrine for Laura Vicuña is located at Renca Hill, a park of 30 hectares lying between the communes of Quilicura and Renca in Santiago, Chile. The chapel has a capacity of 100. On December 9, 1999, a shrine in the city of Junín de los Andes was inaugurated and dedicated to her memory.

There is also a small sanctuary in the village of El Durazno near the town of Combarbalá in the Coquimbo Region, where Laura spent part of her early childhood. Local people contributed 200 blocks of adobe each for the construction of the sanctuary.

== Memorials ==
=== Philippines ===
In the Philippines, there is a brass tribute memorial statue together with St. John Bosco and St. Dominic Savio were located in St. John Bosco Parish Church in Makati City, Metro Manila, and also a colored tribute memorial statue located in Barangay Don Bosco beside PNCC Skyway Bldg. and near SM Bicutan in Parañaque City, Metro Manila. Another concrete statue stands at Mary Help of Christians College in Canlubang, Calamba City, Laguna.

The Laura Vicuña Women Development and Training Center in Victorias City, Negros Occidental was named after her and is managed by the Daughters of Mary Help of Christians. Another concrete statue of Laura stands near the entrance gate of the school.

== Bibliography ==
=== Sources ===
- CRESTANELLO Augusto. Vida de Laura Vicuña, alumna de las Hijas de María Auxiliadora e Hija de María Inmaculada. Santiago, Escuela tip. Gratitud nacional 1911. Also in Ciro Brugna - Ricardo M. Román, Laura del Carmen Vicuña. Una adolescente heroica,335-360. [The text may be found in its entirety in Appendix III of C. Brugna, Aportes...]
- CRESTANELLO Augusto and Félix ORTIZ. Apuntes. 76 pp. [The text may be found in its entirety in Appendix I of C. Brugna, Aportes...] [Also in Ciro Brugna - Ricardo M. Román, Laura del Carmen Vicuña. Una adolescente heroica, pp. 249–291, according to Maier, Laura del Carmen Vicuña: Kleine Heldin und Heilige, pp. 31–32.]
- VERA, Maria Mercedes. La carta de 1910. In Ciro Brugna - Ricardo M. Román, Laura del Carmen Vicuña. Una adolescente heroica, pp. 143–146. [Cf. Maier p. 32.]
- RUIZ Carmen. El quaderno de Carmen. 36 pp, undated. [The text may be found in its entirety in Appendix II of C. Brugna, Aportes...] [Also in Ciro Brugna - Ricardo M. Román, Laura del Carmen Vicuña. Una adolescente heroica, pp. 293–333, according to Maier pp. 32–33.]

=== Secondary ===
- D'AURIA Luciana. O yo o nadie. Con Laura in camino. Barcelona, n.d.
- BECCALOSSI, M.L. El mensaje de Laura Vicuña. A las jovenes de ayer, de hoy, de mañana. n.d.
- PUTTINI MORETTI Maddalena. Sulle Ande. Torino: Società Editrice Internazionale, 1924.
- PUTTINI MORETTI Maddalena. Bocciolo di rosa, ossia Laura de Vicuña, elettissimo fiore della Missione Salesiana Andina. Nizza Monferrato: Istituto FMA, 1926.
- BLANCO José M., Laura, la flor del Paraíso, Buenos Aires, Sebastián de Amorrortu 1927.
- FMA, Fleur des Andes, Laura de Vicuña. Histoire vécue, Liège, École prof. Saint-Jean Berchmans, 1939.
- NEMBRI Alba, Breve vita di Laura Vicuña, Collana “Fiori di cielo” 152, Torino, L.I.C.E. – R. Berruti, 1943.
- NEMBRI Alba, Candido olocausto, Collana “Letture Cattoliche” 1105, Torino, Società Editrice Internazionale 1945.
- FIERO TORRES Rodolfo, El Angel del Neuquén Laura Vicuña, Colección “Las Florecillas” 10, Madrid, Ibérica 1949.
- FIERO TORRES Rodolfo, L’angelo del Neuquén Laura Vicuña, Torino, L.I.C.E. 1953 [traduzione dallo spagnolo in italiano].
- GIANONI Ernesta, Laura Vicuña, alumna interna en Junín de los Andes de las hijas de María Auxiliadora, modelo de hija, de colegiala y la pequeña apostol, Barcelonoa, Esculeas prof. salesianas 1953.
- PUTTINI MORETTI Maddalena. Bocciolo di rosa, ossia Laura de Vicuña. Torino: L.I.C.E. – R. Berruti 1953, 2° ed.
- BIEDERMANN Angela, Una ragazzina “fuori serie”. Laura Vicuña, alunna della Figlie di Maria Ausiliatrice (Salesiane di Don Bosco), Torino, Istituto FMA 1955.
- BIEDERMANN Angela. Eine, nicht wie allen andern. Laura Vicuña, Schülerin der Don Bosco Schwestern. Tr. by the Austrian Province of the FMA.
- ARONICA Paul, Rose of the Andes. A biography of the servant of God Laura Vicuña, Paterson N.J., Salesiana Publishers 1957.
- BIEDERMANN Angela, Un fiore di vetta. Laura Vicuña, alunna delle Figlie di Maria Ausiliatrice (Salesiane di Don Bosco), Torino, Istituto FMA 1957.
- FMA, Laure, élève des Filles de Marie Auxiliatrice (Salésiennes de don Bosco), Paris, E. Desfossés-Néogravure 1957.
- CASTANO Luigi, Laura Vicuña. L’eroica Figlia di Maria delle Ande Patagoniche, Torino, Società Editrice Internazionale 1958.
- ENTRAIGAS Raul, La azucena de los Andes, Buenos Aires: Ed. Don Bosco, 1958. 1959, 2° ed.
- FORNARA Flora, Laura Vicuña. Il piccolo fiore delle Ande, Collana “Fiori del cielo” 22, Bari, Ed. Paoline 1959, 2° ed.
- CASTANO Luigi. Laura Vicuña. Sevilla: Ed. María Auxiliadora, 1960.
- BRESSAN Gemma, Un’anima di luce. Laura Vicuña, Torino, Istituto FMA 1960.
- PESCI Caterina – GIUDICI Maria Pia, Per te mamma. Disegni di Emilio Fiorio. Testo di C. Pesci – M. Giudici, Colle Don Bosco (Asti), Istituto Salesiano Arti Grafiche 1961 (Albo).
- LORENZINI Giacomo, La preadolescenza e la capacità di esercitare virtù eroiche secondo le indagini della psicologia odierna, con riferimento alla Serva di Dio, Laura Vicuña (1891-1904), Collana “Quaderni delle FMA” 6, Torino, Istituto FMA 1962.
- KLEIN Jan, Leven om leven. Laura Vicuña Klein Zuiderkruis, Groot- Bijgaarden Club 1963.
- GRASSIANO M. Domenica, Volle morire per salvare la mamma (Laura del Carmine Vicuña), Collana “Candelabro”, Leumann (Torino), Elle Di Ci 1964.
- MULLIGAN Francis, Greater love. Laura Vicuña the Angel of the Andes, Madras, St. Joseph’s Technical School 1965.
- SACRA PRO CAUSIS SANCTORUM CONGREGATIONE, Viedmen, Beatificationis et Canonizationis Servae Dei Laurae Vicuña, Virginis Filiae Mariae, alumnae Instituti Filiarum Mariae Auxiliatricis, Positio super causae introductione, Roma, Tipografia Guerra et Belli 1969.
- CORREA LEITE Marilia, Laura Vicuña, Campo Grande (Brasil), Centro Laura Vicuña, 1974.
- LUBICH Gino – TREVISAN Giorgio, Laura e il suo segreto. Laura Vicuña allieva delle Figlie di Maria Ausiliatrice di Junín de los Andes-Argentina, Leumann (Torino), Elle Di Ci 1982.
- LUBICH Gino – TREVISAN Giorgio, Laura und ihr Geheimnis. Laura Vicuña, Schülerin der DonBosco-Schwestern in Junin de los Andes - Argentinien, (übersetzung aus dem Italienischen: DonBosco-Schwestern Österreich) Innsbruck [1982].
- [LUBICH Gino – TREVISAN Giorgio], Laura’s gemeim. Laura Vicuña leerlige van de Dochters van Maria Hulp Zusters van Don Bosco in Junín de los Andes – Argentinië, (traduzione dall’italiano in lingua olandese) Leumann (Turijn – Italië) 1982.
- PAOLINI Consuelo, іMi amiga Laura! Laura Vicuña, Caracas, Librería Editorial Salesiana 1982.
- CASTANO Luigi, Laura, la ragazza delle Ande Patagoniche. Laura Vicuña 1891-1904. Alunna delle Figlie di Maria Ausiliatrice, Leumann (Torino), Elle Di Ci 1983, 2° ed.
- GRASSIANO M. Domenica, La mia vita per la mamma. Laura del Carmine Vicuña, Leumann (Torino), Elle Di Ci 1983, 2° ed.
- SACRA CONGRAGATIO PRO CAUSIS SANCTORUM, Viedmen. Beatificationis et Canonizationis Servae Dei Laurae Vicuña, Virginis Filiae Mariae, alumnae Instituti Filiarum Mariae Auxiliatricis (1891-1904), Positio super virtutibus, [Roma Tipografia Guerra et Belli 1983].
- LAPPIN Peter, The Falcon and the Dove. The story of Laura Vicuña, New York, Don Bosco Publications 1984; 1985, 180 pages, ISBN 0899440673, 9780899440675.
- SCHEPPING Johanna. Laura – das Mädchen aus den Anden. Mit 18 documentarbildern. Innsbruck/Wien, Tyrolia-Verlag 1984.4° ed. 1988.
- D’AURIA Luciana. Io e nessun altro. Con Laura in cammino. Leumann (Torino), Elle Di Ci 1987.
- ACCORNERO Giuliana, Laura Vicuña. Morire a 12 anni per salvare la madre, in Jesus 10 (1988) 1, 103-104.
- BECCALOSSI Maria Lucia, Il messaggio di Laura alle giovani di ieri, di oggi, di domani. Collana “Ragazzi al traguardo” 7, Leumann (Torino), Elle Di Ci 1988, 2° ed.
- CASTANO Luigi, Tredicenne sugli altari. Beata Laura Vicuña. Alunna delle Figlie di Maria Ausiliatrice nelle Missioni Patagoniche, 1891-1904, Leumann (Torino) Elle Di Ci 1988, 3° ed.
- CONGREGATIO PRO CAUSIS SANCTORUM, Viedmensis Canonizationis Venerabilis Servae Dei Laurae Vicuña, virginis saecularis, alumnae Instituti Filiarum Mariae Auxiliatricis (1891-1904). Positio super miraculo, Roma, Tipografia Guerra s.r.l., 1988.
- DOSIO Maria. "La 'vicenda religiosa' di Laura Vicuña (1891-1904) sullo sfondo della religiosità preadolescenziale." Rivista di Scienze dell’Educazione 26/1 (1988) 27-66. [il testo si trova nella Banca dati FMA]
- DOSIO Maria. "Fecondità di un metodo educativo: La Beata Laura Vicuña." Rivista di Scienze dell'Educazione 26/3 (1988) 337-351.
- DOSIO Maria, La spiritualità mariana di Laura Vicuña (1891-1904), in MANELLO Maria Piera (a cura di), Madre ed educatrice. Contributi sull’identità marana dell’Istituto delle Figlie di Maria Ausiliatrice, Collana “Il prisma” 8, Roma, LAS 1988, 213-233. [il testo si trova nella Banca dati FMA]
- ELIÉCER Gustavo (a cura di), Beata Laura Vicuña. La hija que ofreció la vida por salvar a la madre, Bogotá, Ed. Don Bosco 1988.
- GIOVANNI PAOLO II, Omelia di Beatificazione di Laura Vicuña, Colle Don Bosco (Torino) il 3 settembre 1988, in https://www.vatican.va/holy_father/john_paul_ii/homilies/1988/documents/hf_jpii_hom_19880903_colle-don-bosco_it.html
- EMRINO Ricardo, Laura Vicuña: un camino latinoamericano a la santidad, Bahía Blanca, Editoria del Sur 1988.
- PESCI Caterina, Per te, mamma! Dramma in tre atti della vita di Laura Vicuña, Collana “EG” 26, Leumann (Torino) Elle Di Ci 1988.
- Laura Vicuña. Disegni di E. Tonelli, Leumann (Torino), Elle Di Ci, 1988 (Albo).
- LUBICH Gino – TREVISAN Giorgio, Laura e il suo segreto. Laura Vicuña allieva delle Figlie di Maria Ausiliatrice di Junín de los Andes-Argentina, Leumann (Torino), Elle Di Ci 19882 [Albo a fumetti].
- REDAZIONE PRIMAVERA (a cura di), La canzone di Laura. 13 anni pieni d’amore, Cinisello Balsamo (Milano), Ed. Primavera 1988 [il testo si trova nella Banca dati FMA]
- YANAGIYA Keiko, Andes no tenshi (L’angelo delle Ande), Tokyo, Don Bosco Sha 1988.
- BRUGNA Ciro. Aportes para el conocimiento de Laura Vicuña. Buenos Aires, Instituto Salesiano de Artes Gráficas, 1990.
- CASTANO Luigi, Santità e martirio di Laura Vicuña, Roma, Istituto FMA 1990.
- SECCO Michelina, Donne in controluce sul cammino di Laura Vicuña, Roma, Istituto FMA 1990.
- BECCALOSSI Maria Lucia, I giorni di Laura. Le persone, i luoghi, gli avvenimenti che segnarono la vita di Laura Vicuña, Leumann (Torino), Elle Di Ci 1991.
- BRUGNA Ciro. Laura Vicuña. Una santidad juvenil (1891-1904). Santiago, Editorial Salesiana 1992.
- GRISA Laura, La rosa di mezzanotte: Laura Vicuña, Collana “EG” 39, Leumann (Torino), Elle Di Ci 1993 (Dramma).
- BRUGNA Ciro. Laura Vicuña y Juan Cagliero. En coincidentes caminos del Neuquén, Argentina (años 1899-1902). Temuco (Chile), 1994.
- La flor de la Patagonia. Laura Vicuña, Colección “Los aventureros de Dios” Series Testimonios 1, Adrogué, Producciónes Cruz de Sur 1994 (Albo).
- BRUGNA Ciro – ROMÁN Ricardo M. Laura del Carmen Vicuña. Una adolescente heroica. Buenos Aires, Inst. Salesiano de Artes Gráficas, 1995.
- GONZALES Antonio. Laura Vicuña. Biografías salesianas, serie minor. Madrid, 1995.
- AUBRY Joseph, Laura Vicuña eroina per amore a 13 anni, Collana “Don Bosco” 6, Leumann (Torino), Elle Di Ci 1996.
- COLODRERO María Díaz. Laura Vicuña. Con la fuerza del amor. Collección argentinos de santidad. Rosario, 2000.
- "Laura Vicuña (22 gennaio)," in BUTLER Alban, Il primo grande Dizionario dei Santi secondo il Calendario. Casale Monferrato (AL) Piemme 2001, 94-95.
- PRODINGER Angelika, tr. Lauras geheimer Weg. Oder: Wie man ein/e Held/in wird. Junge Talente im Don Bosco-Gymnasium Unterwaltersdorf. Wien 2002.
- AUBRY Joseph, Laura Vicuña, Collana “Testimoni” 20, Leumann (Torino) Elle Di Ci 2004.
- BECCALOSSI Maria Lucia. I giorni di Laura. Le persone, i luoghi, gli avvenimenti che segnarono la vita di Laura Vicuña. Leumann (Torino) Elle Di Ci, 2004, 2° ed.
- DOSIO Maria. Laura Vicuña. Un cammino di santità giovanile salesiana. Collana “Orizzonti” 18. Roma: LAS, 2004. [due contributi si trovano nella Banca dati FMA:
  - Laura Vicuña: potenza d’amore, pp. 139–162
  - Laura Vicuña e Maria Goretti. Il sì radicale a Dio di due adolescenti, pp. 163–183]
- FAGIOLO D'ATTILIA Miela. Laurita delle Ande. Vita di Laura Vicuña. Milano, Edizioni Paoline 2004.
- MAIER Bernhard, Laura del Carmen Vicuña. Kleine Heldin und Heilige. Einige Ergebnisse der neueren Lauraforschung, Hollabrunn: Verlag MBC, 2004. 2018 2° ed. ISBN 3-9500764-4-1.
- COLLINO Maria. "Beata Laura Vicuña: Un forte sì alla vita." Rivista Maria Ausiliatrice 2004-5 cf. http://www.donbosco-torino.it/ita/Kairos/Santo_del_mese/01-Gennaio/5-B_Laura_Vicu%F1a%20.html
- SICARI Antonio Maria. "Santa [sic] Laura Vicuña (1891-1904)." in ID., Il secondo grande libro dei ritratti di santi. (Milano: Jaca Book, 2006) 569-584.
- "Laura Vicuña," in SCUDU Mario, Anche Dio ha i suoi campioni, Leumann (Torino) Elle Di Ci, 2011.
- RUSSO Claudio. Beata Laura Vicuña. Con la grazia si può trionfare sul male. Leumann (Torino) Elle Di Ci, 2013.
