= Mary Help of Christians School =

Mary Help of Christians School may refer to:

Republic of Ireland

- Mary Help of Christians Girls National School (Dublin)

Philippines

- Mary Help of Christians School (Canlubang), Inc.

United States

- Mary Help of Christians Academy, North Haledon, New Jersey
- Mary Help of Christians Catholic School, Parkland, Florida
- Mary Help of Christians School, Laredo, Texas
- St. Mary Help of Christians Catholic School, Aiken, South Carolina
