= Salesian Sisters =

The title Salesian Sisters may refer to one of these Roman Catholic orders for women:

- Salesian Sisters of Don Bosco, also known as Daughters of Mary Help of Christians, founded in 1872
- Order of the Visitation of Holy Mary, also known as Visitationists, founded by in 1610 by Saint Francis de Sales and Saint Jane Frances de Chantal
