= List of Guatemalan records in track cycling =

The following are the national records in track cycling in Guatemala maintained by its national cycling federation: Federación Guatemalteca de Ciclismo.

== Men ==
Event	Record	Athlete	Date	Meet	Place	Ref
Flying 200 m time trial	9.706	Brandon Pineda	6 September 2019	Pan American Championships	Cochabamba, Bolivia	
1 km time trial	1:01.057	Luis Carlos Cordon	2 September 2018	Pan American Championships	Aguascalientes, Mexico	
Team sprint	46.207	Brandon Pineda; Claudio Castro; Luis Cordon	21 November 2017	Bolivarian Games	Cali, Colombia	
4000m individual pursuit	4:26.271	Dorian Javier Monterroso	7 October 2016	Pan American Championships	Aguascalientes, Mexico	
4000m team pursuit	4:14.795	Julio Padilla; Manuel Oseas Rodas; Christian Amilc Quicibal; Romeo Daniel Quicibal	8 February 2013	Pan American Championships	Mexico City, Mexico	

== Women ==
Event	Record	Athlete	Date	Meet	Place	Ref
Flying 200 m time trial	10.869	Joanne Rodríguez	5 September 2019	Pan American Championships	Cochabamba, Bolivia	
250 m time trial (standing start)	21.760	Maria Jimenez Galicia	16 July 2015	Pan American Games	Milton, Canada	
500 m time trial	35.697	Yamilet Jimenez	7 October 2016	Pan American Championships	Aguascalientes, Mexico	
Team sprint	36.783		21 November 2017	Bolivarian Games	Cali, Colombia	
3000m individual pursuit						
4000m team pursuit	4:57.091	Nicolle Bruderer; Emelyn Galicia Ramirez; Cynthia Lee Lopez; Jasmin Soto Lopez	16 July 2015	Pan American Games	Milton, Canada	
