= María Romero Meneses =

Nicaraguan religious sister (1902–1977)

Blessed María Romero Meneses FMA
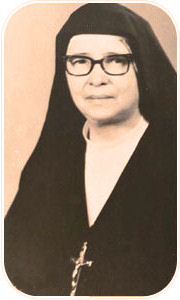

Virgin
- Born: 13 January 1902; Granada, Nicaragua
- Died: 7 July 1977 (age 75); Las Peñitas, León, Nicaragua
- Venerated in: Roman Catholic Church
- Beatified: 14 April 2002, Saint Peter's Square, Vatican City by Pope John Paul II
- Feast: 7 July

María Romero Meneses, FMA (13 January 1902 – 7 July 1977) was a Nicaraguan religious sister of the Salesian Sisters of Don Bosco. Romero Meneses was sometimes called the "Social Apostle of Costa Rica".

Romero Meneses's beatification process started on September 20, 1988, and she was titled as a Servant of God before being named venerable on December 18, 2000. Pope John Paul II beatified her on April 14, 2002.

== Life ==
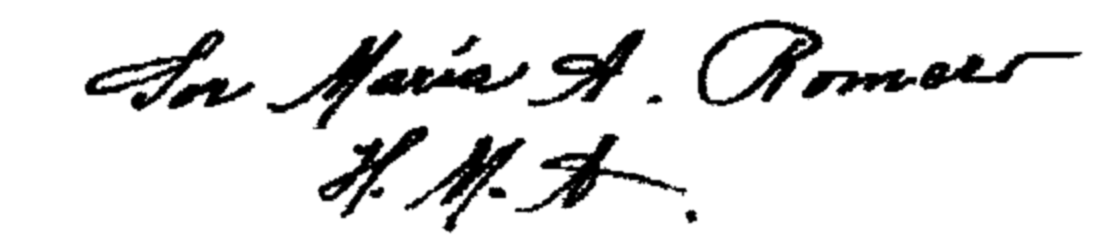
Signature

María Romero Meneses was born in Nicaragua in 1902 as one of eight children to middle-class parents – her father was a government minister. Her parents were Félix Romero Arana and Ana Meneses Blandón. Her baptism was held on January the 20th. She received her Confirmation on July 23, 1904, from Siméon Pereira y Castellón and received her First Communion on December 8, 1909.

Romero was found to have a talent for art and music and so her parents saw to it that she was trained on the piano and the violin. She later attended the Salesian Sisters of Don Bosco's school, although in 1914 she was stricken with a long bout of rheumatic fever which she suffered until 1915 and it left her heart damaged for the remainder of her life. When she recovered it was deemed to be miraculous in nature and this led to a total confidence in Our Lady, Help of Christians and to the vision of her vocation to the order.

The hopeful girl joined the Marian association Daughters of Mary Help of Christians on December 8, 1915, to follow her Marian call. In 1920 she joined that congregation and left for El Salvador for her novitiate, receiving the habit of the congregation on January 16, 1921. On 6 January 1929 in Nicaragua she made her perpetual vows. Romero Meneses's writings indicate that she attempted to live the religious interior life after the example of John Bosco.

In 1931 she went to San José, Costa Rica which became her second homeland and at 1933 was a teacher of music and art as well as typing in a school for the daughters of rich families. A great number of her students were won over to her mode of life and worked with her to help the poor and the abandoned. Her focus was on social development while helping the rich to see if the latter could help the poor with their wealth. She set up recreational centers in 1945 as well as food distribution centers in 1953. She also set up a school for poor girls in 1961 and a clinic in 1966 for ill people. In 1973 she organized the construction of seven homes which became the foundation of the village of Centro San José – a place where poor families could have decent homes.

Romero died of a heart attack in mid-1977 in the Salesian Sisters house in León where she had been sent for a rest. Her mortal remains were sent back to San José in Costa Rica to be buried in the chapel at a Salesian house.

== Beatification ==
The beatification process started on 20 September 1988 once the Congregation for the Causes of Saints issued the nihil obstat to the cause and titled her as a Servant of God. The Congregation for the Causes of Saints validated the process on 8 January 1993 and received the positio in 1997.

Romero Meneses was named as venerable on 18 December 2000 after Pope John Paul II approved that she had lived a life of heroic virtue. The process for investigating a miracle was approved on 3 April 2001. John Paul II beatified Romero Meneses on 14 April 2002 in Saint Peter's Square. She was the first individual born in Central America to be beatified. The postulator for this cause is Pierluigi Cameroni.
