= Jannat Al Ghezi =

Iraqi activist and Woman of Courage 2017

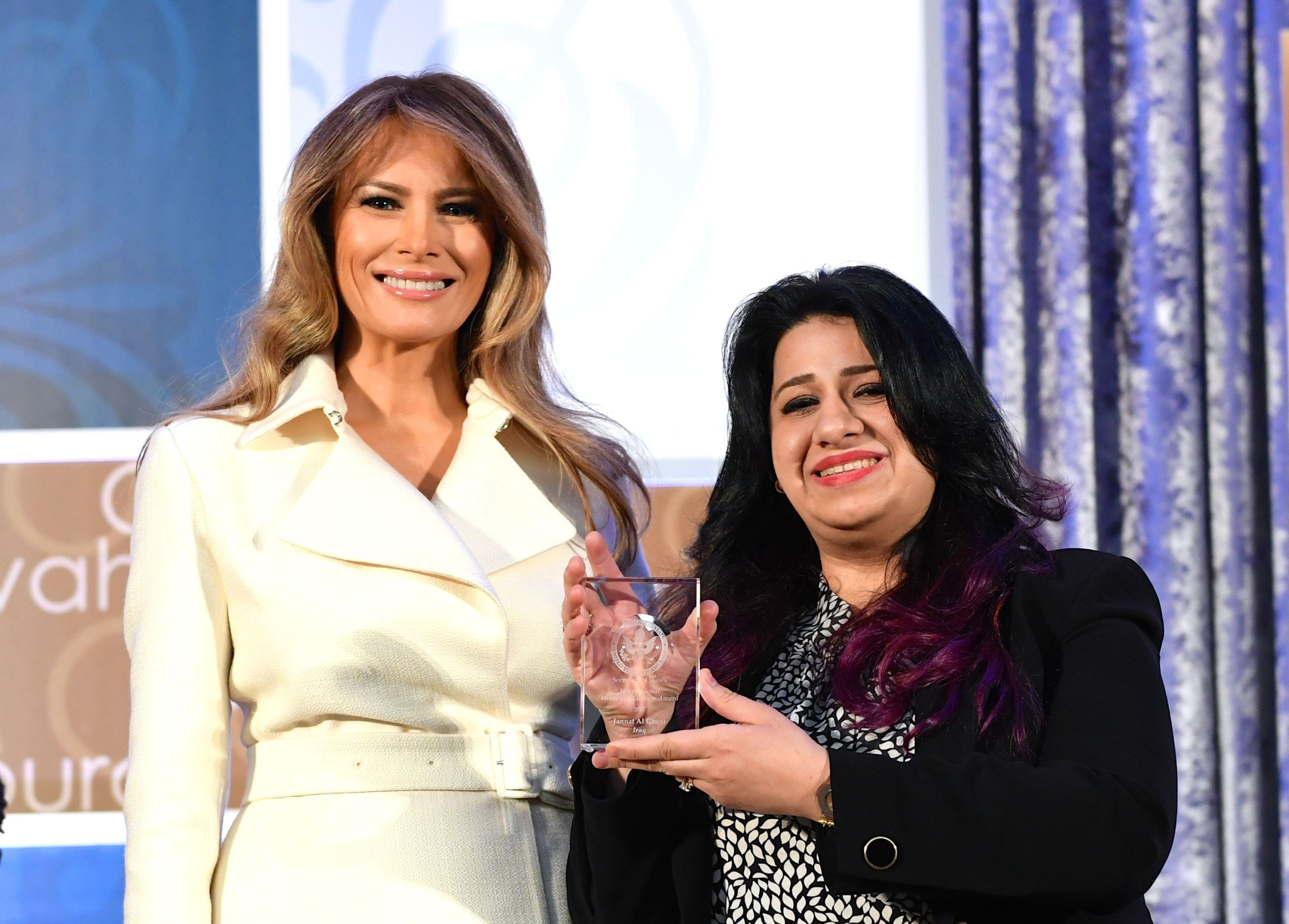
- Jannat Al Ghezi with Melania Trump at the International Women of Courage Award 2017
- Known for: Human rights activist

Jannat Al Ghezi (Arabic: جنات الغزي) is an Iraqi human right activist and the Deputy Director of Organization of Women's Freedom in Iraq. She and her organization help people caught in the Iraqi Civil War and they helped Yazidis and women of other cultures escape from the Islamic State in Iraq and the Levant despite the grave risk involved. They also help Iraqi women deal with domestic violence. Jannat was herself a survivor of domestic violence from her tribal family which believed she had dishonoured them. She is an International Women of Courage Award recipient.

After the award she visited other cities including a reception in Minnesota with fellow award winner Sister Carol.
