= Mary Help of Christians College - Salesian Sisters =

Christian college in Laguna, Philippines

Mary Help of Christians College - Canlubang, Salesian Sisters Inc.

Location
- Acacia St., Ceris I, Canlubang, Calamba, Laguna; Philippines
- Coordinates: 14°12′34″N 121°06′50″E

Information
- Type: Sectarian, Salesian Sisters of St. John Bosco, Salesian School, Catholic School
- Motto: Once a Batang Mary Help, always a Batang Mary Help
- Established: June 1973
- Administrator: MHCC Middle Administrators: Mr. Christian Dave Alberto; Ms. Ma. Betina Cecilia Contreras; Ms. Joann Alcantara; Mr. Robert Sonny Tagle; Ms. Joenie Mae Gonzales; Sr. Joralyn Selloria, FMA
- Principal: Ms. Maresty Veracruz
- Gender: CoEd
- Colors: Pink and Blue
- Athletics: Yes
- Nickname: Batang Mary Help (BMH)
- Accreditation: PAASCU Level III
- Website: https://maryhelpcanlubang.com

Mary Help of Christians College - Salesian Sisters Inc. (formally, Mary Help of Christians School) is an educational sectarian institution in Calamba, Laguna, in the Philippines. They are the first in Laguna and only in Calamba to be PAASCU Accredited Level III

The school is administered by the Daughters of Mary Help of Christian (Italian:Figlie di Maria Ausiliatrice or FMA), also known as Salesian Sisters of Don Bosco (FMA).
