= Carolin Tahhan Fachakh =

Syrian nun who cared for women and children in Damascus during the Syrian Civil War

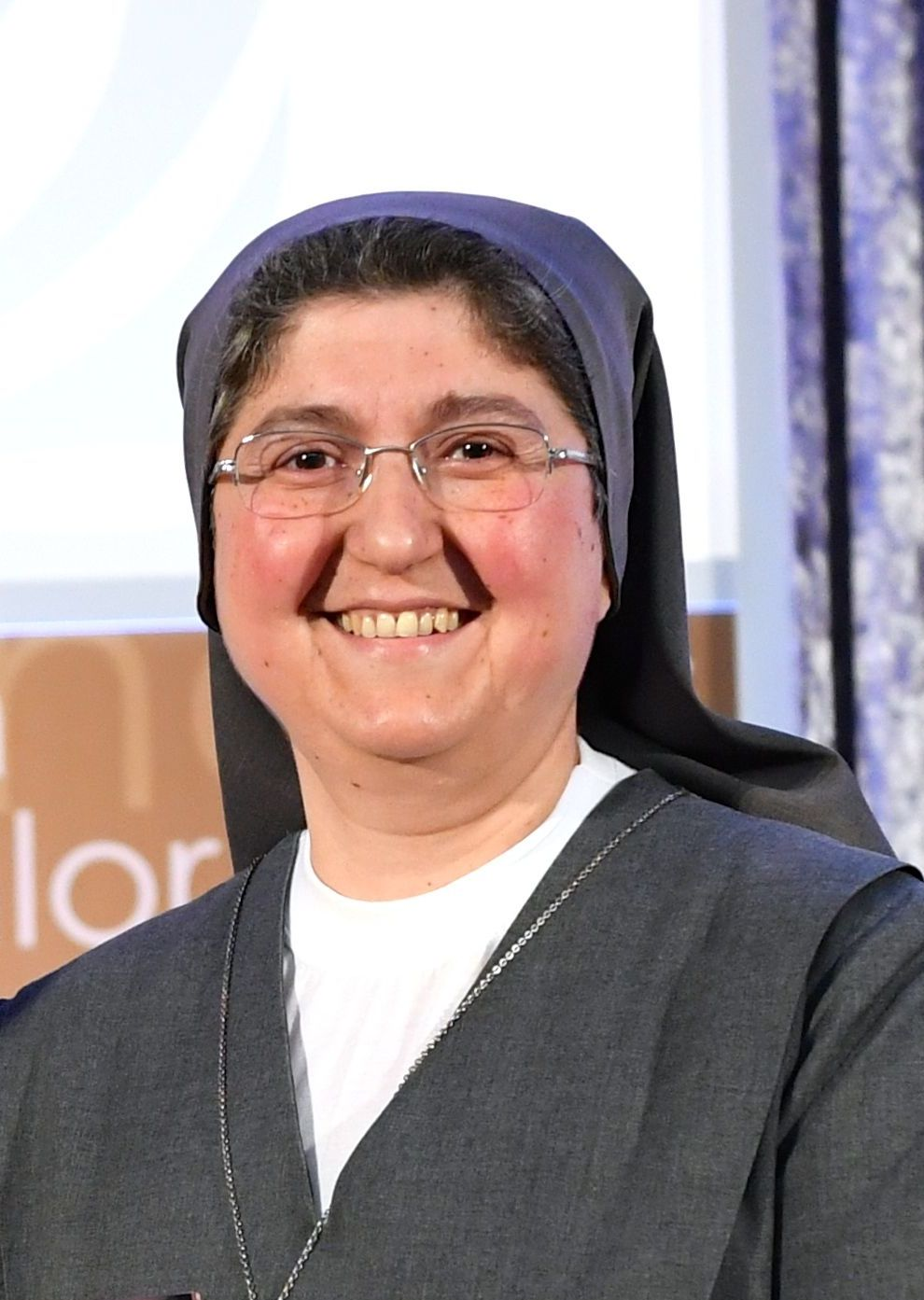
- Sister Carol
- Born: Aleppo
- Other names: Sister Carol
- Occupation: Nun
- Known for: work in Damascus

Carolin Tahhan Fachakh or Sister Carol, is a Syrian nun who cared for women and children in Damascus during the Syrian Civil War. She was awarded an International Women of Courage Award in 2017.

== Life ==
Fachakh was born in Aleppo. She joined the Salesian Sisters of Don Bosco and became known as "Sister Carol". She ran a nursery school in Damascus that has remained open during the Syrian Civil War. The school is open to mothers and children irrespective of religion. The sisters also teach mothers to sew.

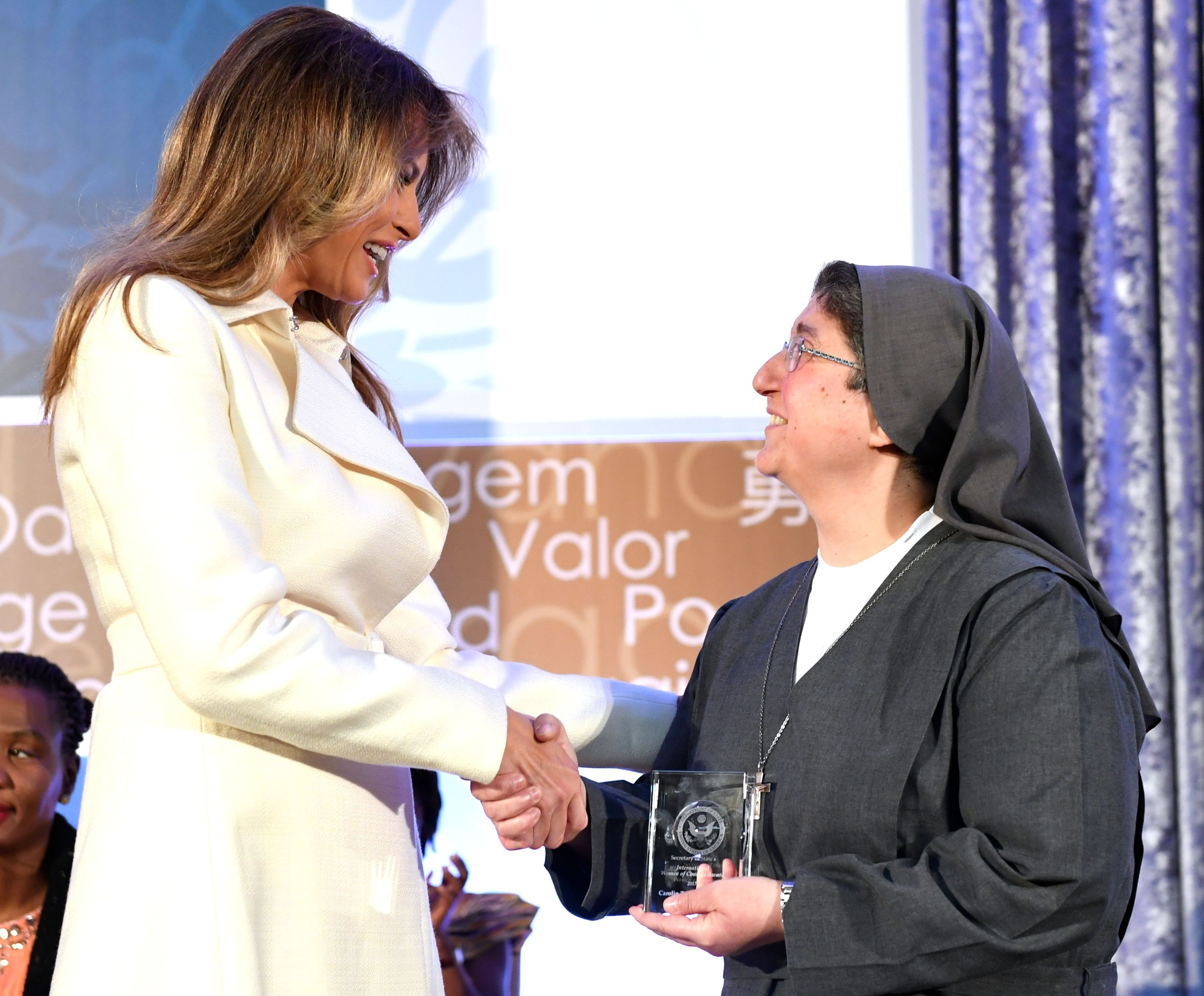
Receiving her award from Melania Trump

In March 2017 the work of Sister Carol was recognised by the United States Secretary of State who awarded her an International Women of Courage Award. The award was given to her by the First Lady Melania Trump. Sister Carol who had been nominated by the Vatican under President Barack Obama. She spoke out against President Trump two weeks after the award. She said that he was making a mistake in bombing and she was in support of the Syrian president Bashar al-Assad.

Fachakh doubted that Bashar al-Assad had ordered the Khan Shaykhun chemical attack that had gassed Syrian civilians. She told the press that the retaliatory attack by Trump was "a step back from peace". She said that she liked the Syrian President. After the award Fachakh visited other cities including a reception in Minnesota with fellow award winner Jannat Al Ghezi.
