= Maria Troncatti =

Italian beatified woman

Saint Maria Troncatti FMA
- Born: 16 February 1883; Corteno Golgi, Brescia, Kingdom of Italy
- Died: 25 August 1969 (aged 86); Sucúa, Morona-Santiago, Ecuador
- Venerated in: Roman Catholic Church
- Beatified: 24 November 2012, Coliseo La Loma, Macas, Morona-Santiago, Ecuador by Cardinal Angelo Amato
- Canonized: 19 October 2025, Saint Peter's Square, Vatican City by Pope Leo XIV
- Feast: 25 August

Maria Troncatti, FMA (16 February 1883 – 25 August 1969) was an Italian Catholic member of the Salesian Sisters of Don Bosco. Troncatti was from a farming family and entered that congregation in 1907; she worked as a nurse during World War I and became part of the missions in Ecuador from 1922 until her death in a plane crash in 1969. Troncatti was beatified on 24 November 2012 and canonized on 19 October 2025.

== Life ==
Maria Troncatti was born in Italy in 1883 to poor farming parents.

She attended catechism lessons in her local parish during her childhood and in obedience to her priest decided to wait until adulthood before requesting to be admitted into the Salesian Sisters.

Troncatti joined the Salesian Sisters of Don Bosco on 15 October 1905 after having commenced her novitiate and professed her vows on 17 November, 1908 in Nizza Monferrato. Her father fainted as she left due to the pain of separation. She spent this time in Varazze in Liguria. Troncatti suffered a serious infection in 1909 and later contracted typhoid; this prompted a visit from Michele Rua who blessed her. In 1915 she passed a special course in nursing and used this education during World War I as she tended to ill and wounded soldiers - she also worked for the Red Cross while stationed in Varazze.

Troncatti was sent to the missions in Ecuador on 9 November 1922 for a mission of evangelization to work among the Shuar people in the Amazon forest; after she established herself there, tribal members dubbed her, “Mamacita". En route to Ecuador, she and her fellow religious boarded a train to Marseille and spent over two weeks on a boat to Panama; she then went to Guayaquil in December and then on to Ecuador. Her first encounter with them threatened her life: the tribal chief's daughter was wounded from a bullet caught in the crossfire between two warring tribes, and she was threatened with death if she could not save the girl; Troncatti operated and saved the girl's life in a move that bought Troncatti the respect and admiration of the natives. She also served in Ecuador as a catechist and nurse. Before she turned 85 in 1968 she penned a letter to her relations back home in Brescia and said that – despite their wishes to reunite with her – her age made travel difficult and she could not leave due to her mission.

Troncatti died on 25 August 1969 in a plane crash in Ecuador. The small plane crashed not long after takeoff on the edge of the forest that she had dubbed the "homeland of the heart". Two other religious were in that plane and managed to survive; the three were en route to Quito for an annual spiritual retreat.

== Beatification process ==
The diocesan process was inaugurated on 7 September 1986 and concluded its business on 25 October 1987. On 12 November 2008 her heroic virtue and Pope Benedict XVI declared Troncatti to be venerable. A miracle due to the intercession of Maria Troncatti was the cure of Josefa Yolanda Solórzano Pisco. Troncatti was beatified on 24 November 2012 in Ecuador with Cardinal Angelo Amato presiding over the celebration on the behalf of the pope. A second miracle was investigated and the process was approved by Pope Francis on 25 November 2024. The postulator for this cause was Pierluigi Carmeroni. She was canonized by Pope Leo XIV on 19 October 2025.
