= Cerro Renca =

Mountain in Chile

Coordinates: 33°23′26.66″S 70°42′40.36″W

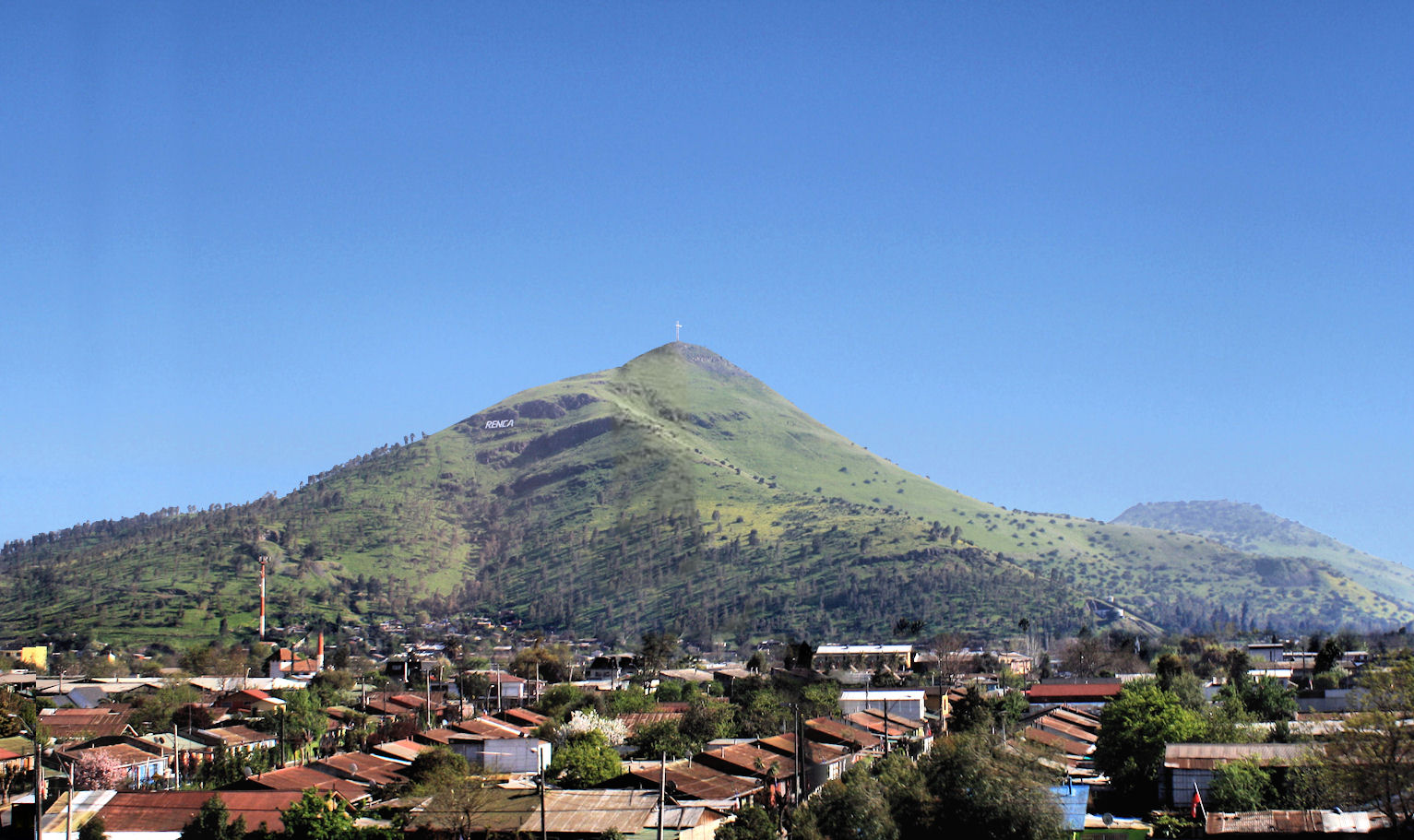
The hill as seen from Costanera Norte

Cerro Renca (Spanish for Renca Hill) is a hill straddling the border between Quilicura to the north and Renca to the south, in the city of Santiago, Chile. This geographic feature rises 300 metres (980 ft) above the surrounding terrain. The hill, which is 905 m (2,969 ft) above sea level at its highest point, has two subsidiaries summits known as Cerro Colorado (720 m (2,360 ft) above sea level) and Puntilla Lo Ruiz (720 m (2,360 ft) above sea level).
