= Claudio Castro =

Chilean politician (born 1983)

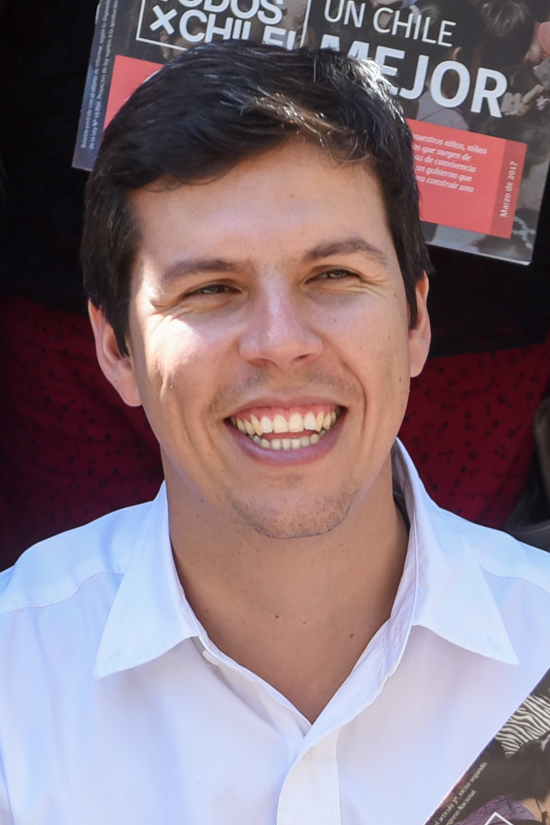

Mayor of Renca
- Incumbent
- Assumed office 6 December 2016
- Preceded by: Vicky Barahona

President of the Pontifical Catholic University of Chile Students Federation
- In office 2005–2006
- Preceded by: Rodrigo de la Calle
- Succeeded by: Fernando Zavala

Personal details
- Born: 26 May 1983 (age 43) Santiago, Chile
- Party: Christian Democratic Party (2011−2019)
- Education: Pontifical Catholic University of Chile; London School of Economics (MA)
- Occupation: Politician
- Profession: Civil engineer

Claudio Nicolás Castro Salas (born 26 May 1983) is a Chilean politician who currently serves as mayor of Renca.
