= Renca =

- City and Commune
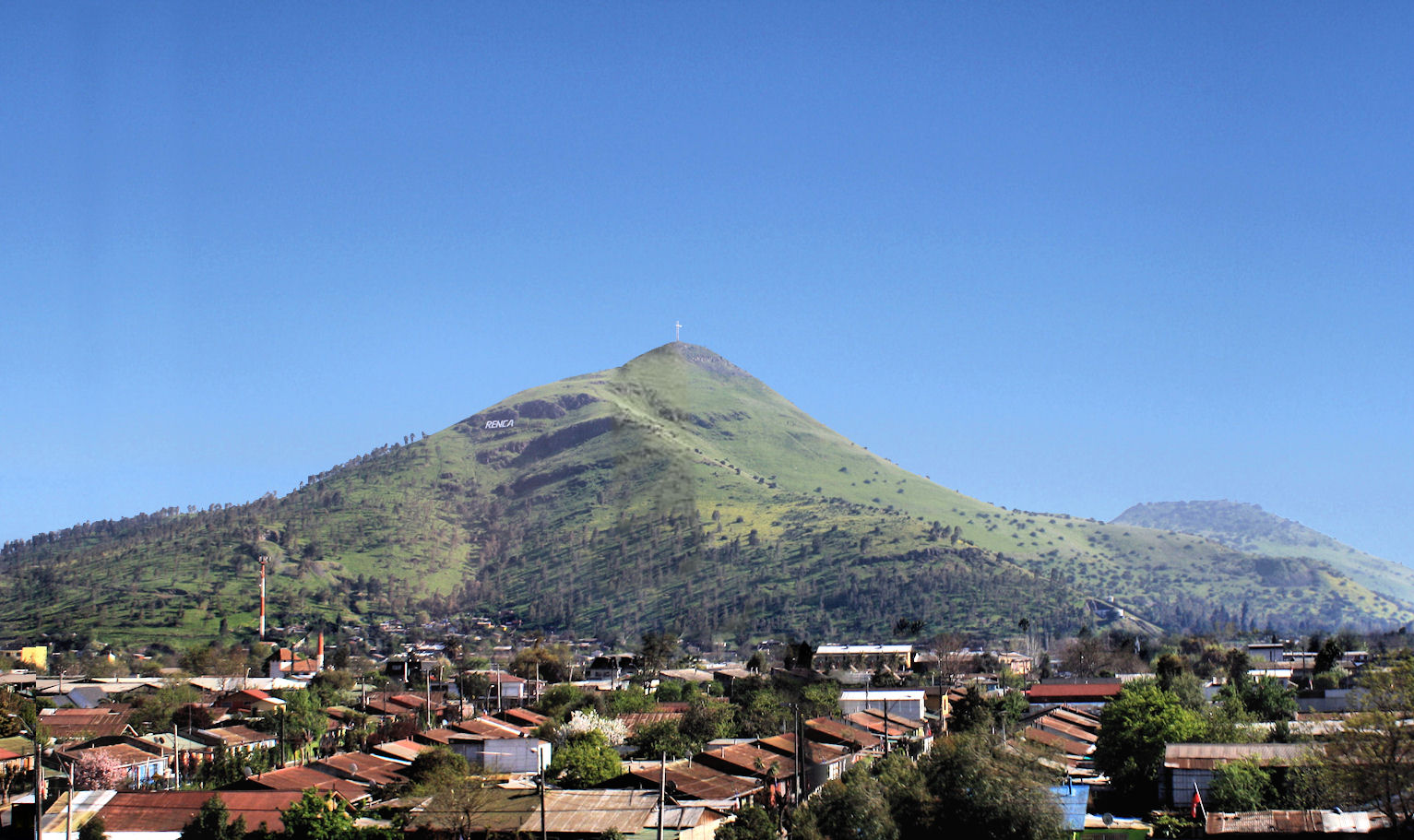
- Renca Hill, in Renca

- Flag Coat of arms

- Map of Renca commune within Greater Santiago

- Location in Chile
- Coordinates (city): 33°24′S 70°43′W
- Country: Chile
- Region: Santiago Metro.
- Province: Santiago
- Founded: 19 March 2000

Government
  - Type: Municipality
  - Alcalde: Claudio Castro (Ind.)

Area
  - Total: 24.2 km^{2} (9.3 sq mi)

Population (2002 Census)
  - Total: 133,518
  - Density: 5,520/km^{2} (14,300/sq mi)
  - Urban: 133,518
  - Rural: 0

Sex
  - Men: 66,253
  - Women: 67,265
- Time zone: UTC-4 (CLT)
  - Summer (DST): UTC-3 (CLST)
- Area code: 56 +
- Website: Municipality of Renca

Renca is a commune of Chile located in Santiago Province, Santiago Metropolitan Region. It was founded on 6 May 1894.

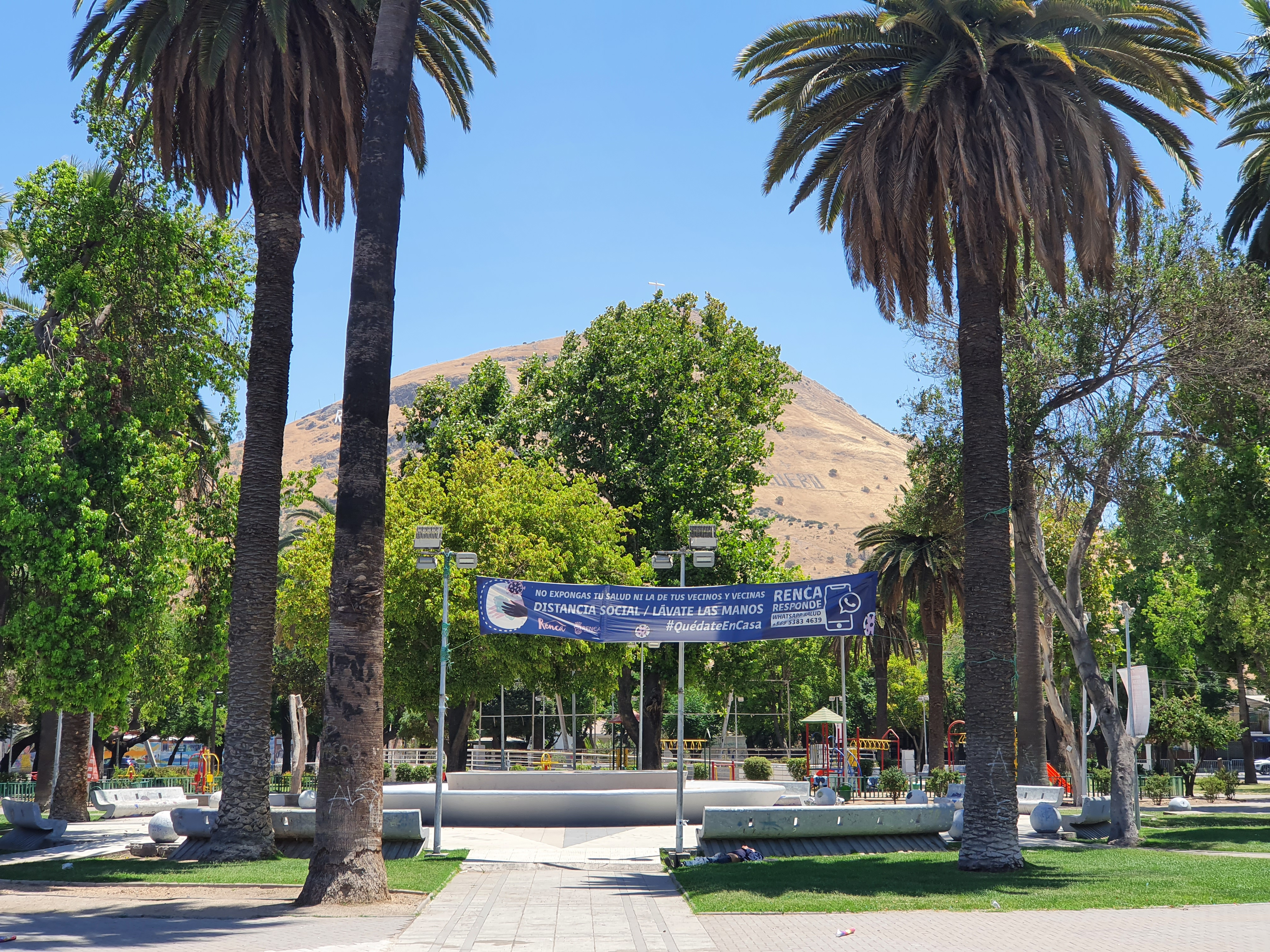
Plaza Renca

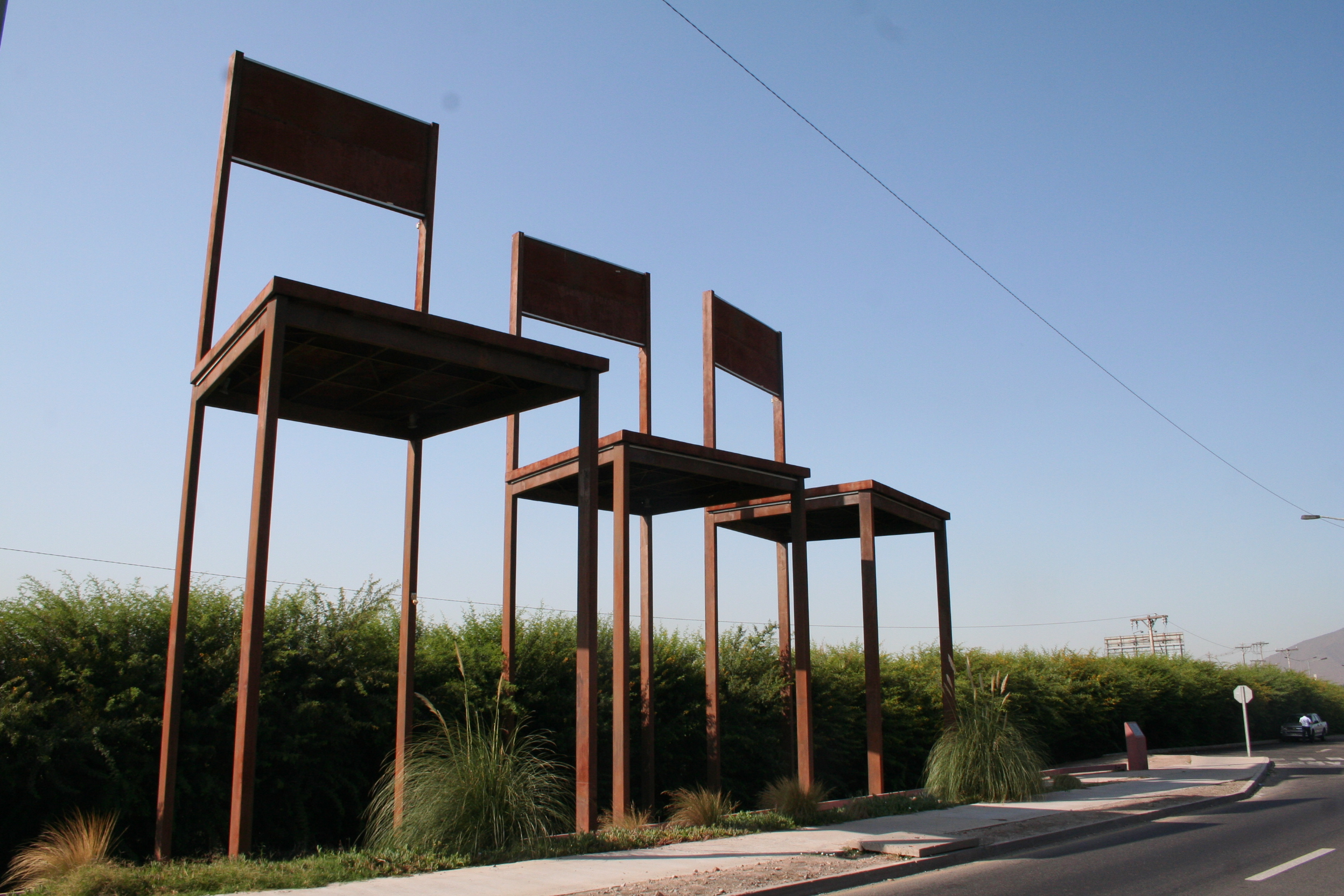
Human Rights Memorial

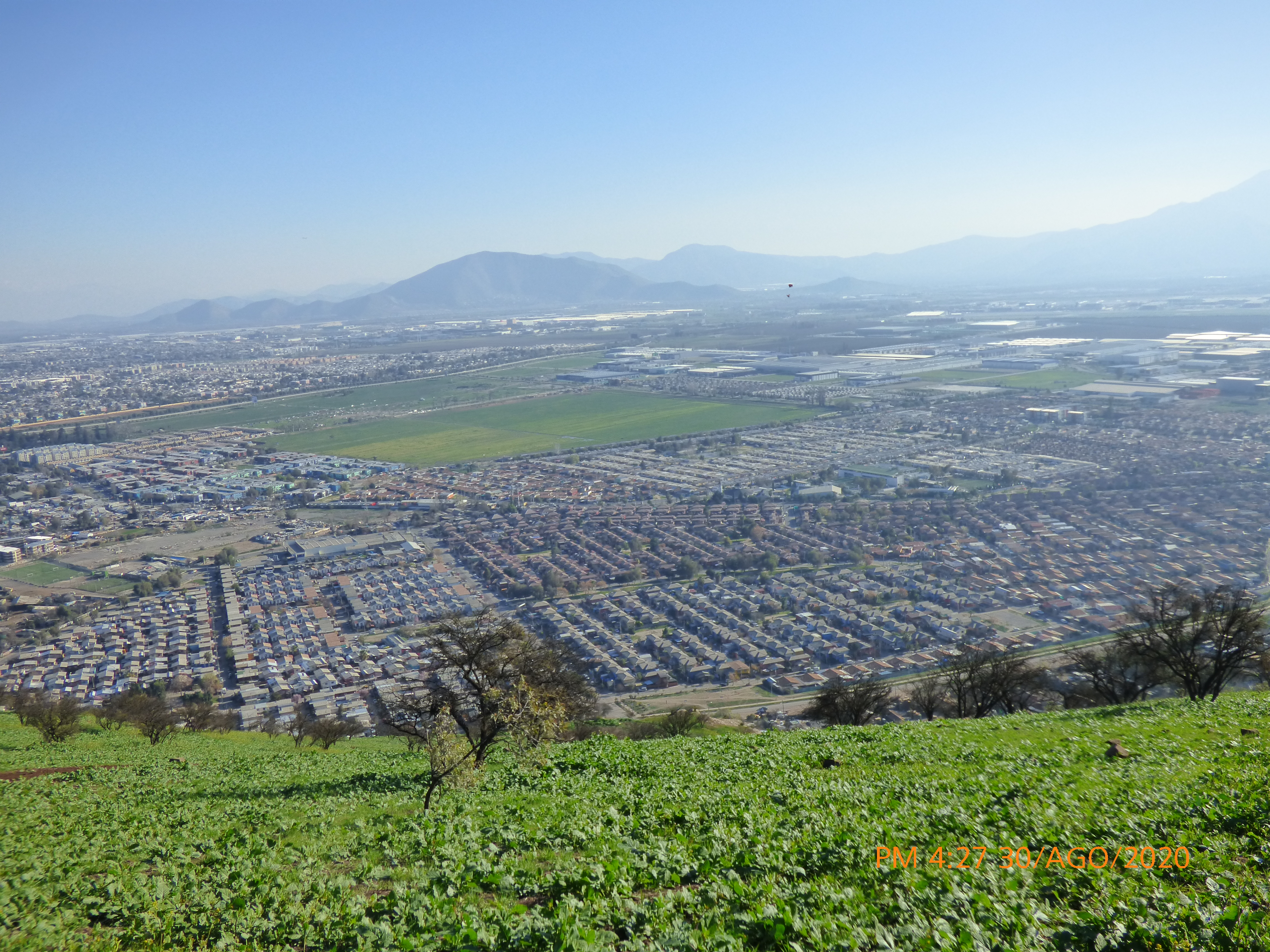
Barrio Nuevo, and La Glorieta neighborhood

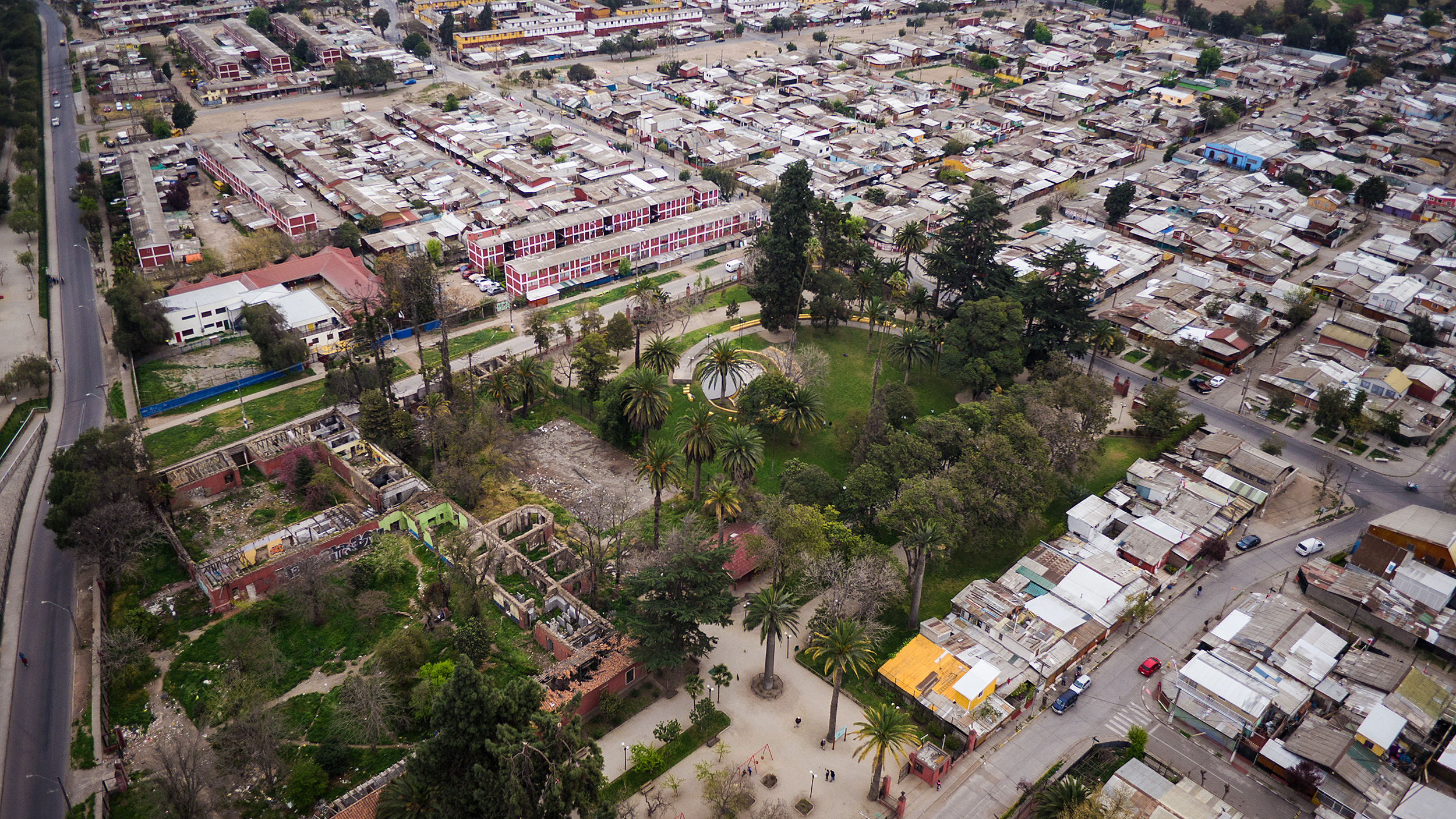
Lo Varas park

== Demographics ==
According to the 2002 census of the National Statistics Institute, Renca spans an area of 24.2 km^{2} (9 sq mi) and has 133,500 inhabitants, and the commune is an entirely urban area. The population grew by 3.5% (4,500 people) between the 1992 and 2002 censuses. The 2006 projected population was 134,690.

=== Statistics ===
- Average annual household income: US$17,278 (PPP, 2006)
- Population below poverty line: 19.2% (2006)
- Regional quality of life index: 63.39, low, 49 out of 52 (2005)
- Human Development Index: 0.709, 112 out of 341 (2003)

== Administration ==
As a commune, Renca is a third-level administrative division of Chile administered by a municipal council, headed by an alcalde who is directly elected every four years. The 2024-2028 mayor is Claudio Castro (Ind). The communal council has the following members:

- Ishkra Wladimir Calderón Soto (PCCh)
- César Demetrio Amestica Alarcón (FA)
- Camila Inés Avilés Barraza (DEM)
- Diego Ignacio Fuentes Lira (Ind/PR)
- Claudio Christian Sepúlveda Ormazabal (FA)
- Ana Paz Casimino Salinas (PCCh)
- Ismael Antonio Araya Araya (Ind/PR)
- Cecilia del Pilar López Contreras (PS)

Within the electoral divisions of Chile, Renca is represented in the Chamber of Deputies by Karla Rubilar (RN) and María Antonieta Saa (PPD) as part of the 17th electoral district, (together with Conchalí and Huechuraba). The commune is represented in the Senate by Guido Girardi Lavín (PPD) and Jovino Novoa Vásquez (UDI) as part of the 7th senatorial constituency (Santiago-West).
