= Salesian Sisters of Don Bosco =

Organization

Daughters of Mary Help of Christians
- Congregatio Filiarum Mariæ Auxiliatricis
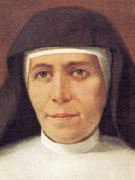
- Maria Mazzarello: Founder
- Abbreviation: FMA
- Founder: St.John Bosco (Don Bosco) St.Maria Domenica Mazzarello, FMA
- Type: Centralized Religious Institute of Consecrated Life of Pontifical Right for Women
- Headquarters: Generalate: Via dell'Ateneo Salesiano, 81, 00139 Rome, Italy
- Members: 11,535 members as of 2020
- Superior General: Sr. Chiara Cazzuola, FMA
- Vicar General: Sr. María del Rosario García Ribas, FMA
- Councilors: List: Sr. Nilza Fátima de Moraes, FMA (Councilor for Formation); Sr. Runita Galve Borja, FMA (Councilor for Youth Pastoral); Sr. Leslie Sandigo Ortega, FMA (Councilor for the Salesian Family); Sr. Ruth del Pilar Mora, FMA (Councilor for the Missions); Sr. Maria Ausilia De Siena,FMA (Councilor for Social Communications); Sr. Ena Veralís Bolaños, FMA (Councilor for Administration)
- Main organ: Salesian of Don Bosco
- Website: cgfmanet.org

The Salesian Sisters of Don Bosco, formally known as the Daughters of Mary Help of Christians (Italian: Figlie di Maria Ausiliatrice; abbreviated FMA) are a female religious institute formed by Saint John Bosco along with Saint Maria Domenica Mazzarello in 1872. They were founded to work alongside Saint John Bosco and his Salesians of Don Bosco in his teaching projects in Turin. Both the orders have same spirituality and educative system, known as the Preventive System of Don Bosco, based on Reason, Religion and Loving Kindness. They continue to be a teaching order worldwide.

== History ==
On August 5, 1872, in Mornese, Alessandria, Italy, the first Daughters of Mary Help of Christians gathered with Don Bosco and Msgr. Joseph Sciandra, the Bishop of Acqui, to celebrate their admission to the novitiate and their first professions. On that day St. Mary Domenica Mazzarello was also elected the first superior.

A year later their first boarding school and primary school was recognized by the educational authorities of Castelletto d’Orba. On October 8, 1874, the Salesian Sisters were able to open their first house in Borgo San Martino. They carried on the tradition of the Salesian Oratory (a place where young people could gather to enjoy themselves, learn, and grow in their faith, safe from harm), ran workshops to educate young women to help them to be self-sufficient. The work of the Salesians Sisters was not limited to a schoolroom as they participated in social works and teaching trades to young women and girls.

Sr. Mary Mazzarello and her first companions were able to profess their perpetual vows, after studying with the Sisters of St. Anne for their religious formation, on August 28, 1875, in the presence of Don Bosco.

Their first house outside of Italy was opened in 1877 in Nice, France. November 9 of the same year Mother Mazzarello and the first missionaries were received in an audience by Pope Pius IX, a great friend and supporter of Don Bosco. Five days later the first missionary sisters departed for Uruguay.

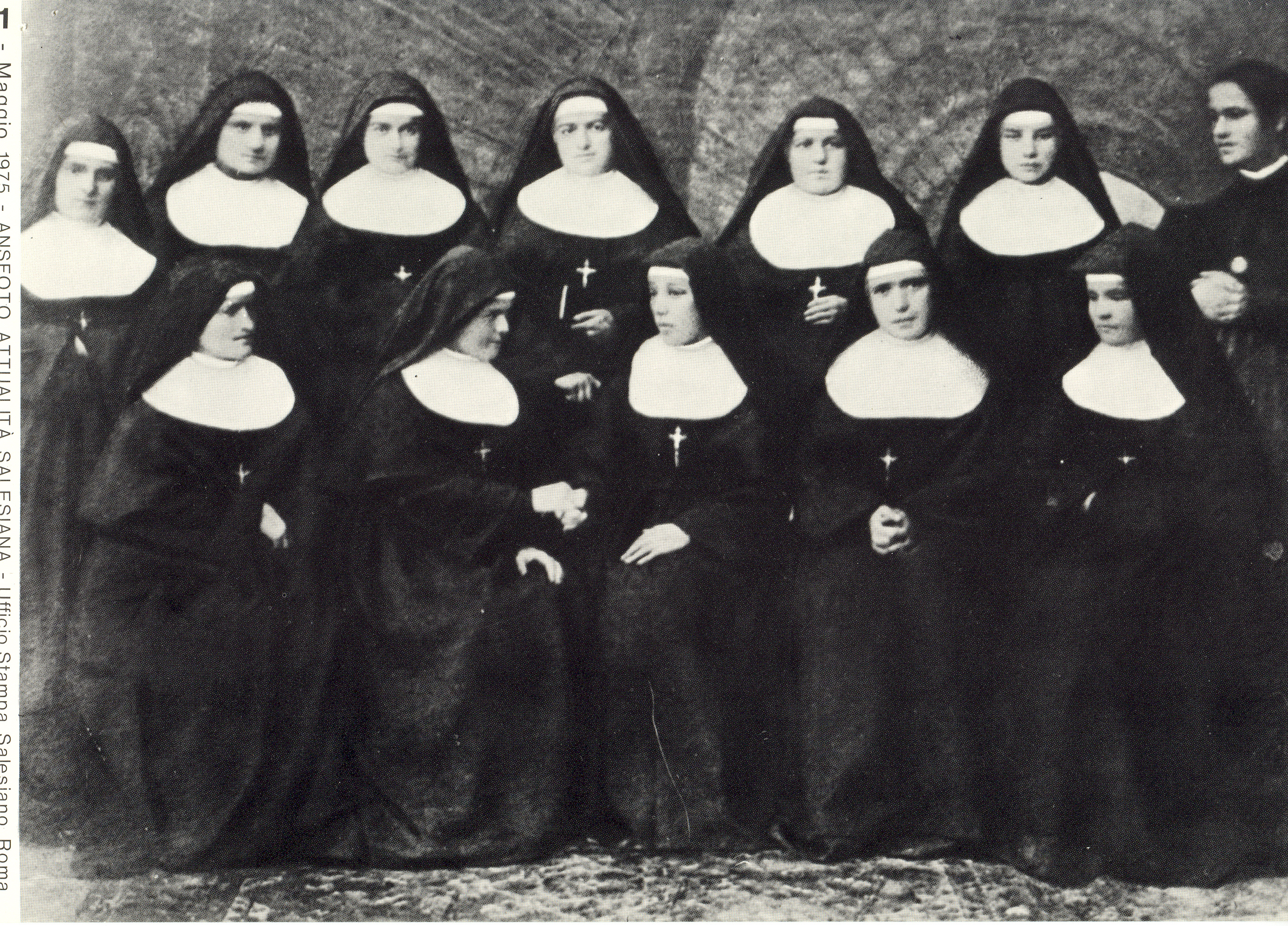
Salesian Sisters, 1879

After many years of revision, discussion and consultation, Don Bosco was able to give to the Daughters of Mary Help of Christians the first printed version of their Constitutions on the feast of the Immaculate Conception, December 8, 1878. In February 1879 the motherhouse of the congregation moved from Mornese to Nizza Monferrato.

The year 1880 saw the second missionary expedition of the Salesian Sisters to Patagonia (Argentina), as they followed their Salesian brothers who had prepared the way for their arrival. In 1881, Mother Mazzarello took ill and died at Nizza Monferrato on May 14, at age 44. At the time of her death there were 26 houses and 166 Sisters.

In 1888, the FMA established their first house in Chile.

When the Sisters arrived in Battersea, London in 1902 only one of the first group of could speak English. They set to in their role supporting the educational work of the Salesians, supervising the domestic arrangements for the community and the pupils. They also found time to undertake some informal education by running an out-of-school club for the disadvantaged children of the area. This was the first of many such clubs that continue to be run by the Sisters up and down the country. World War II brought to an end the work in Dovercourt and Soho where both houses were so badly damaged as to render them uninhabitable.

In 1908, the first Salesian Sisters arrived in the U.S. and settled in New Jersey. From there, Salesian youth and outreach programs spread to Canada and throughout New England, as well as other parts of the country, including Florida, Louisiana, Texas, and California.

In 1920 the first four Sisters came to Ireland, three Italians and one English of Irish parents, and started their work in Limerick. The sisters run a primary school, Scoil Mhuire Banríon na hÉireann (the "School of Mary, Queen of Ireland") in Caherdavin, a suburb of Limerick city.

In 2017 the work of Sister Carolin Tahhan Fachakh in Syria was recognised by the United States Secretary of State who awarded her an International Women of Courage Award. Sister Carol runs a nursery in war-torn Aleppo that cares for mothers and children irrespective of faith. The sisters teach mothers to sew. Sister Carol who had been nominated under President Obama spoke out against President Trump and in support of the Syrian president Bashar al-Assad.

== Apostolate ==
The ministry of the Daughters of Mary Help of Christians is youth-centered. The Sisters in Liverpool, England, opened Mary, Help of Christians High School in 1965. Many Sisters are involved in youth clubs and projects, the present day version of the ‘oratory’ so much a part of Salesian work and belief. Among these is the Follow Your Dream Project (FYD), started in 1998 in the Bawnogue area of Clondalkin, Dublin. FYD seeks to promote the growth and development of young people in disadvantaged areas, to increase their confidence and self-esteem and assist them in acquiring new skills and developing their talents. FYD hosts a variety of activities including a bowling night and a trip to a Christmas panto.

As of 2020, they number 11,535 members in 89 countries, and on five continents.

Mother Antonia Colombo served as Superior General. The current Superior General is Sr. Chiara Cazzuola.

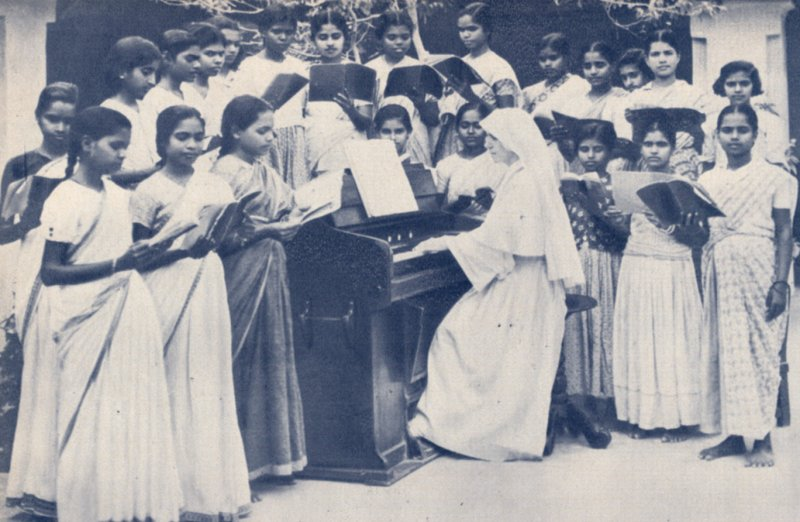
Salesian sister teaching music in Vellore, India

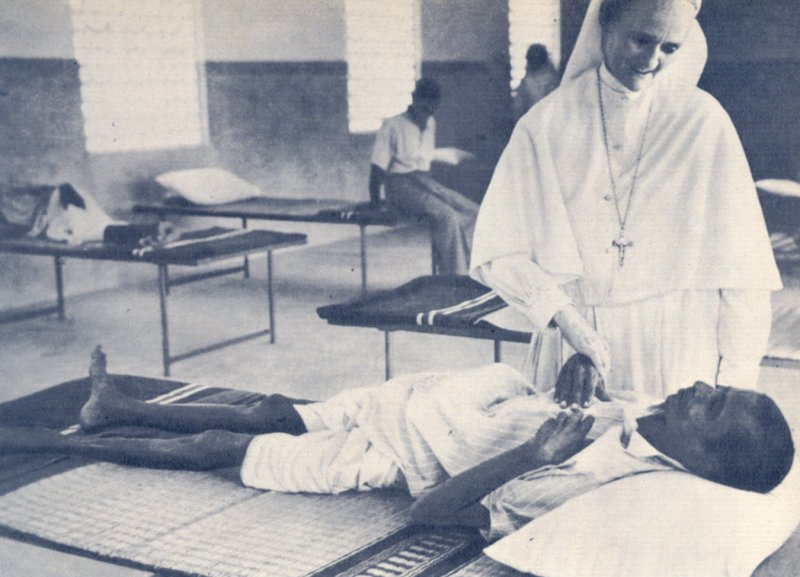
Salesian sister caring for the sick and poor in former Madras Presidency, India

== Saints, Blesseds, and other holy people ==
=== Saints ===
- Maria Domenica Mazzarello (9 May 1837 – 14 May 1881), founder of the order, canonized on 24 June 1951
- John Bosco (16 August 1815 – 31 January 1888), founder of the order, canonized on 1 April 1934
- Maria Troncatti (16 February 1883 - 25 August 1969), professed religious, canonized on 19 October 2025

=== Blesseds ===
- Laura del Carmen Vicuña Pino (5 April 1891 – 22 January 1904), Chilean child who studied under the Sisters, beatified on 3 September 1988
- Maddalena Caterina Morano (15 November 1847 - 26 March 1908), professed religious, beatified on 5 November 1994
- Eusebia Palomino Yenes (15 December 1899 - 10 February 1935), professed religious, beatified on 25 April 2004
- Carmen Moreno Benítez (24 August 1885 – 6 September 1936), martyred during the Spanish Civil War, beatified on 11 March 2001
- Amparo Carbonell Muñoz (9 November 1893 – 6 September 1936), martyred during the Spanish Civil War, beatified on 11 March 2001
- María Romero Meneses (13 January 1902 – 7 July 1977), professed religious and "Social Apostle of Costa Rica", beatified on April 14, 2002

=== Venerables ===
- Teresa Valsè Pantellini (10 October 1878 - 3 September 1907), professed religious, declared Venerable on 12 July 1982
- Laura Meozzi (5 January 1873 - 31 August 1951), professed religious, declared Venerable on 27 June 2011

=== Servants of God ===
- Rosetta Marchese (20 October 1922 - 8 March 1984), professed religious, declared Servant of God on 13 January 2021
- Antonieta Böhm Schwanewilm (23 September 1907 - 27 April 2008), professed religious and centenarian, declared Servant of God on 19 October 2016

== Controversies ==
On the 20th of December 2019, Maria Angela Fare, a former Italian nun of the Sisters of Don Bosco, has been sentenced to 3 1/2 years facing jail for sexual abuse on a girl she met in the oratory: the girl later committed suicide in 2011.
