= Israel =

Country in West Asia

State of Israel מְדִינַת יִשְׂרָאֵל (Hebrew) Medīnat Yisrā'el دَوْلَة إِسْرَائِيل (Arabic) Dawlat Isrā'īl
- Flag Emblem
- Anthem: הַתִּקְוָה (Hatīkvāh; "The Hope")
- Israeli territory The Golan Heights, under Israeli control The West Bank, which is largely controlled by Israel, and the Gaza Strip, which Israel has been occupying since 2023
- Capital and largest city: Jerusalem (limited recognition) (Note: Jerusalem has limited international recognition as Israel's capital city. Argentina, the Democratic Republic of the Congo (DRC) Fiji, Guatemala, Honduras, Kosovo, Nauru, Papua New Guinea (PNG), Paraguay and the United States recognise all of Jerusalem as the capital of Israel, while the Czech Republic and Russia only recognise West Jerusalem as the capital of Israel. Australia previously recognised West Jerusalem as the capital of Israel in 2018, but withdrew its recognition in 2022.) (Note: Jerusalem is Israel's largest city if including East Jerusalem, which is widely recognised as occupied territory. If East Jerusalem is not counted, the largest city would be Tel Aviv.); 31°47′N 35°13′E
- Official language: Hebrew
- Special status: Arabic (Note: Arabic has a "special status" as set by the Basic Law of 2018, which allows it to be used by official institutions. Prior to that law's passage, Arabic had been an official language alongside Hebrew.)
- Ethnic groups (2025 est.): 71.9% Jews; 21% Arabs; 7.1% others
- Religion (2023 est.): 73.7% Judaism; 18.3% Islam; 1.9% Christianity; 1.6% Druze faith; 4.5% others
- Demonym: Israeli
- Government: Unitary parliamentary republic
  - President: Isaac Herzog
  - Prime Minister: Benjamin Netanyahu
- Legislature: Knesset

Establishment
  - Declaration of independence: 14 May 1948

Area
  - Total: 22,072 or 20,770 km^{2} (8,522 or 8,019 sq mi) (Note: 20,770 km^{2} is Israel within the Green Line. 22,072 km^{2} includes the occupied Golan Heights (c. 1,200 km^{2} (460 sq mi)) and East Jerusalem (c. 64 km^{2} (25 sq mi)).) (148th)
  - Water (%): 2.71

Population
  - 2026 estimate: 10,147,200 (93rd)
  - 2022 census: 9,601,720 (Note: Israeli population and economic data covers the economic territory of Israel, including the Golan Heights, East Jerusalem and Israeli settlements in the West Bank.)
  - Density: 466/km^{2} (1,206.9/sq mi) (30th)
- GDP (PPP): 2026 estimate
  - Total: ▲$619.724 billion (49th)
  - Per capita: ▲$60,100 (35th)
- GDP (nominal): 2026 estimate
  - Total: ▲$746.982 billion (24th)
  - Per capita: ▲$72,441 (12th)
- Gini (2021): ▲37.9 medium inequality
- HDI (2023): ▲0.919 very high (27th)
- Currency: New shekel (₪) (ILS)
- Time zone: UTC+2:00 (IST)
  - Summer (DST): UTC+3:00 (IDT)
- Calling code: +972
- ISO 3166 code: IL
- Internet TLD: .il

Israel, (Note: /ˈɪzriəl, -reɪ-/; Hebrew: יִשְׂרָאֵל, romanised: Yīsrāʾēl [jisʁaˈʔel]; Arabic: إِسْرَائِيل, romanised: ʾIsrāʾīl) officially the State of Israel, (Note: Hebrew: מְדִינַת יִשְׂרָאֵל, romanised: Medīnat Yīsrāʾēl [mediˈnat jisʁaˈʔel]; Arabic: دَوْلَة إِسْرَائِيل, romanised: Dawlat Isrāʾīl) is a country in the Southern Levant region of West Asia. It is bordered by Lebanon to the north, Syria to the northeast, Jordan to the east, and Egypt to the southwest. Israel's western coast lies on the Mediterranean Sea, its southern tip reaches the Red Sea, and to the east is Earth's lowest point near the Dead Sea. Jerusalem is the government seat and proclaimed capital, while Tel Aviv is Israel's largest urban area and economic centre.

Israel is located in a region known in Jewish tradition as the Land of Israel, synonymous with Canaan, Palestine, and the Holy Land. In antiquity it was home to the Canaanite civilisation, followed by the kingdoms of Israel and Judah. Situated at a continental crossroad, the region experienced demographic changes under the rule of empires from the Romans to the Ottomans. European antisemitism in the late 19th century galvanised Zionism, which sought to establish a homeland for the Jewish people in Palestine and gained British support with the Balfour Declaration. After World War I, Britain occupied the region and established Mandatory Palestine in 1920. Increased Jewish immigration in the lead-up to the Holocaust and British foreign policy in the Middle East led to intercommunal conflict between Jews and the Arab-majority population, which escalated into a civil war in 1947 after the United Nations (UN) proposed partitioning the land between them.

After the end of the British Mandate for Palestine, Israel declared independence on 14 May 1948. Neighbouring Arab states invaded the area the next day, beginning the First Arab–Israeli War. The 1949 armistice left Israel controlling more territory than had been allocated to it under the UN partition plan. No independent Palestinian Arab state was established, leaving Gaza under Egyptian control and the West Bank ruled by Jordan. Most Palestinian Arabs fled or were expelled during the Nakba, while Israel's population increased greatly over the following decades as the country received an influx of Jews who emigrated, fled or were expelled from the Arab world. After the 1967 Six-Day War, Israel occupied the West Bank, Gaza and Egyptian Sinai, and annexed East Jerusalem and the Syrian Golan Heights. Peace treaties were signed with Egypt in 1979 (the Sinai being returned in 1982) and Jordan in 1994. The 1993 Oslo Accords introduced limited Palestinian self-rule in the West Bank and Gaza, while the 2020 Abraham Accords normalised ties with more Arab states, but the Israeli–Palestinian conflict persists. Israel's illegal occupation of the Palestinian territories has drawn international criticism, with most Middle East experts arguing that Israel's treatment of Palestinians in the West Bank in relation to Israeli settlers constitutes a system of apartheid. After the Hamas-led October 7 attacks, Israel began committing genocide against Palestinians in Gaza. Israel and its allies deny that Israel's actions constitute genocide.

The Basic Laws of Israel establish the Knesset as a proportionally elected parliament. It shapes the government, led by the prime minister, and elects the largely ceremonial president. Israel has one of the Middle East's largest economies, one of Asia's highest living standards, and globally ranks 24th in nominal GDP and 12th in nominal GDP per capita. One of the world's most technologically advanced countries, Israel allocates a larger share of its economy to research and development than any other state and is believed to possess nuclear weapons. The only country with a revived official language, Hebrew, the culture of Israel combines Jewish traditions with Arab influences.

== Etymology ==
The names Land of Israel and Children of Israel have historically been used to refer to the biblical Kingdom of Israel and the entire Jewish people respectively. The name Israel (Hebrew: Yīsrāʾēl; Septuagint Ancient Greek: Ἰσραήλ, Israēl, "El (God) persists/rules") refers to the patriarch Jacob who, according to the Hebrew Bible, was given the name after he successfully wrestled with the Angel of the Lord. The earliest known archaeological artefact to mention the word Israel as a collective is the Merneptah Stele of ancient Egypt (dated to the late-13th century BCE). (Note: The personal name "Israel" appears much earlier, in material from Ebla.)

Under the British Mandate (1920–1948), the entire region was known as Palestine. Upon establishment in 1948, the country formally adopted the name State of Israel (Hebrew: מְדִינַת יִשְׂרָאֵל, Medīnat Yisrā'el [mediˈnat jisʁaˈʔel]; Arabic: دَوْلَة إِسْرَائِيل, Dawlat Isrāʼīl, [dawlat ʔisraːˈʔiːl]) after other proposed names including Land of Israel (Eretz Israel), Ever (from ancestor Eber), Zion, and Judea, were considered but rejected. The name Israel was suggested by David Ben-Gurion and passed by a vote of 6–3. In the early weeks after establishment, the government chose the term Israeli to denote a citizen of the state.

== History ==
=== Prehistory ===
The Ubeidiya prehistoric site in northern Israel shows the presence of archaic humans around 1.5 million years ago. The second-oldest evidence of anatomically modern humans outside Africa is a 200,000-year-old fossil from Misliya Cave on Mount Carmel. The Natufian culture (c. 10,000 BCE) may be linked to the Proto-Afroasiatic language and is notable for adopting sedentism before the advent of agriculture and the Neolithic Revolution.

=== Bronze and Iron Ages ===
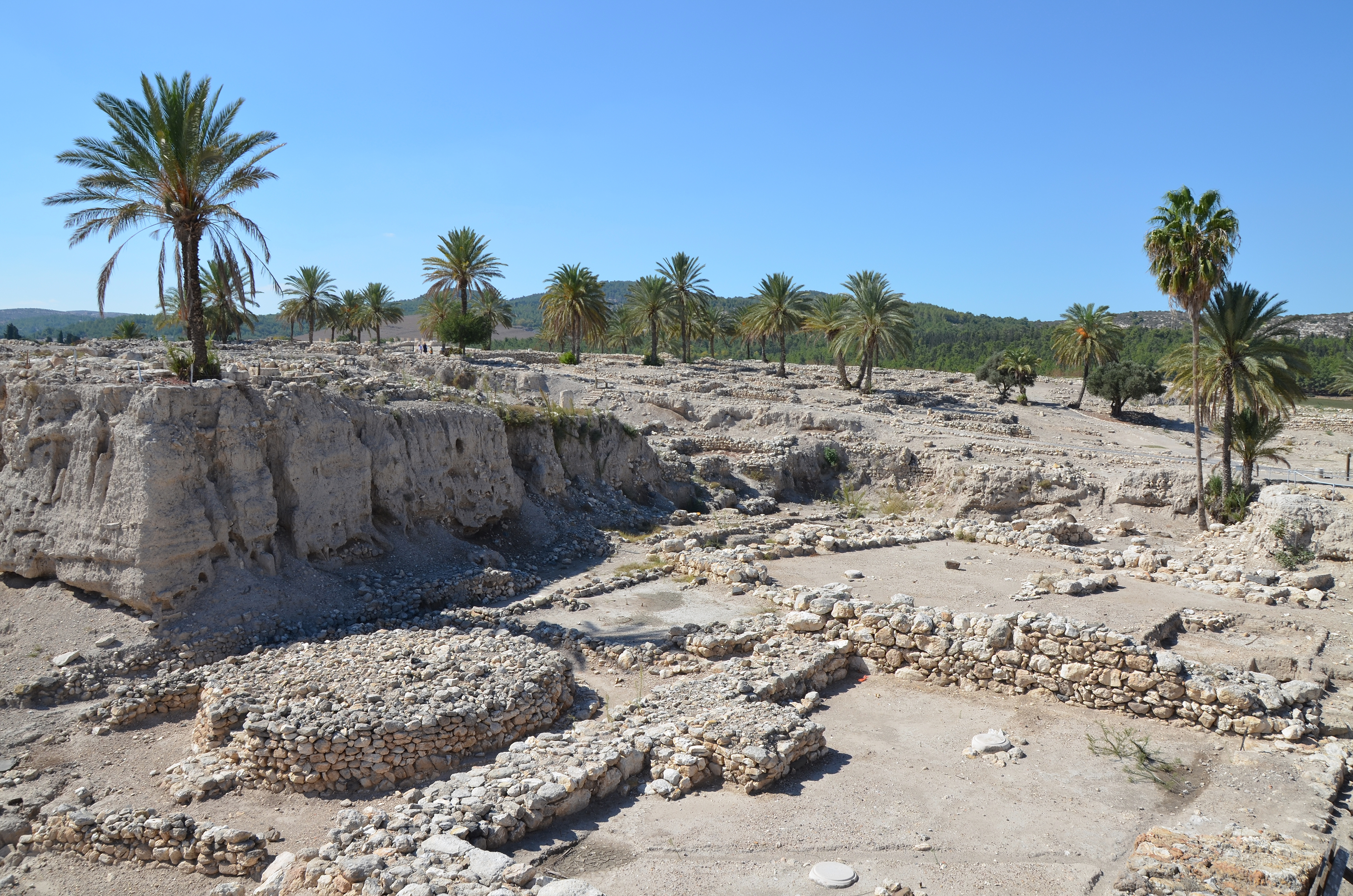
Tel Megiddo, the ruins of a Canaanite and later Israelite city

Early references to "Canaan" and "Canaanites" appear in ancient Near Eastern and Egyptian texts (c. 2000 BCE); these populations were structured as politically independent city-states. During the Late Bronze Age (1550–1200 BCE), large parts of Canaan formed vassal states of the New Kingdom of Egypt. As a result of the Late Bronze Age collapse, Canaan fell into chaos, and Egyptian control over the region collapsed. Ancestors of the Israelites are thought to have included ancient Semitic-speaking peoples native to this area. Modern archaeological accounts suggest that the Israelites and their culture branched out of the Canaanite peoples through the settlement of the central highlands and the development of a distinct monolatristic—and later monotheistic—religion centered on Yahweh. They spoke an archaic form of Hebrew, known as Biblical Hebrew. Around the same time, the Philistines settled on the southern coastal plain.

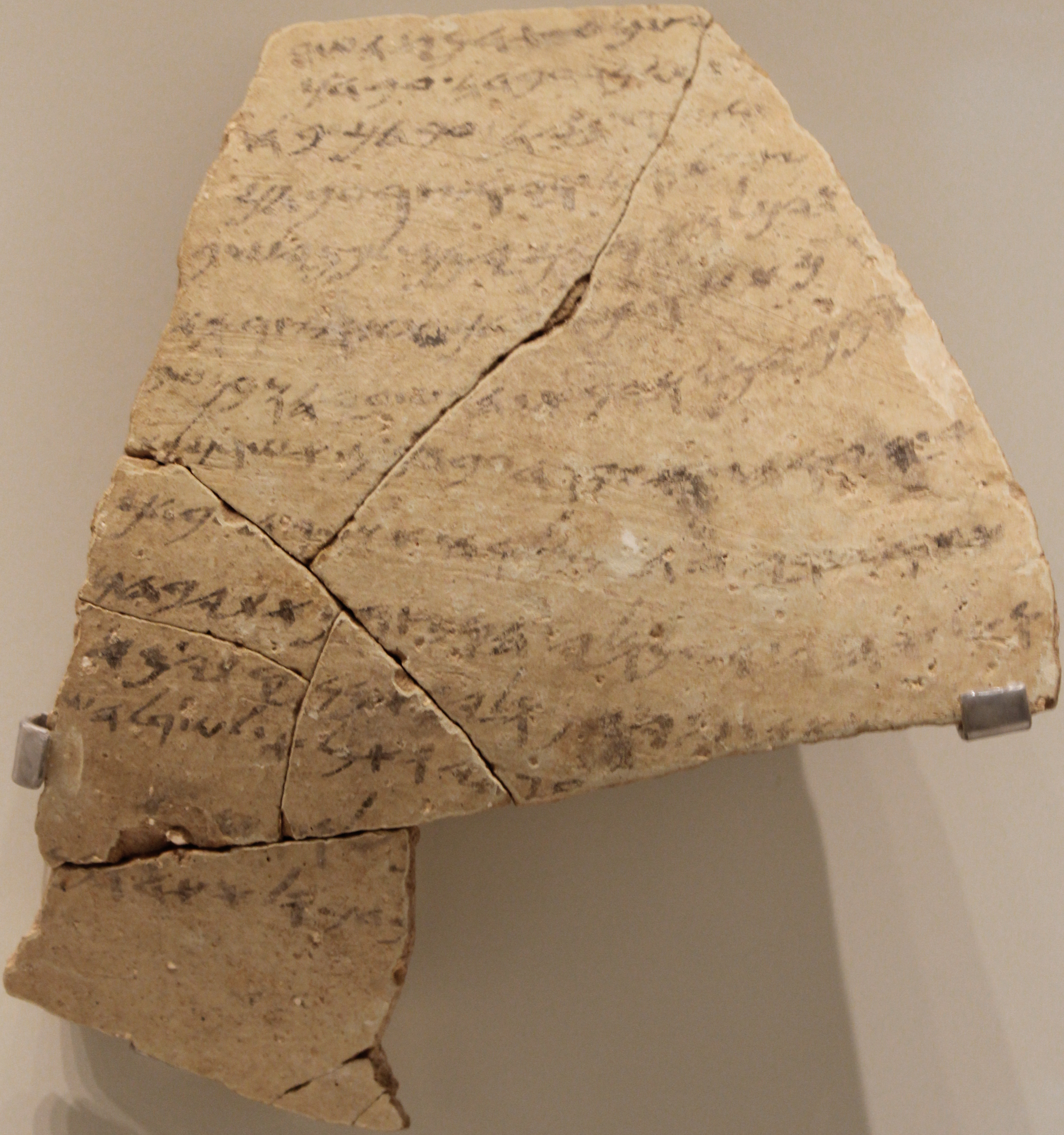
The Yavne-Yam ostracon, a Paleo-Hebrew inscription documenting administration in Judah

Most modern scholars agree that the Exodus narrative in the Torah and Old Testament did not take place as depicted; however, some elements of these traditions do have historical roots. There is debate about the earliest existence of the Kingdoms of Israel and Judah and their extent and power. While it is unclear if there was a United Kingdom of Israel, historians and archaeologists agree that the northern Kingdom of Israel existed by ca. 900 BCE and the Kingdom of Judah by ca. 850 BCE. The Kingdom of Israel was the more prosperous of the two and soon developed into a regional power, with a capital at Samaria; during the Omride dynasty, it controlled Samaria, Galilee, the upper Jordan Valley, the plain of Sharon and large parts of Transjordan. The Kingdom of Israel was conquered around 720 BCE by the Neo-Assyrian Empire. The Kingdom of Judah, under Davidic rule with its capital in Jerusalem, later became a client state of first the Neo-Assyrian Empire and then the Neo-Babylonian Empire. It is estimated that the region's population was around 400,000 in the Iron Age II. In 587/6 BCE, following a revolt in Judah, King Nebuchadnezzar II besieged and destroyed Jerusalem and Solomon's Temple, dissolved the kingdom and exiled much of the Judean elite to Babylon.

=== Classical antiquity ===
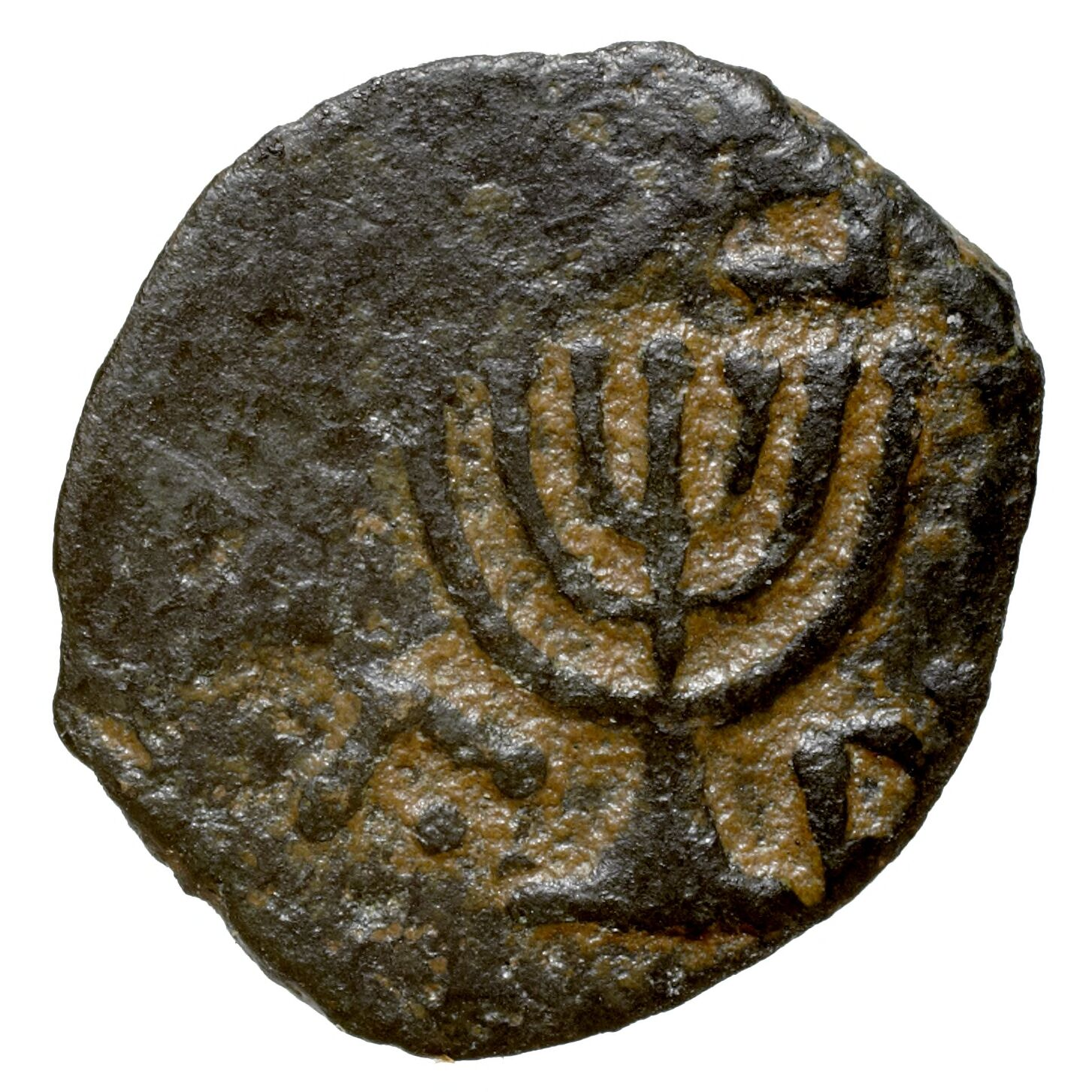
Hasmonean coin of Antigonus II Mattathias, depicting the Temple menorah

After capturing Babylon in 539 BCE, Cyrus the Great, founder of the Achaemenid Empire, issued a proclamation allowing the exiled Judean population to return. The construction of the Second Temple was completed c. 520 BCE. The Achaemenids ruled the region as the province of Yehud Medinata. In 332 BCE, Alexander the Great conquered the region as part of his campaign against the Achaemenid Empire. After his death, the area was controlled by the Ptolemaic and Seleucid empires as a part of Coele-Syria. Under the Hellenistic kingdoms, ongoing Hellenisation generated cultural tensions among the Jewish population that culminated under Antiochus IV, whose decrees outlawed Jewish practices and triggered the Maccabean Revolt in 167 BCE. The revolt weakened Seleucid control over Judea; by 142/141 BCE the Hasmoneans had secured autonomy and soon established an independent Jewish kingdom that, in the late 2nd–early 1st century BCE, expanded into neighbouring territories. The Hasmonean civil war ended with the Roman siege of Jerusalem in 63 BCE.

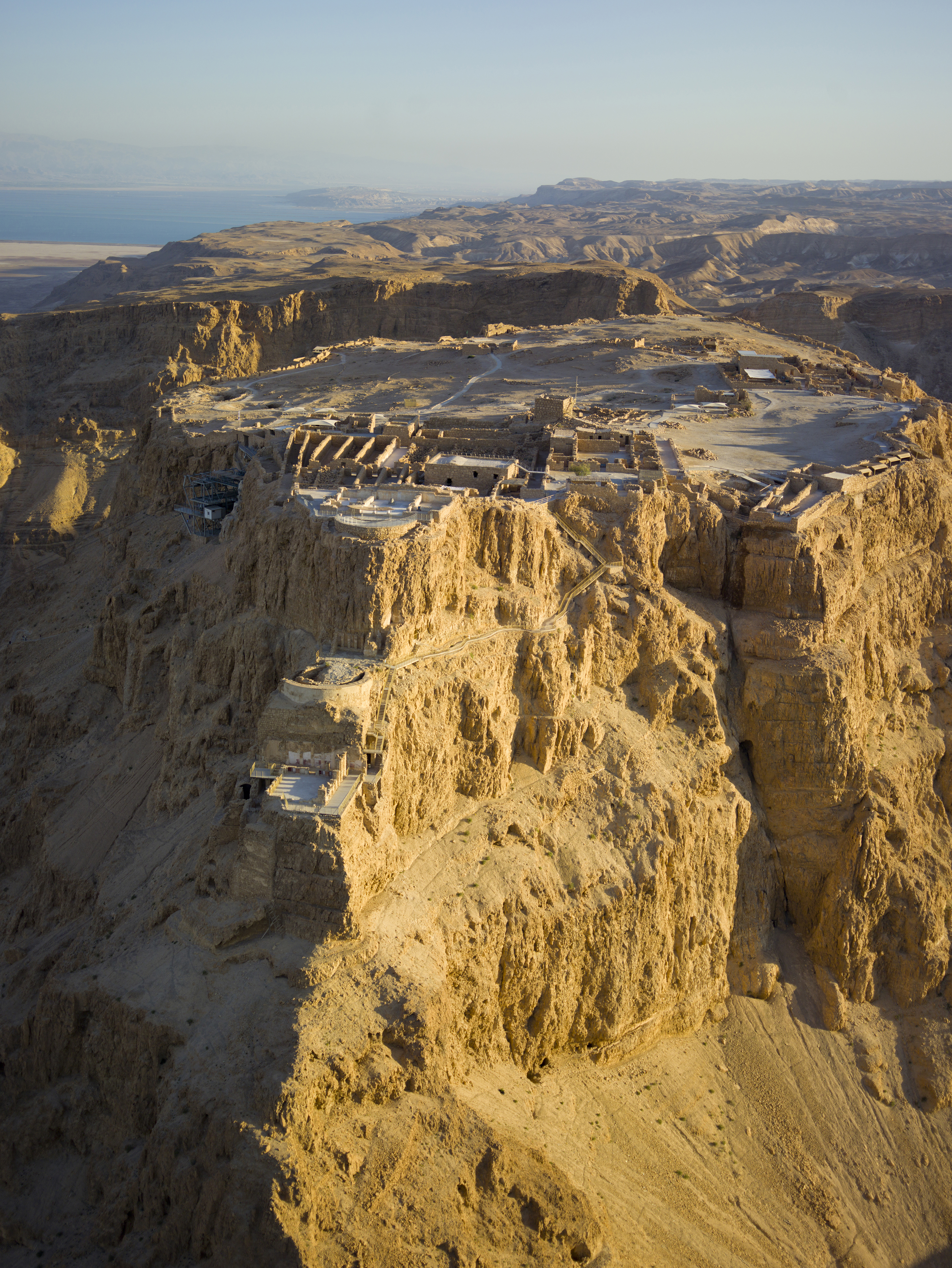
View of the Masada fortress overlooking the Dead Sea, which is the location of a 1st-century Roman siege

In 37 BCE, Herod the Great was installed as a dynastic vassal of Rome following the Roman–Parthian Wars. In 6 CE, the area was annexed as the Roman province of Judaea; tensions with Roman rule led to a series of Jewish–Roman wars, resulting in widespread destruction. The First Jewish–Roman War (66–73 CE) resulted in the destruction of Jerusalem and the Second Temple and a sizable portion of the population being killed or displaced. A second uprising known as the Bar Kokhba revolt (132–136 CE) initially allowed the Jews to form an independent state, but the Romans brutally crushed the rebellion, devastating and depopulating Judea's countryside. Jerusalem was rebuilt as a Roman colony (Aelia Capitolina), and the province of Judea was renamed Syria Palaestina. Jews were expelled from the districts surrounding Jerusalem. Nevertheless, there was a continuous small Jewish presence, and Galilee became its religious center.

=== Late antiquity and the medieval period ===
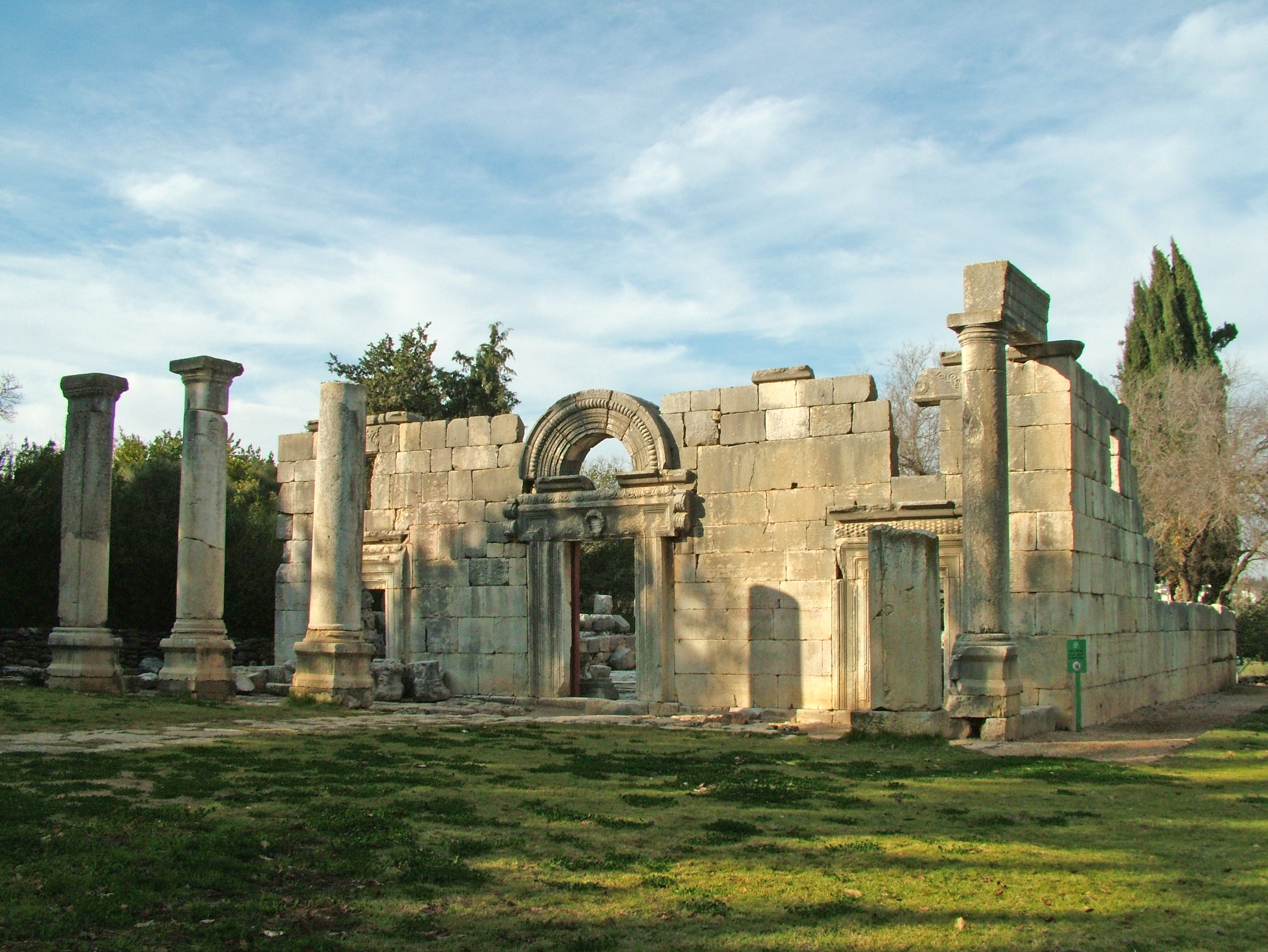
3rd-century Kfar Bar'am synagogue in the Galilee

During the Byzantine period, Early Christianity displaced Roman paganism in the 4th century CE, with Constantine embracing and promoting the Christian religion and Theodosius I making it the state religion. A series of laws were passed that discriminated against Jews and Judaism, and Jews were persecuted by both the church and the authorities. Many Jews had emigrated to flourishing diaspora communities, while locally there was both Christian immigration and local conversion. By the middle of the 5th century, there was a Christian majority. Towards the end of the 5th century, Samaritan revolts erupted, continuing until the late 6th century and resulting in a large decrease in the Samaritan population. After the Sasanian conquest of Jerusalem and the short-lived Jewish revolt against Heraclius in 614 CE, the Byzantine Empire reconsolidated control of the area in 628.

In 634–641 CE, the Rashidun Caliphate conquered the Levant. Caliph Umar ibn al-Khattab (r. 634–644) lifted the Christian ban on Jews entering Jerusalem and permitted them to worship there. Over the next six centuries, control of the region transferred between the Umayyad, Abbasid, and Fatimid caliphates, and subsequently the Seljuk and Ayyubid dynasties. The population drastically decreased during the following several centuries, dropping from an estimated 1 million during Roman and Byzantine periods to about 300,000 by the early Ottoman period, and there was steady Arabisation and Islamisation. The end of the 11th century brought the Crusades, papally-sanctioned incursions of Christian crusaders intent on wresting Jerusalem and the Holy Land from Muslim control and establishing crusader states. The Ayyubids pushed back the crusaders before Muslim rule was fully restored by the Mamluk sultans of Egypt in 1291.

=== Modern period and the emergence of Zionism ===
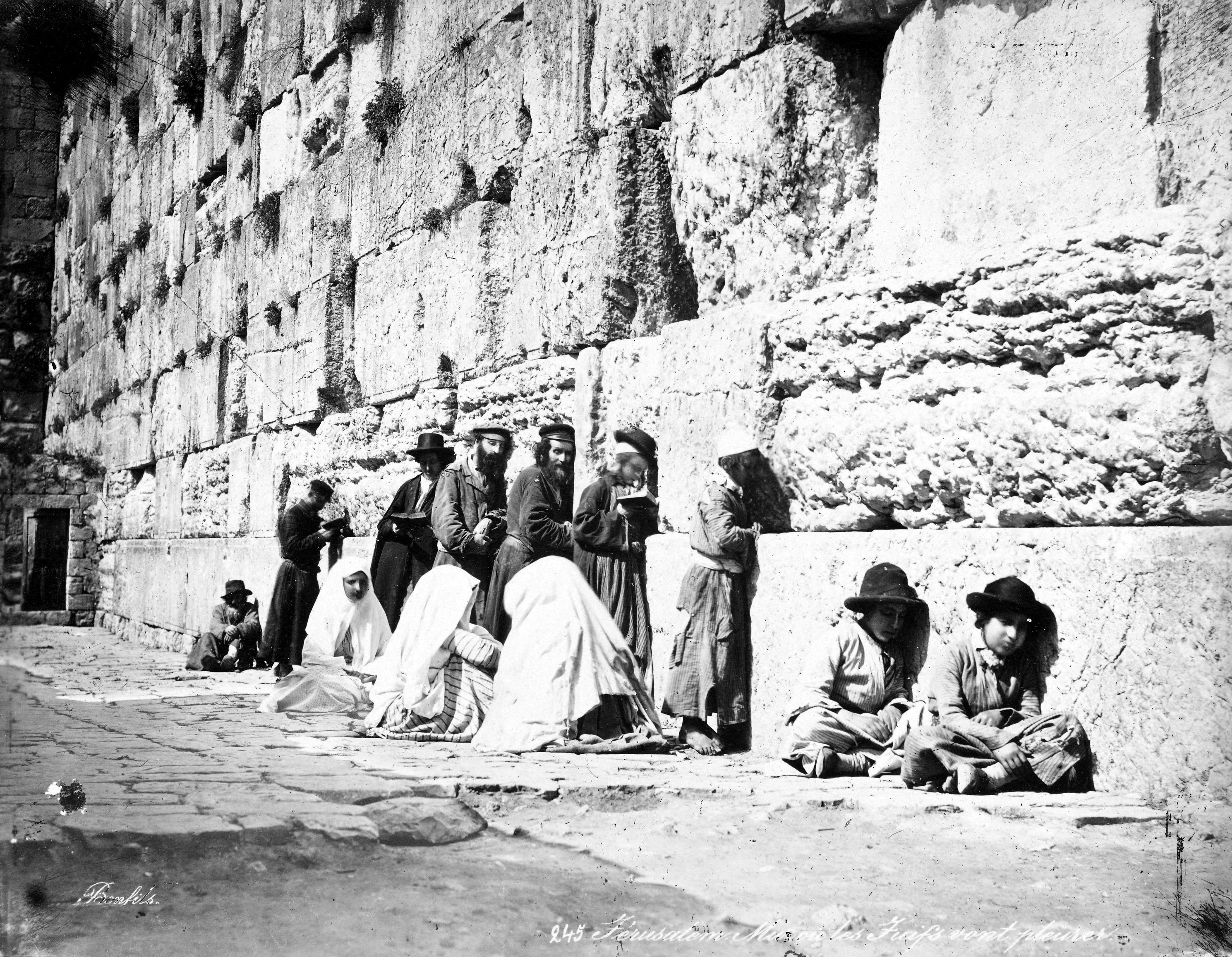
Jews at the Western Wall in the 1870s, a holy site in Judaism

In 1516, the Ottoman Empire conquered the region and ruled it as part of Ottoman Syria. Two violent incidents took place against Jews, the 1517 Safed attacks and Hebron attacks, after the Ottomans ousted the Mamluks during the Ottoman–Mamluk War. Under the Ottoman Empire, the Levant was cosmopolitan, with freedoms for Christians, Muslims, and Jews. In 1561 the Ottoman sultan invited Sephardic Jews escaping the Spanish Inquisition to settle and rebuild the city of Tiberias.

Under the Ottoman Empire's millet system, Christians and Jews were considered dhimmi ("protected") under Ottoman law in exchange for loyalty to the state and payment of the jizya tax. Non-Muslim subjects faced geographic and lifestyle restrictions, though they were not always enforced. The millet system organised non-Muslims into autonomous communities on the basis of religion.

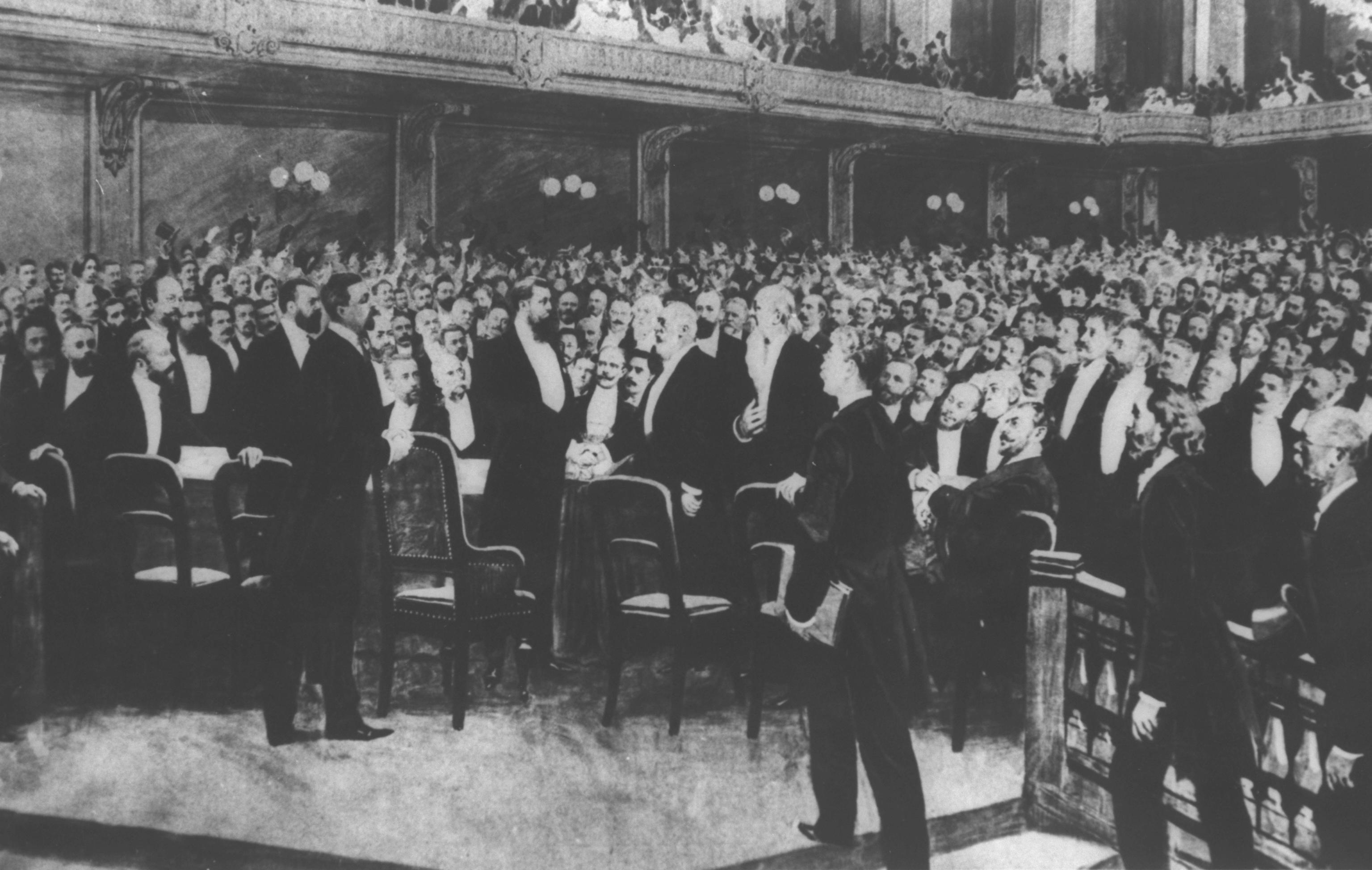
The First Zionist Congress (1897) in Basel, Switzerland

The concept of an eventual Return to Zion remained a symbol within Jewish belief which emphasised their return should be determined by Divine Providence rather than human action. The Jewish population of Palestine from Ottoman rule to the beginning of the Zionist movement, known as the Old Yishuv, comprised a minority. During the 16th century, Jewish communities struck roots in the Four Holy Cities—Jerusalem, Tiberias, Hebron, and Safed—and in 1697, Rabbi Yehuda Hachasid led 1,500 Jews to Jerusalem. A 1660 Druze revolt against the Ottomans destroyed Safed and Tiberias. In the 18th century, Eastern European Jews who were opponents of Hasidism, known as the Perushim, settled in Palestine.

In the late 18th century, Arab Sheikh Daher al-Umar created an independent emirate in the Galilee. After Daher's death the Ottomans regained control of the area. In 1799, governor Jazzar Pasha repelled an assault on Acre by Napoleon's troops, prompting the French to abandon their Syrian campaign. In 1834, a revolt by Palestinian peasants against Egyptian conscription and taxation under Muhammad Ali was suppressed; Ali's army retreated and Ottoman rule was restored with British support in 1840. The Tanzimat reforms were implemented across the Ottoman Empire.

The first wave of modern Jewish migration to Ottoman-ruled Palestine, known as the First Aliyah, began in 1881, as Jews fled pogroms in Eastern Europe. The 1882 May Laws increased economic discrimination against Jews, and restricted where they could live. Antisemitism, pogroms and policies in tsarist Russia led to the emigration of three million Jews between 1882 and 1914, only 1% of whom went to Palestine. Those who went were driven by ideas of self-determination and Jewish identity, rather than pogroms or economic insecurity. Zionism emerged as a political movement to reestablish a Jewish homeland in Palestine. The revival of the Hebrew language, during which Hebrew was adapted for modern use and gradually became the primary language of Jews in Palestine, also began.

The Second Aliyah (1904–14) began after the Kishinev pogrom; 40,000 Jews settled in Palestine, although nearly half left. The first and second waves were mainly Orthodox Jews. The Second Aliyah included Zionist socialist groups who established the kibbutz movement based on the idea of establishing a separate Jewish economy based on Jewish labour. Those of the Second Aliyah who became leaders of the Yishuv believed the Jewish settler economy should not depend on Arab labour. This would be a dominant source of antagonism with the Arab population, with Yishuv's nationalist ideology overpowering its socialist one. Though the immigrants of the Second Aliyah sought to create communal Jewish agricultural settlements, Tel Aviv was established as the first planned Jewish town in 1909. Jewish militias emerged, the first being Bar-Giora in 1907; two years later, the larger Hashomer organisation replaced it.

=== British Mandate for Palestine ===
Chaim Weizmann's efforts to garner British support for the Zionist movement secured the 1917 Balfour Declaration, stating Britain's support for the creation of a Jewish "national home" in Palestine. Balfour was aware of the developing principle of self-determination and its implications for Palestine. In a letter to a leader of the Zionist movement he wrote:

The Powers had committed themselves to the Zionist programme which inevitably excluded numerical self-determination. Palestine presented a unique situation. We are dealing not with the wishes of an existing community but are consciously seeking to reconstitute a new community and definitely building for a numerical majority in the future.

Weizmann's interpretation of the declaration was that negotiations on the future of the country were to happen between Britain and the Jews, excluding Arabs. Jewish-Arab relations in Palestine deteriorated.

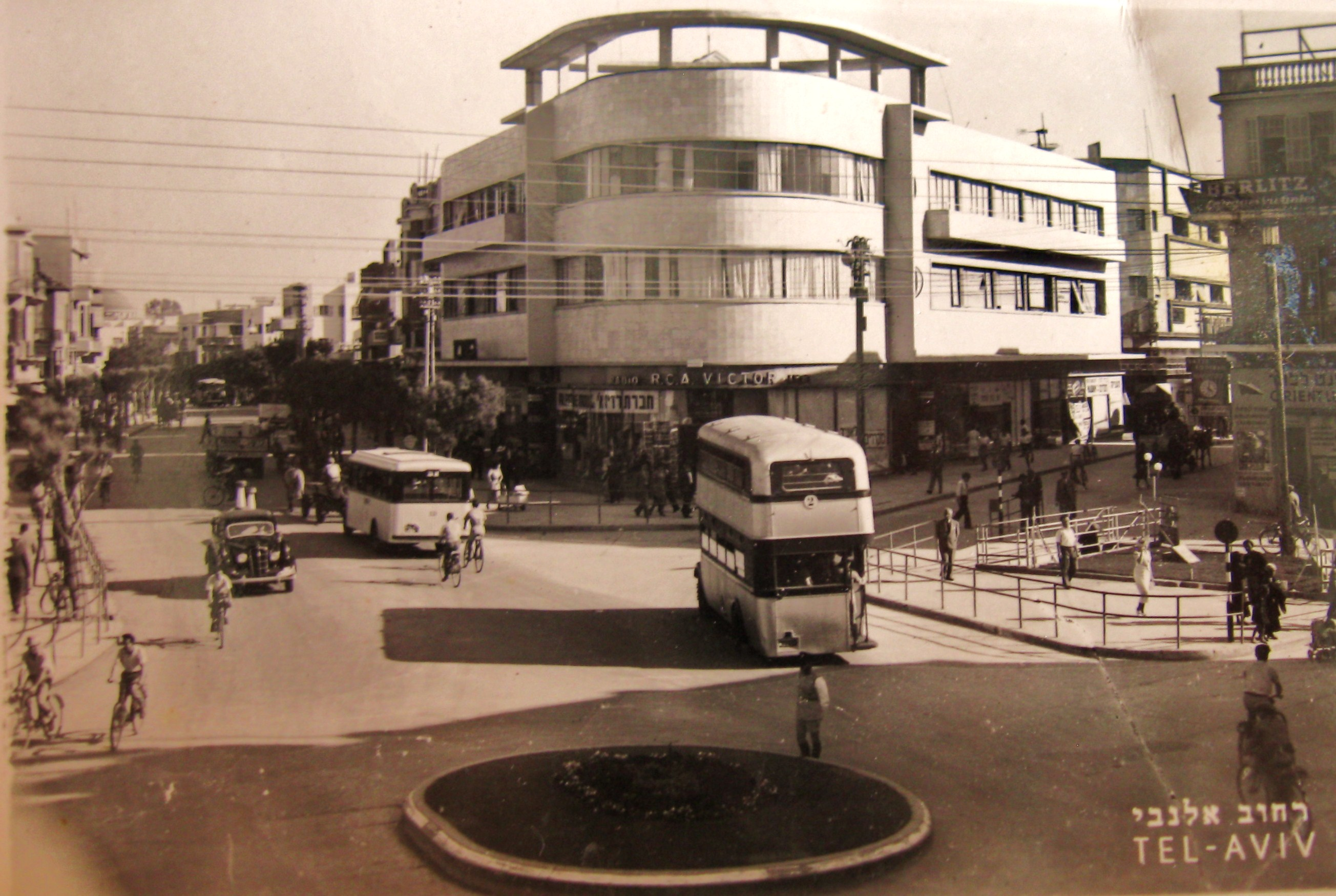
Tel Aviv in the 1930s

In 1918, the Jewish Legion assisted in the British conquest of Palestine. In 1920, the territory was divided between Britain and France under the mandate system, and the British-administered area (including modern Israel) was named Mandatory Palestine. Western powers finalized the partition at the San Remo conference. Previously in 1919, the US-led King–Crane Commission, the only comprehensive social survey of the era, had found overwhelming local opposition to the Zionist project and European rule. Arab opposition to British rule and Jewish immigration led to the 1920 Nebi Musa riots and formation of a Jewish militia known as the Haganah as an outgrowth of Hashomer, from which the Irgun and Lehi paramilitaries later split. In 1922, the League of Nations granted Britain the Mandate for Palestine under terms which included the Balfour Declaration with its promise to the Jews, and similar provisions regarding the Arab Palestinians. The area's population was predominantly Arab and Muslim, with Jews accounting for 11% and Arab Christians about 10%.

The Third (1919–23) and Fourth Aliyahs (1924–29) brought an additional 100,000 Jews to Palestine. Following the 1929 Palestine riots, the Hope Simpson Enquiry documented that land purchases by the Jewish National Fund and other Zionist organizations had led to the eviction of Arab tenant farmers and created an economically disenfranchised class of Arabs. Hope Simpson made recommendations including limiting Jewish immigration based on the absorptive capacity of Palestine.

The rise of Nazism and increased persecution of Jews in Europe led to the Fifth Aliyah, with an influx of 250,000 Jews. This was a cause of the 1936–39 Arab revolt, which was suppressed by British forces and Zionist militias. Several hundred British personnel and Jews were killed; 5,032 Arabs were killed. 10% of Palestinian Arab men were killed, wounded, imprisoned, or exiled.

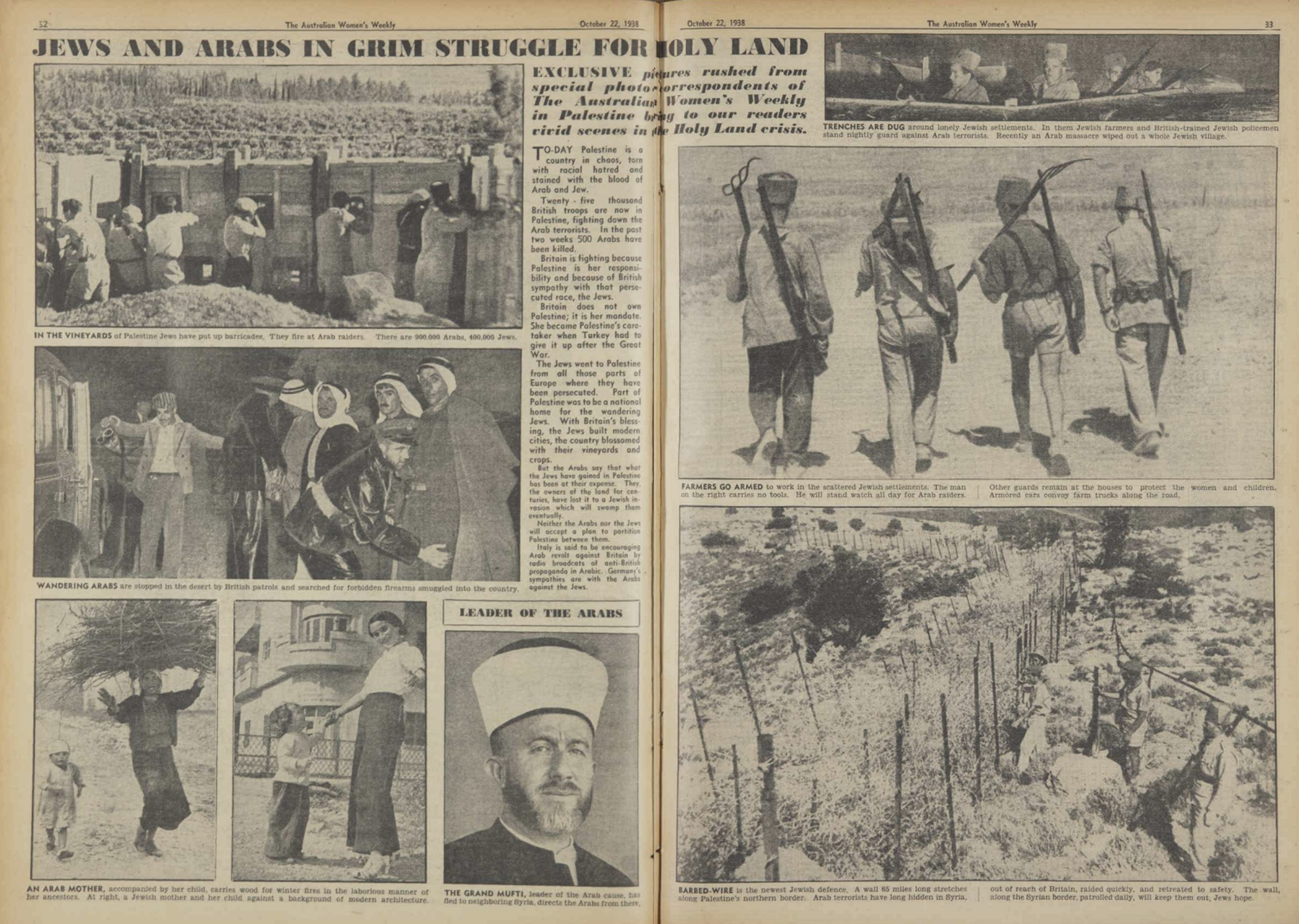
"Jews and Arabs in Grim Struggle for Holy Land", article from 1938

In the 1930s, Britain began considering proposals to partition Palestine. Although some Zionists opposed partition, David Ben-Gurion supported it while regarding it as temporary. In 1938, he stated that, after the establishment of the state and formation of a large army, they would "abolish partition" and "expand to the whole of Palestine".

The British introduced restrictions on Jewish immigration to Palestine with the White Paper of 1939. With countries turning away Jewish refugees fleeing the Holocaust, a clandestine movement known as Aliyah Bet was organised to bring Jews to Palestine. During World War II, Palestine was repeatedly bombed by Axis aircraft. About 30,000 Jews from Palestine served in the British military during the war, of whom around 700 were killed. 12,000 Palestinian Arabs served in the British military. At the end of the war, 31% of the population of Palestine was Jewish. The UK faced a Jewish insurgency over immigration restrictions from 1944, which intensified after the war, and continued conflict with the Arab community over limit levels. The Haganah joined Irgun and Lehi in a struggle against British rule. The Haganah attempted to bring tens of thousands of Jewish refugees and Holocaust survivors to Palestine. Most ships were intercepted by the Royal Navy and the refugees placed in detention camps in Atlit and Cyprus. The insurgency included attacks by Jewish organisations that killed civilians as well as British security personnel.

In July 1946, Irgun bombed the British administrative headquarters for Palestine in the King David Hotel, killing 91. The attack was intended to destroy documents that Irgun believed implicated the Jewish Agency in attacks against the British during Operation Agatha, a series of raids, including one on the Jewish Agency. The Jewish insurgency continued throughout 1946 and 1947 despite efforts by the British military and Palestine Police Force to suppress it.

British efforts to mediate with Jewish and Arab representatives were unsuccessful, as the Jews were unwilling to accept any solution that did not involve a Jewish state, and suggested a partition of Palestine into Jewish and Arab states. The Arabs were adamant that a Jewish state in any part of Palestine was unacceptable and the only solution was a unified Palestine under Arab rule. In February 1947, the British referred the issue to the UN. On 15 May 1947, the UN General Assembly resolved that a Special Committee be created "to prepare ... a report on the question of Palestine". The report proposed a plan to replace the British Mandate with "an independent Arab State, an independent Jewish State, and the City of Jerusalem [...] the last to be under an International Trusteeship System".

Meanwhile, the Jewish insurgency peaked in July 1947, with guerrilla raids culminating in the Sergeants affair, in which the Irgun took two British sergeants hostage as leverage against the planned execution of three Irgun operatives. After the executions, the Irgun killed the British soldiers. The incident caused outrage in the UK. In September 1947, Britain decided to evacuate Palestine as the Mandate was no longer tenable.

=== 1948 war and establishment of the State of Israel ===
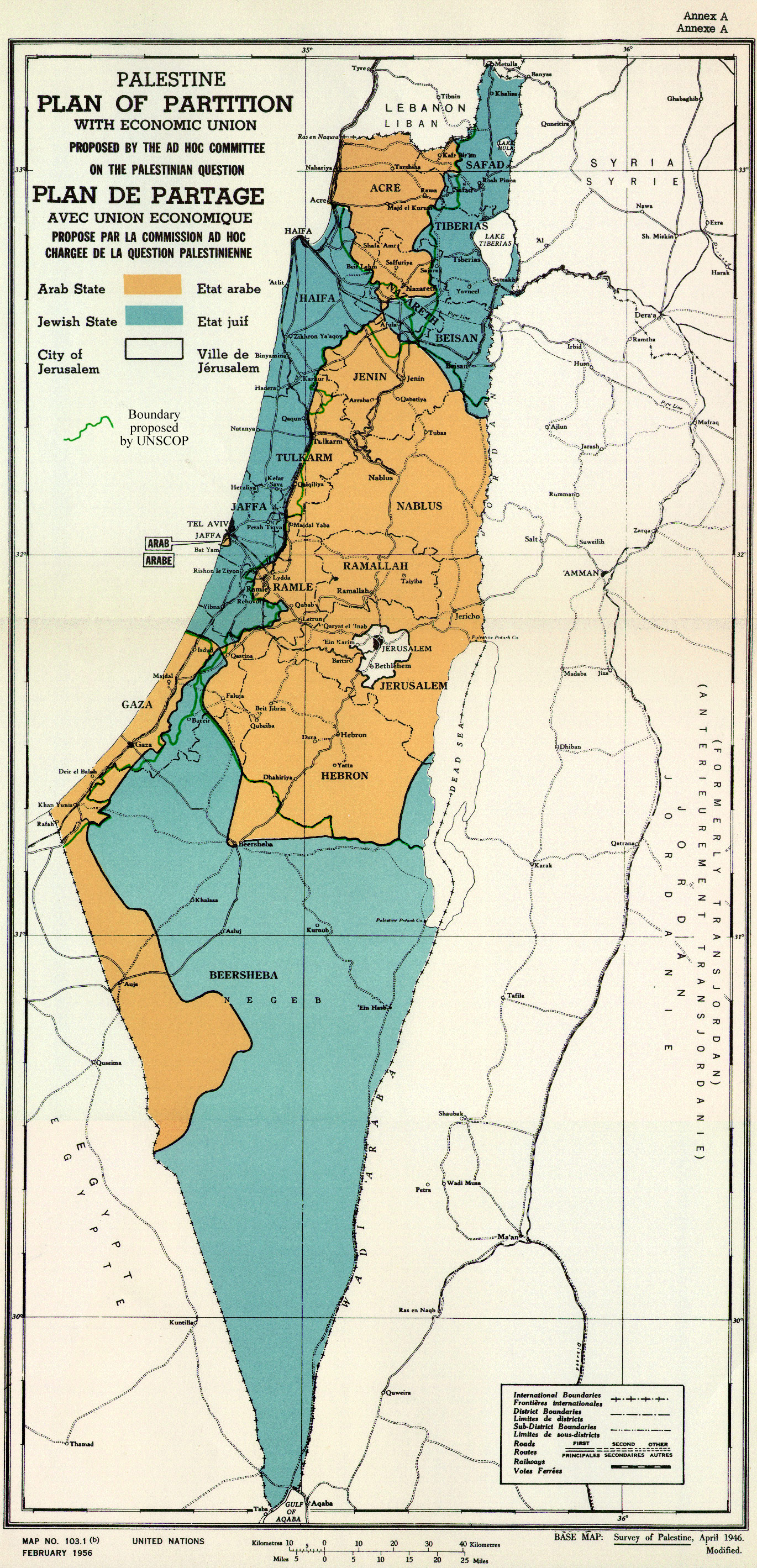
1947 partition plan of Palestine between Israel and the State of Palestine, as proposed by the United Nations

In November 1947, the General Assembly adopted Resolution 181 (II), which recommended partition of Mandatory Palestine into separate Jewish and Arab states, with Jerusalem under an international regime. The plan was that proposed in the September report, which allocated the larger share of territory (55%) to The Jewish Agency, the recognised representative of the Jewish community, despite the fact Jews were a third of the population, most of whom were recent immigrants, and owned 7% of the land. Arabs constituted the majority and owned 20% of the land, with the remainder held by the Mandate authorities or foreign landowners. The Jewish leadership accepted the plan but the Arab leadership rejected it.

The Arab League and Arab Higher Committee of Palestine responded that the plan privileged European interests over Palestinians, and "refuse[d] to be bound" by any resolution to divide the country. They argued the resolution was contrary to self-determination and Arabs constituted the majority of its "lawful inhabitants", who had consistently expressed their desire for their country to "remain united and undivided". In December 1947, the Arab Higher Committee proclaimed a strike, and riots broke out in Jerusalem. The situation spiralled into a civil war. Colonial Secretary Arthur Creech Jones announced that the British Mandate would end in May 1948: the British would evacuate. As Arab militias and gangs attacked Jewish areas, they were faced by the Haganah, and the smaller Irgun and Lehi. In April 1948, the Haganah moved onto the offensive, a phase that included the Deir Yassin massacre, in which Irgun and Lehi forces attacked the Arab village of Deir Yassin, killing 100 villagers.

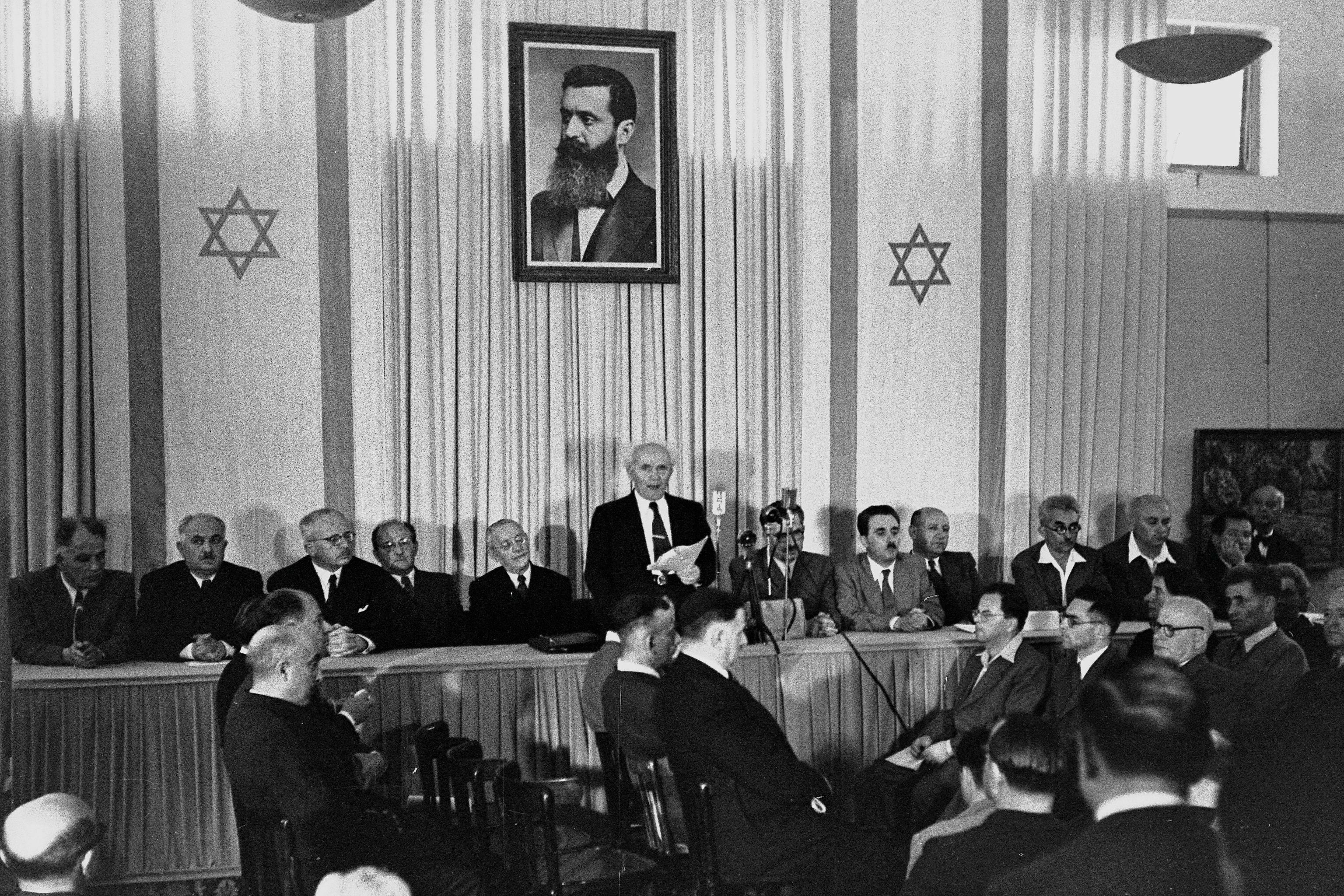
David Ben-Gurion declaring the establishment of Israel on 14 May 1948

On 14 May 1948, the day before the expiration of the British Mandate, David Ben-Gurion, the head of the Jewish Agency, declared "the establishment of a Jewish state in Eretz-Israel". The following day, the armies of four Arab countries—Egypt, Syria, Transjordan, and Iraq—entered what had been Mandatory Palestine, launching the 1948 Arab–Israeli War; contingents from Yemen, Morocco, Saudi Arabia, and Sudan joined the war. Their purpose was to prevent the establishment of the Jewish state. The Arab League stated the invasion was to restore order and prevent bloodshed.

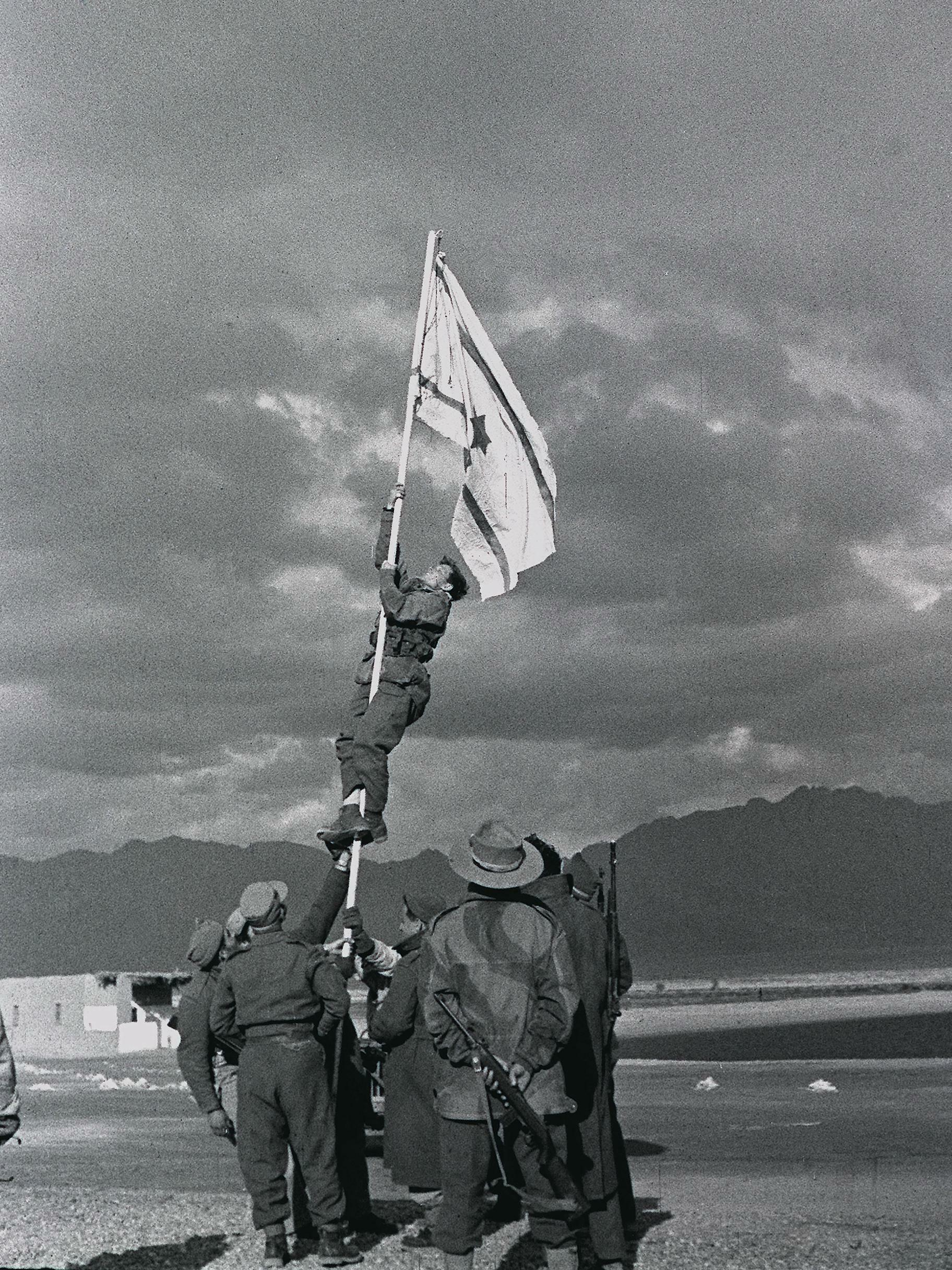
Raising of the Ink Flag on 10 March 1949, marking the end of the 1948 war

After a year of fighting, a ceasefire was declared and temporary borders established, known as the Green Line. Jordan annexed what became known as the West Bank, including East Jerusalem, and Egypt occupied the Gaza Strip. 700,000 Palestinians fled or were expelled by Zionist militias and the Israeli military—what would become known as the Nakba ('catastrophe'). This led to the destruction of most of Palestine's Arab culture, identity, and national aspirations. 156,000 Arabs remained and became Arab citizens of Israel.

Israel was admitted to the UN by Resolution 273 in May 1949. In the early years of the state, the Labour Zionist movement led by Prime Minister Ben-Gurion dominated Israeli politics. Immigration during the late 1940s and early 1950s was aided by the Israeli Immigration Department and the non-government sponsored Mossad LeAliyah Bet (lit. "Institute for Immigration B"). The latter engaged in clandestine operations, particularly in the Middle East and Eastern Europe, where Jewish lives were in danger and exit difficult. Immigration was in accordance with the One Million Plan. Some immigrants held Zionist beliefs or came for a better life, while others escaped persecution or were expelled.

An influx of Holocaust survivors and Jews from Arab and Muslim countries during the first three years increased the Jewish population from 700,000 to 1,400,000. By 1958, it had risen to two million. Between 1948 and 1970, approximately 1,150,000 Jewish refugees relocated to Israel. Some arrived as refugees and were housed in camps known as ma'abarot; by 1952, 200,000 people lived in these tent cities. Jews of European background were often treated more favourably than those from the Middle East and North Africa—housing units reserved for the latter were often re-designated for the former, so Jews from Arab lands generally ended up staying longer in transit camps. Food, clothes and furniture were rationed in this austerity period. The crisis led Ben-Gurion to sign a reparations agreement with West Germany that triggered protests by Jews angered that Israel could accept monetary compensation for the Holocaust.

There were further expulsions of Palestinians and during the 1950s, Israel was frequently attacked by Palestinian fedayeen, against civilians, mainly from the Egyptian-occupied Gaza Strip, leading to Israeli reprisal operations. In 1956, the UK and France aimed to regain control of the Suez Canal, which Egypt had nationalised. The blockade of the Canal and Straits of Tiran to Israeli shipping, together with fedayeen attacks and Arab threatening statements, prompted Israel to attack Egypt. Israel joined a secret alliance with the UK and France and overran the Sinai Peninsula in the Suez Crisis, but was pressured to withdraw by the UN, in return for shipping rights. The war resulted in reduction of Israeli border infiltration.

U.S. newsreel on the trial of Adolf Eichmann

In the early 1960s, Israel captured Nazi war criminal Adolf Eichmann in Argentina and brought him back for trial. In 1963, Israel engaged in a diplomatic standoff with the US concerning the Israeli nuclear programme.

Since 1964, Arab countries, concerned over Israeli plans to divert waters of the Jordan River into the coastal plain, had tried to divert the headwaters to deprive Israel of water, provoking tensions between Israel on the one hand, and Syria and Lebanon on the other. Arab nationalists led by Egyptian President Gamal Abdel Nasser refused to recognise Israel and called for its destruction. By 1966, Israeli-Arab relations had deteriorated into battles between their militaries.

In May 1967, Egypt massed its army near its border with Israel, expelled UN peacekeepers from the Sinai Peninsula, and blocked Israel's access to the Red Sea. Other Arab states mobilised their forces. Israel stated that this justified a pre-emptive strike (Operation Focus) against Egypt in June. Jordan, Syria and Iraq attacked Israel.

Territory held by Israel: before the Six-Day War after the war The Sinai Peninsula was returned to Egypt in 1982.

In the ensuing Six-Day War, Israel captured and occupied the West Bank from Jordan, the Gaza Strip and Sinai Peninsula from Egypt, and the Golan Heights from Syria. Israel expelled ~300,000 Palestinians from Gaza and the West Bank. Jerusalem's boundaries were enlarged, incorporating East Jerusalem. The Green Line became the administrative boundary between Israel and the occupied territories.

Following the 1967 war and the "Three Nos" resolution of the Arab League, Israel faced attacks from the Egyptians in the Sinai Peninsula during the 1967–70 War of Attrition, and from Palestinian groups targeting Israelis in the occupied territories, globally, and in Israel. Most important among the groups was the Palestine Liberation Organisation (PLO) which committed itself to "armed struggle as the only way to liberate the homeland". In the late 1960s and early 1970s, Palestinian groups launched attacks against Israeli and Jewish targets around the world, including the Munich massacre of Israeli athletes at the 1972 Summer Olympics. Israel responded with an assassination campaign against the organisers of the massacre, a bombing and a raid in Lebanon on the PLO headquarters.

On 6 October 1973, the Egyptian and Syrian armies launched a surprise attack against Israeli forces in the Sinai Peninsula and Golan Heights, opening the Yom Kippur War. The war ended on 25 October with Israel repelling Egyptian and Syrian forces. An internal inquiry exonerated the government of responsibility for failures before and during the war, but public anger forced Prime Minister Golda Meir to resign. In 1976, Air France Flight 139 from Israel to France was hijacked by Palestinian guerrillas; Israeli commandos rescued 102 of 106 Israeli hostages.

The 1977 elections marked a turning point in Israeli history as Menachem Begin's Likud took control from the Labor Party. Egyptian President Anwar El Sadat visited Israel and spoke before the Knesset in the first recognition of Israel by an Arab head of state. Sadat and Begin signed the Camp David Accords (1978) and the Egypt–Israel peace treaty (1979). In return, Israel withdrew from the Sinai Peninsula and entered negotiations over autonomy for Palestinians in the West Bank and Gaza Strip.

In 1978, a PLO raid from Lebanon led to the Coastal Road massacre. Israel responded with an invasion of Lebanon to destroy PLO bases. Begin's government provided incentives for Israelis to settle in the occupied West Bank, increasing friction with the Palestinians.

The 1980 Jerusalem Law was believed by some to reaffirm Israel's 1967 annexation of Jerusalem by decree and reignited international controversy over the status of the city. No Israeli legislation has defined the territory of Israel, and no act included East Jerusalem therein. In 1981 Israel annexed the Golan Heights. The international community rejected these moves, with the UN Security Council declaring the Jerusalem Law and Golan Heights Law void. Waves of Ethiopian Jews immigrated from the 1980s onwards, while between 1990 and 1994, immigration from the post-Soviet states increased Israel's population by twelve per cent.

In June 1981, during the Iran–Iraq War, Israel's air force destroyed Iraq's sole nuclear reactor, then under construction, to impede Iraq's nuclear weapons programme. Following PLO attacks in 1982, Israel invaded Lebanon to destroy the PLO bases. Israel destroyed PLO's military forces in Lebanon and defeated the Syrians. The Israeli Kahan Commission held Begin and several Israeli generals responsible for the Sabra and Shatila massacre and defence minister Ariel Sharon as bearing "personal responsibility". Sharon was forced to resign.

In 1985, Israel responded to a Palestinian terrorist attack in Cyprus by bombing PLO's headquarters in Tunisia. Israel withdrew from most of Lebanon in 1986 but continued to occupy a borderland buffer zone in Lebanon until 2000, from where Israeli forces engaged in conflict with Hezbollah. The First Intifada, a Palestinian uprising against Israeli rule, broke out in 1987, with demonstrations and violence in the occupied West Bank and Gaza. Over the following six years, the intifada became more organised and included economic and cultural measures aimed at disrupting the occupation. Over 1,000 people were killed. During the 1991 Gulf War, the PLO supported Saddam Hussein and Iraqi missile attacks against Israel. Despite public outrage, Israel heeded American calls to refrain from retaliation.

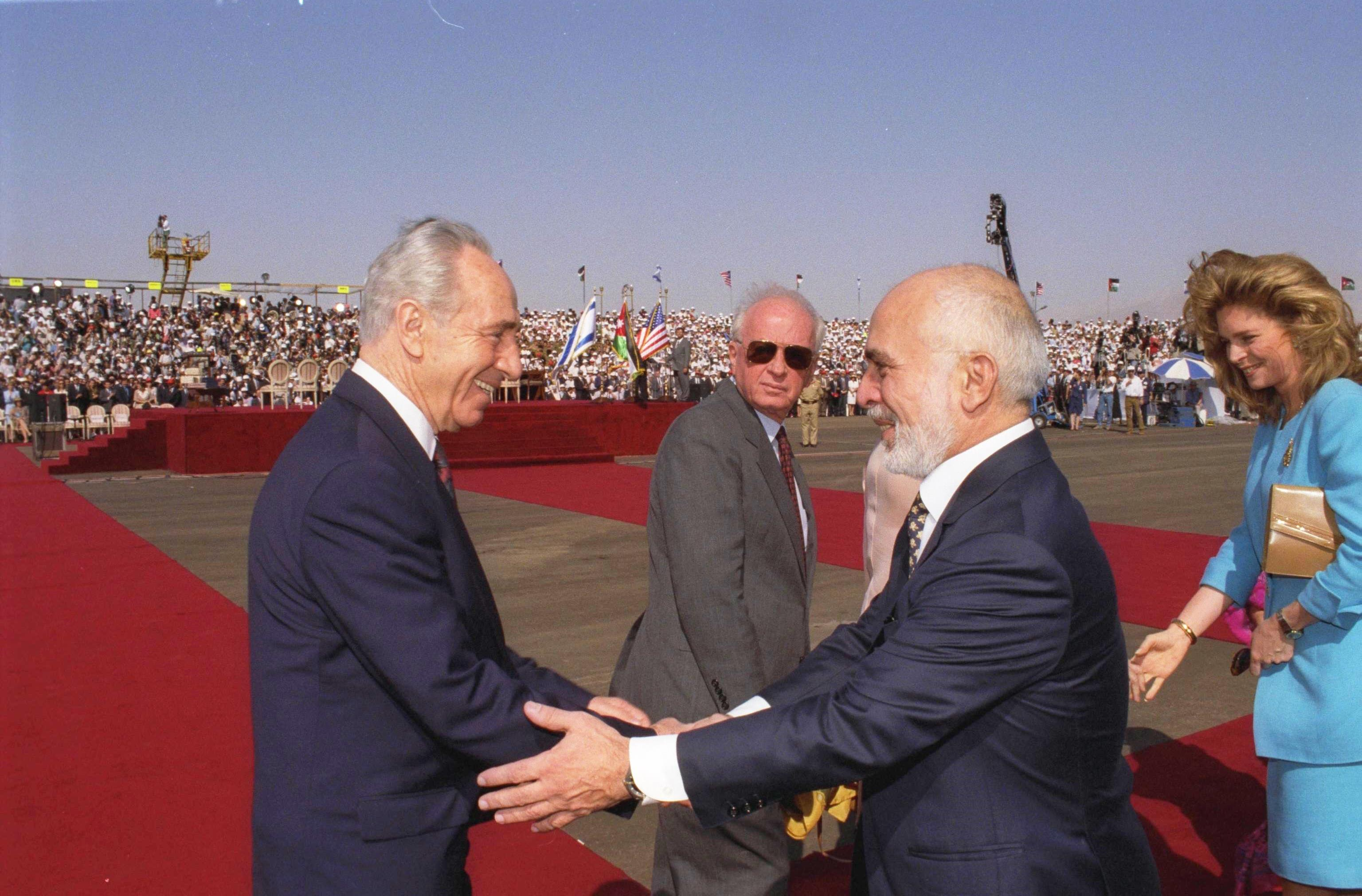
Shimon Peres (left) with Yitzhak Rabin (center) and King Hussein of Jordan (right), prior to signing the Israel–Jordan peace treaty in 1994

In 1992, Yitzhak Rabin became prime minister following an election in which his party called for compromise with Israel's neighbours. The following year, Shimon Peres, on behalf of Israel, and Yasser Arafat, for the PLO, signed the Oslo Accords, which gave the Palestinian National Authority (PNA) the right to govern parts of the West Bank and Gaza Strip. The PLO recognised Israel's right to exist and pledged an end to terrorism. In 1994, the Israel–Jordan peace treaty was signed. Arab public support for the Accords was damaged by the continuation of Israeli settlements and checkpoints, and deterioration of economic conditions. Israeli public support for the Accords waned after Palestinian suicide attacks. In 1995, Rabin was assassinated by a far-right Jew who opposed the Accords.

During Benjamin Netanyahu's premiership at the end of the 1990s, Israel agreed to withdraw from Hebron, though this was never implemented, and he signed the Wye River Memorandum. The agreement dealt with further redeployments in the West Bank and security. The memorandum was criticised by human rights organisations for its "encouragement" of human rights abuses. Ehud Barak, elected prime minister in 1999, withdrew forces from Lebanon and negotiated with PNA Chairman Arafat, and US President Bill Clinton, at the 2000 Camp David Summit. Barak offered a plan for the establishment of a Palestinian state, including all of Gaza and 90% of the West Bank, with Jerusalem as a shared capital. Each side blamed the other for the failure of the talks.

=== 21st century ===
In 2000, after a controversial visit by Sharon to the Temple Mount, the Second Intifada began. The uprising faced disproportionate repression from the Israeli state. Palestinian suicide attacks developed into a recurrent feature of the intifada. Some commentators contend the intifada was pre-planned by Arafat after the collapse of peace talks. Sharon became prime minister in a 2001 election; he carried out his plan to unilaterally withdraw from the Gaza Strip and spearheaded the construction of the West Bank barrier, ending the intifada. Between 2000-08, 1,063 Israelis, 5,517 Palestinians and 64 foreign citizens were killed.

In July 2006, a Hezbollah artillery assault on Israel's northern border communities and a cross-border abduction of Israeli soldiers precipitated the month-long Second Lebanon War, including an Israeli invasion of Lebanon. The war wound down in August after UN Resolution 1701; Israeli forces mostly withdrew from Lebanon by October but continued to occupy the Lebanese portion of Ghajar village. In 2007 the Israeli Air Force destroyed a nuclear reactor in Syria.

In 2008, a ceasefire between Hamas and Israel collapsed, resulting in a three-week Gaza War. In what Israel described as a response to over a hundred Palestinian rocket attacks on Israeli cities, Israel began an operation in the Gaza Strip in 2012, lasting eight days. Israel started another operation in Gaza following rocket attacks by Hamas in 2014. In 2021, more fighting took place in Gaza and Israel. By the 2010s, increasing regional cooperation between Israel and Arab League countries was established, culminating in the signing of the Abraham Accords. The Israeli security situation shifted from the traditional Arab–Israeli conflict towards the Iran–Israel proxy conflict and direct confrontation with Iran during the Syrian civil war.

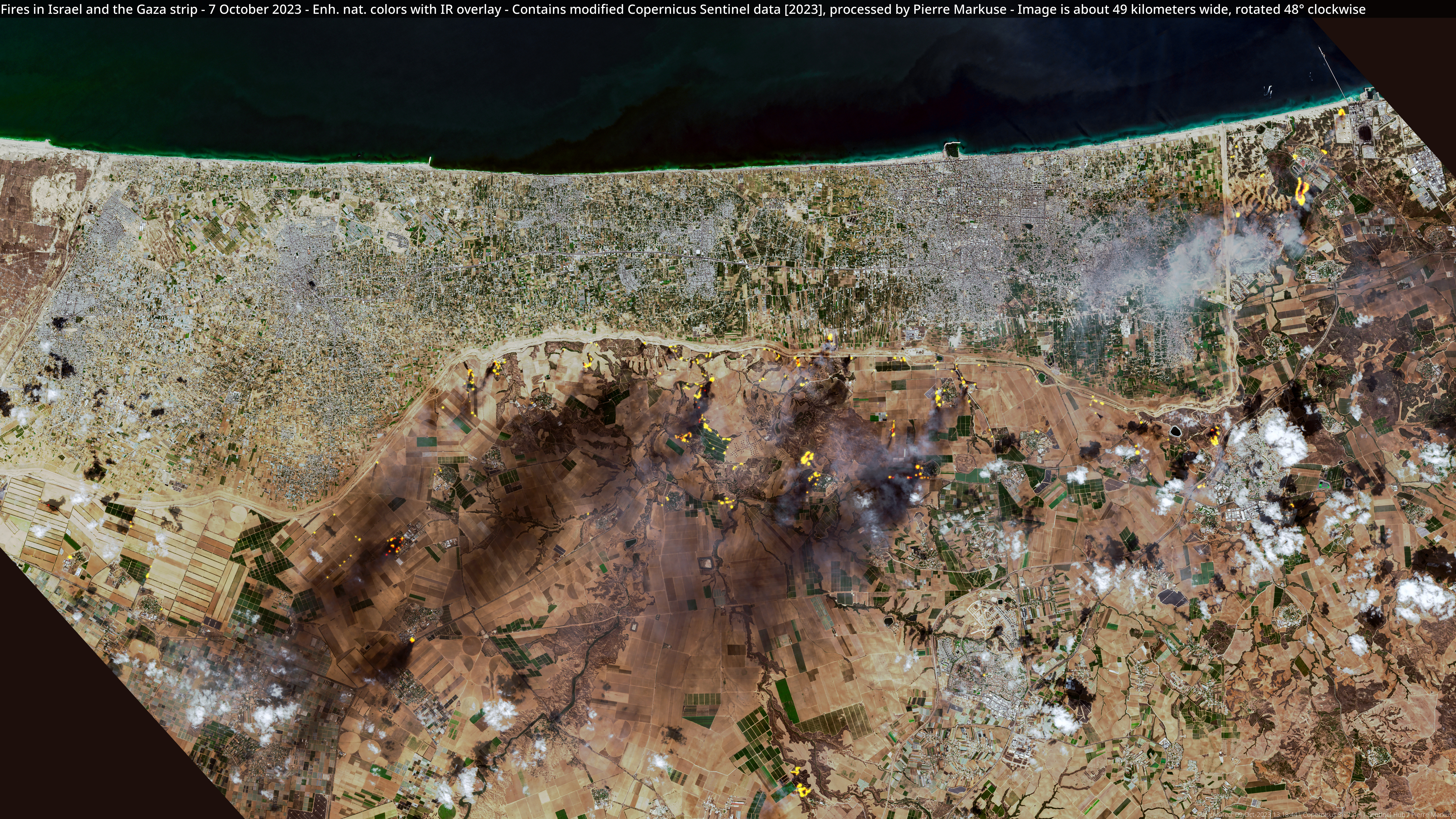
Satellite view of fires in the Gaza envelope on 7 October 2023

On 7 October 2023, Palestinian militant groups from Gaza, led by Hamas, launched coordinated attacks on Israel, leading to the Gaza war. On that day, approximately 1,300 Israelis, predominantly civilians, were killed in communities near the Gaza Strip border and during a music festival. 251 hostages were kidnapped and taken to Gaza. Studies modeling trauma exposure estimated that approximately 5% of Israelis may develop PTSD, with data showing that probable PTSD nearly doubled from 16% to 30% and rates of anxiety and depression rising sharply.

After clearing militants from its territory, Israel launched one of the most destructive bombing campaigns in modern history and invaded Gaza on 27 October with the stated objectives of destroying Hamas and freeing hostages. The fifth war of the Gaza–Israel conflict since 2008, it has been the deadliest for Palestinians in the entire Israeli–Palestinian conflict and the most significant military engagement in the region since the Yom Kippur War in 1973. A UN Special Committee, multiple governments, and various experts and human rights organisations have concluded that Israel is committing genocide against the Palestinian people due to the harm and loss of life inflicted on civilians during the Gaza War.

In April 2024, Israel initiated airstrikes on Iran, after Iranian strikes targeted Israel, marking the 2024 Iran–Israel conflict the first time the countries have directly exchanged fire. In October, Israel invaded Lebanon and exchanged missile barrages with Iran. After nearly a year of the Israel–Hezbollah conflict from October 2023 due to Hezbollah shooting rockets at Israel to support Hamas in Gaza, Israel assassinated Hezbollah secretary general Hassan Nasrallah in September 2024. A November 2024 ceasefire instructed Israel to withdraw from Lebanon, which Israel mostly did by February 2025, but against the agreement, Israeli forces stayed in military outposts on highlands in Southern Lebanon. In June 2025, Israel launched renewed airstrikes on Iran, targeting Iran's air defence systems, missile launchers, their military leadership, and their nuclear programme, which escalated into the Twelve-Day War. In February 2026, Israel and the US launched extensive airstrikes on Iran, assassinating Supreme Leader Ali Khamenei and sparking the 2026 Iran war and 2026 Lebanon war. The strikes aimed to destroy the Iranian military, nuclear programme, and achieve regime change.

== Geography ==
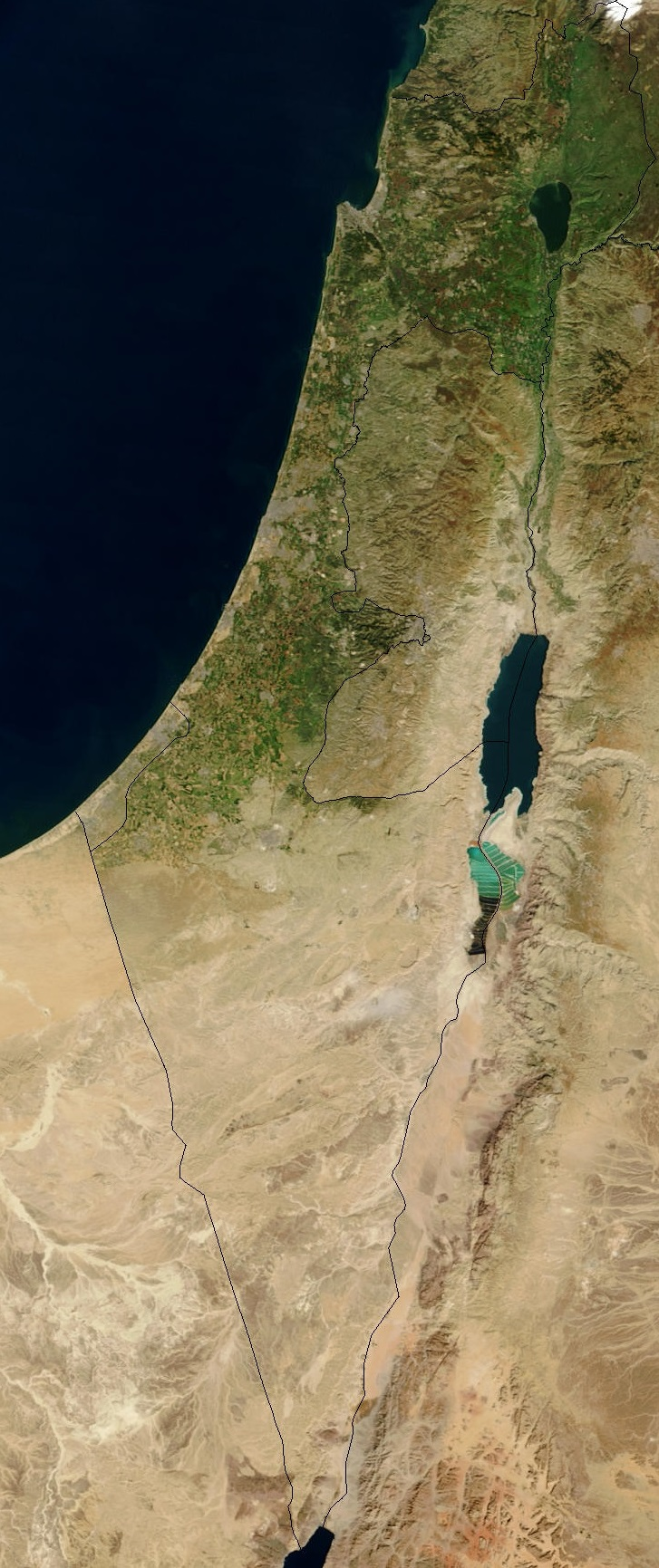
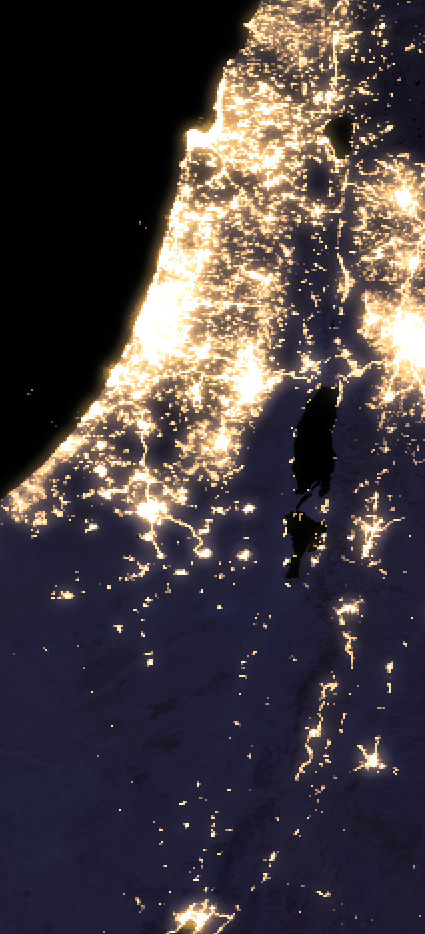
Satellite images of Israel and neighbouring territories during the day and night

Israel is located in the Levant area of the Fertile Crescent. At the eastern end of the Mediterranean Sea, it is bounded by Lebanon to the north, Syria to the north-east, Jordan and the West Bank to the east, and Egypt and the Gaza Strip to the south-west. It lies between latitudes 29° and 34° N, and longitudes 34° and 36° E.

The sovereign territory of Israel (according to the demarcation lines of the 1949 Armistice Agreements and excluding all territories captured by Israel during the 1967 Six-Day War) is approximately 20,770 square kilometres (8,019 sq mi), of which two per cent is water. However Israel is so narrow (100 km at its widest, compared to 400 km from north to south) that the exclusive economic zone in the Mediterranean is double the land area of the country. The total area under Israeli law, including East Jerusalem and the Golan Heights, is 22,072 square kilometres (8,522 sq mi), and the total area under Israeli control, including the military-controlled and partially Palestinian-governed territory of the West Bank, is 27,799 square kilometres (10,733 sq mi).

Despite its small size, Israel is home to a variety of geographic features, from the Negev desert in the south to the inland fertile Jezreel Valley, with mountain ranges of the Galilee, Carmel and towards the Golan in the north. The Israeli coastal plain on the shores of the Mediterranean is home to most of the population. East of the central highlands lies the Jordan Rift Valley, a small part of the 6,500-kilometre (4,039 mi) Great Rift Valley. The Jordan River runs along the Jordan Rift Valley, from Mount Hermon through the Hulah Valley and the Sea of Galilee to the Dead Sea, the lowest point on the surface of the Earth. Further south is the Arabah, ending with the Gulf of Eilat, part of the Red Sea. Makhtesh, or "erosion cirques" are unique to the Negev and the Sinai Peninsula, the largest being the Makhtesh Ramon at 38 km in length. Israel has the largest number of plant species per square metre of the countries in the Mediterranean Basin and contains four terrestrial ecoregions: Eastern Mediterranean conifer–sclerophyllous–broadleaf forests, Southern Anatolian montane conifer and deciduous forests, Arabian Desert, and Mesopotamian shrub desert. Forests accounted for 8.5% of the area in 2016, up from 2% in 1948, as the result of a large-scale forest planting programme by the Jewish National Fund.

=== Tectonics and seismicity ===
The Jordan Rift Valley is the result of tectonic movements within the Dead Sea Transform (DST) fault system. The DST forms the transform boundary between the African Plate to the west and the Arabian Plate to the east. The Golan Heights and all of Jordan are part of the Arabian Plate, while the Galilee, West Bank, Coastal Plain, and Negev along with the Sinai Peninsula are on the African Plate. This tectonic disposition leads to a relatively high seismic activity. The entire Jordan Valley segment is thought to have ruptured repeatedly, for instance during the last two major earthquakes along this structure in 749 and 1033. The deficit in slip that has built up since 1033 is sufficient to cause an earthquake of M_{w}~7.4.

The most catastrophic known earthquakes occurred in 31 BCE, 363, 749, and 1033 CE, that is every ca. 400 years on average. Destructive earthquakes strike about every 80 years, leading to serious loss of life. While stringent construction regulations are in place and recently built structures are earthquake resistant, as of 2007 many public buildings as well as 50,000 residential buildings did not meet the new standards and were "expected to collapse" if exposed to a strong earthquake.

=== Climate ===
The projections of the IPCC Sixth Assessment Report show clearly the impacts of climate change on Israel even at 2 degrees of warming.

Temperatures vary widely, especially during the winter. Coastal areas, such as those of Tel Aviv and Haifa, have a typical Mediterranean climate with cool, rainy winters and long, hot summers. The area of Beersheba and the northern Negev have a semi-arid climate with hot summers, cool winters, and fewer rainy days. The southern Negev and the Arabah areas have a desert climate with very hot, dry summers, and mild winters with few days of rain. The highest temperature of 54 °C (129 °F) was recorded in 1942 in the Tirat Zvi kibbutz. Mountainous regions can be windy and cold, and areas at elevation of 750 metres (2,460 ft) or more (same elevation as Jerusalem) usually receive at least one snowfall each year. From May to September, rain is rare.

There are four different phytogeographic regions, due to its location between the temperate and tropical zones. For this reason, the flora and fauna are extremely diverse. There are 2,867 known species of plants in Israel. Of these, at least 253 species are introduced and non-native. There are 380 Israeli nature reserves.

With scarce water resources, Israel has developed various water-saving technologies, including drip irrigation. The considerable sunlight available for solar energy makes Israel the leading nation in solar energy use per capita—practically every house uses solar panels for water heating. The Ministry of Environmental Protection has reported that climate change "will have a decisive impact on all areas of life", particularly for vulnerable populations.

== Government and politics ==
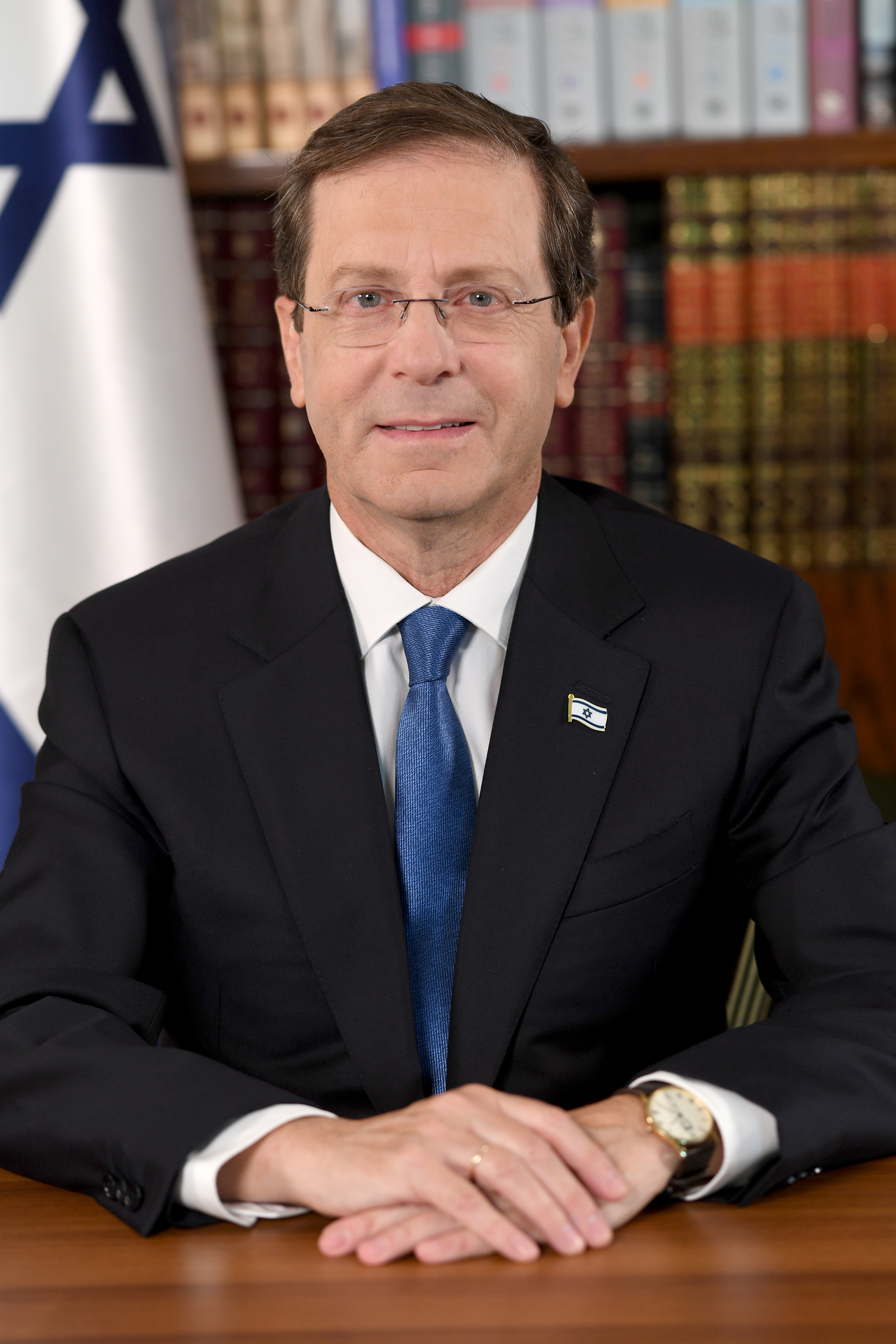
Isaac Herzog
President

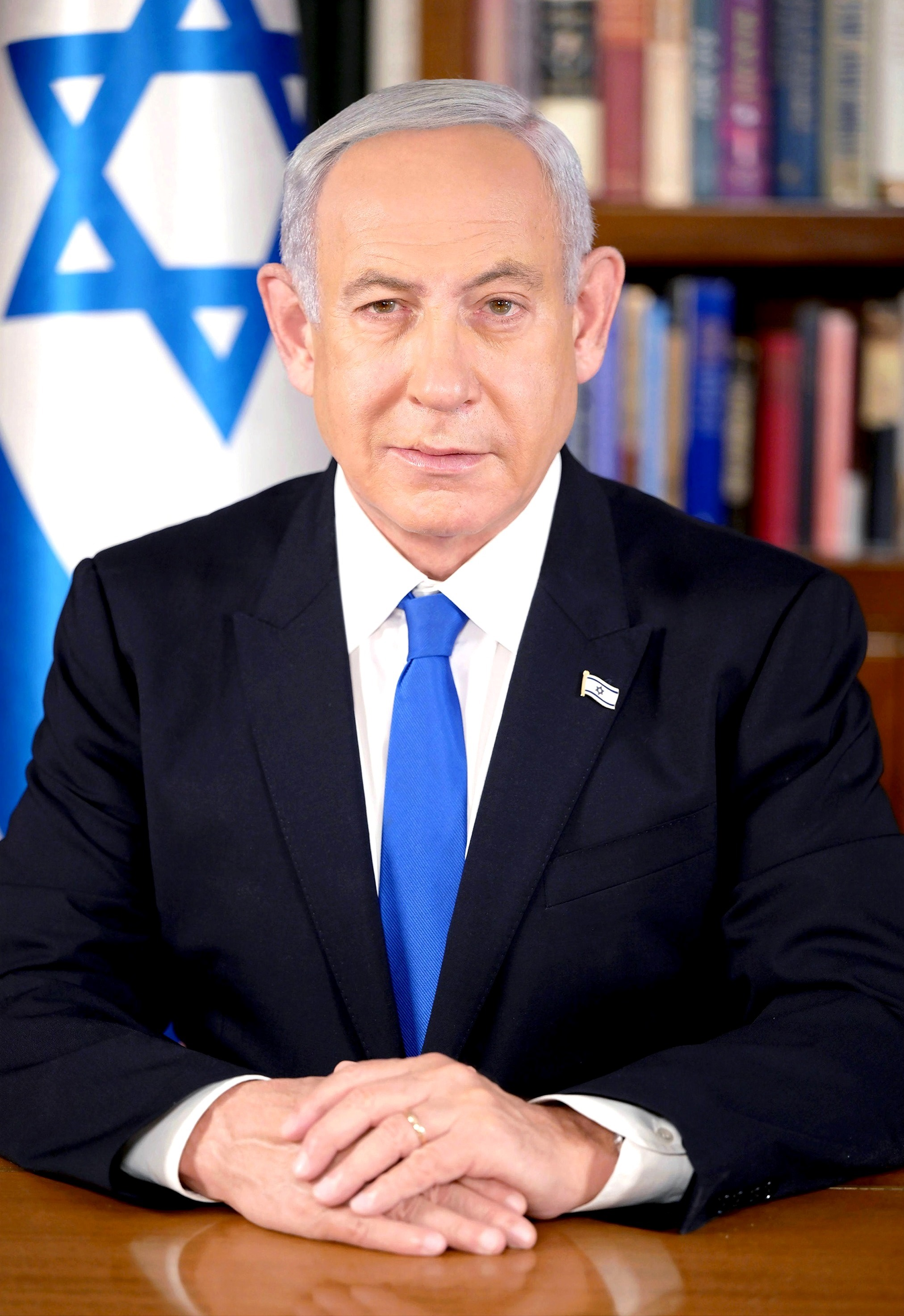
Benjamin Netanyahu
Prime Minister

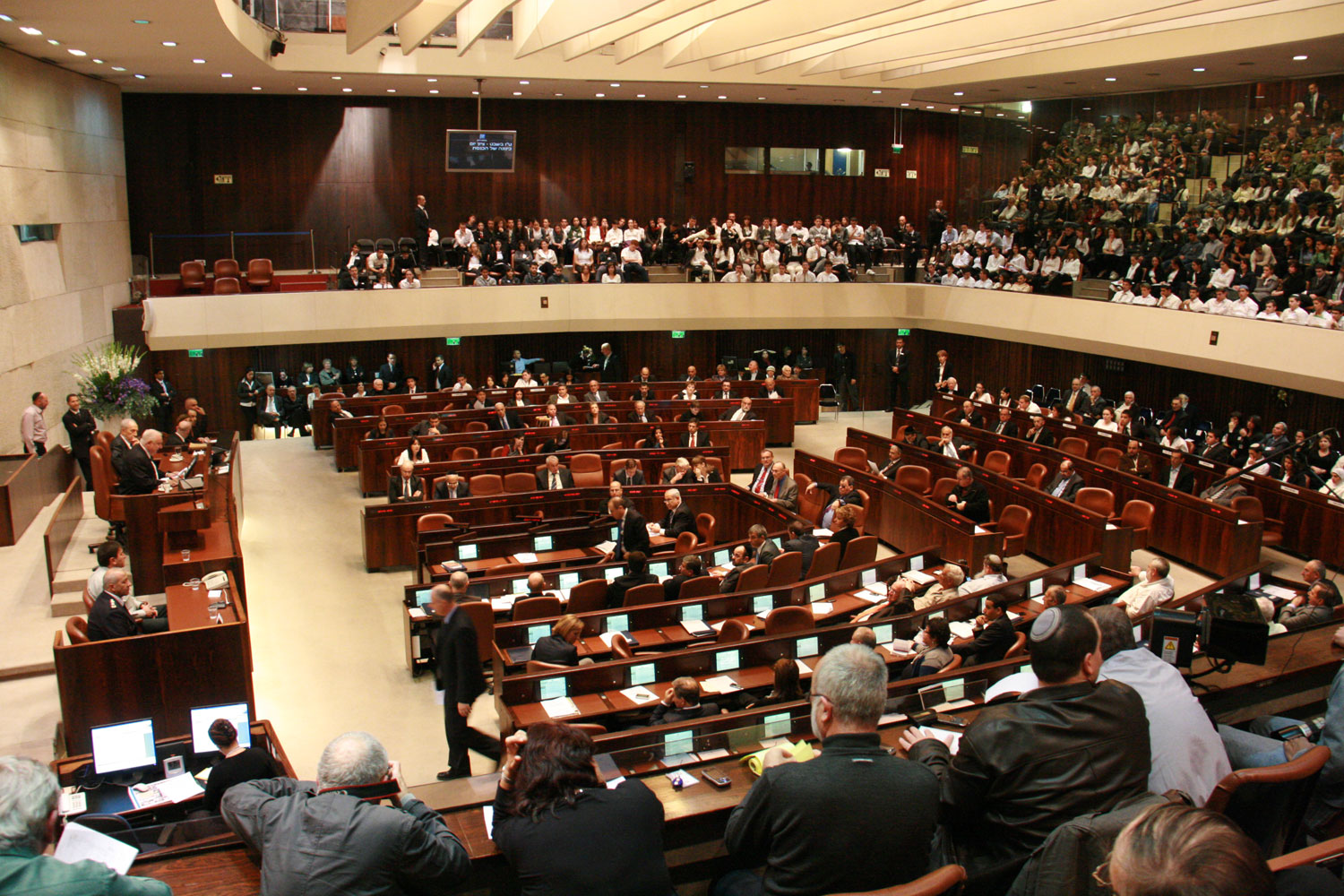
The Knesset chamber, home to the Israeli parliament

Israel has a parliamentary system, proportional representation and universal suffrage. A member of parliament supported by a parliamentary majority becomes the prime minister—usually this is the chair of the largest party. The prime minister is the head of government and of cabinet. The president is head of state, with largely ceremonial duties.

Israel is governed by a 120-member parliament, known as the Knesset. Membership of the Knesset is based on proportional representation of political parties, with a 3.25% electoral threshold, which in practice has resulted in coalition governments. Residents of Israeli settlements in the West Bank are eligible to vote, and after the 2015 election, 10 of the 120 members of the Knesset (8%) were settlers. Parliamentary elections are scheduled every four years, but unstable coalitions or a no-confidence vote can dissolve a government earlier. The first Arab-led party was established in 1988, and as of 2022, Arab-led parties hold about 10% of seats. A party cannot run for election to the Knesset if its objectives or actions include the "negation of the existence of the State of Israel as the state of the Jewish people".

The Basic Laws of Israel function as an uncodified constitution. These define Israel as a Jewish and democratic state and the nation-state of exclusively the Jewish people. In 2003, the Knesset began to draft an official constitution based on these laws.

Israel has no official religion, but the definition of the state as "Jewish and democratic" creates a strong connection with Judaism. On 19 July 2018, the Knesset passed a Basic Law that characterises Israel as principally a "Nation State of the Jewish People" and Hebrew as its official language. The bill ascribes an undefined "special status" to the Arabic language. The same bill gives Jews a unique right to national self-determination and views the developing of Jewish settlement in the country as "a national interest", empowering the government to "take steps to encourage, advance and implement this interest".

=== Administrative divisions ===

The State of Israel is divided into six main administrative districts, known as mehozot (Hebrew: מחוזות; sing.: mahoz)—Center, Haifa, Jerusalem, North, South, and Tel Aviv, as well as the Judea and Samaria Area in the West Bank. All of the Judea and Samaria Area and parts of the Jerusalem and Northern districts are not recognised internationally as part of Israel. The Northern, Central, Southern, and Haifa districts are further divided into 13 sub-districts known as nafot (Hebrew: נפות; sing.: nafa), which are further partitioned into 47 “natural regions.” (Note: Jerusalem and Haifa do not have sub-districts, but are partitioned into two and three natural regions, respectively.)

District	Capital	Largest city	Population, 2021			
District	Capital	Largest city	Jews	Arabs	Total	note
Jerusalem	Jerusalem		66%	32%	1,209,700	^{a}
North	Nof HaGalil	Nazareth	42%	54%	1,513,600	
Haifa	Haifa		67%	25%	1,092,700	
Center	Ramla	Rishon LeZion	87%	8%	2,304,300	
Tel Aviv	Tel Aviv		92%	2%	1,481,400	
South	Beersheba	Ashdod	71%	22%	1,386,000	
Judea and Samaria Area	Ariel	Modi'in Illit	98%	0%	465,400	^{b}

^a Including 361,700 Arabs and 233,900 Jews in East Jerusalem, as of 2020.
^b Israeli citizens only.

=== Israeli citizenship law ===
The 1950 Law of Return grants Jews the unrestricted right to immigrate to Israel and obtain Israeli citizenship. Individuals born within the country receive birthright citizenship if at least one parent is a citizen. Israeli law defines Jewish nationality as distinct from Israeli nationality, and the Supreme Court of Israel has ruled that an Israeli nationality does not exist. A Jewish national is defined as any person practicing Judaism and their descendants.

=== Israeli-occupied territories ===
Overview of administration and sovereignty in Israel, the Palestinian territories and the Golan Heights
Area		Administered by	Recognition of governing authority	Sovereignty claimed by	Recognition of claim
Gaza Strip		Palestinian National Authority (de jure) Controlled by Hamas (de facto)	Witnesses to the Oslo II Accord	Palestine	157 UN member states
West Bank	Palestinian enclaves (Areas A and B)	Palestinian National Authority and Israeli military	Witnesses to the Oslo II Accord	Palestine	157 UN member states
West Bank	Area C	Israeli enclave law (Israeli settlements) and Israeli military (Palestinians under Israeli occupation)	Witnesses to the Oslo II Accord	Palestine	157 UN member states
West Bank	East Jerusalem	Israeli administration	Honduras, Guatemala, Nauru, and the United States	Palestine	China, Russia
West Jerusalem		Israeli administration	Russia, Czech Republic, Honduras, Guatemala, Nauru, and the United States	United Nations as an international city along with East Jerusalem	Various UN member states and the European Union; joint sovereignty also widely supported
Golan Heights		Israeli administration	United States and Colombia	Syria	All UN member states except the United States and Colombia
Israel (Green Line border)		Israeli administration	165 UN member states	Israel	165 UN member states

Map of Israel showing the West Bank, the Gaza Strip, and the Golan Heights

In 1967, as a result of the Six-Day War, Israel captured and occupied the West Bank (including East Jerusalem) from Jordan, the Gaza Strip and the Sinai Peninsula from Egypt, and the Golan Heights from Syria. After an agreement was reached between Israel and Syria a year after the Yom Kippur War, a buffer zone monitored by the United Nations Disengagement Observer Force (UNDOF) was established in 1974. Also sparked by the war, Egypt and Israel reached an agreement due to the 1978 Camp David Accords and 1979 Egypt-Israel Peace Treaty, both mediated by American President Jimmy Carter. Egypt agreed to recognise Israel and demilitarise the Sinai, in exchange for Israel to fully return the Sinai to Egypt in 1982; however, Egypt refused to take in the Gaza Strip and it therefore remained under Israeli occupation until the 2005 disengagement plan. Between 1982-2000, Israel occupied southern Lebanon, in what was known as the Security Belt. Since capture of these territories, Israeli settlements and military installations have been built within each, except Lebanon.

The Golan Heights and East Jerusalem have been incorporated under Israeli law but not under international law. Israel has applied civilian law to both areas and granted their inhabitants permanent residency status and the ability to apply for citizenship. The UN Security Council has declared the annexation of the Golan Heights and East Jerusalem to be "null and void" and views the territories as occupied. The status of East Jerusalem has been a difficult issue in negotiations between Israel and representatives of the Palestinians.

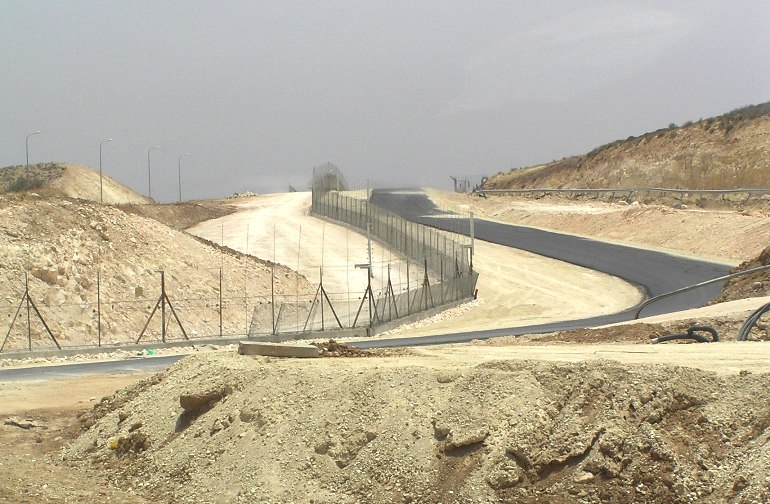
The Israeli West Bank barrier is a separation barrier built by Israel along the Green Line and inside parts of the West Bank.

The West Bank is known as the Judea and Samaria Area. The 400,000 Israeli settlers residing here are considered part of Israel's population, have Knesset representation, are subject to a large part of Israel's civil and criminal laws, and their output is considered part of Israel's economy. The land is not considered part of Israel under Israeli law, as Israel has refrained from annexing the territory, without relinquishing its legal claim to the land or defining a border. Israeli political opposition to annexation stems from the perceived "demographic threat" of incorporating the West Bank's Palestinian population into Israel. Outside of the Israeli settlements, the West Bank remains under direct Israeli military rule, and Palestinians in the area cannot become Israeli citizens.

The international community maintains that Israel does not have sovereignty in the West Bank and considers Israel's control to be the longest military occupation in modern history. The West Bank was occupied and annexed by Jordan in 1950, following the 1949 Armistice Agreements. Only Britain recognised this annexation, and Jordan has since ceded its claim to the territory to the PLO. The population is mainly Palestinians, including refugees of the 1948 Arab–Israeli War. From their occupation in 1967 until 1993, the Palestinians living in these territories were under Israeli military administration. Since the Israel–PLO letters of recognition, most of the Palestinian population and cities have been under the internal jurisdiction of the Palestinian Authority, and only partial Israeli military control, although Israel has redeployed its troops and reinstated military administration during periods of unrest. Israel's claim of universal suffrage has been questioned due to its blurred territorial boundaries, its simultaneous extension of voting rights to Israeli settlers in the occupied territories and denial of voting rights to their Palestinian neighbours, as well as the alleged ethnocratic nature of the state.

The Gaza Strip is considered to be a "foreign territory" under Israeli law. Israel and Egypt operate a land, air, and sea blockade of the Gaza Strip. The Gaza Strip was occupied by Israel after 1967. In 2005, as part of a unilateral disengagement plan, Israel removed its settlers and forces from the territory but continues to maintain control of its airspace and waters. The international community, including numerous international humanitarian organisations and UN bodies, consider Gaza to remain occupied. From 2007, when Hamas assumed power in the Gaza Strip, Israel tightened control of the Gaza crossings along its border, as well as by sea and air, and prevented persons from entering and exiting except for cases it deemed humanitarian. Gaza has a border with Egypt, and an agreement between Israel, the EU, and the PA governs how border crossings take place. The application of democracy to its Palestinian citizens and the selective application of Israeli democracy in the Israeli-controlled Palestinian territories have been criticised.

==== International opinion ====
The International Court of Justice said, in its 2004 advisory opinion on the legality of the construction of the West Bank barrier, that the lands captured by Israel in the Six-Day War are occupied territory and the construction of the wall within the occupied Palestinian territory violates international law. Most negotiations relating to the territories have been on the basis of Security Council Resolution 242, which emphasises "the inadmissibility of the acquisition of territory by war", and calls on Israel to withdraw from occupied territories in return for normalisation of relations with Arab states ("Land for peace"). Israel has been criticised for engaging in systematic and widespread violations of human rights in the occupied territories, including occupation and war crimes against civilians. The allegations include violations of international humanitarian law by the UN Human Rights Council. The U.S. State Department has called reports of abuses of significant human rights of Palestinians "credible" both within Israel and the occupied territories. Amnesty International and other NGOs have documented mass arbitrary arrests, torture, unlawful killings, systemic abuses and impunity in tandem with a denial of the right to Palestinian self-determination. Prime Minister Netanyahu has defended the country's security forces for protecting the innocent from terrorists and expressed contempt for what he describes as a lack of concern about the human rights violations committed by "criminal killers".

The international community widely regards Israeli settlements in the occupied territories illegal under international law. United Nations Security Council Resolution 2334 states that Israel's settlement activity constitutes a "flagrant violation" of international law and demands that Israel stop such activity and fulfill its obligations as an occupying power under the Fourth Geneva Convention. A United Nations special rapporteur concluded that the settlement programme was a war crime under the Rome Statute, and Amnesty found that the settlement programme constitutes an illegal transfer of civilians into occupied territory and "pillage", which is prohibited by the Hague Conventions and Geneva Conventions as well as being a war crime under the Rome Statute.

In a 2024 advisory opinion, the International Court of Justice stated that occupation of the Palestinian territories violated international law; Israel should end its occupation as quickly as possible and pay reparations. The court found that Israel was in breach of article 3 of the International Convention on the Elimination of All Forms of Racial Discrimination, which requires states to prevent, prohibit and eradicate all practices of racial segregation and apartheid.

==== Accusations of apartheid ====
Treatment of Palestinians within the occupied territories and to a lesser extent in Israel itself have drawn widespread accusations that it is guilty of apartheid, a crime against humanity and the International Convention on the Suppression and Punishment of the Crime of Apartheid. The Washington Post's 2021 survey of scholars and academic experts on the Middle East found an increase from 59% to 65% of these scholars describing Israel as a "one-state reality akin to apartheid". The claim that Israel's policies for Palestinians within Israel or within Israeli-occupied territories amount to apartheid has been affirmed by Israeli human rights organisation B'tselem, University Network for Human Rights, and international human rights organisations such as Amnesty and Human Rights Watch. Israeli human rights organisation Yesh Din has accused Israel of apartheid. Amnesty's claim was criticised by politicians and representatives from Israel and its allies such as the US, the UK, the European Commission, Australia, Netherlands and Germany, while the accusations were welcomed by Palestinians and the Arab League. In 2022, Michael Lynk, a law professor appointed by the UN Human Rights Council said the situation met the legal definition of apartheid, and concluded: "Israel has imposed upon Palestine an apartheid reality in a post-apartheid world". Subsequent reports from his successor, Francesca Albanese and from the Independent International Commission of Inquiry on the Occupied Palestinian Territory echoed the opinion.

In 2024, the ICJ held public hearings on the legal consequences arising from the policies and practices of Israel in the occupied Palestinian territory. During the hearings, 24 states and three international organisations said Israeli practices breached the prohibition of apartheid and/or amounted to prohibited acts of racism. The ICJ in its 2024 advisory opinion found Israel's occupation constitutes systemic discrimination and breaches Article 3 of the International Convention on the Elimination of All Forms of Racial Discrimination, which prohibits racial segregation and apartheid. The opinion is silent as to whether the discrimination amounts to apartheid; individual judges were split.

=== Foreign relations ===
Israel States that recognize Israel States that recognize Israel, but have suspended relations States that do not recognize Israeli statehood

Israel maintains diplomatic relations with 165 UN member states, the Holy See, Kosovo, the Cook Islands and Niue. It has 107 diplomatic missions; countries with which it has no diplomatic relations include most Muslim countries. Six out of 22 nations in the Arab League have normalised relations with Israel. Israel remains formally in a state of war with Syria, dating back uninterrupted to 1948. It has been in a similarly formal state of war with Lebanon since the end of the Lebanese Civil War in 2000, with the Israel–Lebanon border remaining unagreed by treaty.

Despite the peace treaty between Israel and Egypt, Israel is still widely considered an enemy country among Egyptians. Iran withdrew its recognition of Israel during the Islamic Revolution. Israeli citizens may not visit Syria, Lebanon, Iraq, Saudi Arabia, and Yemen without permission from the Ministry of the Interior. As a result of the 2008–09 Gaza War, Mauritania, Qatar, Bolivia, and Venezuela suspended political and economic ties with Israel, though Bolivia renewed ties in 2019.

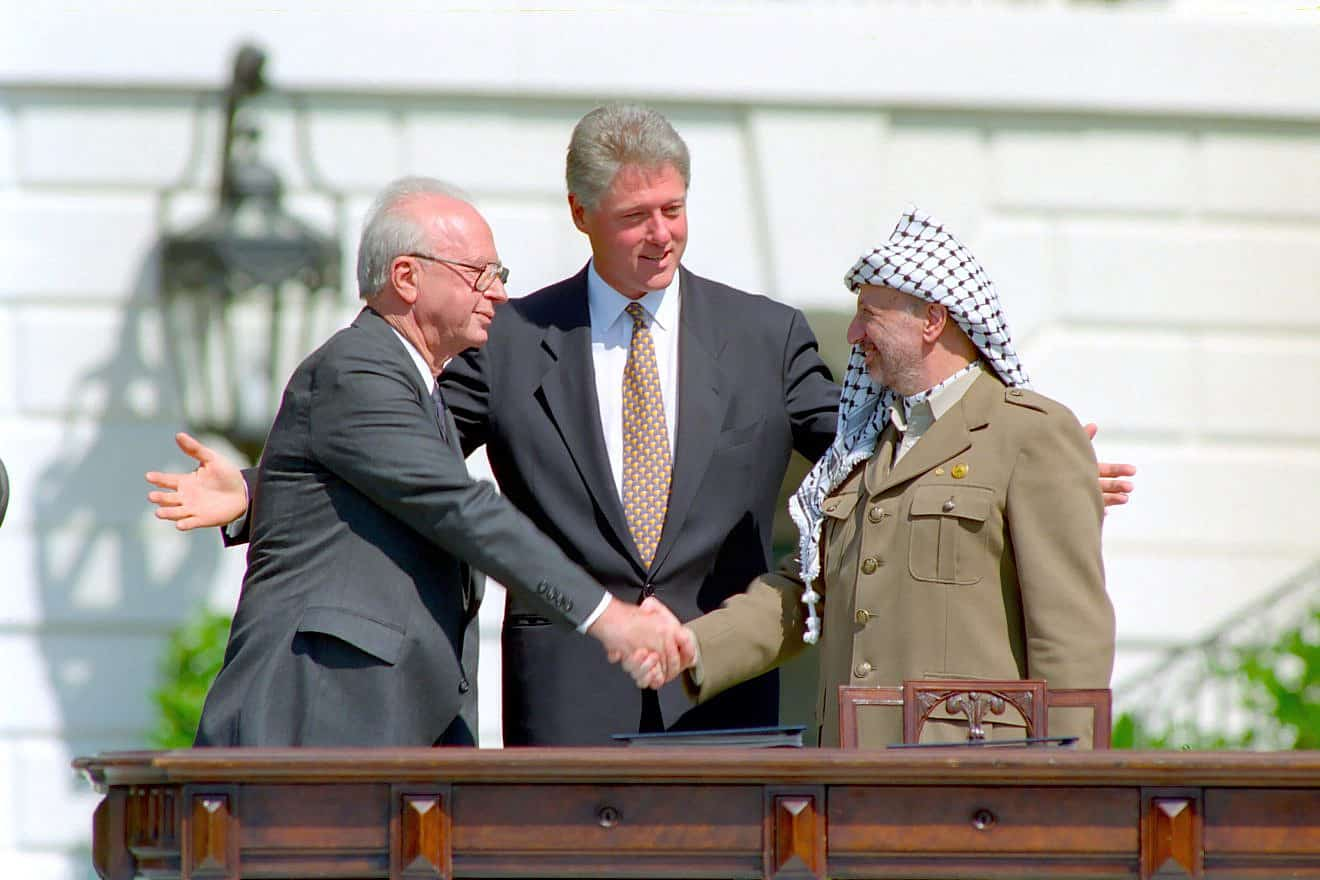
Yitzhak Rabin and Yasser Arafat at the signing ceremony of the Oslo Accords peace agreements, with then US President Bill Clinton (center)

The United States and the Soviet Union were the first two countries to recognise the State of Israel, having declared recognition roughly simultaneously. Diplomatic relations with the Soviet Union were broken in 1967 following the Six-Day War and renewed in 1991. The United States regards Israel as its "most reliable partner in the Middle East", based on "common democratic values, religious affinities, and security interests". The US has provided $68 billion in military assistance and $32 billion in grants to Israel since 1967, under the Foreign Assistance Act (period beginning 1962), more than any other country for that period until 2003. Most surveyed Americans have held consistently favourable views of Israel. The United Kingdom is seen as having a "natural" relationship with Israel because of the Mandate for Palestine. By 2007, Germany had paid 25 billion euros in reparations to Israel and individual Israeli Holocaust survivors. Israel is included in the European Union's European Neighbourhood Policy.

Although Turkey and Israel did not establish full diplomatic relations until 1991, Turkey has cooperated with the Jewish state since its recognition of Israel in 1949. Turkey's ties to other Muslim-majority nations in the region have at times resulted in pressure from Arab and Muslim states to temper its relationship with Israel. Relations took a downturn after the 2008–09 Gaza War and Israel's raid of the Gaza flotilla. Relations between Greece and Israel have improved since 1995 after decline of Israeli–Turkish relations. The two countries have a defence cooperation agreement and in 2010, the Israeli Air Force hosted Greece's Hellenic Air Force in a joint exercise. The joint Cyprus-Israel oil and gas explorations centred on the Leviathan gas field are an important factor for Greece, given its strong links with Cyprus. Cooperation in the world's longest submarine power cable, the EuroAsia Interconnector, has strengthened Cyprus–Israel relations.

Azerbaijan is one of the few majority Muslim countries to develop strategic and economic relations with Israel. Kazakhstan also has an economic and strategic partnership with Israel. India established full diplomatic ties with Israel in 1992 and has fostered a strong military, technological and cultural partnership with the country since then. India is the largest customer of the Israeli military equipment, and Israel is the second-largest military partner of India after Russia. Ethiopia is Israel's main ally in Africa due to common political, religious and security interests.

As of 2025, Israel is the only UN member state to recognise the Republic of Somaliland.

==== Foreign aid ====
Israel has a history of providing emergency foreign aid and humanitarian response to disasters across the world. In 1955 Israel began its foreign aid programme in Burma and then shifted to Africa. Israel's humanitarian efforts officially began in 1957 with the establishment of Mashav, the Israel's Agency for International Development Cooperation. In this early period, whilst Israel's aid represented only a small percentage of total aid to Africa, its programme was effective in creating goodwill; however, following the 1967 war relations soured. Israel's foreign aid programme subsequently shifted its focus to Latin America.

Since the late 1970s Israel's foreign aid has gradually decreased, although in recent years Israel has tried to reestablish aid to Africa. There are additional Israeli humanitarian and emergency response groups that work with the government, including IsraAid, a joint programme run by Israeli organisations and North American Jewish groups, ZAKA, The Fast Israeli Rescue and Search Team, Israeli Flying Aid, Save a Child's Heart and Latet. Between 1985 and 2015, Israel sent 24 delegations of their search and rescue unit the Home Front Command to 22 countries. Currently Israeli foreign aid ranks low among OECD nations, spending less than 0.1% of its GNI on development assistance. The country ranked 38th in the 2018 World Giving Index.

=== Military ===
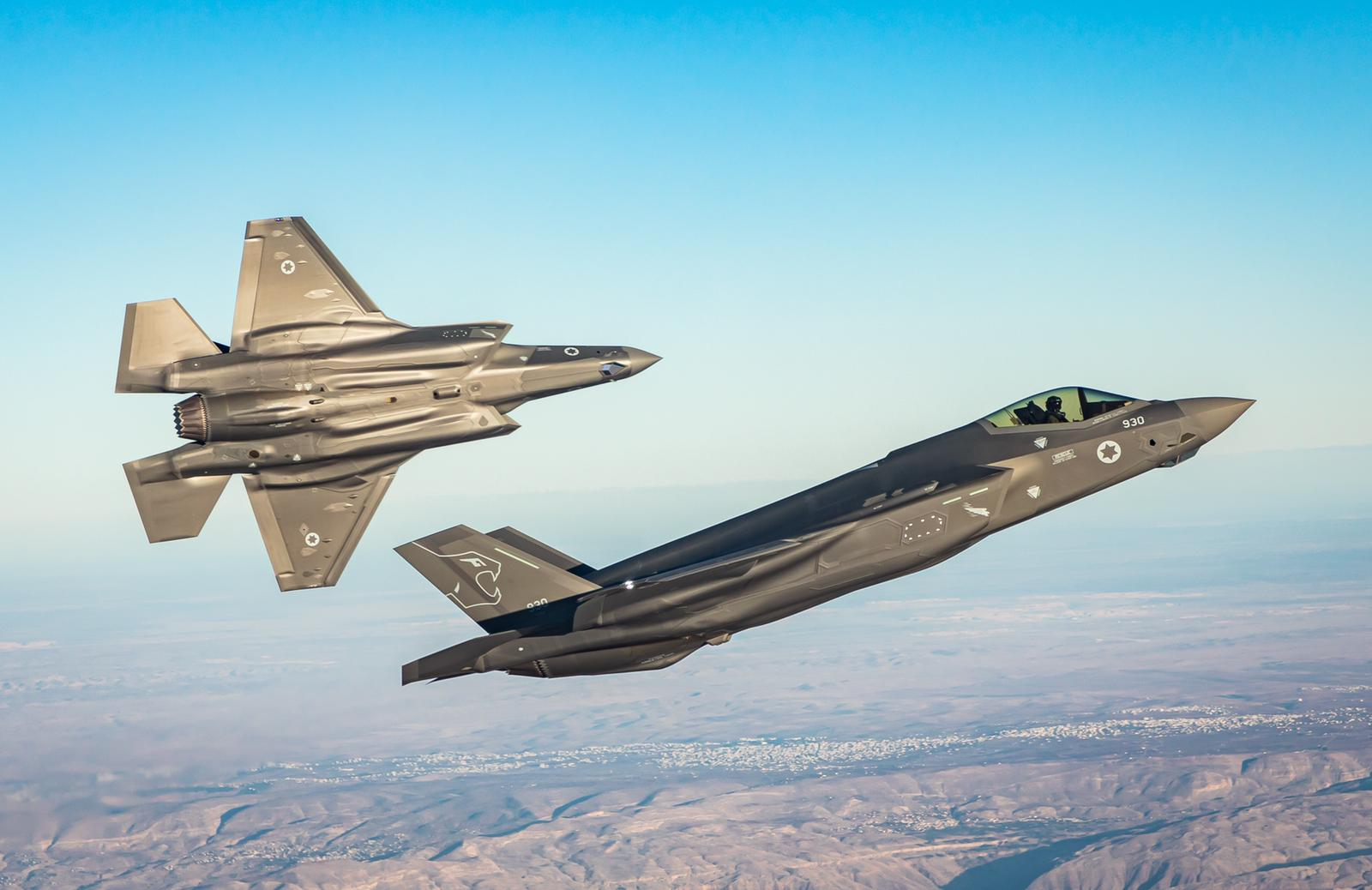
F-35 fighter jets of the Israeli Air Force

The Israel Defense Forces (IDF) is the sole military wing of the Israeli security forces and is headed by its Chief of the General Staff, the Ramatkal, subordinate to the Cabinet. The IDF consists of the army, air force and navy. It was founded during the 1948 Arab–Israeli War by consolidating paramilitary organisations, chiefly the Haganah. The IDF also draws upon the resources of the Military Intelligence Directorate (Aman).

Most Israelis are conscripted at age 18. Men serve two years and eight months, and women serve two years. Following mandatory service, Israeli men join the reserve forces and usually do up to several weeks of reserve duty every year until their forties. Most women are exempt from reserve duty. Arab citizens of Israel (except the Druze) and those engaged in full-time religious studies are exempt, although the exemption of yeshiva students has been a source of contention. An alternative for those who receive exemptions on various grounds is Sherut Leumi, or national service, which involves a programme of service in social welfare frameworks. A small minority of Israeli Arabs also volunteer in the army. As a result of its conscription programme, the IDF maintains approximately 176,500 active troops and 465,000 reservists, giving Israel one of the world's highest percentage of citizens with military training.

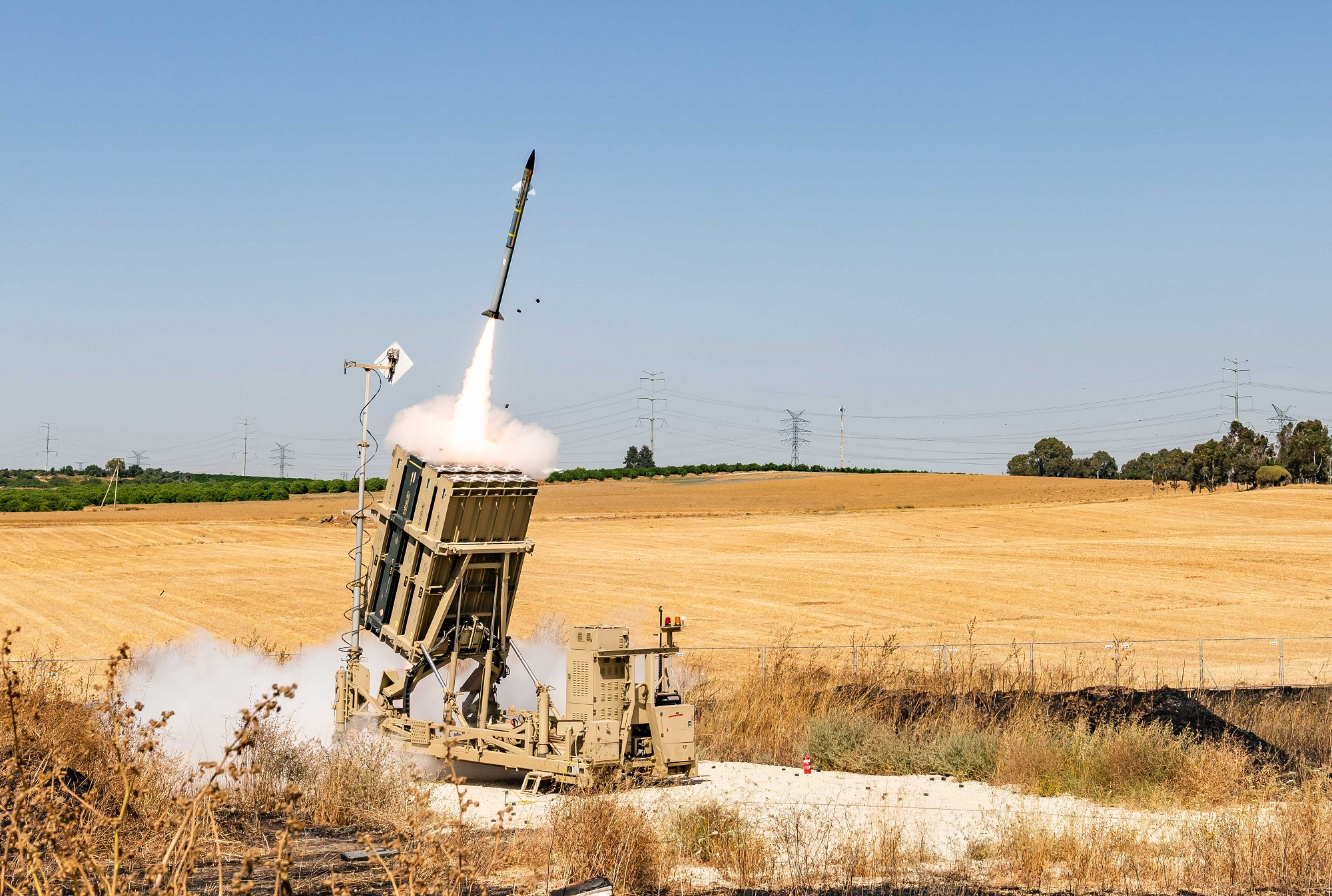
Iron Dome is the world's first operational anti-artillery rocket defence system.

The military relies heavily on high-tech weapons systems designed and manufactured in Israel as well as some foreign imports. The Arrow missile is one of the world's few operational anti-ballistic missile systems. The Python air-to-air missile series is often considered one of the most crucial weapons in its military history. Israel's Spike missile is one of the most widely exported anti-tank guided missiles in the world. Israel's Iron Dome anti-missile air defence system gained worldwide acclaim after intercepting hundreds of rockets fired by Palestinian militants from the Gaza Strip. Since the Yom Kippur War, Israel has developed a network of reconnaissance satellites. The Ofeq programme has made Israel one of seven countries capable of launching such satellites.

Israel is widely believed to possess nuclear weapons and per a 1993 report, chemical and biological weapons of mass destruction. Israel has not signed the Treaty on the Non-Proliferation of Nuclear Weapons and maintains a policy of deliberate ambiguity towards its nuclear capabilities. The Israeli Navy's Dolphin submarines are believed to be armed with nuclear missiles offering second-strike capability. Since the Gulf War in 1991, all homes in Israel are required to have a reinforced security room, Merkhav Mugan, impermeable to chemical and biological substances.

Since Israel's establishment, military expenditure constituted a significant portion of the country's gross domestic product, with peak of 30.3% of GDP in 1975. In 2021, Israel ranked 15th in the world by total military expenditure, with $24.3 billion, and 6th by defence spending as a percentage of GDP, with 5.2%. Since 1974, the United States has been a particularly notable contributor of military aid. Under a memorandum of understanding signed in 2016, the U.S. is expected to provide the country with $3.8 billion per year, or around 20% of Israel's defence budget, from 2018 to 2028. Israel ranked 8th globally for arms exports in 2020–2024. The majority of Israel's arms exports are unreported for security reasons. Israel is consistently rated low in the Global Peace Index, ranking 134th out of 163 nations in 2022.

=== Legal system ===
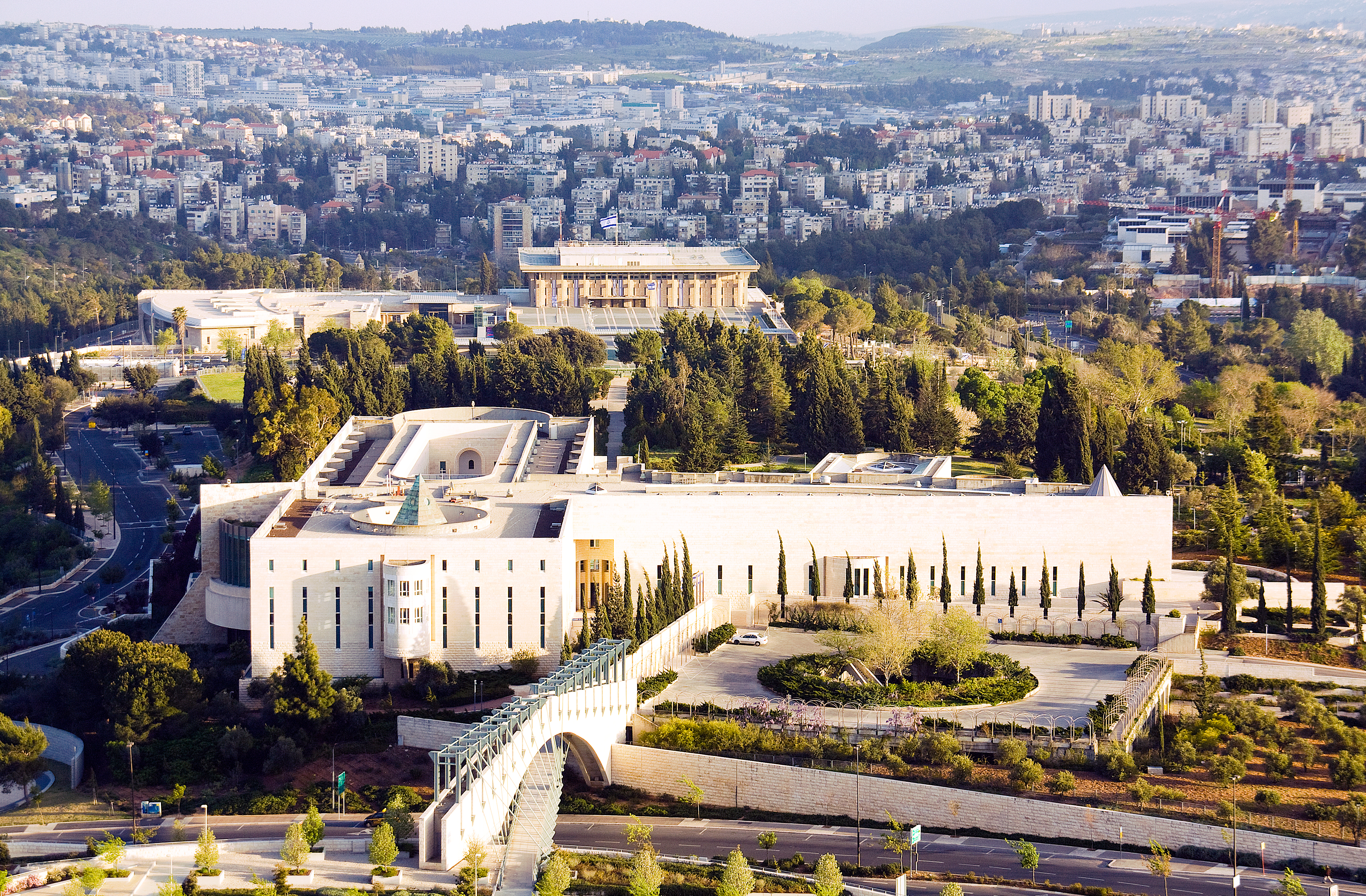
Supreme Court of Israel, Givat Ram, Jerusalem

Israel has a three-tier court system. At the lowest level are magistrate courts, situated in most cities across the country. Above them are district courts, serving as both appellate courts and courts of first instance; they are situated in five of Israel's six districts. The third and highest tier is the Supreme Court, located in Jerusalem; it serves a dual role as the highest court of appeals and the High Court of Justice. In the latter role, the Supreme Court rules as a court of first instance, allowing both citizens and non-citizens to petition against the decisions of state authorities.

The legal system combines three legal traditions: English common law, civil law, and Jewish law. It is based on the principle of stare decisis (precedent) and is an adversarial system. Court cases are decided by professional judges. Marriage and divorce are under the jurisdiction of the religious courts: Jewish, Muslim, Druze, and Christian. The election of judges is carried out by a selection committee chaired by the justice minister (currently Yariv Levin). Israel's Basic Law: Human Dignity and Liberty seeks to defend human rights and liberties in Israel. The United Nations Human Rights Council and Israeli human rights organisation Adalah have highlighted that this law does not in fact contain a general provision for equality and non-discrimination. As a result of "Enclave law", large portions of Israeli civil law are applied to Israeli settlements and Israeli residents in the occupied territories. Israeli law is seldom enforced in the occupied territories, with 96% of police investigations into settler violence in the West Bank from 2020 to 2025 ending without an indictment. No one has been charged in the killings of at least 1,100 Palestinian civilians by Israeli soldiers and settlers since 2020.

== Economy ==
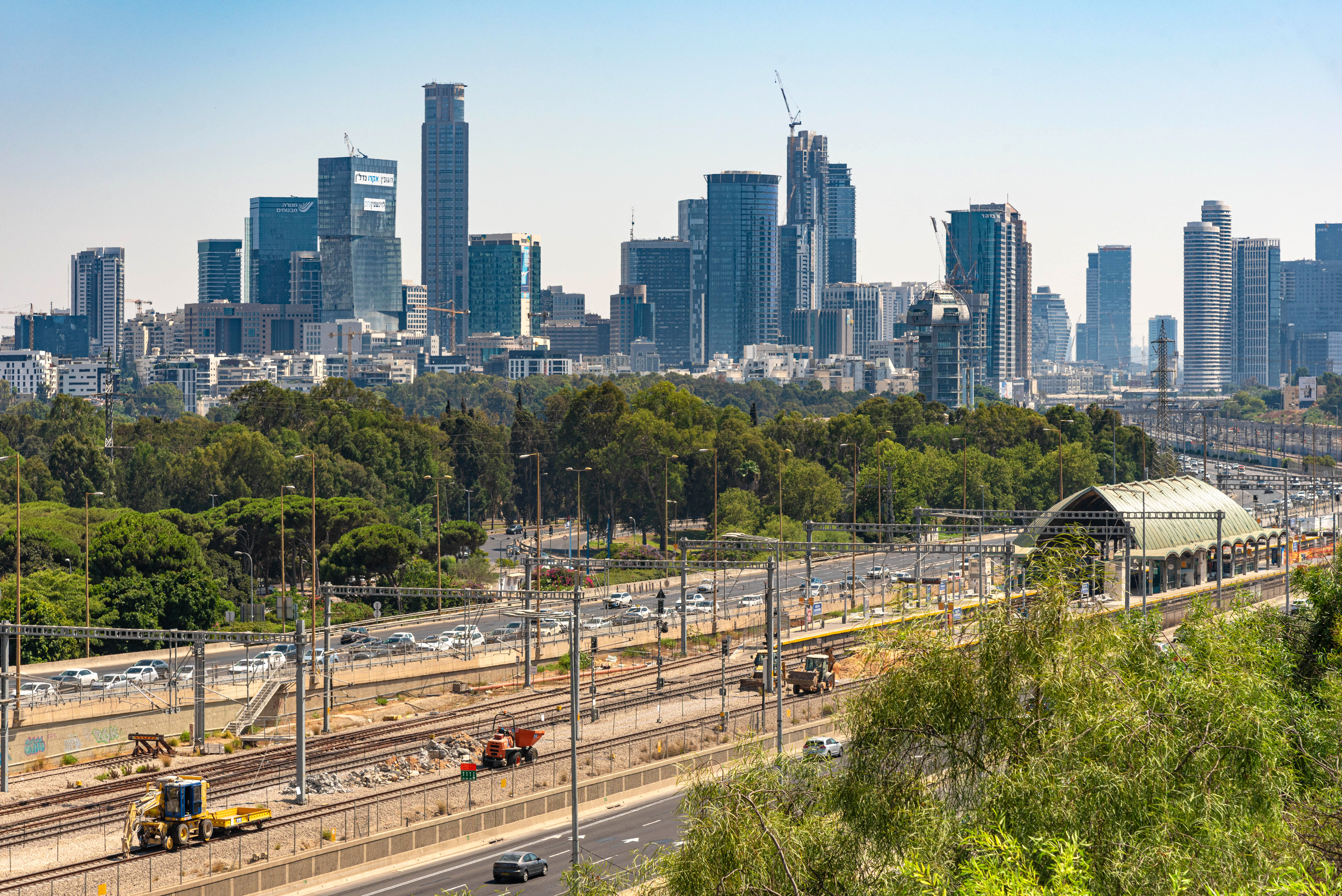
The Diamond Exchange District in Ramat Gan

Israel is considered the most advanced country in West Asia and the Middle East in economic and industrial development. As of 2023, the IMF estimated its GDP at 522 billion dollars and GDP per capita at 53 thousand (ranking 13th worldwide). It is the third richest country in Asia by nominal per capita income and has the highest average wealth per adult in the Middle East. The Economist ranked Israel as the fourth most successful economy among the developed countries for 2022. It has the most billionaires in the Middle East and the 18th most in the world. In recent years, Israel had one of the highest growth rates in the developed world. In 2010, it joined the OECD. The country is ranked 35th on the World Bank's Ease of Doing Business index. Economic data covers the economic territory of Israel, including the Golan Heights, East Jerusalem and Israeli settlements in the West Bank.

Despite limited natural resources, intensive development of the agricultural and industrial sectors over the past decades has made Israel largely self-sufficient in food production, apart from grains and beef. Imports, totalling $96.5 billion in 2020, include raw materials, military equipment, investment goods, rough diamonds, fuels, grain, and consumer goods. Leading exports include machinery, equipment, software, cut diamonds, agricultural products, chemicals, textiles, and apparel; in 2020, exports reached $114 billion. The Bank of Israel holds $201 billion of foreign-exchange reserves, the 17th highest in the world. Since the 1970s, Israel has received military aid from the United States, as well as loan guarantees, which account for roughly half of Israel's external debt. Israel has one of the lowest external debts in the developed world, and is a lender in terms of net external debt (assets vs. liabilities abroad), which in 2015 stood at a surplus of $69 billion.

Israel has the second-largest number of startup companies after the United States and the third-largest number of NASDAQ-listed companies. It is the world leader for number of start-ups per capita and has been dubbed the "Start-Up Nation". Intel and Microsoft built their first overseas research and development facilities in Israel.

The days which are allocated to working times are Sunday through Thursday (for a five-day workweek), or Friday (for a six-day workweek). In observance of Shabbat, in places where Friday is a work day and the majority of population is Jewish, Friday is a "short day". Several proposals have been raised to adjust the work week with the majority of the world.

=== Science and technology ===
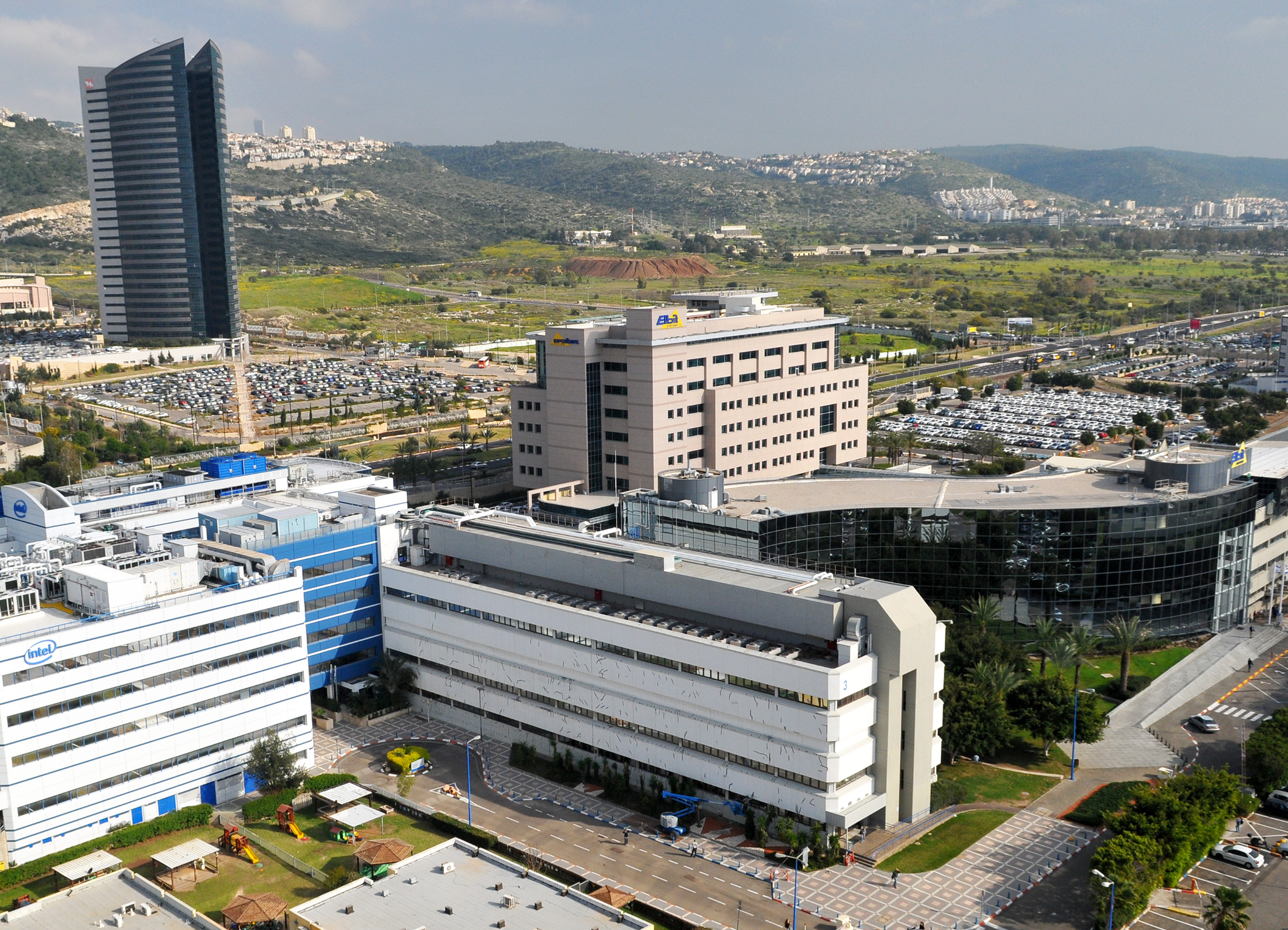
Matam high-tech park in Haifa

Israel's development of cutting-edge technologies in software, communications and the life sciences have evoked comparisons with Silicon Valley. Israel is first in the world in expenditure on research and development as a percentage of GDP. It was ranked 14th in the Global Innovation Index in 2025. Israel has 140 scientists, technicians, and engineers per 10,000 employees, the highest in the world, produced six Nobel Prize-winning scientists, mostly in chemistry, since 2004 and been frequently ranked as one of the countries with the highest ratios of scientific papers per capita. Israeli universities are ranked among the top 50 world universities in computer science (Technion and Tel Aviv University), mathematics (Hebrew University of Jerusalem) and chemistry (Weizmann Institute of Science).

In 2012, Israel was ranked ninth in the world by the Futron's Space Competitiveness Index. The Israel Space Agency coordinates space research programmes with scientific and commercial goals, and has designed and built at least 13 commercial, research and spy satellites. Some satellites are ranked among the world's most advanced space systems. Shavit is a space launch vehicle produced to launch small satellites into low Earth orbit. It was first launched in 1988, making Israel the eighth nation to have space launch capability. In 2003, Ilan Ramon became Israel's first astronaut, serving on the fatal mission of Space Shuttle Columbia.

The ongoing water shortage has spurred innovation in water conservation, and agricultural modernisation; drip irrigation, was invented in Israel. Israel is at the technological forefront of desalination and water recycling. The Sorek desalination plant is the world's largest seawater reverse osmosis desalination facility. By 2014, desalination programmes provided roughly 35% of drinking water, and it is expected to supply 70% by 2050. As of 2023, seawater desalination supplied 80 per cent of Israel's drinking water, while 90 per cent of wastewater was reused for agricultural irrigation. Israel exports technologies for desalination, wastewater treatment, irrigation and water management. In 2021, Israel signed an agreement to sell Jordan an additional 50 million cubic metres of water annually, doubling its existing supply.

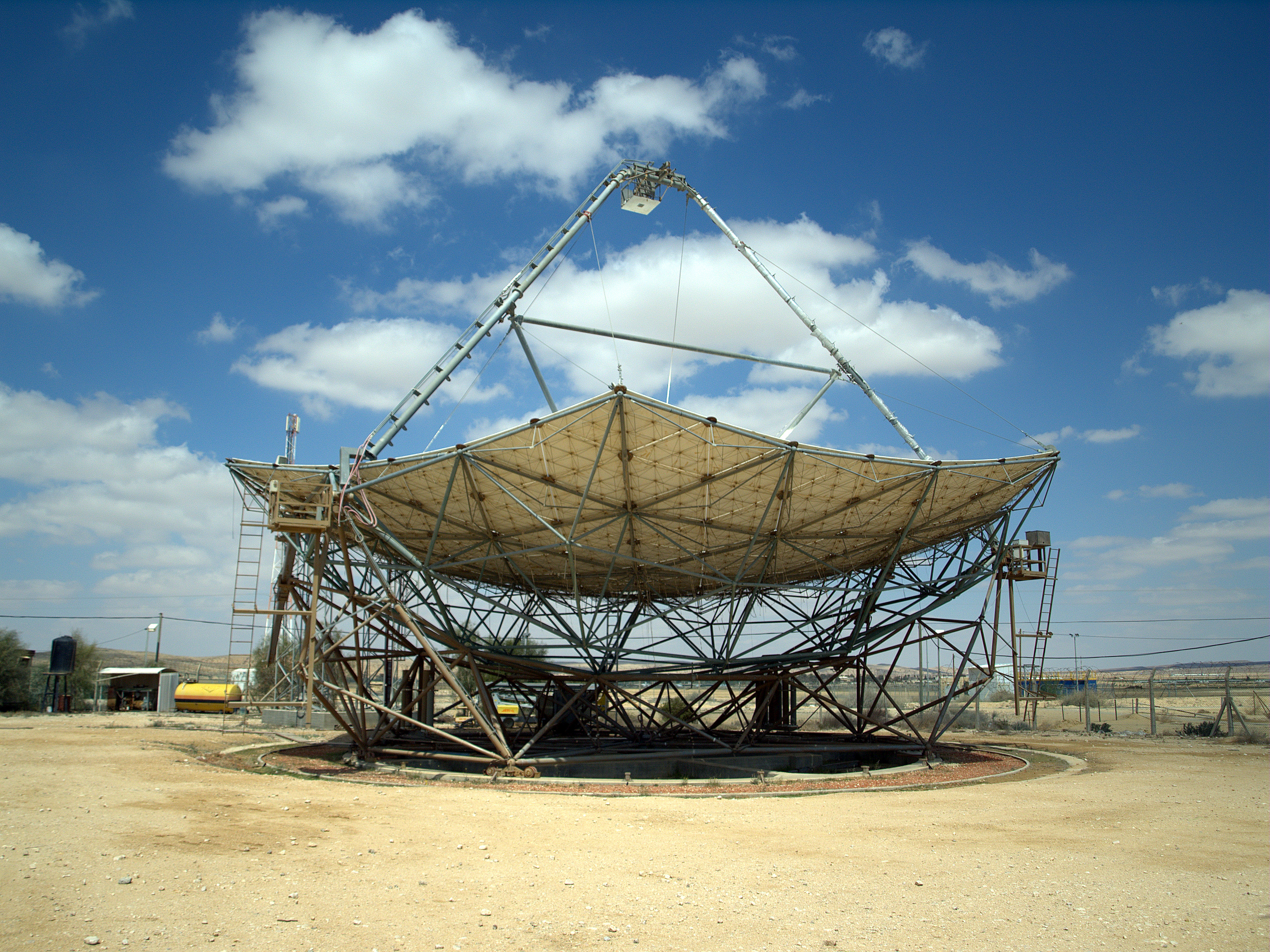
The world's largest solar parabolic dish at the Ben-Gurion National Solar Energy Center

Israel has embraced solar energy, with research focusing on grid integration, energy storage and agrivoltaics. In 2025, renewable sources supplied 16 per cent of electricity consumption, predominantly from solar photovoltaics. Over 90% of homes use solar energy for hot water, the highest per capita. The country saves 8% of its electricity consumption per year because of its solar energy use in heating. The high annual incident solar irradiance at its latitude creates ideal conditions for an internationally renowned solar research and development industry in the Negev. Israel has modern electric car infrastructure involving a countrywide network of charging stations.

=== Energy ===
Israel began producing natural gas from its own offshore gas fields in 2004. In 2009 Tamar gas field was discovered near the coast, and Leviathan gas field was discovered in 2010. The natural gas reserves in these two fields could make Israel energy-secure for more than 50 years. Commercial production of natural gas from the Tamar field began in 2013, with over 7.5 billion cubic metres (bcm) produced annually. Israel had 199 billion bcm of proven reserves of natural gas as of 2016. The Leviathan gas field started production in 2019.

Ketura Sun is Israel's first commercial solar field. Built in 2011 by the Arava Power Company, the field will produce about 9 gigawatt-hours (32 TJ) of electricity per year, sparing the production of some 125,000 tonnes (123,000 long tons; 138,000 short tons) of carbon dioxide over 20 years.

=== Transport ===
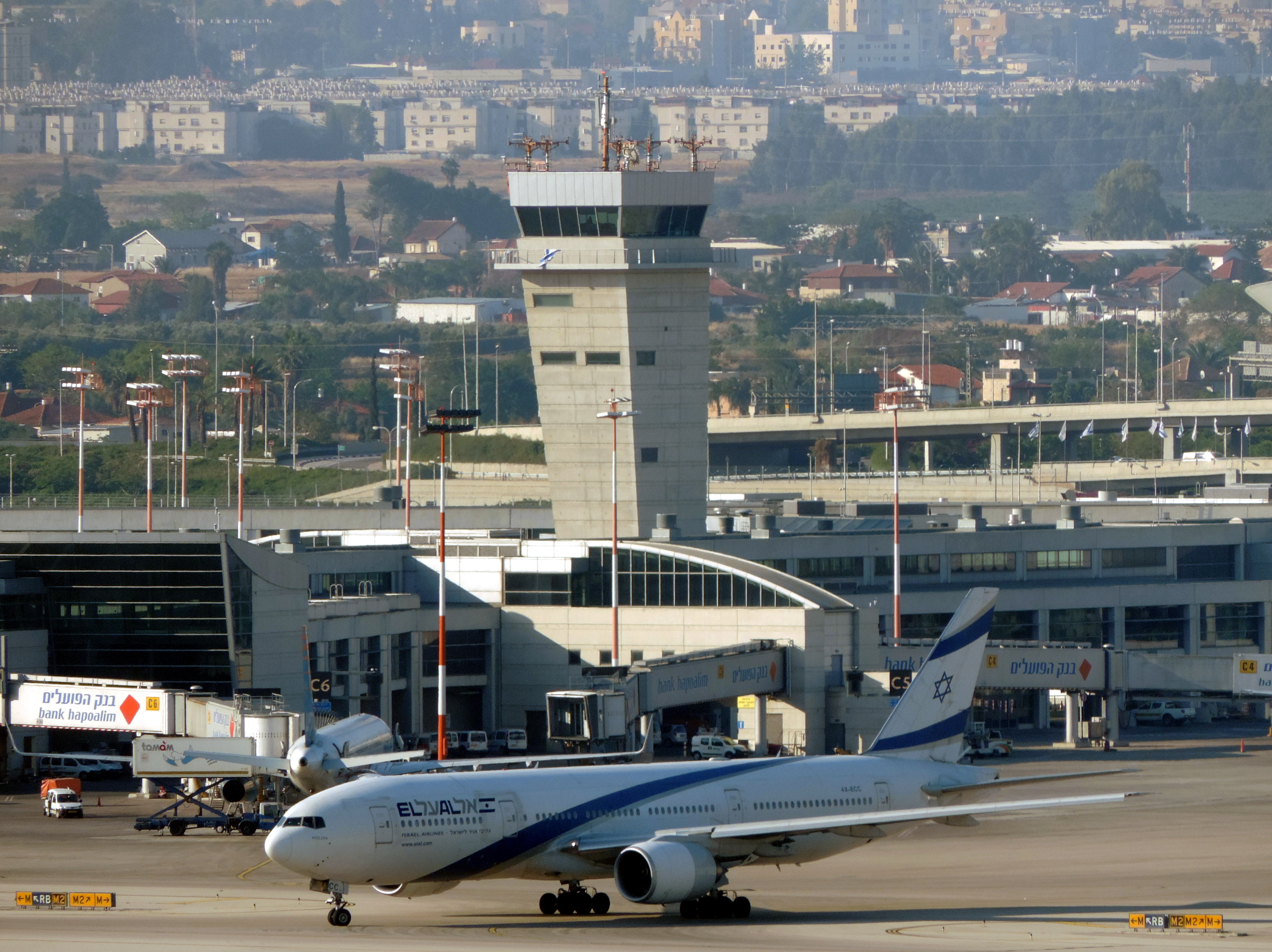
Ben Gurion International Airport, the main international airport of Israel

As of 2016, Israel has 19,224 kilometres (11,945 mi) of paved roads and 3 million motor vehicles. The number of motor vehicles per 1,000 persons is 365, relatively low among developed countries. The country aims to have 30% of vehicles on its roads powered by electricity by 2030.

Israel has 5,715 buses on scheduled routes, operated by several carriers, the largest and oldest of which is Egged, serving most of the country. Railways stretch across 1,277 kilometres (793 mi) and are operated by government-owned Israel Railways. Following major investments beginning in the early to mid-1990s, the number of train passengers per year has grown from 2.5 million in 1990, to 53 million in 2015; railways transport 7.5 million tonnes (8.3 million short tons; 7.4 million long tons) of cargo per year.

Israel is served by three international airports: Ben Gurion Airport, the country's main hub for international air travel; Ramon Airport; and Haifa Airport. Ben Gurion handled over 21.1 million passengers in 2023. There are three main ports: the Port of Haifa, the oldest and largest; Ashdod Port; and the Port of Eilat on the Red Sea.

=== Tourism ===
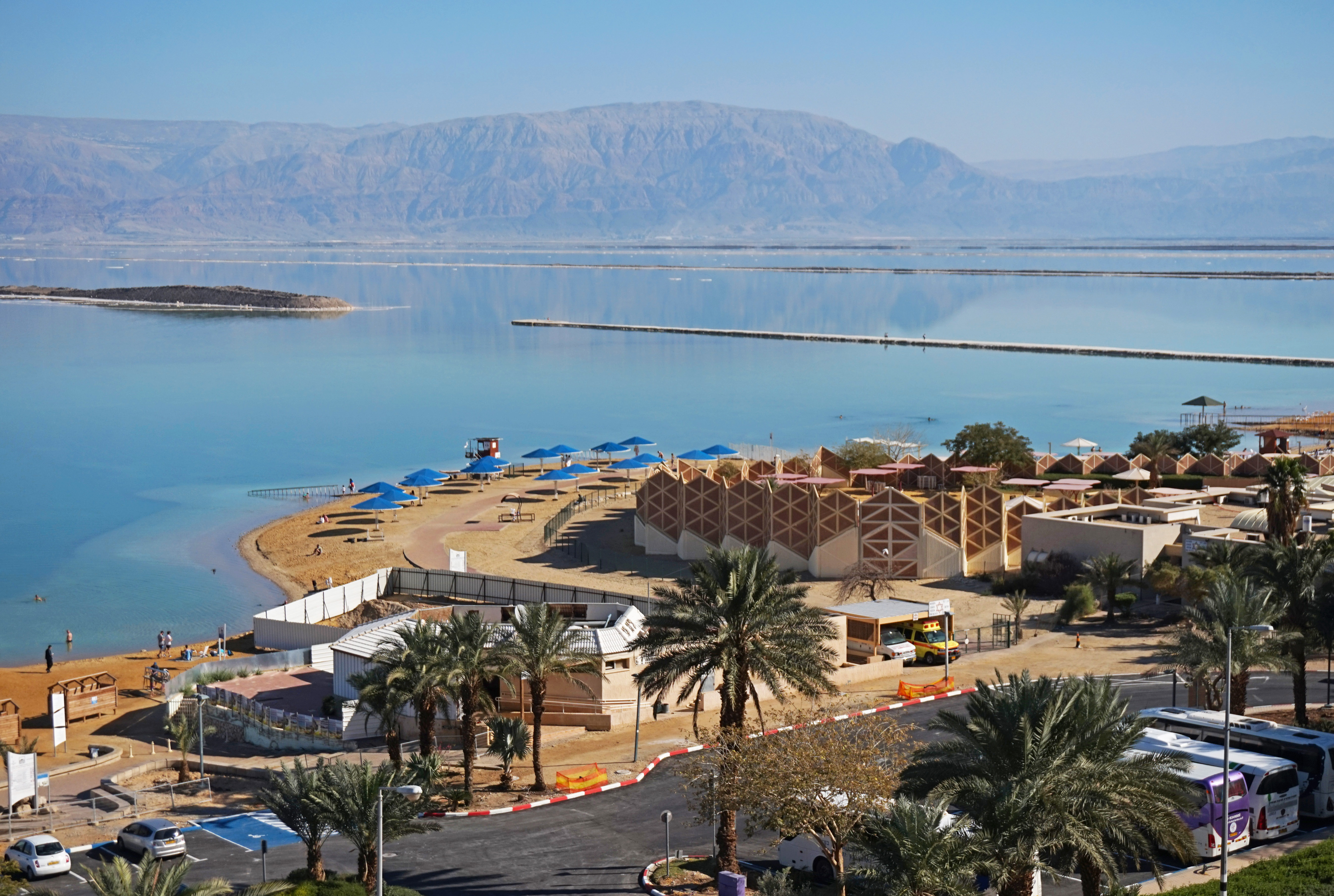
Ein Bokek resort on the shore of the Dead Sea

Tourism, especially religious tourism, is an important industry, with beaches, archaeological, other historical and biblical sites, and unique geography also drawing tourists. In 2017, a record 3.6 million tourists visited Israel, yielding a 25 per cent growth since 2016 and contributed NIS 20 billion to the economy.

=== Real estate ===
Housing prices are listed in the top third of all countries, with an average of 150 salaries required to buy an apartment. As of 2022, there are about 2.7 million properties in Israel, with an annual increase of over 50,000. However, demand for housing exceeds supply, with a shortage of about 200,000 apartments as of 2021. As a result, by 2021 housing prices rose by 5.6%. In 2021, Israelis took a record of NIS 116.1 billion in mortgages, an increase of 50% from 2020.

== Demographics ==
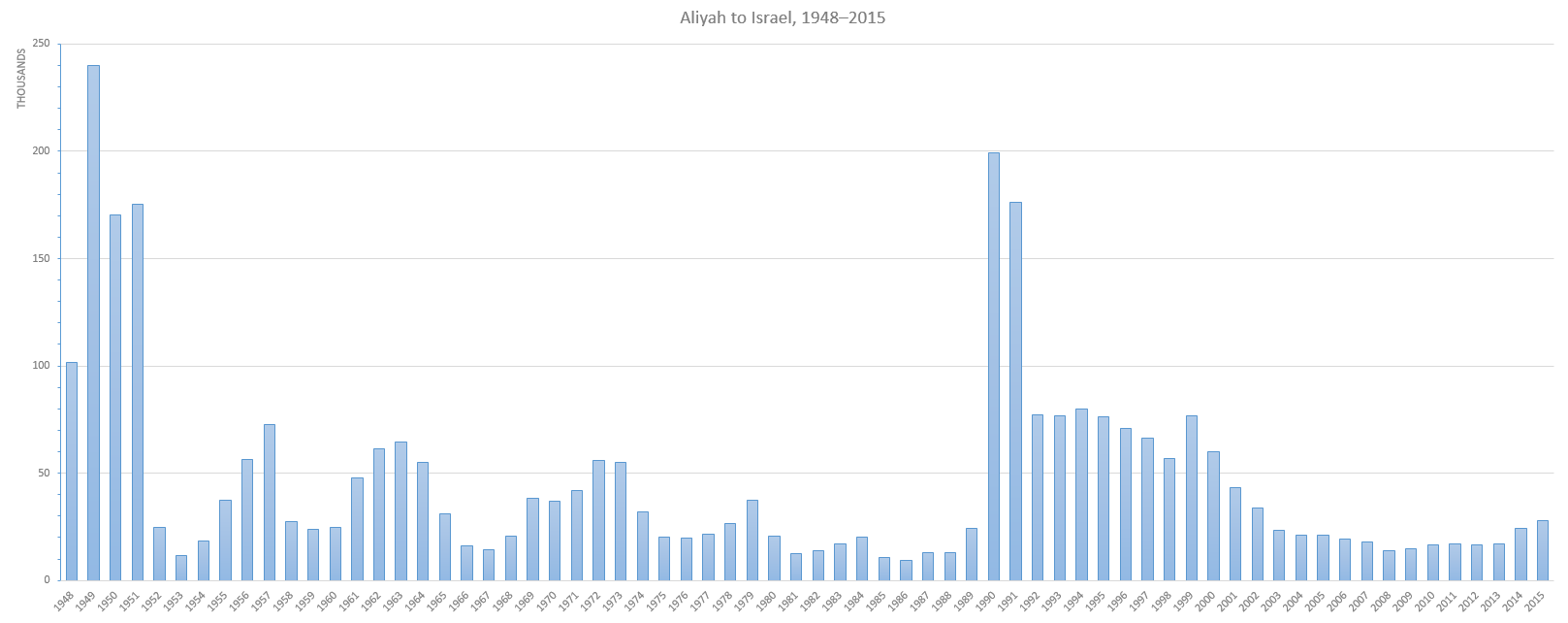
Aliyah in the years 1948–2015. The two peaks were in 1949 and 1990.

Israel has the largest Jewish population in the world and is the only country where Jews are the majority. As of April 2025, the population was an estimated 10,094,000. In 2025, the government recorded 72% of the population as Jews, 21% as Arabs, and 7% as "Others" (non-Arab Christians and people who have no religion listed). Over the last decade, large numbers of migrant workers from Romania, Thailand, China, Africa, and South America have settled in Israel. Exact figures are unknown, as many of them are living in the country illegally, but estimates run from 166,000 to 203,000. By June 2012, approximately 60,000 African migrants had entered Israel.

About 93% of Israelis live in urban areas. 90% of Palestinian Israelis reside in 139 densely populated towns and villages concentrated in the Galilee, Triangle and Negev regions, with the remaining 10% in mixed cities and neighbourhoods. The OECD in 2016 estimated the average life expectancy at 82.5 years, the 6th-highest in the world. Israeli Arab life expectancy lags by 3 to 4 years and is higher than in most Arab and Muslim countries. The country has the highest fertility rate in the OECD and the only one which is above the replacement figure of 2.1. Retention of Israel's population since 1948 is about even or greater, when compared to other countries with mass immigration. Jewish emigration from Israel (called yerida), primarily to the United States and Canada, is described by demographers as modest, but is often cited by Israeli government ministries as a major threat to Israel's future.

Approximately 80% of Israeli Jews are born in Israel, 14% are immigrants from Europe and the Americas, and 6% are immigrants from Asia and Africa. Jews from Europe and the former Soviet Union and their descendants born in Israel, including Ashkenazi Jews, constitute approximately 44% of Jewish Israelis. Jews from Arab and Muslim countries and their descendants, including both Mizrahi and Sephardi Jews, form most of the rest of the Jewish population. Jewish intermarriage rates run at over 35% and recent studies suggest that the percentage of Israelis descended from both Sephardi and Ashkenazi Jews increases by 0.5 per cent yearly, with over 25% of schoolchildren now originating from both. Around 4% of Israelis (300,000), ethnically defined as "others", are Russian descendants of Jewish origin or family who are not Jewish according to rabbinical law, but were eligible for citizenship under the Law of Return.

Israeli settlers beyond the Green Line number over 600,000 (≈10% of the Jewish Israeli population). In 2016, 399,300 Israelis lived in West Bank settlements, including those that predated the establishment of the State of Israel and which were re-established after the Six-Day War. Additionally there were more than 200,000 Jews living in East Jerusalem and 22,000 in the Golan Heights. Approximately 7,800 Israelis lived in settlements in the Gaza Strip, known as Gush Katif, until they were evacuated by the government as part of its 2005 disengagement plan.

Israeli Arabs (including the Arab population of East Jerusalem and the Golan Heights) comprise 21.1% of the population or 1,995,000 people. In a 2017 poll, 40% of Arab citizens of Israel identified as "Arab in Israel" or "Arab citizen of Israel", 15% identified as "Palestinian", 8.9% as "Palestinian in Israel" or "Palestinian citizen of Israel", and 8.7% as "Arab"; the same poll found that 60% of Israeli Arabs have a positive view of the state.

=== Major urban areas ===
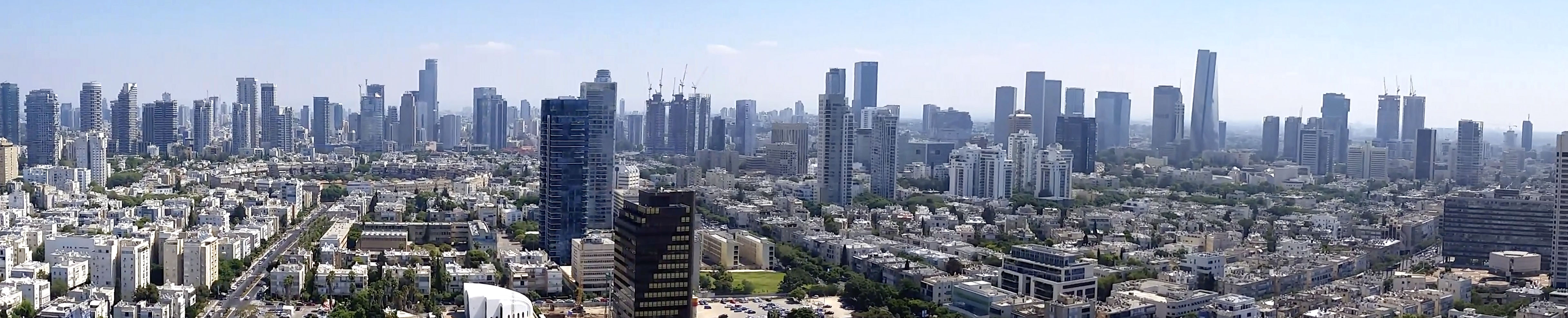
View over the Tel Aviv Metropolitan Area

Israel cities

Israel has four major metropolitan areas: Gush Dan (Tel Aviv metropolitan area; population 3,854,000), Jerusalem (population 1,253,900), Haifa (924,400), and Beersheba (377,100). The largest municipality, in population and area, is Jerusalem with 1,050,153 residents in an area of 125 square kilometres (48 sq mi). Statistics on Jerusalem include the population and area of East Jerusalem, the status of which is in international dispute. Tel Aviv and Haifa rank as Israel's next most populous cities, with populations of 494,900 and 297,082, respectively. The (mainly Haredi) city of Bnei Brak is the most densely populated city in Israel and one of the 10 most densely populated cities in the world.

Israel has 16 cities with populations over 100,000. As of 2018 there are 77 localities granted "municipalities" (or "city") status by the Ministry of the Interior, four of which are in the West Bank.

Largest cities in Israel Israel Central Bureau of Statistics
Rank	Name	District	Pop.	Rank	Name	District	Pop.
1	Jerusalem	Jerusalem	1,050,153^{a}	11	Beit Shemesh	Jerusalem	176,786
2	Tel Aviv	Tel Aviv	494,900	12	Ramat Gan	Tel Aviv	172,242
3	Haifa	Haifa	297,082	13	Ashkelon	Southern	166,864
4	Petah Tikva	Central	270,403	14	Rehovot	Central	155,049
5	Rishon LeZion	Central	259,275	15	Bat Yam	Tel Aviv	129,494
6	Netanya	Central	234,813	16	Herzliya	Tel Aviv	110,884
7	Bnei Brak	Tel Aviv	229,996	17	Hadera	Haifa	107,974
8	Ashdod	Southern	228,562	18	Modi'in	Central	100,052
9	Beersheba	Southern	223,587	19	Kfar Saba	Central	99,410
10	Holon	Tel Aviv	191,829	20	Lod	Central	94,189

^a This number includes East Jerusalem and West Bank areas, which had a total population of 617,580 inhabitants in 2023. Israeli sovereignty over East Jerusalem is internationally unrecognized.

=== Language ===
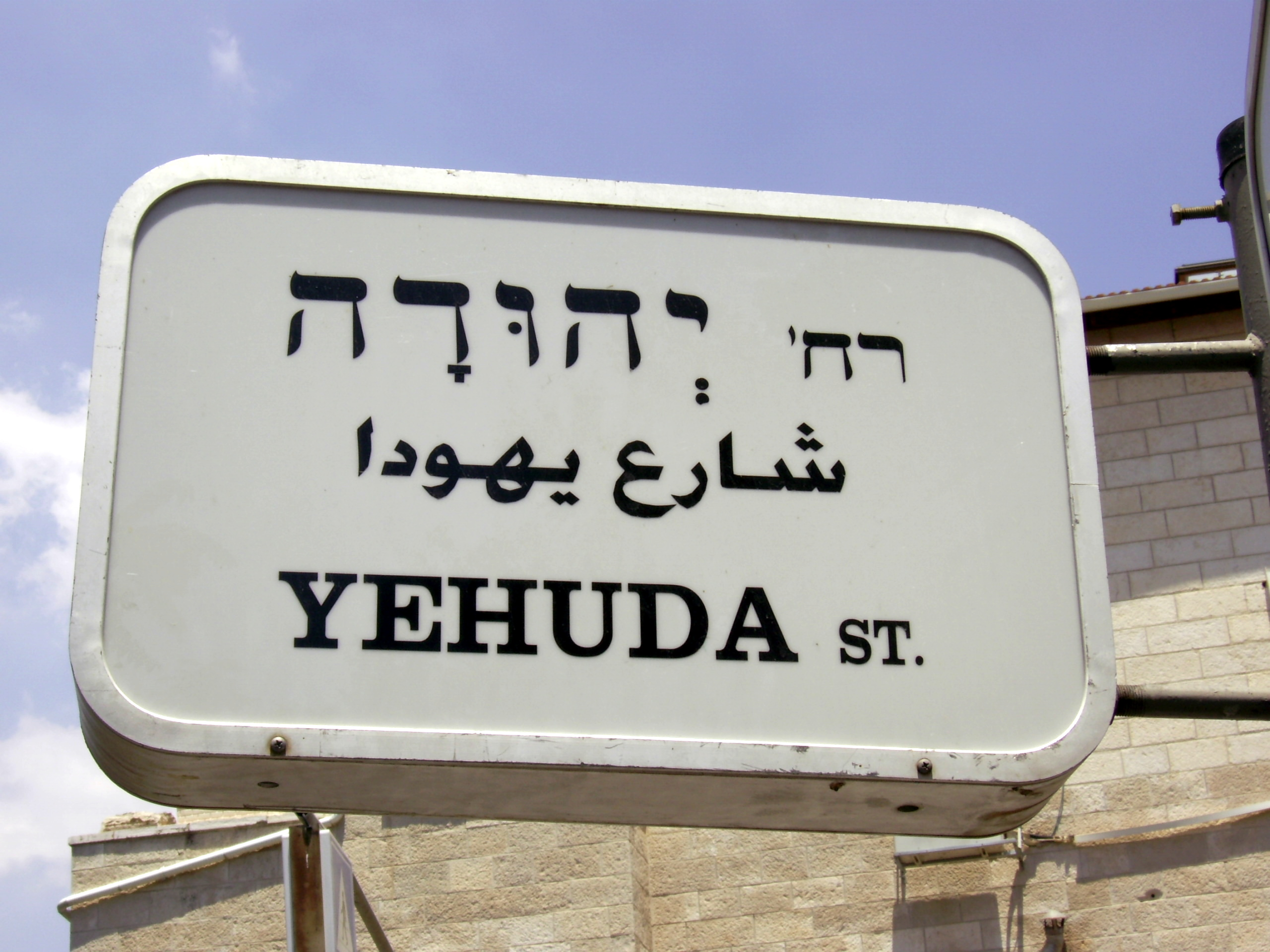
Road sign in Hebrew, Arabic, and English

The official language is Hebrew. Hebrew is the primary language of the state and is spoken daily by the majority of the population. Prior to 1948, opposition to Yiddish, the historical language of the Ashkenazi Jews, was common among supporters of the Zionist movement, including the Yishuv, who sought to promote Hebrew's revival as a unifying national language. These sentiments were reflected in the early policies of the Israeli government, which largely banned Yiddish theatre and publications. Until 2018, Arabic was also an official language; in 2018 it was downgraded to having a "special status in the state". Arabic is spoken by the Arab minority and is the main medium of teaching in Arab schools where Hebrew is studied as a subject. Arabic is studied in most Jewish schools and is often used on signage and in transport announcements.

Due to mass immigration from the former Soviet Union and Ethiopia (some 130,000 Ethiopian Jews live in Israel), Russian and Amharic are widely spoken. Over one million Russian-speaking immigrants arrived in Israel between 1990 and 2004. French is spoken by around 700,000 Israelis, mostly originating from France and North Africa (see Maghrebi Jews). English was an official language during the Mandate period; it lost this status after the establishment of Israel, but retains a role comparable to that of an official language. Many Israelis communicate reasonably well in English, as many television programmes are broadcast in English with subtitles and the language is taught in elementary school. The primary medium of teaching in Israeli universities is Hebrew, but some courses are offered in English.

The main language of the Circassians in Israel is Adyghe, and most of them also know Hebrew and Arabic.

The deaf community in Israel primarily uses Israeli Sign Language. Several village sign languages are used in Israel, most notably the Al-Sayyid Bedouin Sign Language and the Kafr Qasem Sign Language.

=== Religion ===
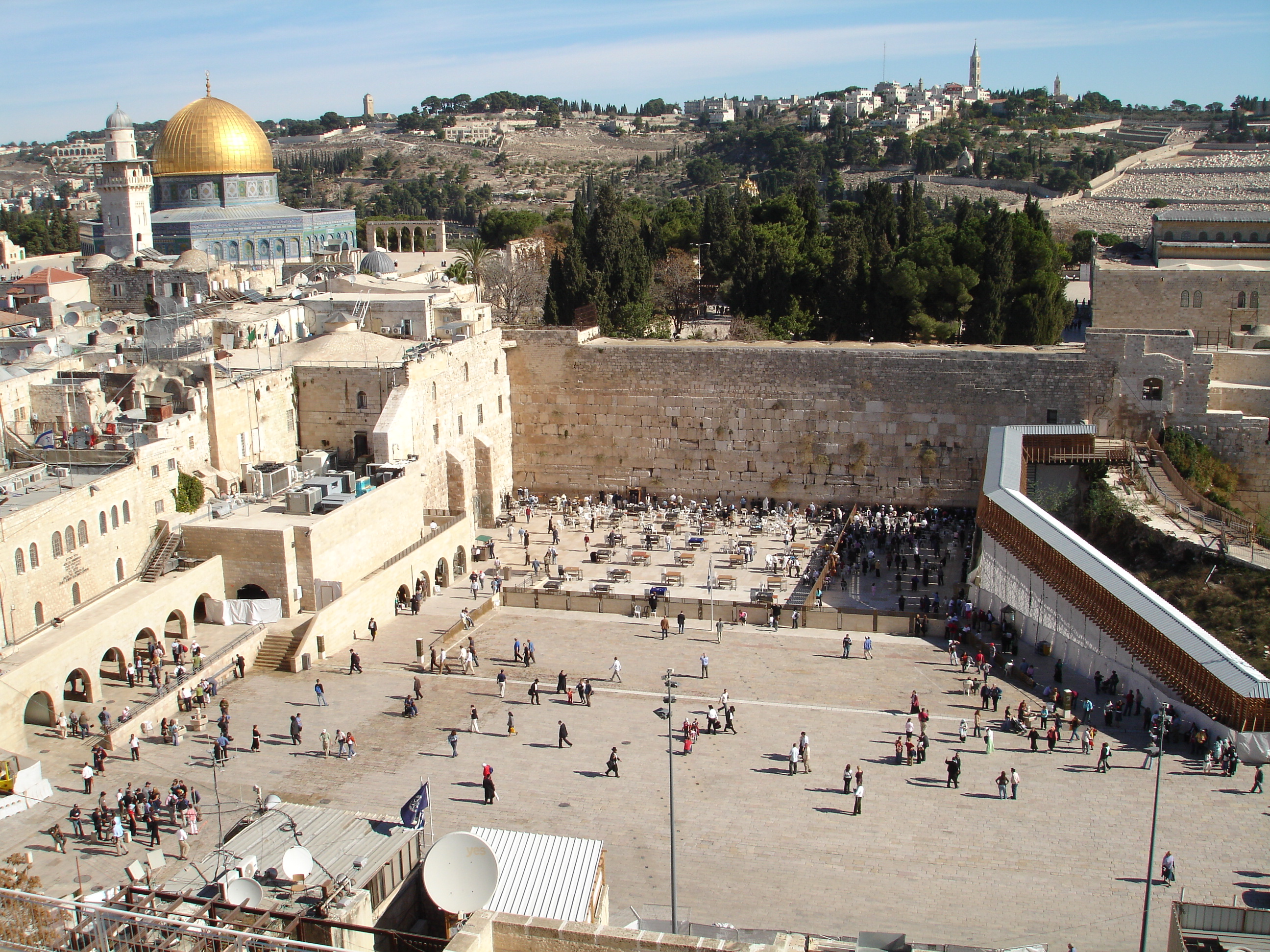
The Dome of the Rock and the Western Wall, Jerusalem

The estimated religious affiliation as of 2022 was 73.5% Jewish, 18.1% Muslim, 1.9% Christian, 1.6% Druze, and 4.9% other. The religious affiliation of Israeli Jews varies widely: a 2016 survey by Pew Research indicates that 49% self-identify as Hiloni (secular), 29% as Masorti (traditional), 13% as Dati (religious) and 9% as Haredi (ultra-Orthodox). Haredi Jews are expected to represent over 20% of the Jewish population by 2028. Muslims constitute the largest religious minority, making up about 18.1% of the population. About 1.9% of the population is Christian, and 1.6% is Druze. The Christian population comprises primarily Arab Christians and Aramean Christians but also includes post-Soviet immigrants, foreign labourers, Armenian Christians, and followers of Messianic Judaism, considered by most Christians and Jews to be a form of Christianity. Members of many other religious groups, including Buddhists and Hindus, maintain a presence in Israel, albeit in small numbers. Out of over one million immigrants from the former Soviet Union, about 300,000 are considered not Jewish by the Chief Rabbinate of Israel.

Israel comprises a major part of the Holy Land, a region of significant importance to all Abrahamic religions. Jerusalem is of special importance to Jews, Muslims, and Christians, as it is the home of sites that are pivotal to their religious beliefs, such as the Old City that incorporates the Western Wall and the Temple Mount (Al-Aqsa Mosque compound) and the Church of the Holy Sepulchre. Other locations of religious importance are Nazareth (site of the Annunciation of Mary), Tiberias and Safed (two of the Four Holy Cities in Judaism), the White Mosque in Ramla (shrine of the prophet Saleh), and the Church of Saint George and Mosque of Al-Khadr, Lod (tomb of Saint George or Al Khidr). A number of other religious landmarks are located in the West Bank, including Joseph's Tomb, the birthplace of Jesus, Rachel's Tomb, and the Cave of the Patriarchs. The administrative center of the Baháʼí Faith and the Shrine of the Báb are located at the Baháʼí World Centre in Haifa; the leader of the faith is buried in Acre. The Mahmood Mosque is affiliated with the reformist Ahmadiyya movement. Kababir, Haifa's mixed neighbourhood of Jews and Ahmadi Arabs, is one of a few of its kind in the country.

=== Education ===
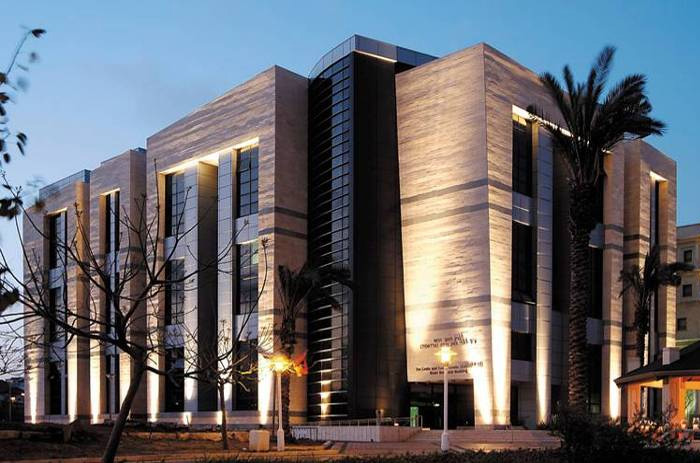
Multidisciplinary Brain Research Center at Bar-Ilan University

In 2015, Israel ranked third among OECD members for the percentage of 25–64-year-olds that have attained tertiary education with 49% compared with the OECD average of 35%. In 2012, the country ranked third in the number of academic degrees per capita (20 per cent of the population).

Israel has a school life expectancy of 16 years and a literacy rate of 97.8%. The State Education Law (1953) established five types of schools: state secular, state religious, ultra orthodox, communal settlement schools, and Arab schools. The public secular is the largest school group and is attended by the majority of Jewish and non-Arab pupils. Most Arabs send their children to Arabic-language schools. Education is compulsory between the ages of three and eighteen. Schooling is divided into three tiers—primary school (grades 1–6), middle school (grades 7–9), and high school (grades 10–12)—culminating with Bagrut matriculation exams. Proficiency in core subjects such as mathematics, the Hebrew language, Hebrew and general literature, the English language, history, Biblical scripture and civics is necessary to receive a Bagrut certificate.

The Jewish population maintains a relatively high level of educational attainment where just under half of all Israeli Jews (46%) hold post-secondary degrees. Israeli Jews 25 and older have an average 11.6 years of schooling, making them one of the most highly educated of all major religious groups in the world. In Arab, Christian and Druze schools, the exam on Biblical studies is replaced by an exam on Muslim, Christian or Druze heritage, respectively. In 2020, 68.7% of 12th graders earned a matriculation certificate.

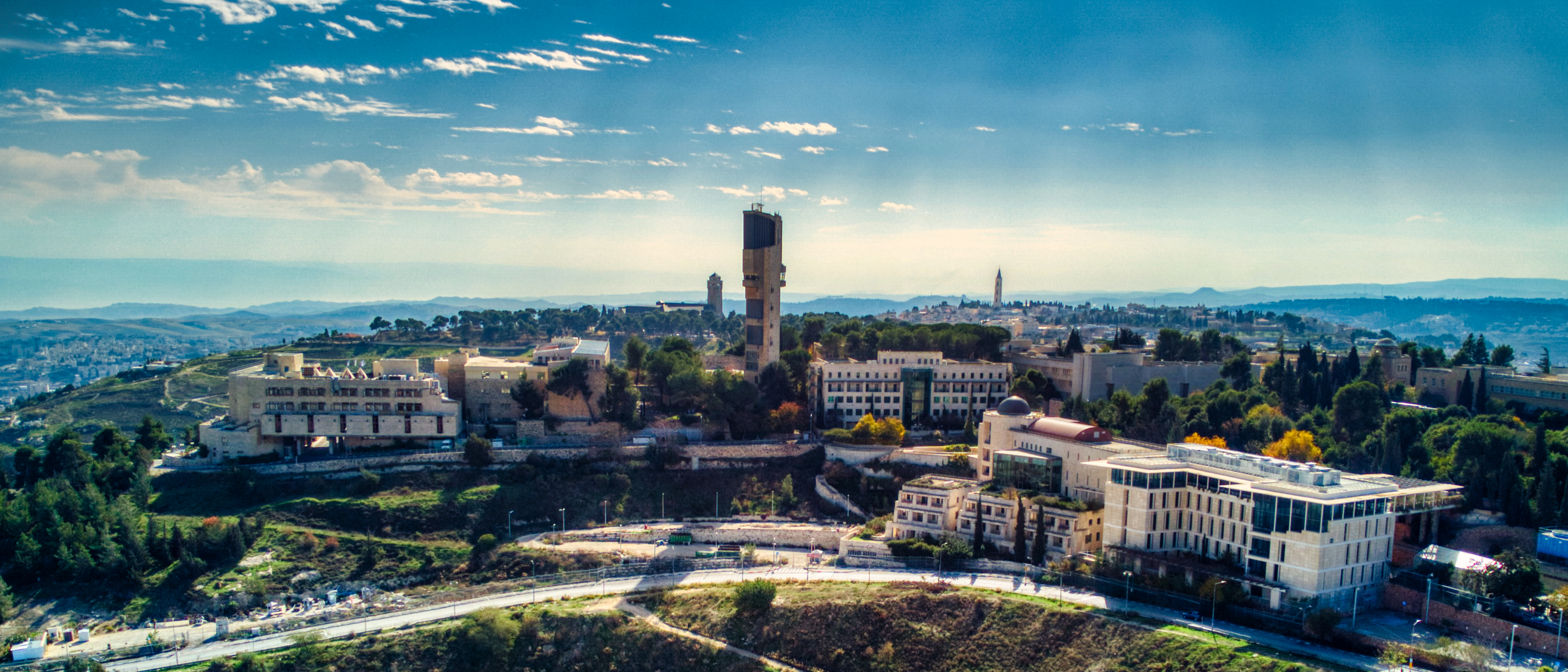
Mount Scopus Campus of the Hebrew University of Jerusalem

Israel has a tradition of higher education where its university education has been largely responsible in spurring modern economic development. Israel has nine public universities subsidised by the state and 49 private colleges. The Hebrew University of Jerusalem houses the National Library of Israel, the world's largest repository of Judaica and Hebraica. The Technion and the Hebrew University consistently ranked among world's 100 top universities by ARWU ranking. Other major universities include the Weizmann Institute of Science, Tel Aviv University, Ben-Gurion University of the Negev, Bar-Ilan University, the University of Haifa, and the Open University of Israel.

=== Health ===
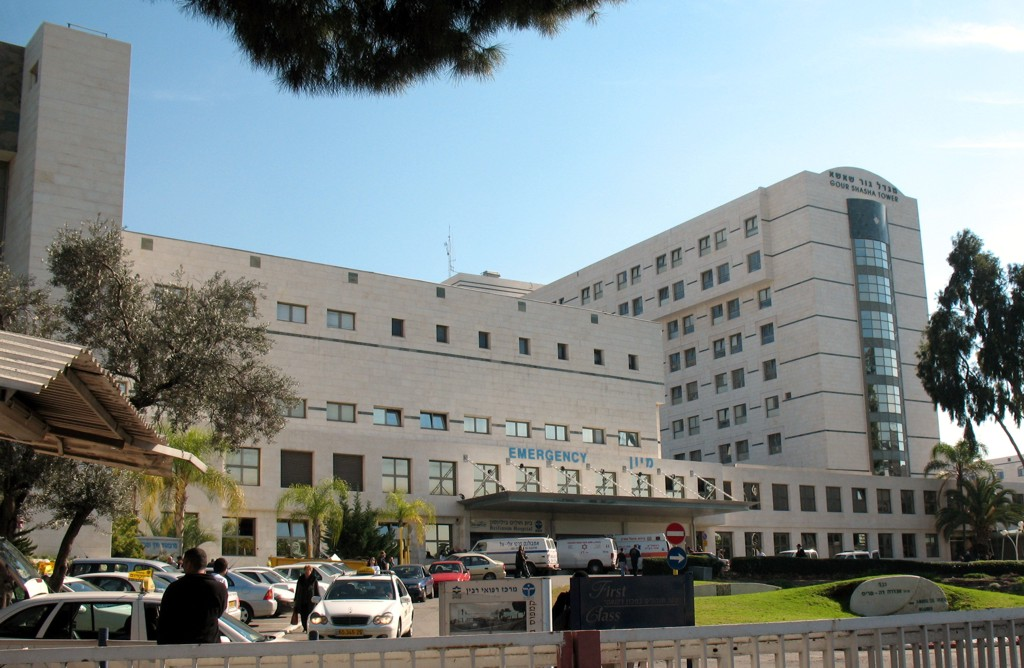
Rabin Medical Center in Petah Tikva, Israel

Health in Israel is advanced and efficient compared to other developed countries; Israel spends 7.3% of their gross domestic product on health compared to 9.3% in the OECD and 18% in the US. With the passing of the 1995 National Healthcare Law, there is mandated universal healthcare for 100% of the population funded by a health tax which is a fixed percentage of income. This health care 'basket' includes a list of services mandated by the Ministry of health. Individuals can purchase coverage for additional services for an extra charge. Despite the cost savings in healthcare, the health status in Israel is satisfactory compared to other countries.

The life expectancy in Israel is 83.8 years, above the OECD average by 2.7 years. Preventable mortality is 78 per 100,000, which is less than the OECD average of 145, whereas treatable mortality is 56 per 100,000, also less than the OECD average of 77. The suicide rate is 4 per 100,000, which is lower than the OECD average of 11. However, 9.1% of Israelis consider their health status bad or very bad, which is higher than the OECD average of 8.0%. Major risk factors include, smoking by 17.0 percent of the population, above the OECD average of 14.8 percent. Alcohol use is less at 2.7 liters per person compared to 8.5 liters. Twenty-eight percent of adults do not get exercise, a little below the 30 percent average. Obesity in Israel is 18 percent, near the OECDs 19 percent.

== Culture ==
Cultural diversity stems from its diverse population: Jews from various diaspora communities brought their cultural and religious traditions with them. Arab influences are found in architecture, music, and cuisine, among others. Israel is the only country where life revolves around the Hebrew calendar, which is aligned to the seasons in the Levant. Public holidays are determined by the Jewish holidays, and except for Yom HaAtzma'ut (Independence Day) there are no annual civil holidays. The official day of rest is Saturday, the Jewish Sabbath.

=== Literature ===
Israeli literature is primarily poetry and prose written in Hebrew, as part of the renaissance of Hebrew as a spoken language since the mid-19th century, although a small body of literature is published in other languages. By law, two copies of all works published in Israel must be deposited in the National Library. In 2016, 89 per cent of the 7,300 books transferred to the library were in Hebrew.

In 1966, Shmuel Yosef Agnon shared the Nobel Prize in Literature with German Jewish author Nelly Sachs. Leading poets include Yehuda Amichai, Nathan Alterman, Leah Goldberg, and Rachel Bluwstein. Internationally famous contemporary novelists include Amos Oz, Etgar Keret and David Grossman.

=== Music and dance ===
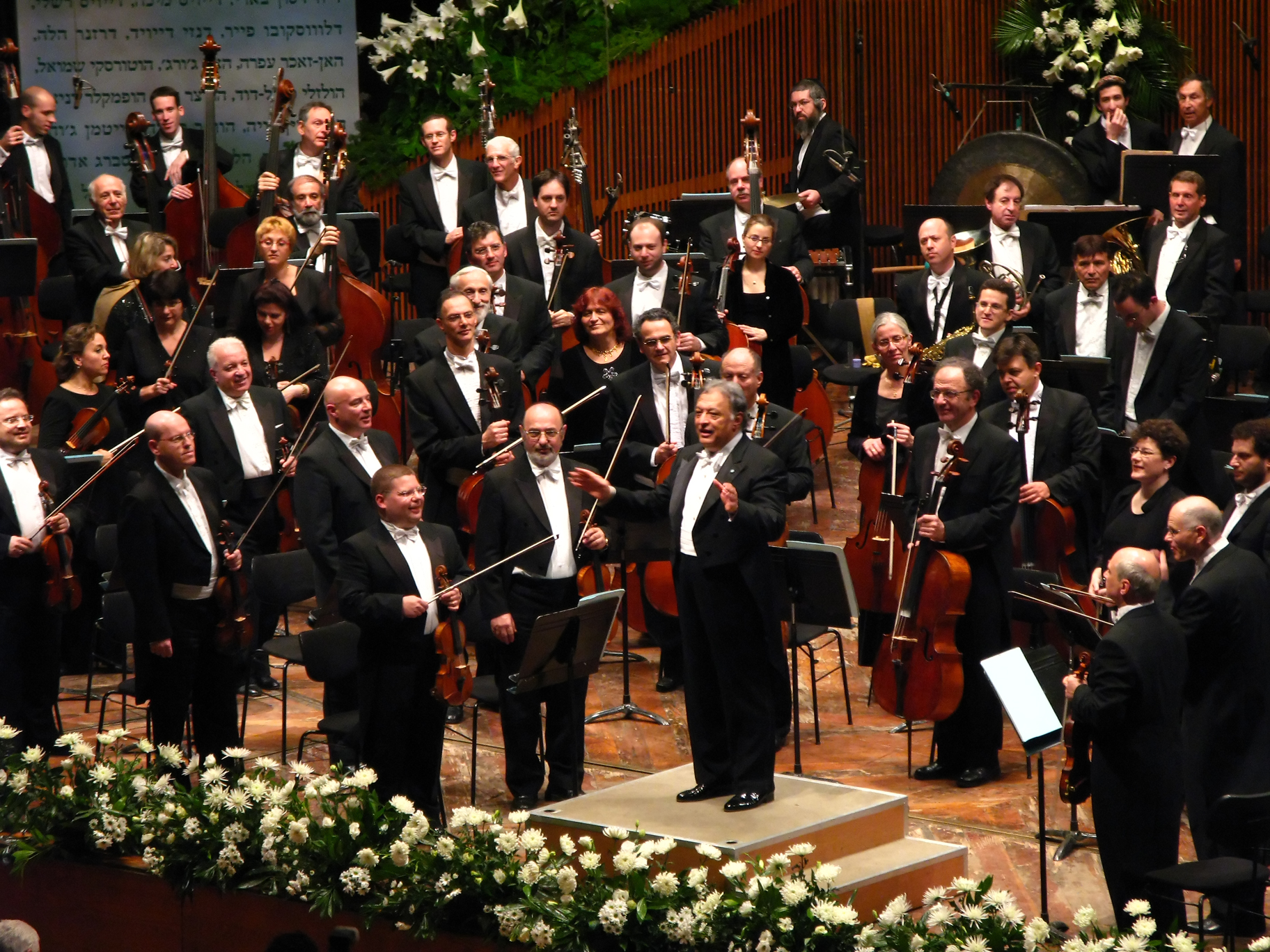
Israel Philharmonic Orchestra conducted by Zubin Mehta

Israeli music includes Mizrahi and Sephardic music, Hasidic melodies, Greek music, jazz, and pop rock. The Israel Philharmonic Orchestra has been in operation for over seventy years and performs more than two hundred concerts each year. Itzhak Perlman, Pinchas Zukerman and Ofra Haza are among the internationally acclaimed musicians born in Israel. The country has participated in the Eurovision Song Contest nearly every year since 1973, winning it four times and hosting three times. Eilat has hosted its own international music festival, the Red Sea Jazz Festival, every summer since 1987. The nation's canonical folk songs are known as "Songs of the Land of Israel".

=== Cinema and theatre ===
Ten Israeli films have been final nominees for Best Foreign Language Film at the Academy Awards.

Continuing the strong theatrical traditions of the Yiddish theatre in Eastern Europe, Israel maintains a vibrant theatre scene. Founded in 1918, Habima Theatre in Tel Aviv is Israel's oldest repertory theatre company and national theatre. Other theatres include Ohel, the Cameri and Gesher.

=== Visual arts ===
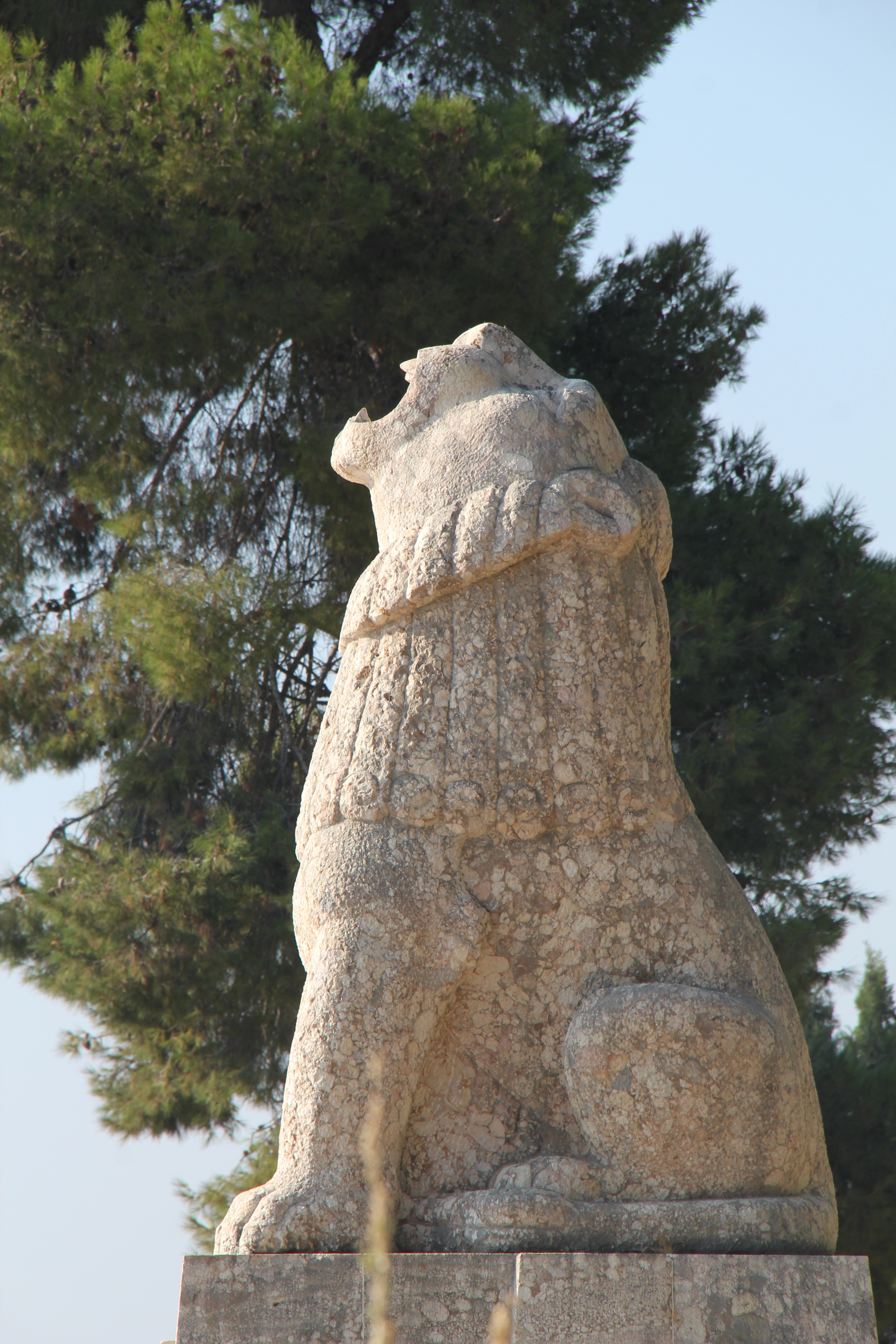
The Roaring Lion sculpture by Avraham Melnikov

Israeli Jewish art has been particularly influenced by the Kabbalah, the Talmud and the Zohar. Another art movement that held a prominent role in the 20th century was the School of Paris. In the late 19th and early 20th century, the Yishuv's art was dominated by art trends emanating Bezalel. Beginning in the 1920s, the local art scene was heavily influenced by modern French art, first introduced by Isaac Frenkel Frenel. Jewish masters of the school of Paris, such as Soutine, Kikoine, Frenkel, Chagall heavily influenced the development of Israeli art. Israeli sculpture took inspiration from modern European sculpture as well Mesopotamian, Assyrian and local art. Avraham Melnikov's The Roaring Lion, David Polus' Alexander Zaid and Ze'ev Ben Zvi's cubist sculpture exemplify some of the different streams in sculpture.

Common themes in art are the mystical cities of Safed and Jerusalem, the bohemian café culture of Tel Aviv, agricultural landscapes, biblical stories and war. Today Israeli art has delved into optical art, AI art, digital art and the use of salt in sculpture.

=== Architecture ===
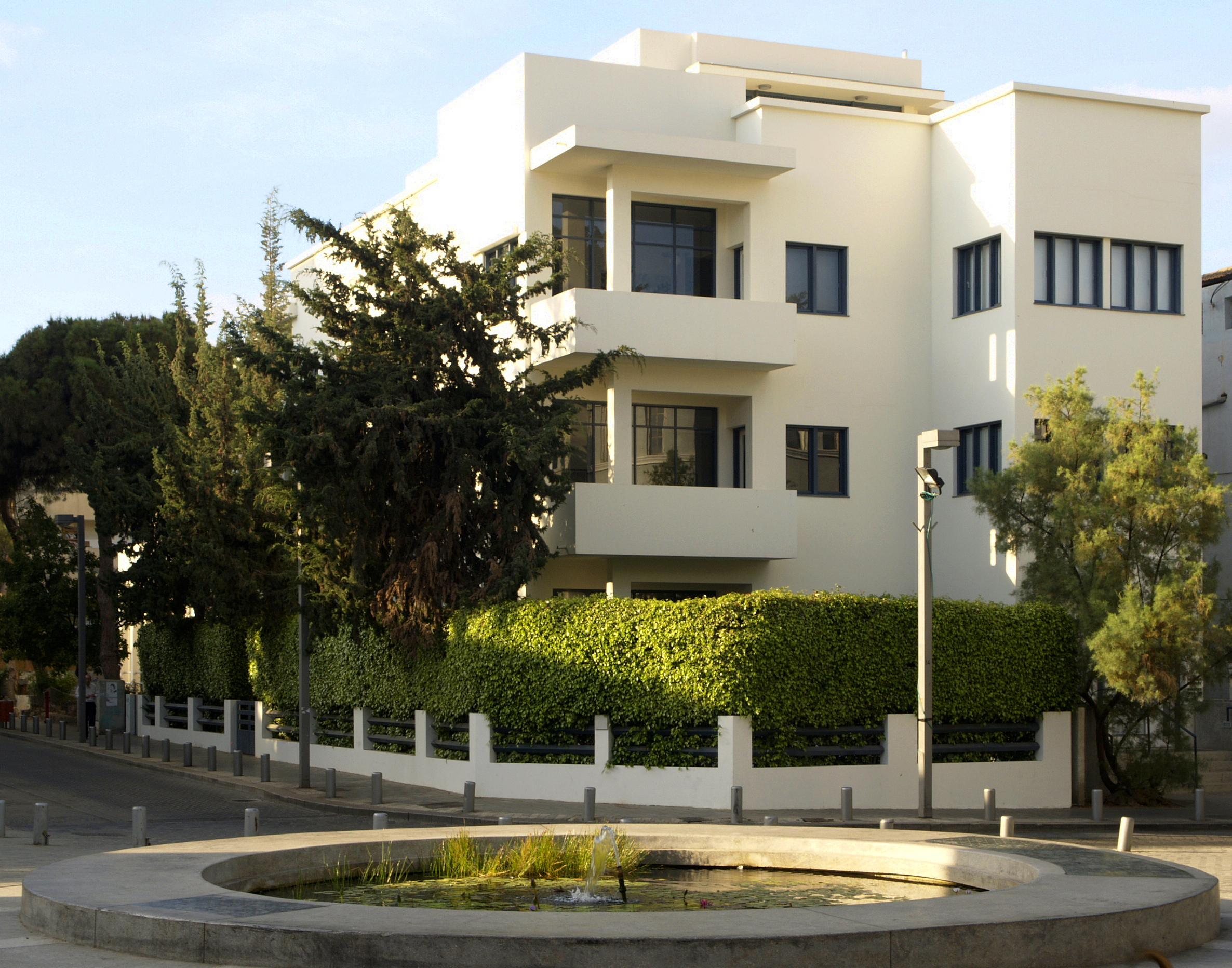
Bauhaus Museum Tel Aviv

Due to the immigration of Jewish architects, architecture has come to reflect different styles. In the early 20th century Jewish architects sought to combine Occidental and Oriental architecture producing buildings that showcase a myriad of infused styles. The eclectic style gave way to the modernist Bauhaus style with the influx of German Jewish architects (among them Erich Mendelsohn) fleeing Nazi persecution. The White City of Tel Aviv is a UNESCO heritage site. Following independence, multiple government projects were commissioned, a grand part built in a brutalist style with heavy emphasis on the use of concrete and acclimatisation to the desert climate. Several novel ideas such as the Garden City were implemented in Israeli cities; the Geddes plan of Tel Aviv became renowned internationally for its revolutionary design and adaptation to the local climate.

=== Museums ===
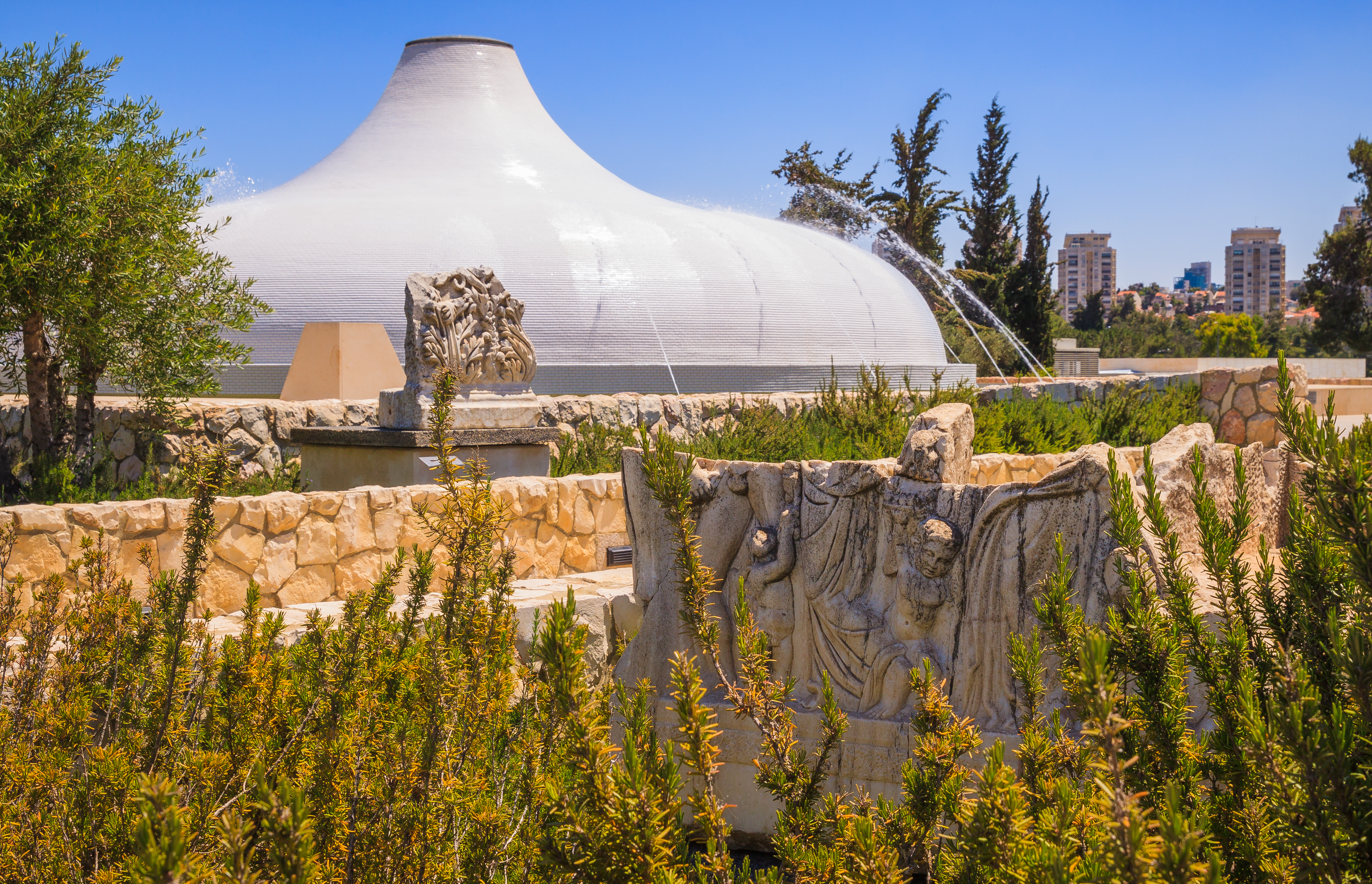
Shrine of the Book, repository of the Dead Sea Scrolls in Jerusalem

The Israel Museum in Jerusalem is one of Israel's most important cultural institutions, and houses the Dead Sea Scrolls, along with an extensive collection of Judaica and European art. Yad Vashem (Hebrew: יָד וַשֵׁם, lit. 'a memorial and a name') is the world's central Holocaust memorial institution and archive of Holocaust-related information. ANU - Museum of the Jewish People is an interactive museum devoted to the history of Jewish communities around the world.

Israel has the highest number of museums per capita. Several museums are devoted to Islamic culture, including the Rockefeller Archaeological Museum and the L. A. Mayer Institute for Islamic Art, both in Jerusalem. The Rockefeller specialises in archaeological remains from Middle East history. It is also the home of the first hominid fossil skull found in West Asia, called Galilee Man.

=== Mass media ===
Notable newspapers include the left-wing Haaretz, centrist Yedioth Ahronoth, and center-right Israel Hayom. There are several major television channels which cater to different audiences, from Russian-language Channel 9 to Arabic-language Kan 33. The 2024 Freedom House report found Israeli media is "vibrant and free to criticise government policy". In the 2024 Press Freedom Index by Reporters Without Borders, Israel was placed 112th of 180 countries, second in the Middle East and North Africa.

Reporters Without Borders reported that the Israel Defence Forces had killed more than 100 Palestinian journalists in Gaza. During the 2023 Gaza war, Israel has been alleged to be "trying to suppress the reporting coming out of the besieged enclave while disinformation infiltrates its own media ecosystem". In May 2024, Israel shut down the local offices of Al Jazeera. In 2024, according to the Committee to Protect Journalists, Israel was the second leading country in jailing journalists, and responsible for the majority of journalists killed in the world.

=== Cuisine ===
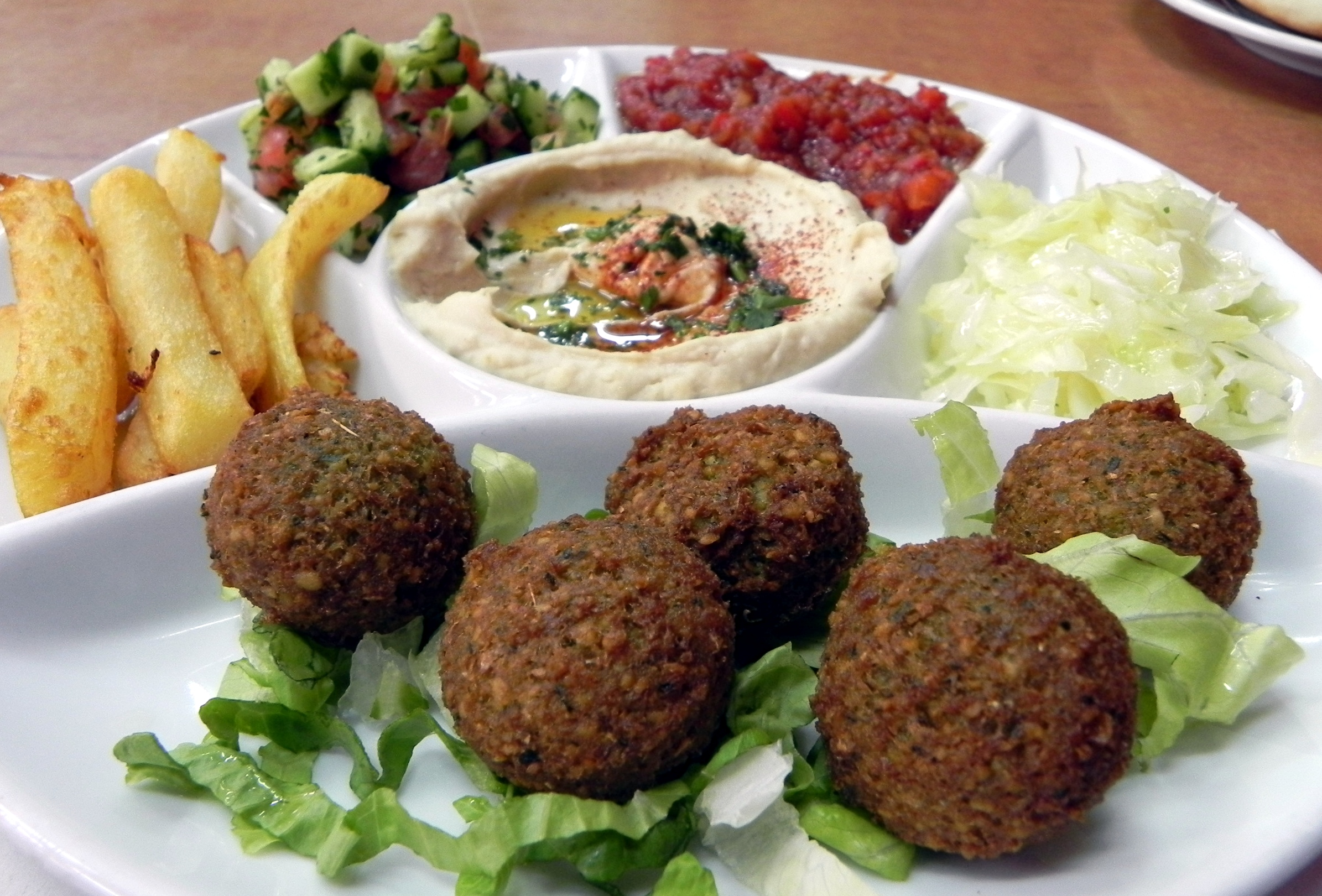
A meal including falafel, hummus, French fries and Israeli salad

Israeli cuisine includes local dishes as well as Jewish cuisine brought to the country by immigrants. Particularly since the late 1970s, a fusion cuisine has developed. The cuisine has adapted elements of the Mizrahi, Sephardi, and Ashkenazi styles of cooking. It incorporates many foods traditionally eaten in the Levantine, Arab, Middle Eastern and Mediterranean cuisines, such as falafel, hummus, shakshouka, couscous, and za'atar. Schnitzel, pizza, hamburgers, French fries, rice and salad are common. Ptitim (Israeli couscous) is a notable Israeli food invented in the 1950s due to rice shortages during the austerity period.

Roughly half of the Jewish population attests to keeping kosher at home. Kosher restaurants make up around a quarter of the total as of 2015. Pork—often called "white meat" in Israel—is produced and consumed despite attempts to ban it; it is forbidden by both Judaism and Islam but is permitted by Christianity and mostly produced in traditionally Christian areas of northern Israel. Other non-kosher foods produced and eaten in Israel include rabbits, ostriches, and non-kosher fish.

=== Sports ===
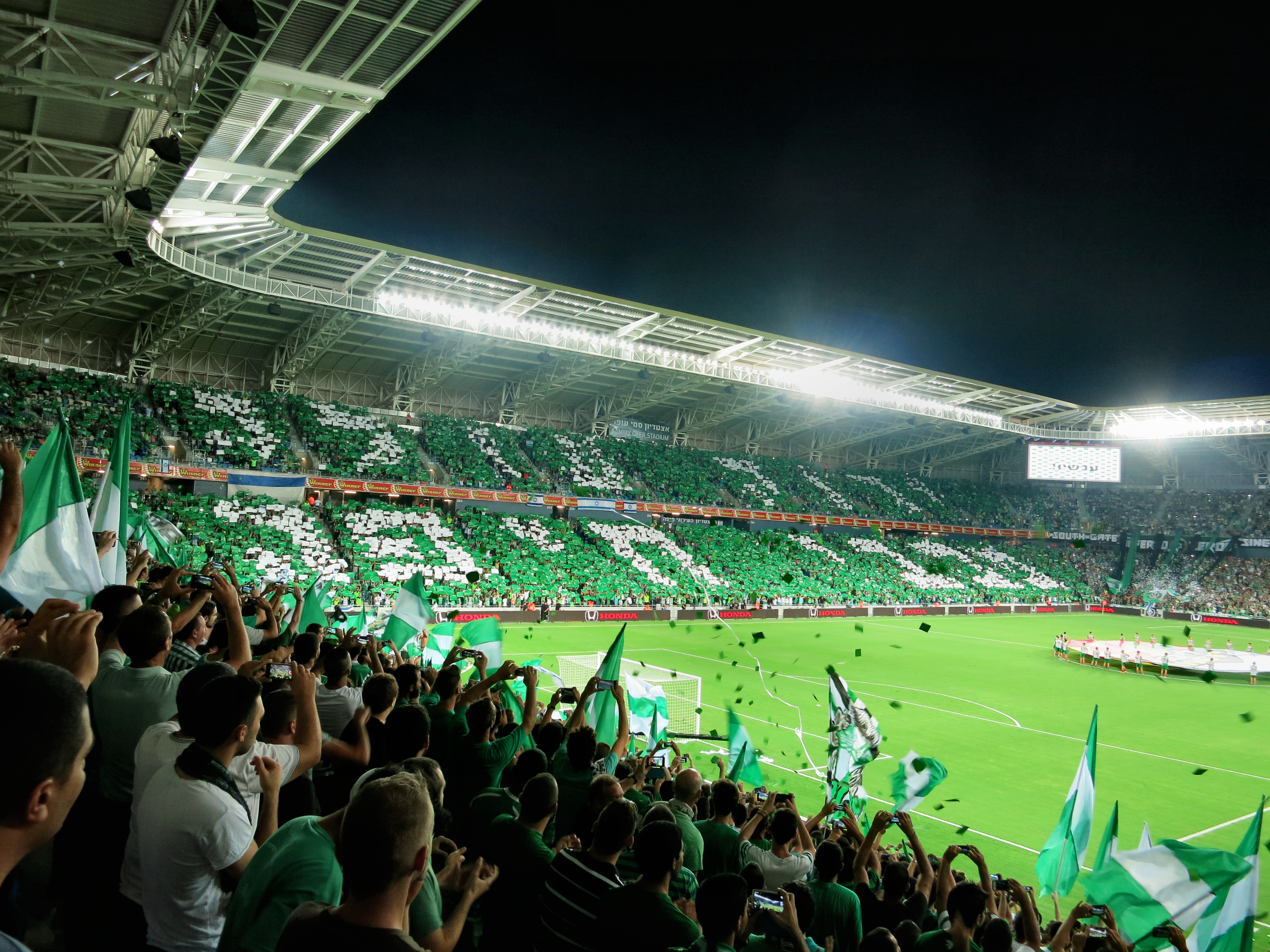
Maccabi Haifa F.C. fans at Sammy Ofer Stadium in the city of Haifa

The most popular spectator sports in Israel are association football and basketball. The Israeli Premier League is the country's premier football league, and the Israeli Basketball Premier League is the premier basketball league. Maccabi Haifa, Maccabi Tel Aviv, Hapoel Tel Aviv and Beitar Jerusalem are the largest football clubs. Maccabi Tel Aviv, Maccabi Haifa and Hapoel Tel Aviv have competed in the UEFA Champions League and Hapoel Tel Aviv reached the UEFA Cup quarter-finals. Israel hosted and won the 1964 AFC Asian Cup; in 1970 the Israel national football team qualified for the FIFA World Cup, the only time it participated. The 1974 Asian Games, held in Tehran, were the last Asian Games in which Israel participated, plagued by Arab countries that refused to compete with Israel. Israel was excluded from the 1978 Asian Games and since then has not competed in Asian sport events. In 1994, UEFA agreed to admit Israel, and its football teams now compete in Europe. Maccabi Tel Aviv B.C. has won the European championship in basketball six times.

Israel has won 20 Olympic medals since its first win in 1992, including a gold medal in windsurfing at the 2004 Summer Olympics, and seven medals at the 2024 Paris Olympics. Israel has won over 100 gold medals in the Paralympic Games and is ranked 20th in the all-time medal count. The 1968 Summer Paralympics were hosted by Israel. The Maccabiah Games, an Olympic-style event for Jewish and Israeli athletes, has been held every four years since the 1930s. Krav Maga, a martial art developed by Jewish ghetto defenders, is used by the Israeli security forces and police.

Chess is a leading sport. There are many Israeli grandmasters and Israeli chess players have won a number of youth world championships. Israel stages an annual international championship and hosted the World Team Chess Championship in 2005.

== See also ==
- Outline of Israel
