= Israeli foreign aid =

Israeli foreign aid relates to the development assistance and humanitarian aid provided by Israel to foreign countries. Israel provides assistance to developing countries to alleviate and solve economic and social problems through its international cooperation program of technical assistance, based on its own recent and ongoing experience in developing human and material resources. Israel's Agency for International Development Cooperation, established as an agency of the Israeli Foreign Ministry in 1958 and known by its Hebrew acronym, MASHAV, is the primary vehicle for providing this aid.

In the 1970s, Israel broadened its aid agenda by granting safe haven to refugees and foreign nationals in distress from around the world. Since the 1980s, Israel has also provided humanitarian aid to places affected by natural disasters and terrorist attacks. In 1995, the Israeli Foreign Ministry and Israel Defense Forces established a permanent humanitarian and emergency aid unit, which has carried out humanitarian operations worldwide. In addition to providing humanitarian supplies, Israel has also sent rescue teams and medical personnel and set up mobile field hospitals in disaster-stricken areas worldwide.

Non-government Israeli humanitarian aid organizations, such as IsraAid (The Israel Forum for International Humanitarian Aid), Fast Israeli Rescue and Search Team (FIRST), Israeli Flying Aid (IFA), ZAKA, Save a Child's Heart (SACH) and Latet (Hebrew for "to give") provide various types of aid in foreign countries, complementing or in coordination with the official government aid. They provide humanitarian aid such as search and rescue teams to disaster zones, life saving aid to people affected by natural or man-made disasters, medical aid, disease prevention, urgent pediatric heart surgery and follow-up care for children from developing countries, and food aid.

Since the inception of its foreign aid programs, the Israel Foreign Ministry reports that as of 2020, Israel has provided international humanitarian aid to over 140 countries or territories, including states with no diplomatic relations with Israel.

== History ==
Israel has provided humanitarian assistance to developing countries in Asia, Africa, South America, Oceania, and Central Europe through the activities of Mashav, the Israeli Center for International Cooperation, created in 1958, with the goal to give developing countries the knowledge, tools, and expertise that Israel gained in its own development, and its ability to "make the desert flourish". This center trains course participants from approximately 140 countries on healthcare, as well as emergency and disaster medicine, and has participated in dozens of projects worldwide in fields economic fields such as agriculture, education, development, employment, and healthcare, as well as humanitarian fields such as disaster relief, reconstruction, and refugee absorption.

Israel's humanitarian efforts officially began in 1957, with the establishment of Mashav, the Israel's Agency for International Development Cooperation.

There are additional Israeli humanitarian and emergency response groups that work with the Israel government, including IsraAid, a joint programme run by 14 Israeli organizations and North American Jewish groups, ZAKA, The Fast Israeli Rescue and Search Team (FIRST), Israeli Flying Aid (IFA), Save a Child's Heart (SACH) and Latet.

In the 1970s, Israel broadened its aid agenda by granting safe haven to refugees and foreign nationals in distress from around the world. Since the 1980s, Israel has also provided humanitarian aid to places affected by natural disasters and terrorist attacks. In 1995, the Israeli Foreign Ministry and Israel Defense Forces established a permanent humanitarian and emergency aid unit, which has carried out humanitarian operations worldwide. As well as providing humanitarian supplies, Israel has also sent rescue teams and medical personnel and set up field hospitals in disaster-stricken areas worldwide.

Between 1985 and 2015, Israel sent 24 delegations of IDF search and rescue unit, the Home Front Command, to 22 countries. In Haiti, immediately following the 2010 earthquake, Israel was the first country to set up a field hospital capable of performing surgical operations. Israel sent over 200 medical doctors and personnel to start treating injured Haitians at the scene. At the conclusion of its humanitarian mission 11 days later, the Israeli delegation had treated more than 1,110 patients, conducted 319 successful surgeries, delivered 16 births and rescued or assisted in the rescue of four individuals. Despite radiation concerns, Israel was one of the first countries to send a medical delegation to Japan following the 2011 earthquake and tsunami disaster. Israel dispatched a medical team to the tsunami-stricken city of Kurihara in 2011. A medical clinic run by an IDF team of some 50 members featured pediatric, surgical, maternity and gynecological, and otolaryngology wards, together with an optometry department, a laboratory, a pharmacy and an intensive care unit. After treating 200 patients in two weeks, the departing emergency team donated its equipment to the Japanese.

After the dual earthquakes in Venezuela in June 2026, Israel provided recovery aid despite the two nations having had no bilateral relations since 2009. At a press conference, Venezuela's interim president Delcy Rodríguez specifically thanked Israel for the specialized aid it had provided. In August 2026, Venezuela announced that it would restore diplomatic ties, with the Israeli assistance provided in response to the pair of earthquakes cited as a key factor behind the resumption of consular relations between the two countries.'

At the request of President Abelardo de la Espriella, Israel sent an 80-person delegation to help with rescue efforts in the aftermath of the magnitude-7.4 earthquake in August 2026, representing one of four nations for which Colombia specifically requested such assistance.

== See also ==
- Foreign relations of Israel
