= Acid Survivors Trust International =

International non-profit organisation

- Founded: 2002
- Type: Non-governmental organisation
- Purpose: To put an end to acid violence and create a world where survivors can live in dignity and without fear.
- Location(s): UK, Bangladesh, Cambodia, India, Uganda, Pakistan and Nepal
- Key people: Jaf Shah (Executive Director); The Princess Royal (Patron)
- Website: acidviolence.org

Acid Survivors Trust International (ASTI) is a UK-based international non-profit organization founded in 2002. It is a registered charity under English law. ASTI works to promote and protect the survivors of acid and burn violence, to end acid violence globally. In addition to public education and awareness campaigns, ASTI has worked with and sustains organizations in Bangladesh, Cambodia, India, Nepal, Pakistan and Uganda.

== Impact ==
The organisation has been involved in multiple campaigns, including those to introduce acid laws in Cambodia, Pakistan and Bangladesh. ASTI is actively involved in administering medical support for survivors. Former ASTI trustee Dr. Ron Hiles OBE has performed over one thousand reconstructive surgery operations and trained hundreds of surgeons, who have treated thousands of patients. In 2016, The Trust Law/Thomson Reuters Foundation shortlisted ASTI for a Solicitors Journal Award for Working in Partnership with J Sagar Associate, Baker & McKenzie and P&G Asia for the comparative law study that looked at acid laws in the UK, India, Cambodia and Colombia (see research).

=== Supporting survivors and changing attitudes ===
ASTI's impact abroad has been primarily centred on providing aid and support to attack survivors, whilst challenging common misconceptions around victimhood. For example, ASTI launched a two-year programme in collaboration with local partners Burns Violence Survivors Nepal and Acid Survivors Foundation Pakistan in the delivery of a British Government Department for International Development funded project.

=== Violence Against Women and Girls (VAWG) ===
Acid violence is considered gender-based violence in many countries, as it affects women disproportionately. The Convention on the Elimination of all forms of Discrimination Against Women (CEDAW) describes gender-based violence as "violence that is directed against a woman because she is a woman or that affects women disproportionately."

Pakistan, India, Bangladesh and Cambodia have all ratified this convention, yet are countries where men against women predominantly perpetrate acid violence.

=== Changing laws ===
Alongside its local partners, ASTI has played a central role in the fight to tackle the root causes of acid violence, ensure proper justice for survivors and prevent further attacks. The following are examples of ASTI's work in changing laws:

- Acid Survivors Foundation Bangladesh, which played a key role in policy change in Bangladesh. Bangladesh was the first country to pass a law banning acid violence in 2002. Fawzia Karim Firoze, a founding trustee of the Acid Survivors Trust, was recognised as an International Woman of Courage in 2024.
- The organisation's local partner, Acid Survivors Foundation Pakistan, campaigned hard and played a critical part in helping to bring about the Acid Control and Acid Crime Prevention Bill in 2011, which has contributed to the decline in attacks. Once known to be the country with the highest number of such attacks (496 recorded attacks in 2002) and the highest incident rates for women, it has since experienced a drastic drop (approx. 70 attacks recorded in 2012) in the frequency of acid assaults.
- ASTI supported the work of the Cambodian Acid Survivors Charity (CASC) in bringing about legal reform. Cambodia has also adopted the Acid Law to criminalize and penalize perpetrators. A year after it was passed in 2012, the country also passed regulations governing the sale and use of concentrated acid.
- With over 100 victims of attack annually, Colombia has strengthened its legislative framework and enacted a law in January 2016 to impose sentences of 12 to 50 years in jail for perpetrators of acid attacks. The law was named after acid attack survivor Natalia Ponce de Leon, who was attacked in 2014 and has since campaigned for stricter laws on acid violence.
- The Colombian government also sought information from ASTI on tackling acid violence. At the Colombian government's invitation, the ASTI executive director visited Colombia twice (2014 and 2015) to provide expert advice.
- Following the sharp increase in acid violence in the UK, the organisation was approached by British Home Office officials, the Shadow Home Secretary, and cross-party MPs seeking advice on tackling the surge in acid attacks. Consequently, they provided policy briefings and a detailed legal memorandum on loopholes in current laws. Further, Amber Rudd announced that the Home Office is to ban the sale of most corrosive substances to under-18s as well as establish a six-month minimum sentence for anyone caught for the second time carrying acid without good reason.

== Media coverage ==
ASTI is often called on for comment whenever an acid attack is reported in the media. ASTI has featured in and provided material for coverage of acid violence in media outlets including the BBC, ITV, Channel 4, CNN, The Independent, The Guardian, and The New York Times.

In October 2023, several media outlets reported on the ASTI investigation showing a sharp rise in the number of attacks in England and Wales.

== Patron ==
- Anne, Princess Royal
