= Anmol Rodriguez =

Indian acid attack survivor (born 1994)

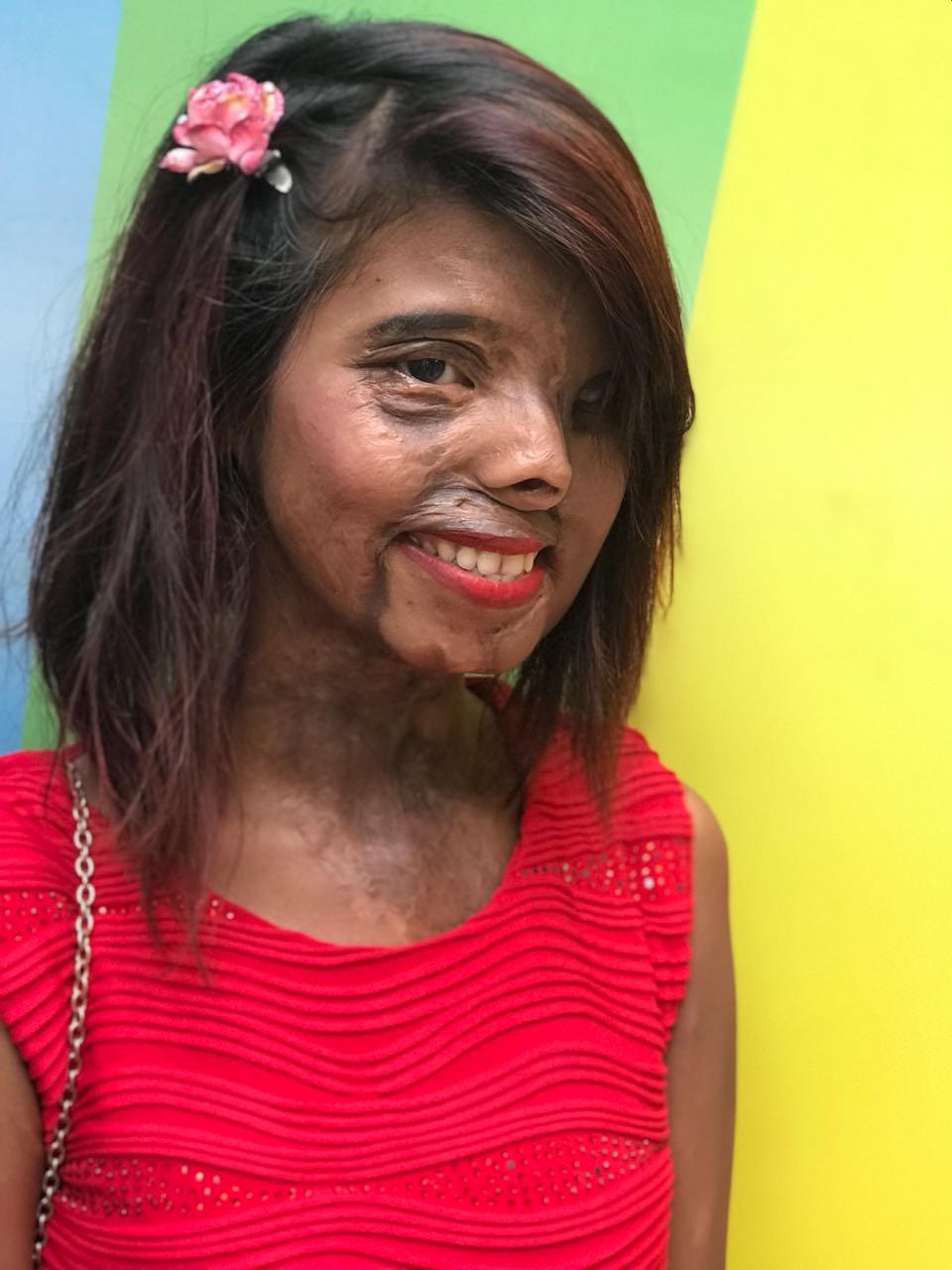
Anmol Roderiguez in 2018

Anmol Rodriguez (born 17 November 1994) is an Indian acid attack survivor.

When Rodriguez was two months old, her father attacked her and her mother with acid, angry that Rodriguez was a girl. The acid attack killed Rodriguez's mother and left her permanently scarred. Her father was arrested, and Rodriguez was abandoned by the remainder of her family. She was saved by a Mumbai-based orphanage, Shree Manav Seva Sangh. Today, Rodriguez works to inspire fellow acid attack survivors, and is a fashion icon to people across the globe.

She started her NGO Sahas Foundation in 2017 to help other acid attack survivors in their rehabilitation. In addition to her charity work, Rodriguez is a fashion influencer and Tedx speaker. "Aunty ji" was her first short film where she has shared screen with Shabana Azmi.

== Others ==
- 1. http://www.assfindia.com/

2. Aunty Ji
