= Acid attacks in the United Kingdom =

Acid attacks in England are a form of interpersonal violence where acid or other corrosive fluids are used with the intention of causing harm. London has been called "the acid attack hotspot of the Western world."

== Prevalence ==
As of 2021, violent corrosive fluid attacks have been on a steep decline in England, particularly in London, while there are no Acid Attacks recorded in Scotland or Wales. In 2012, 78 attacks were reported in London. The number rose rapidly and ultimately peaked at 472 attacks in 2017, before falling to 310 attacks in 2018, 123 attacks in 2019, and ultimately just 74 in 2021. Such attacks normally target young men and moped drivers.

== Substances ==
Corrosive fluids can include actual acids, such as sulfuric acid and hydrochloric acid, but also alkaline substances, such as ammonia and bleach.

== Restrictions on sale ==
The sale of corrosives to under-18s has been prohibited by the Offensive Weapons Act 2019. Some strong corrosives are also covered by the requirement for an explosives precursors and poisons licence for a number of chemical compounds under the Control of Poisons and Explosives Precursors Regulations 2023.

== Notable incidents ==
=== 2008 ===
==== Katie Piper ====
On 31 March 2008, Katie Piper was attacked with sulphuric acid, causing major damage to her face and blindness in one eye. Piper was attacked by Stefan Sylvestre, an accomplice of her ex-boyfriend, Daniel Lynch, who two days before raped and beat Piper, threatened to cut her with a razor and hang her, and stabbed her several times in the arms. Lynch had persuaded Piper to go to an internet cafe to read an email he had sent to her Facebook account. Luring Piper to this location was a ruse, as he had given her details to Stefan Sylvestre, who identified her on Golders Green Road. Wearing a hoodie to obscure his identity, Sylvestre approached Piper, who thought he was going to ask for money, and then threw acid at her face.

Lynch received two life sentences and will serve a minimum of 16 years. Sylvestre received a life sentence and was told he would serve a minimum of 6 years. Sylvestre's parole application for release was approved in 2018. In 2022, it was reported that Sylvestre had breached the terms of his parole on numerous occasions; he is now being hunted by police after going on the run and allegedly fleeing the UK that August.

Piper underwent pioneering surgery to restore her face and vision. Piper was initially treated at Chelsea and Westminster Hospital, where her treatment was led by plastic surgeon Mohammad Ali Jawad. The acid, some of which Piper had swallowed, blinded her in her left eye and caused partial thickness and full thickness burns. The surgeons completely removed the skin off Piper's face and replaced it with a skin substitute, Matriderm, to build the foundations for a skin graft. This procedure was the first of its kind to be done in a single operation.

Piper was put into an induced coma for 12 days. She has undergone numerous surgical operations to treat her injuries and has worn a plastic face mask for 23 hours a day, which has flattened the scars and helped retain moisture. As part of her care from the National Health Service, Piper was treated at a clinic in southern France. The treatment she received there was designed to break down scar tissue and prevent skin contraction.

=== 2012 ===
==== Naomi Oni ====
On 30 December 2012, Naomi Oni had acid thrown in her face by her friend Mary Konye, allegedly due to Oni having called her an "ugly monster", having fallen out in April 2011. Wearing a veil, Konye followed Oni home after she left her work at the Westfield shopping centre. Oni lost her hair and eyelashes, requiring skin grafts.

While initially pretending to support Oni, the day after the attack, Konye posted a picture of Nightmare on Elm Street character Freddy Krueger (who had a burnt face), with the message, "Who looks like the Wrong Turn now?".

It was believed that the attack was a copy of that suffered by Katie Piper, with Oni telling the court how Konye was awed by the impact Piper’s attack had had on her, having seen a documentary on television about it.

Konye was later sentenced to 12 years of imprisonment.

=== 2014 ===
==== Andreas Christopheros ====
At approximately 16:00 GMT on 9 December 2014, Andreas Christopheros was attacked with acid on the doorstep of his home address in Truro, Cornwall, by David Phillips, leaving him with severe facial disfigurement, burns to his body and arms, and blindness in one eye, with partial blindness in the other. Phillips was seeking revenge on a person who had sexually assaulted someone close to him and travelled to Carrine Road in Cornwall. However, Phillips turned up at the wrong address and instead arrived at the home of Christopheros. While he was at home with his wife and 18-month-old son, Christopheros opened the door, and Phillips said, "This is for you", before throwing concentrated sulphuric acid at Christopheros. Due to how strong the acid was, Christopheros' shirt disintegrated immediately, and the acid damaged the floor and hallway of his house. Christopheros' wife also suffered burns on her feet after helping her husband. Phillips admitted causing grievous bodily harm with intent and was sentenced to seven years imprisonment. Phillips' wife, Nicole Phillips, had been charged with perverting the course of justice; however, her trial did not go ahead, and the judge ruled the charge was to remain on file.

==== Matthew Williams and Gary Woolgrove ====
On 16 October 2014, a London-based gang, including 22-year-old Reece Watkins, 21-year-old Joe Warne, 20-year-old Dominic Barker, and 19-year-old Piers Fox-Havilland, entered a flat in the Boscombe area of Bournemouth, Dorset, ransacking it in a "drugs-related" crime. Armed with imitation firearms, a knife, and ammonia that was placed within Lucozade bottles, Watkins threw ammonia into Matthew Williams' face, who was visiting the flat, causing blindness in one of his eyes and partial blindness in the other.

At trial in 2015, all four members of the gang were convicted of conspiracy to rob and possession of imitation firearms to commit an indictable offence and sentenced to 12 years imprisonment and 8 years to be served concurrently. Watkins was convicted of throwing a corrosive substance with intent to injure and jailed for a further 14 years, to run concurrently with his other sentences.

Warne was also jailed for 14 years concurrently, having squirted ammonia in the face of Gary Woolgrove on Somerford Road, in the Christchurch area, on 14 November 2014. This occurred after an alleged dispute over a girlfriend. Along with local 22-year-old man Alex Williams, Warne and Watkins were convicted of violent disorder, having chased Woolgrove and thrown ammonia around in the Purewell area of Christchurch.

=== 2015 ===
==== Ambreen Fatima Sheikh ====
Following her arranged marriage to Asgar Sheikh in 2014, Ambreen Fatima Sheikh was brought to the UK from Pakistan in 2015 and lived with her husband and his parents in Huddersfield, West Yorkshire. During 2015, she was "tricked or forced" into taking glimepiride, a drug used to treat diabetes, which induced severe brain injury. She was also doused in a caustic substance, believed to be cleaning fluid, prior to being hospitalised in August 2015, which caused life-limiting injuries. The subsequent trial of her husband and in-laws heard that she was being kept alive by being fed through a tube but would eventually die prematurely as a result of her injuries. Following a trial at Leeds Crown Court in 2023, Asgar Sheikh, his father, Khalid, and mother, Shabnam, and sister Shagufa Sheikh, were all found guilty of allowing a vulnerable adult to suffer physical harm. In February 2024, Asgar Sheikh was sentenced to seven years and nine months in prison, while his relatives also received custodial sentences.

=== 2017 ===
==== 22 people at Mangle E8 nightclub, Dalston, London ====
At approximately 01:00 BST on 17 April 2017, Arthur Collins injured 22 people inside the Mangle E8 nightclub in Dalston, East London, with acid. CCTV showed him getting into a confrontation with a group of men within the nightclub before Collins sprayed acid from a bottle over the crowd. Of the 22 people injured, 16 suffered serious burns. One man required a skin graft after suffering third-degree facial burns, and other people had injuries to their eyes.

Collins was arrested several days later, being tasered when he attempted to flee from officers, jumping from the window of a Northamptonshire house.

Victims of the attack appeared at Collins' trial, telling the jury they could smell burning and how their skin blistered immediately. The liquid was later discovered to have a pH of 1 (equal to strong acids, such as battery acid). At his trial, Collins explained that he grabbed the bottle "from the back pocket of an unidentified man", thinking it was a date rape drug. A week before the attack, Collins texted his sister, telling her to "[t]ell mum to mind that little hand wash in my car", ending the text with the word "acid". Collins stated that this was in reference to a hair-thickening shampoo that contained amino acid, which he required after having two hair transplants. He kept the shampoo in his car so his girlfriend would not find out about his hair loss.

Collins was found guilty of five counts of GBH with intent and nine counts of ABH against 14 people and sentenced to 20 years of imprisonment.

==== Joanne Rand ====
On 3 June 2017, Joanne Rand (1969/70 – 14 June 2017), a 47-year-old mother-of-three who worked as a carer for dementia patients, was splashed with industrial-strength sulphuric acid during a fight between teenager Xeneral Webster and another man in High Wycombe, Buckinghamshire. Rand had just visited her daughter's grave when Webster, who had travelled to High Wycombe from London, tried to steal a bicycle from the other man and threatened him with an open bottle of acid. The man kicked the bottle from Webster's hand, sending a spray of the substance over Rand, who was seated on a nearby bench. Rand was treated for burns at Stoke Mandeville Hospital and discharged, but subsequently died from multi-organ failure eleven days later, after contracting septicaemia.

In October 2017, Webster, of Hammersmith and Fulham, was charged with Rand's murder and appeared at Amersham Magistrates' Court, where he was remanded in custody. At his trial, held at Reading Crown Court in April 2018, he pleaded guilty to manslaughter. In July 2018, Webster, then aged 19, was sentenced to 17 years in prison. The case was the first acid killing in the UK. Webster subsequently launched an appeal against the conviction, claiming he had been given incorrect legal advice, but this was rejected by the Court of Appeal in July 2020.

In January 2019, it emerged that a previous acid attack, committed outside a cinema in Ealing, west London, in March 2017, had been linked to Webster, and that an officer with the Metropolitan Police was under investigation for not circulating CCTV video of the incident until November 2018, by which time Webster was serving a prison sentence for the manslaughter of Joanne Rand. In June 2020, it was reported that the unnamed officer would face a misconduct hearing. In March 2020, Webster received a life sentence for assaulting a prison officer at HMYOI Aylesbury in December 2018 and was ordered to serve a minimum term of 14 years. He also admitted the March 2017 acid attack at that hearing, which was held at Oxford Crown Court.

==== Jameel Mukhtar and Resham Khan ====
Jameel Mukhtar, 37 years old, and Resham Khan, 21 years old, were attacked by John Tomlin, 24 years old, of Canning Town, on 21 June 2017 in Beckton (London). Mukhtar and Khan, cousins of Asian and Islamic backgrounds, had been out celebrating Khan's 21st birthday when Tomlin began yelling at the two from the pavement. After a brief exchange, Tomlin approached the vehicle and sprayed Khan, the passenger, with a corrosive liquid. Mukhtar, the driver, was unable to drive away, as the cars around him had stopped for the traffic light. He turned the car around in an effort to flee the attack, only for Tomlin to then spray him with the same corrosive liquid he had sprayed Khan with. Footage from a nearby security camera showed Tomlin running alongside the vehicle as Mukhtar attempted to drive away, spraying him until he could no longer keep up. Unable to see as the substance affected his vision, Mukhtar crashed the vehicle and dragged Khan from the car, begging for help from those nearby. Tomlin fled the scene but was ultimately arrested and charged with two counts of grievous bodily harm and, later on, a hate crime. In an interview with the police, Tomlin claimed to have heard voices in his head. Tomlin later pleaded guilty to the two counts of grievous bodily harm and was sentenced to 16 years imprisonment for each count, to run concurrently, of which he must serve at least 10 years before being eligible for release. Mukhtar, who had to be placed in a medically induced coma, suffered permanent hearing and vision loss from the attack, and both he and Khan had to undergo skin grafting. Mukhtar further expressed his disappointment at the sentencing Tomlin received, believing he should have received a life sentence, as the attack had rendered him jobless, scarred, and in constant pain. He also said he believed the attack was motivated by Islamophobia.

==== Jabed Hussain ====
Jabed Hussain, 33 years old, was riding his moped home from work on 13 July 2017 when Derryck John, 17 years old, of Croydon, attacked him with a corrosive substance in an attempt to steal his vehicle. The attack left Hussain with burns to his face and breathing issues. The BBC reported that John had admitted to spraying no less than six motorists with acid over the course of 90 minutes in an effort to steal their mopeds. Hussain expressed a desire for John to receive life imprisonment. John pleaded guilty to six counts of throwing a corrosive liquid with intent to "disable, burn, maim, disfigure or cause grievous bodily harm", two counts of robbery, and four counts of attempted robbery, and was sentenced to 10 and a half years. Another one of his victims was left partially blind.

=== 2019 ===
==== Family in Islington, London ====
On 8 April 2019, a British family of Chinese origin was attacked in Islington (London) by an unknown assailant. The husband and father, a 40-year-old man named Hai, his 36-year-old wife, and their 2-year-old son were sprayed with a corrosive and oxidising substance while walking along Copenhagen Street, near Charlotte Terrace. Passersby purchased water from a nearby store to pour on the family until medical help arrived. The couple suffered burns to their hands and bodies, while the child was burned on the face. No arrests were made. A friend of the family said that they believed Hai, who had been in the United Kingdom for over 20 years, had been targeted.

=== 2023 ===
==== Man in Weymouth, Dorset ====
At 21:55 GMT on 28 April 2023, a man in Weymouth, Dorset, was sprayed with an unknown substance outside of the Smugglers Inn. Dorset & Wiltshire Fire and Rescue Service attended the scene, treating the man for what appeared to be "acid burns which were washed with water". It was thought the offender left in a vehicle. A witness stated how her son attempted to leave the pub but was told by police to leave through another door due to there being acid all over the floor. The man was taken to Dorset County Hospital by ambulance.

On 30 November 2023, it was reported that four people had been arrested in connection with the incident. Three people were arrested on suspicion of conspiracy to inflict grievous bodily harm with intent, while one person was arrested on suspicion of attempted wounding with intent. All of them were released under investigation.

=== 2024 ===
==== Mother and children in Clapham, London ====
On 31 January 2024, Abdul Shakoor Ezedi, an Afghan refugee and convicted sex offender who was granted asylum in the United Kingdom, attacked a young mother and her two young daughters in Clapham, London. Ezedi threw a corrosive alkali substance into a car where the three victims were sitting. Nine other people, including five officers, were also injured in the attack after coming into contact with the corrosive substance. Ezedi was last seen leaning over the railings on Chelsea Bridge later the same evening. On 4 February, a reward of up to £20,000 was offered by police for information leading to his arrest. On 9 February, police said they believed Ezedi had gone into the River Thames after no further footage of him was unearthed following the sighting on Chelsea Bridge and that he may therefore be dead. On 20 February, police announced that a body had been found in the Thames and that distinctive clothing on the body had led them to believe it was Ezedi. On 23 February, police confirmed the body had been identified as that of Ezedi.

==== Westminster Academy attack ====
On 30 September 2024, a man riding an e-scooter attacked two teenagers with a corrosive substance outside Westminster Academy in West London. One of the victims, a 14-year-old girl, suffered severe injuries. A member of staff at the school was also injured while trying to help the victims. A 35-year-old man was arrested in connection with the incident.
