= International Conference for Women Leaders =

Biennial conference in Israel

The International Conference for Women Leaders is a biennial conference established in 1961 and held by MASHAV – Israel’s Agency for International Development Cooperation—at Israel's Ministry of Foreign Affairs, through MASHAV Carmel Training Center (MCTC), in Haifa and Jerusalem. It focuses on development themes of current interest for women in both developing and industrialized countries, often on topics declared by the United Nations to be of international concern.

Each conference’s conclusions and recommendations form a document known as the Haifa Declaration, stating future steps to be taken. A Draft Declaration is handed to the President of the State of Israel at the end of the Conference.

== History ==
The conferences have been taking place for the past 54 years, since the founding of MCTC in 1961 by former Prime Minister Ms. Golda Meir, then Minister of Foreign Affairs. To date, 28 such conferences have been held in cooperation with various international organizations such as UNESCO, IOM, UNIFEM, UNDP, and OSAGI.

Conference participants are key players in the political, economic, and social arenas from around the world, including Ministers, Members of Parliament, and Heads of national and international governmental and non-governmental organizations. The conference program comprises panel discussions, professional study visits, working groups, and official visits to the Knesset (the Israeli Parliament) and the Residence of the President of the State of Israel.

== Conferences ==
The 25th Conference, held in 2007 in cooperation with UNESCO, dealt with the subject of Women’s Leadership for Sustainable Development. In 2009, the implications for women of the 2008 financial crisis was the topic of the joint conference with the UN’s Office of the Special Adviser on Gender Issues and Advancement of Women (OSAGI; later merged into UN Women).

MCTC’s Jubilee Conference in 2011 on Science, Technology and Innovation: Education and Training for Women and Girls was, once again, held in cooperation with UNESCO.

In 2013 MCTC hosted the 28th Conference in the series, this time on the subject of The Post-2015 and Sustainable Development Goals Agenda: Ensuring the Centrality of Gender Equality and Women’s Empowerment in the Next Framework, in cooperation with UN-Women and UNDP.

The 29th International Conference for Women Leaders will be held in October 2015, addressing the issue of Promoting Gender Equality through Economic Empowerment: Implementing the Post-2015 Development Agenda.

It will be the first conference to take place after the United Nations Summit in September, in which the post-2015 development agenda was adopted, and will address the measurable targets and indicators needed to be developed in order to promote economic growth and employment.
