= Cambodian Acid Survivors Charity =

Cambodian charity

- The CASC Logo

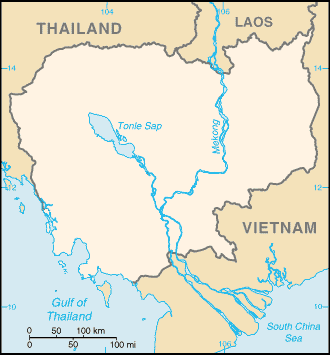
- Cambodia
- Abbreviation: CASC
- Formation: 2006
- Type: INGO
- Purpose: Supporting and empowering acid burn survivors and eliminating acid violence.
- Headquarters: Phnom Penh
- Region served: Cambodia
- Official language: English and Khmer
- Affiliations: Children's Surgical Centre CSC
- Website: CASC

The Cambodian Acid Survivors Charity (CASC) is a non-profit, non-governmental and non-religious organization located in Phnom Penh, Cambodia, committed to empowering and supporting survivors of acid burns and eliminating acid violence through legal reform and preventative education.

== Introduction ==
The Cambodian Acid Survivors Charity (CASC) was established in 2006, by its sister organization, The Children's Surgical Centre (CSC), in response to a growing number of acid burn survivors accessing the center for treatment. It was perceived that the extensive and unique treatment needs presented by survivors of acid burns required a separate organization dedicated to meeting the physical, emotional, social and economic needs of survivors. CASC is the only organization in Cambodia dealing exclusively with the issues of acid burns and acid attacks. Using a holistic approach, CASC works at several different levels to support and empower survivors of acid burns, as well as towards the elimination of acid violence altogether. CASC is an NGO registered in the US out of Alaska, under AK Entity number 110501. In Cambodia, CASC is registered with the Ministry of Foreign Affairs and International Cooperation, as well as the Ministry of Health.

Due to the decreased prevalence of acid burns in Cambodia, CASC closed its doors in 2019. However, CSC is still able to treat burn patients free of charge.

== Services ==
CASC services include:

- Surgical, medical, and psychological treatment
- Vocational training and social reintegration projects
- Legal assistance and advocacy for legal reform
- Awareness raising, research, education and advocacy to eliminate acid violence altogether

The four petals in the CASC logo reflect the different aspects of CASC's work. All CASC services are free of charge.

== Activities ==
Since CASC's formation in 2006, it has been providing survivors of acid attacks with shelter, occupational training, educational funding, specialist surgery, physiotherapy and psychological counseling, both on an individual and group basis. In an attempt to curb social marginalization and keep survivors connected after leaving CASC, a monthly Acid Burn Survivors Support Group was established.

CASC also runs several social reintegration projects for survivors. One CASC project trained four survivors as masseurs and opened a massage parlor, Kanya Massage, as a means of providing the survivors with a skill, work experience and an income. In addition, CASC runs a scheme entitled ‘babs', or bags by acid burn survivors, where survivors (some of them blinded by the acid) are trained to crochet bags that are then retailed by CASC on their behalf. CASC also continues its partnership with CSC, enabling its survivors to have access to vital medical services.

In the case of acid attacks, Chrac mentioned that roughly one-quarter of acid burn victims are injured accidentally, and, contrary to popular belief, fewer than 10 percent of acid attacks are fuelled by domestic violence.
