= Sangita Magar =

Nepalese activist

- Occupation: Activist

Sangita Magar (Nepali: संगीता मगर) is a Nepalese woman who became an activist for victims' rights after surviving an acid attack. She and a friend were attacked when she was 16, but managed to take her SLC exam 25 days later. She subsequently fought to change laws pertaining to victims of such attacks and to the unregulated sale of acid.

== Biography ==
Sangita Magar was a 16-year-old school girl when she was attacked on 22 February 2015, at Shanti Nikunja School in Basantapur, Kathmandu, where she was preparing for her Secondary School Leaving Certificate (SLC) with her friend Sima Basnet, aged 15. Four masked men forced them into a room and splashed the acid on them. After the attack she went through treatments at the Kathmandu Medical College; Sima Basnet was admitted to Bir Hospital. Magar's father told The Kathmandu Post, "Three other girls and my daughter were studying on their own after their teacher was late to arrive in the class. The attackers entered by breaking the door and threw acid at them". While undergoing treatment, she became suicidal, considering taking her life by jumping out of the hospital window.

An investigation revealed that a 20-year-old man who lived in the same building as Magar carried out the attack. The attacker claimed he was a jilted lover, but Magar denied ever having been involved with him, and that she barely ever interacted with him. He was sentenced to 10 years in jail for attempted murder; but in the courtroom he smiled, showing no remorse, and threatening revenge. She did not leave the house for three years.

Sima Basnet wrote the then-Prime Minister of Nepal, Sushil Koirala, to request that they be allowed to take the exam for their Secondary School Leaving Certificate (SLC), despite still being in hospital. Koirala ordered the Ministry of Education to grant the request; Sima, at the Bir Hospital, took the exam by herself, while Sangita got assistance at Kathmandu Medical College Hospital.

Nepal averages around 40 acid attacks per year, and victims like Magar were not entitled to any immediate payment to help with urgent medical care. In 2017, Magar and Basnet were plaintiffs in a case supported also by Forum for Women, Law and Development, a women's rights group, that challenged Nepal's laws on acid and burn violence, a case that resulted in the Nepalese Supreme Court ordering for victims to get immediate financial support for treatment. In addition, the court ordered that penalties for committing acid attacks be increased from three to ten years' imprisonment. These decisions became law in August 2018, with hospitals now providing free immediate treatment to acid attack victims. Since then, Magar has been fighting to stop the unregulated sale of the acids used in such attacks, for life punishment for those who commit such attacks, and for more support for acid attack survivors, including compensation.
