= Natalia Ponce de León =

Colombian campaigner

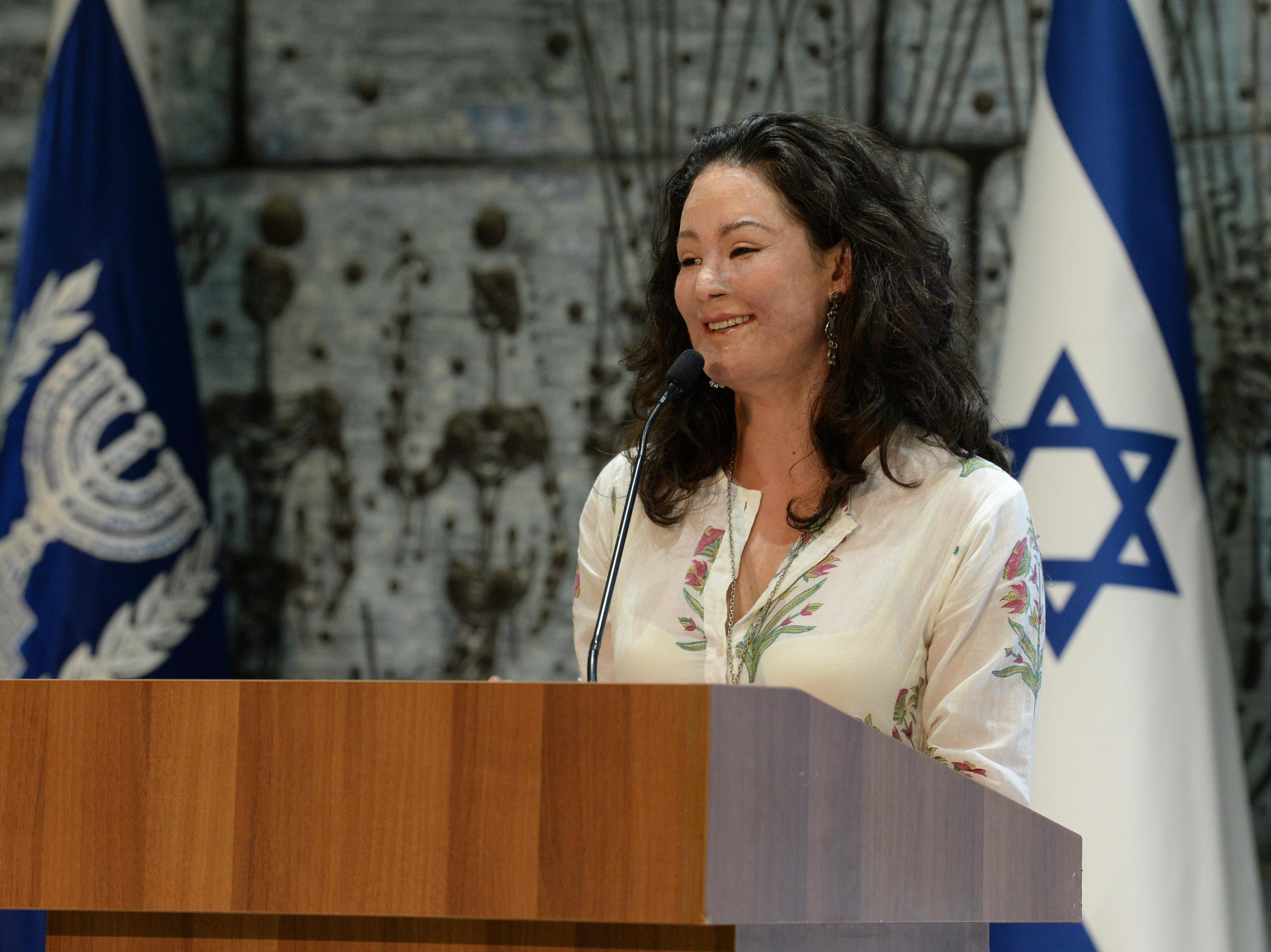
Natalia Ponce de León in Mashav's 30th international Women Leading Conference in Israel, May 2018

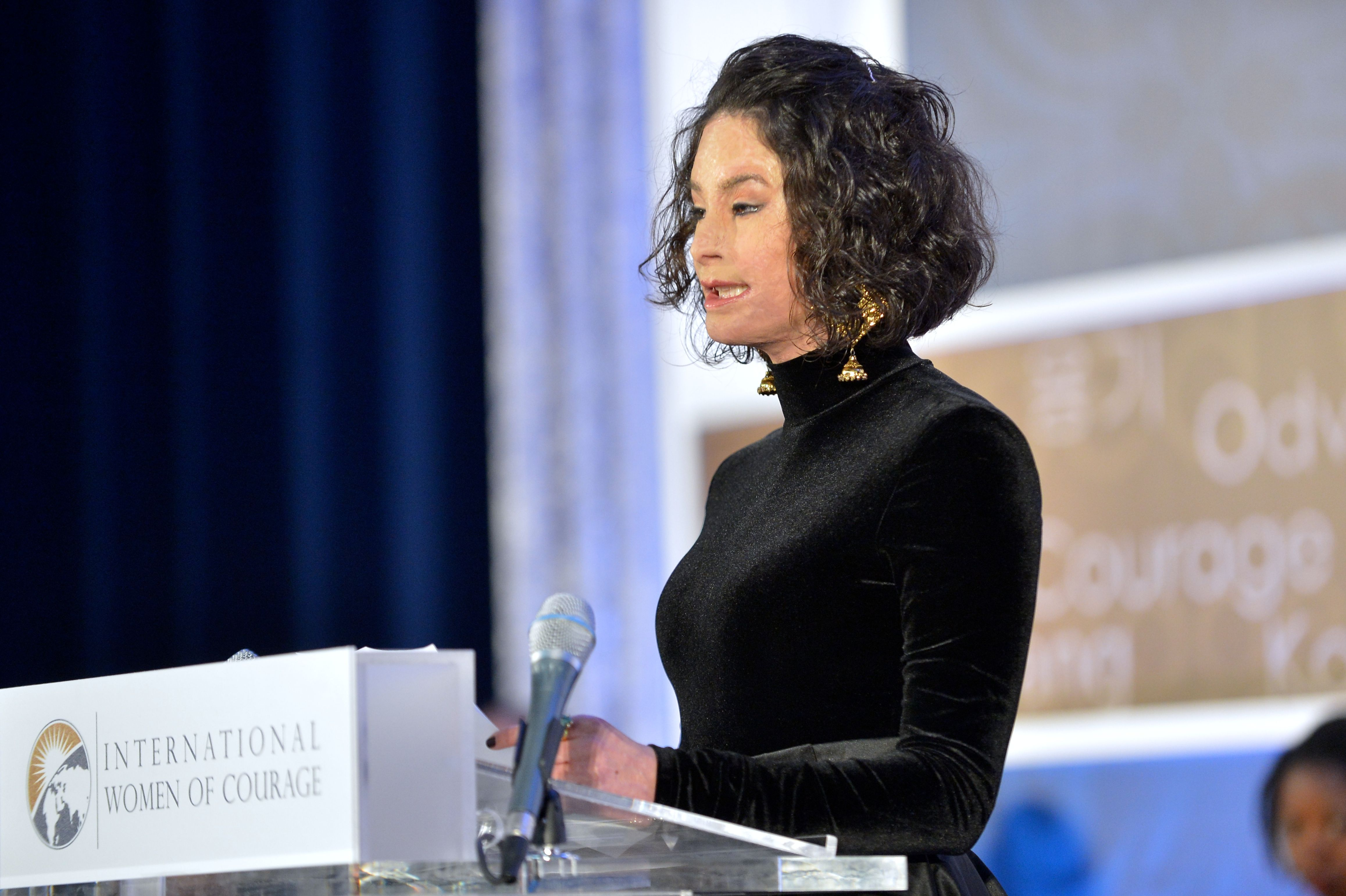
2017 International Women of Courage awardee Natalia Ponce de Leon of Colombia delivers remarks during a ceremony at the U.S. Department of State in Washington, D.C., on March 29, 2017

Natalia Ponce de León (born August 8, 1980) is a Colombian woman born in Bogotá. A crime victim and survivor who successfully campaigned for a law targeting perpetrators of acid attacks in her country, in 2016, she was listed as one of BBC's 100 Women. She holds a bachelor's degree in Film Studies from Politécnico Grancolombiano University in Bogotá, Colombia.

== Attack ==
Ponce de León had recently returned to Bogotá after living for a short time in London where she was studying English and working as a restaurant waitress. Once back in Colombia she started working with her mother, manufacturing school uniforms. She was unexpectedly assaulted by Jonathan Vega, who threw a liter of sulphuric acid on her face and body on March 27, 2014 while she was visiting her mother in Santa Barbára. Vega, a former neighbor, was reported to have been "obsessed" with Ponce de León and had been making death threats against her after she turned down his proposal for a relationship. 24% of her body was severely burned as a result of the attack. Ponce de León has undergone 37 reconstruction surgeries on her face and body since the attack.

== Public outcry and new law ==
Her case was not an isolated incident. Three years before the attack took place, Colombia reported one of the highest rates of acid attacks per capita in the world. However, there was not an effective law in place until Ponce de León's campaign took off in the months after her attack.

The new law, which is named after her, defines acid attacks as a specific crime and increases maximum sentences to 50 years in jail for convicted offenders. The law also aims to provide victims with better state medical care including reconstructive surgery and psychological therapy. Ponce de León expressed hope that the new law would act as a deterrent against future attacks.

== Media coverage ==
Initially, Ponce de León spoke publicly with a protective mask during her campaigning. However, she decided to show her face when the book El renacimiento de Natalia Ponce de León (The Rebirth of Natalia Ponce de León), which tells her story, was published in April 2015.
