= IsraAid =

Disaster relief organization

IsraAID
- Founded: 2001; 25 years ago
- Type: International organization
- Purpose: Emergency response, disaster relief, advocacy, international development, community development, emergency aid, psychosocial support, water, sanitation & hygiene, education, medical support, livelihood
- Region served: Worldwide
- Website: www.israaid.org

IsraAID (The Israel Forum for International Humanitarian Aid) is an Israel-based, non-governmental organization (NGO) that responds to emergencies all over the world with targeted humanitarian help. IsraAID was founded by Shachar Zahavi and Mully Dor. This includes disaster relief, from search and rescue to rebuilding communities and schools, to providing aid packages, medical assistance, and post-psychotrauma care. IsraAID has also been involved in emergency response and international development projects in more than 60 countries, with focuses on Water, Sanitation & Hygiene, public health and medical care education, and mental health and protection.

== Purpose ==
IsraAID was founded in 2001 as a coalition of Israeli aid and international development organizations, growing into an independent NGO with 300 team members worldwide.

The organization's mission is "to support people affected by humanitarian crisis. We partner with local communities around the world to provide urgent aid, assist in recovery, and reduce the risk of future disasters."

== Structure and funding ==
IsraAID was founded as an umbrella organization by Shachar Zahavi and Mully Dor and consisted of Jewish and Israeli search and rescue, medical and relief groups that provide aid worldwide to people in need, regardless of race, religion, nationality or disability. Today, it is an independent humanitarian aid agency and has worked on emergency response and long-term development projects in more than 60 countries worldwide. The group's CEO is Yotam Polizer and its global chair is Meira Aboulafia.

IsraAID is funded by a range of Israeli, North American, and global private individuals, foundations, community organizations, institutions, and corporations.

== Projects ==
2004 - Israel sent 150 army doctors and search and rescue teams to tsunami victims in Sri Lanka, but since Sri Lanka declined that offer, Israel instead sent a smaller number of IDF personnel along with an 82-ton planeload of relief supplies, including blankets, food, water, baby food and over nine tons of medicine. The relief effort was coordinated by IsraAID.

2005 - Israel provided tsunami crisis relief for Sri Lanka "spearheaded" by IsraAID. A humanitarian team of 14 medical and logistical personnel was sent to Sri Lanka to help those affected by the tsunami.

2007 - IsraAID sent six doctors and nurses to Peru to assist in rescue efforts and provide medical care after a major earthquake.

2007 - Israeli volunteers went to a refugee camp on the Kenyan-Somalian border to provide relief for Muslim refugees in Somalia. The Jerusalem AIDS Project, an Israeli organization under the umbrella of IsraAID which promotes HIV/AIDS education and prevention, distributed clothes for infants and toddlers. Later they would meet with IsraAID in order to purchase basic medical equipment.

2008 - B'nai B'rith International, one of the founding members of IsraAID and in partnership with IsraAID, provided thousands of meals to an estimated 35,000 Georgian war refugees.

2008 - Israeli aid teams went to Myanmar to help with recovery after a major cyclone. According to the Jerusalem Post:

The IsraAID organization, which sends help to foreign countries in need, will be sending to Myanmar a highly trained search-and-rescue team and a 10-member team of doctors and nurses. The teams will bring with them crucial supplies, including plastic sheeting, food, household appliances and water filters.

2009 - IsraAID sent six volunteer doctors, nurses and paramedics to the Philippines to assist Operation Blessing International after two devastating typhoons.

2010 - In response to the 2010 Haiti earthquake, IsraAID sent a 15-person search-and-rescue team, which includes emergency medical staff to Haiti. The IsraAID team set up treatment rooms to treat the injured at the collapsed main hospital in Port-au-Prince, as well as outside the city in a makeshift clinic in a football stadium, and has helped coordinate relief supply logistics. In February, IsraAID opened a child education center in February in the Pétion-Ville refugee camp, the largest refugee camp in Port-au-Prince area, together with other agencies, such as Operation Blessing. The center was set up initially in the tents from the IDF’s field hospital.

2012 - In March, IsraAID helped South Sudan set up its Ministry of Social Development to provide social services to the population after decades of war and hardship.

2013 - After Typhoon Haiyan, IsraAID sent a team of seven medical professionals to Tacloban City in the Philippines.

2014 - In July, IsraAID sent a team to Washington State to help in the recovery effort after the Carlton Complex Fire that consumed some 400 square miles and approximately 300 homes.

2015 - During the 2015 European migrant crisis, IsraAID sent an Advanced Emergency Team to Greece and assessment and relief missions to Serbia and Croatia to facilitate the passage of refugees to Europe.

In response to the April 2015 Nepal earthquake, IsraAID sent an emergency response team to affected communities and helped facilitate the communities' recovery over the following years.

2016 - In August, IsraAID sent a 20-member staff of search and rescue, relief and trauma specialists to the site of the August 2016 Central Italy earthquake, becoming the only foreign aid organization on the ground.

2019 - In March, IsraAID sent personnel to Mozambique to assist in the recovery from Cyclone Idai. Personnel were prepared to offer medical supplies, relief supplies, and psychological care to people affected by the storm. Personnel were also prepared to help restore access to safe water.

2020 - IsraAID launched a global response to the COVID-19 pandemic across 16 countries.

2021 - In September, following the American withdrawal and Taliban takeover of Afghanistan, IsraAID and partners facilitated the safe evacuation of more than 160 vulnerable Afghan civilians to the UAE and Albania.

2022 - In February, IsraAID launched its response to the full-scale invasion of Ukraine, initially on the Moldova-Ukraine border, expanding later to Romania, and then into Ukraine itself, where the organization has delivered mental health support, and large-scale safe water programs.

2023 - In October, following the October 7 attacks, IsraAID launched its first large-scale emergency response operation inside Israel, supporting displaced communities from Israel's Gaza border region, providing rocket shelters in Bedouin villages together with local partners, supporting therapeutic retreats for survivors of the Nova festival massacre, and working with partners to train local disaster response teams across northern Israel.

2026 - Following the 2026 Nepal floods, IsraAID deployed emergency teams to Nepal to provide relief supplies, medical care and mental health support to affected communities.

== See also ==
- Mashav
- Latet
