= Children's Surgical Centre =

Coordinates: 11.600533°N 104.931374°E

- មជ្ឈមណ្ឌលវះកាត់កុមារ
- Abbreviation: CSC
- Formation: 1998
- Type: INGO
- Purpose: Providing free surgical care and rehabilitation to children and adults of Cambodia
- Headquarters: Phnom Penh
- Region served: Cambodia
- Official language: Khmer and English
- Affiliations: CASC
- Website: csc.org

The Children's Surgical Centre (CSC; Khmer: មជ្ឈមណ្ឌលវះកាត់កុមារ) is a non-profit, non-governmental, and non-religious surgical hospital in Phnom Penh, Cambodia and registered as a 501(c)(3) in the United States. Founded in 1998, the centre aims to improve the quality of life for disabled children and adults by providing free rehabilitative surgery.

Surgeries at CSC include orthopedic surgery, ophthalmology, ent surgery and plastic and burn surgery. The organization also has a training program in order to help develop sustainable health services in Cambodia.

CSC was the subject of the BBC documentary Cambodia Surgical Ward, which aired in January 2010, and was selected as one of BBC's top 10 programs of the year

== Introduction ==
CSC is located in the Kien Khleang National Rehabilitation Center for the disabled in Phnom Penh, Cambodia. Within Cambodia, the organization is registered with the Ministry of Foreign Affairs and International Cooperation, the Ministry of Social Affairs, Veterans and Youth Rehabilitation, and the Ministry of Health.

CSC's Founder and CEO, British-American orthopedic surgeon, Dr. Jim Gollogly first came to Cambodia in 1992 on an assignment with the American Red Cross. He returned in 1998 to start a surgical program for landmine victims. Dr. Gollogly was awarded an Order of the British Empire (OBE) in 2008 for this work in Cambodia. Since its inception, patient numbers have increased from 25 surgeries in its first year to 4,965 free surgeries in 2012, and 6,150 surgeries in 2013.

== Services ==
Once a patient presents to CSC, the medical consultation and surgeries are free of charge. Patients arrive from all over the country for correction of various disabilities and health issues.

Services include:

Orthopedics: Correction of deformities from polio and other infectious diseases, correction of club feet and other congenital abnormalities, treatment of chronic dislocations, malunited fractures and nonunions of fractures, hip replacement, spinal surgery and others.

Ophthalmology: Oculoplastic surgery, correction of strabismus, ptosis, cataract surgery, fitting of artificial eyes, laser and retinal surgery, and others.

ENT: Tympanoplasty, mastoidectomy and ossiculoplasty

Maxillofacial: Cleft lip and palate repairs, facial reconstruction for fractures and traumatic defects, corrections of deformities caused by severe infections such as noma, removal of head and neck tumors, and others.

Plastic Surgery: Treatment of unhealed burn wounds with skin grafts and flaps, release of burn contractures, congenital deformities such as syndactyly, and a wide variety of other procedures to decrease disability and improve appearance and function.

Anesthesia: Local, regional, spinal and general anesthesia, endoscopic intubation, pediatric and adult anesthesia.

Other: CSC performs other specialised procedures such as meningoencephalocele, and fistula repair; and some routine ear, nose and throat procedures.

Post-operative care: Inpatients at CSC stay for varied amounts of time depending on the treatment received. Free meals and clean drinking water are provided throughout the duration of the stay for both the patient and their caretaker/family member. CSC also provides physiotherapy and speech therapy services.

From 2006 - 2019, CSC also partnered with the Cambodian Acid Survivors Charity (CASC) - the only organization in Cambodia working solely with survivors of acid burns. CASC was founded to address the long-term needs of CSC acid burn patients, but due to the decline in prevalence of acid burn patients, CASC closed its doors in 2019. CSC continues to provide treatment to burn patients with Dr. Jim Gollogly acting as the CEO of both organizations.

== Training and research ==
CSC employs 135 staff, including surgeons, nurses, lab technicians, IT, administration, cooks and maintenance personnel. Children's Surgical Centre has partnerships with University of Hong Kong, University of Toronto, University of Washington, Oxford University and University of Bristol, among others. Doctors and health professionals from these institutions, and from around the world come regularly and repeatedly to teach as part of CSC's mission to develop sustainable health services. Additionally, some of the CSC staff are sent abroad for training courses and medical conferences. CSC also hosts final year medical students on elective from around the world.

CSC has articles published in numerous journals, including the Journal of Craniofacial Surgery, Journal of Neurosurgery, Asian Biomedicine, and others.
