= Indo-Israeli Centre of Excellence for Animal Husbandary & Dairying, Hisar =

Future agricultural research center in Hisar, India

- Type: Public
- Established: 2017
- Affiliations: MASHAV & ICAR
- Location: Hisar, Haryana, India; 29.1924°N 75.6933°E
- Campus: Urban
- Area: Within Government Livestock Farm, Hisar
- Nickname: CPB
- Website: cpbhisar.org

Indo-Israeli Centre of Excellence for Animal Husbandary & Dairying, Hisar, established by Haryana State in collaboration with MASHAV. The centre conducts research and training for cost-effective and innovative localised animal husbandry in India and dairy technologies for the intensive dairy production system of global standards to enhance per capita availability of milk. It is located within the Government Livestock Farm at Hisar in Haryana state of India.

== History ==
It was established with a cost of INR 15 crore (150 million), based on a Memorandum of understanding signed between State Government of Haryana with MASHAV in April 2015.

== Objectives ==
Since Haryana aims to be the leading state of the country in milk production, Israel, a leading country in terms of its dairy management techniques, is a model for Haryana to follow. Israel produces 5 to 6 times more milk per milk animal compared to India. Israel and India produce 36 liter and 6.868 liter milk per milch animal respectively. Israeli technical assistance is helpful for Haryana in becoming a leading state in terms of milk production.

== See also ==
- List of universities and colleges in Hisar
- List of institutions of higher education in Haryana
- List of think tanks in India
