= Clapham alkali attack =

2024 attack and manhunt in London

- Location: 51.4549°N 0.1447°W; Clapham, London, England
- Date: 31 January 2024 c.19:25 (GMT)
- Attack type: Corrosive fluid attack
- Weapon: Alkali substance
- Injuries: 12
- Assailant: Abdul Ezedi

On the evening of 31 January 2024, 35-year-old Abdul Ezedi attacked a 31-year-old woman and her two children with a corrosive alkaline substance on a street in Clapham, London. Ezedi fled, and was not seen after appearing on CCTV at Chelsea Bridge late the same evening. On 20 February, his body was found in the River Thames near Tower Bridge.

Nine others were injured in the attack, including members of the public and police who assisted those initially assaulted.

== Background ==
London has been described as a "hotspot" for corrosive fluid attacks, with a peak of 472 in the city in 2017. Since then, the number of reported attacks has declined steeply. The Offences Against the Person Act 1861 governs such attacks; Section 29 refers to "sending, throwing or using explosive or corrosive substance or noxious thing with intent to do grievous bodily harm" and can carry a sentence of life imprisonment. Similarly, Section 1 of the Prevention of Crime Act 1953 makes it an offence to possess "acid in a public place with intent to use it to cause harm". The Offensive Weapons Act 2019 introduced the offence of "having a corrosive substance in a public place [without] a good reason or lawful authority". This carries a prison sentence of up to four years' imprisonment.

=== Perpetrator ===
Abdul Shokoor Ezedi (born 22 June 1988) was from Afghanistan, where he grew up with "no education" and was taught to read and write by a neighbour. His sister was shot dead in Afghanistan, with a friend of Ezedi stating he was "not the same" after her murder. Ezedi arrived in the United Kingdom via lorry in 2016 as an asylum seeker and settled in Newcastle. He made an unsuccessful application for asylum; his appeal was dismissed in 2017 due to inconsistencies in his version of events.

In 2017, Ezedi sexually assaulted a woman by grabbing her buttocks. In the same year, he exposed himself. On 9 January 2018 he was sentenced at Newcastle Crown Court to nine weeks' imprisonment and 200 hours of unpaid work for sexual assault and 45 weeks' imprisonment for indecent exposure, with both custodial sentences being suspended for two years. He was placed on the sex offender register for ten years. In 2020, Ezedi was discharged from supervision from the probation service, having completed his unpaid work order. He remained in the Newcastle area, living in Byker and working at a pizza shop in Forest Hall.

In June 2020 Ezedi was baptised, and he applied for asylum again, stating that he had converted to Christianity and would be at risk from the Taliban if he returned to Afghanistan. This second application was refused. He unsuccessfully appealed the decision by the Home Office at a tribunal in October 2020. The tribunal heard from a Baptist minister in the North East of England who stated his belief that Ezedi had become a Christian and was "wholly committed". Ezedi was a client of the Diocese of Hexham and Newcastle's Justice and Peace Refugee Project, where he was provided with toiletries and food tokens. The project provided Ezedi accommodation between April 2021 and March 2022, as part of their "Action Letting" project for refugees granted leave to remain which Ezedi had secured in 2021 or 2022. After leaving the accommodation, Ezedi moved into homeless accommodation. He later lived in a social housing block, having moved there in approximately October 2023. He was described as "keep[ing] himself to himself", "unassuming [and] quiet", and "very respectful".

== Attack ==
In the early hours of 31 January 2024, Ezedi drove from the Newcastle area to London, where his car was seen in Tooting at 06:30 GMT. At 16:30, his car was seen in Croydon, and at approximately 19:00 it was seen being driven in Streatham. He then met with a 31-year-old woman, with whom he had previously been in a relationship, on Lessar Avenue in Clapham. The meeting had been arranged earlier that day, and the woman arrived in a car along with her two young children.

Video footage appears to show Ezedi running a person over in his car. At approximately 19:25, residents of Lessar Avenue saw him twice "throwing a child on the floor", having removed the child from the rear passenger seat. After attacking the child, Ezedi threw an alkali substance at the mother. A resident rescued the child, and suffered burns to her face and arm. A witness described the mother as walking up the road, crying "I can't see, I can't see". Ezedi attempted to flee in his car, but in doing so crashed into a parked car. He fled from the scene on foot, initially chased by a member of the public.

At 19:29, the London Ambulance Service were called and sent two incident response officers, three ambulance crews and members of the hazardous area response team to the scene. At approximately 19:30, police were called to the scene, with Metropolitan Police officers arriving shortly afterwards.

=== Ezedi ===
Ezedi's movements after the attack were subject to police scrutiny of CCTV footage. At 19:33, he boarded a northbound train at Clapham South, alighting at King's Cross St Pancras. He was next seen on CCTV at a supermarket on Caledonian Road at 20:42, before returning to King's Cross and boarding a southbound Victoria line train. He interchanged at Victoria, taking a District line train travelling eastbound, before alighting at Tower Hill at 21:33. On foot, Ezedi was seen on CCTV in the Southwark Bridge area, before walking along Upper Thames Street and Paul's Walk near the Millennium Bridge. He continued west onto the Victoria Embankment, being seen near Unilever House at 22:04, before crossing Westminster Bridge eastward at 22:33. At 23:00, he re-crossed the Thames at Vauxhall Bridge, before continuing west to Chelsea Bridge. At 23:25, he was seen crossing the bridge southbound, momentarily entering Battersea Park, before returning to the bridge The last sighting of Ezedi was on the bridge at 23:27, where CCTV showed him pacing on the bridge and leaning over the railings.

=== Victims ===
The woman and her children were taken to hospital; the woman and her youngest child had injuries described as "life-changing". Nine other people were injured, including witnesses and police officers. Some were hospitalised at a major trauma centre to treat burn injuries.

On 5 February, police confirmed that the woman was in a critical but stable condition. The following day, the BBC reported that the woman was still in hospital and was sedated. They added that she may lose her sight in her right eye. It was reported that the woman's children have since been discharged from hospital. On 7 February, at a press conference, Commander Jon Savell reiterated that the woman was still sedated and was still "very poorly". As a result, police had not been able to speak to her, although her children had been able to give an account to police as to what occurred.

== Investigation ==
Over the night after the attack, search warrants were executed at addresses in east London and Newcastle. Ezedi left both his car and mobile phone at the scene, which were examined by forensic teams.

Whilst not being treated as a terror-related incident, the Metropolitan Police's Counter Terrorism fugitive team became involved in the investigation, tracing Ezedi's movements. In order to locate him, detectives scrutinised CCTV from Transport for London. Ezedi's bank card was not used after he took the underground from King's Cross to Tower Hill.

As well as investigations in London and Newcastle, police forces across the country were put on "high alert", with the Border Force and National Crime Agency (NCA) assisting the Metropolitan Police.

Superintendent Gabriel Cameron, attached to Lambeth Police Station, briefed the press on the morning of 1 February. He named the suspect as Ezedi, describing how he had significant injuries to the right side of his face. He explained that the woman and children were in a stable condition and that their injuries could be life-changing, and that Ezedi should not be approached if seen. Cameron stated that the Metropolitan Police were working with other agencies in order to locate Ezedi, including Northumbria Police and British Transport Police, believing that Ezedi could be returning to the Newcastle area. That day, the Metropolitan Police confirmed that the substance used during the attack was alkaline.

On 2 February, police raided an address in the Leyton area and the following day footage was released of officers searching Ezedi's address in Newcastle, where they discovered a number of empty containers with corrosive warning labels.

On 4 February a £20,000 reward was offered for information that led to Ezedi's arrest. Former senior counter-terrorism police officer Nick Aldworth told the BBC Radio 4 Today programme that rewards were offered by police for information "when there is a sense someone is hiding within the community, possibly with help from others".

On 5 February it was reported that a 22-year-old man had been arrested on suspicion of assisting Ezedi, contrary to Section 4 of the Criminal Law Act 1967. He was taken to a south London police station, interviewed and later bailed the same day. At this point, the Metropolitan Police's theories were that Ezedi had come to harm or was being harboured. On the former theory, Ezedi's route on leaving the attack scene appeared to follow the River Thames, with investigators keeping an open mind as to whether Ezedi entered the water, either by jumping or having been pushed, although the police were not searching the River Thames. A former senior counter-terrorism police officer stated that it was "not unlikely or improbable" that Ezedi may have killed himself. On the latter theory, police previously warned that anyone found assisting him faced arrest. Former Metropolitan Police Detective Chief Inspector Peter Kirkham stated he believed that Ezedi was "being sheltered by an ally or had escaped abroad".

On 6 February, police reported that they had received and discounted more than 200 calls from the public. Speaking to the press, Commander Jon Savell stated that as no-one had spotted Ezedi, it was "realistic" that "he has either come to harm and is lying somewhere and yet to be found, or someone's looking after him, as he's not been outside for some time".

At a press conference on 7 February, Savell told reporters that investigators had been working continuously since the incident, with early enquiries being on port alerts alongside officers at border agencies. Members of the press questioned how Ezedi could not have been found in a city like London, with a dense population of CCTV. In response, Savell stated that if Ezedi was hiding' it would be difficult to find him, although hundreds of Metropolitan Police were following lines of enquiries, including examining huge amounts of CCTV footage. Savell added that, through work with the NCA, the Metropolitan Police had been in contact with medical experts who stated that Ezedi's injuries could be very serious or fatal. If he did not receive medical attention, his health would continue to deteriorate through infection. As a result, Savell appealed to Ezedi to hand himself in for medical attention, adding that hospitals remained on high-alert. Savell told the press that the victim and Ezedi were in a relationship and that the relationship appeared to have broken down, with this being an indication of the motive of the attack.

At a further press conference on 9 February, police said their main working hypothesis was that Ezedi had entered the River Thames in the Chelsea Bridge area. Police said Ezedi could be seen "walking with purpose" for four miles (6.4 km) to the Thames. At Chelsea Bridge his behaviour changed and he was seen to lean over the railings. From this point, CCTV sightings of Ezedi stopped. Police began searching the Thames at low tide on 10 February, and recovered Ezedi's body from the river near Tower Millennium Pier on 20 February. A post-mortem on 21 February established that Ezedi died by drowning and on 23 July the coroner ruled it suicide.

== Aftermath ==
Ezedi was buried in an East London cemetery on 11 March, following an Islamic funeral held at a West London mosque. The attack victim was discharged from hospital in late March.
