= Acid attack =

Form of violent assault

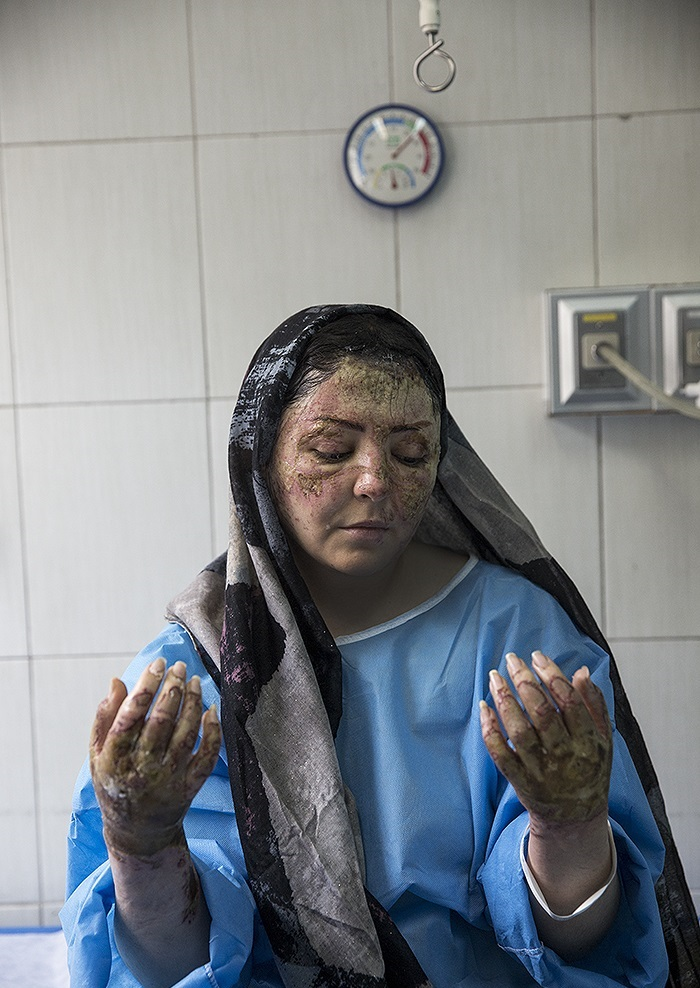
A 37-year-old acid attack victim from Tabriz, Iran

An acid attack, also called acid throwing, vitriol attack, or vitriolage, is a violent assault involving the act of throwing acid or a similarly corrosive substance onto the body of another "with the intention to disfigure, maim, torture, or kill". Perpetrators of these attacks throw corrosive liquids at their victims, usually at their faces, burning them and damaging skin tissue, often exposing and sometimes dissolving the bones. Acid attacks can lead to partial or complete blindness.

The most common acids used in these attacks are sulfuric acid and nitric acid. Hydrochloric acid is sometimes used but is much less damaging. Aqueous solutions of strongly alkaline materials, such as caustic soda (sodium hydroxide) or ammonia, are used as well, particularly in areas where strong acids are controlled substances.

The long-term consequences of these attacks may include eye burns, blindness, severe permanent scarring of the face and body, and far-reaching social, psychological, and economic difficulties.

Although acid attacks occur all over the world, this type of violence is most common in developing regions, It is often gender-related violence, with "a disproportionate impact on women" according to Acid Survivors Trust International (ASTI). However, in countries such as the United Kingdom, where acid attacks are associated primarily with gang violence, the majority of both perpetrators and victims are male.

== Health effects ==
The most notable effect of an acid attack is lifelong disfigurement of the face and body. According to the Acid Survivors Foundation in Bangladesh, victims of acid attacks have a high survival rate. Victims that survive face physical challenges, which require long-term surgical treatment, and psychological challenges, which require in-depth intervention from psychologists and counselors at each stage of physical recovery. These far-reaching effects on their lives impact their psychological, social, and economic viability in communities.

=== Medical ===
The medical effects of acid attacks are extensive. As a majority of acid attacks are aimed at the face, several articles thoroughly reviewed the medical implications for these victims. The severity of the damage depends on the concentration of the acid and the time before the acid is thoroughly washed off with water or neutralized with a neutralizing agent. The acid can rapidly eat away skin, the layer of fat beneath the skin, and in some cases even the underlying bone. Eyelids and lips may be completely destroyed and the nose and ears severely damaged. Though not exhaustive, Acid Survivors Foundation Uganda findings included:

- The skull is partly destroyed or deformed and hair lost.
- Ear cartilage is usually partly or totally destroyed; deafness may occur.
- Eyelids may be burned off or deformed, leaving the eyes extremely dry and prone to blindness. Acid directly in the eye also damages sight, sometimes causing blindness in both eyes.
- The nose can become shrunken and deformed; the nostrils may close off completely due to destroyed cartilage.
- The mouth becomes shrunken and narrow, and it may lose its full range of motion. Sometimes, the lips may be partly or totally destroyed, exposing the teeth. Eating and speaking can become difficult.
- Scars can run down from the chin to neck area, shrinking the chin, and burn scar contracture can extremely limit range of motion in the neck.
- Inhalation of acid and fumes usually creates respiratory problems, exacerbated restricted airway pathways (the esophagus and nostrils) in acid patients.

In addition to these above-mentioned medical effects, acid attack victims face the possibility of sepsis, kidney failure, skin depigmentation, and even death.

=== Psychological ===
After physical recovery, acid assault survivors face many mental health issues, primarily depression and anxiety. Additionally, victims reported lowered self-esteem according to the Rosenberg scale and increased self-consciousness, both in general and in the social sphere.

=== Social ===
In addition to medical and psychological effects, many social implications exist for acid survivors, especially women. For example, such attacks usually leave victims disabled in some way, rendering them dependent on their spouse and/or family for everyday activities, such as eating and running errands. These dependencies are increased by the fact that many acid survivors cannot find suitable work, due to impaired vision and physical disability. This negatively impacts their economic viability, causing hardships on the spouses and families that care for them. As a result, divorce rates are high, with abandonment by husbands found in 25% of acid assault cases in Uganda (compared to only 3% of wives abandoning their disfigured husbands). Moreover, acid survivors who are single when attacked almost certainly become ostracized from society, effectively ruining marriage prospects. Some media outlets overwhelmingly avoid reporting acid attack violence, or the description of the attack is laconic or often implies that the act was inevitable or even justified.

== Treatment and consequences ==
When acids contact the skin, response time can affect the severity of burns. If washed away with water or neutralized promptly, burns can be minimized or avoided entirely. However, areas unprotected by skin, such as the cornea of the eye or the lips, may be burned immediately on contact.

Many victims are attacked in an area without immediate access to water, or unable to see due to being blinded or forced to keep their eyes closed to prevent additional burns to the eye. Treatment for burn victims remains inadequate in many developing nations where incidence is high. Medical underfunding has resulted in very few burn centers available for victims in countries such as Uganda, Bangladesh, and Cambodia. Uganda has one specialized burn center in the entire nation, opening in 2003; Cambodia has only one burn facility for victims, and scholars estimate that only 30% of the Bangladeshi community has access to health care.

In addition to inadequate medical capabilities, many acid assault victims fail to report to the police due to a lack of trust in the force, a sense of hopelessness due to the attackers' impunity, and fear of retribution by the assailant(s).

These problems are exacerbated by a lack of knowledge of how to treat burns: some victims have applied oil to the acid, rather than rinsing thoroughly and completely with water for 30 minutes or longer to neutralize the acid. Such home remedies only serve to increase the severity of damage, as they do not counteract the acidity.

== Motivation of perpetrators ==
The intention of the attacker is often to cause shame and pain rather than to kill the victim. In Britain, such attacks, particularly those against men, are believed to be underreported, and as a result many of them do not show up in official statistics. Some of the most common motivations of perpetrators include:

- Personal conflict regarding intimate relationships and sexual rejection
- Sexual-related jealousy and lust
- Revenge for refusal of sexual advances, proposals of marriage, and demands for dowry
- Gang violence and rivalry
- Conflicts over land ownership, farm animals, housing, and property

Acid attacks often occur as revenge against a woman who rejects a proposal of marriage or a sexual advance. Gender inequality and women's position in the society, in relation to men, plays a significant role in these types of attacks.

Attacks against individuals based on their religious beliefs or social or political activities also occur. These attacks may be targeted against a specific individual, due to their activities, or may be perpetrated against random persons merely because they are part of a social group or community. In Europe, Konstantina Kouneva, a former member of the European Parliament, had acid thrown on her in 2008, in what was described as "the most severe assault on a trade unionist in Greece for 50 years." Female students have had acid thrown in their faces as a punishment for attending school. Acid attacks due to religious conflicts have been also reported. Both males and females have been victims of acid attacks for refusing to convert to another religion.

Conflicts regarding property issues, land disputes, and inheritance have also been reported as motivations of acid attacks. Acid attacks related to conflicts between criminal gangs occur in many places, including the UK, Greece, and Indonesia.

== Epidemiology ==
According to researchers and activists, countries typically associated with acid assault include Bangladesh, India, Nepal, Cambodia, Vietnam, Laos, United Kingdom, Kenya, South Africa, Uganda, Pakistan, and Afghanistan. Acid attacks have been reported however in countries around the world, including:

- Afghanistan
- Australia
- Bangladesh
- Belgium
- Bulgaria
- Cambodia
- China
  - Hong Kong S.A.R.
- Colombia
- France
- Gabon
- Germany
- India
- Indonesia
- Iran
- Ireland
- Israel
- Italy
- Jamaica
- Kenya
- Laos
- Mexico
- Myanmar
- Nepal
- Nigeria
- Philippines
- Pakistan
- Russia
- Sri Lanka
- Sweden
- South Africa
- Taiwan
- Tanzania
- Thailand
- Uganda
- United Kingdom
- United States
- Vietnam

Additionally, anecdotal evidence for acid attacks exists in other regions of the world such as South America, Central, and North Africa, the Middle East, and Central Asia. However, South Asian countries maintain the highest incidence of acid attacks.

Police in the United Kingdom have noted that many victims are afraid to come forward to report attacks, meaning the true scale of the problem may be unknown.

== Gender ==
An accurate estimate of the gender ratio of victims and perpetrators is difficult to establish because many acid attacks are not reported or recorded by authorities. For example, a 2010 study in The Lancet noted that there are "no reliable statistics" on the prevalence of acid attacks in Pakistan.

A 2007 literature review analyzed 24 studies in 13 countries over the past 40 years, covering 771 cases. According to the London-based charity Acid Survivors Trust International, 80% of acid attacks are on women, and acid assaults are grossly under-estimated. In some regions, assaults perpetrated on female victims by males are often driven by the mentality "If I can't have you, no one shall."

In Bangladesh, throwing acid has been labeled as a "gender crime", as there is a dominance of female victims who are assaulted by males in the country, for the reason of refusing to marry, or refusing sexual advances.

In Jamaica, women throwing acid on other women in relation to fights over male partners is a common cause. In the UK, the majority of victims are men, and many of these attacks are related to gang violence.

In India, a female victim was attacked with a knife twice, but no criminal charges were filed against the suspect. The victim was only given police aid after being hospitalized following an acid attack, raising questions of police apathy in dealing with cases of harassment.

Another factor that puts victims at increased risk for an acid assault is their socioeconomic status, as those living in poverty are more likely to be attacked. As of 2013, the three nations with the most noted incidence of acid attacks – Bangladesh, India, and Cambodia – were ranked 75th, 101st, and 104th, respectively, out of 136 countries on the Global Gender Gap Index, a scale that measures equality in opportunities between men and women in nations.

== Prevention ==
Research has prompted many solutions to the increasing incidence of acid attacks in the world. Bangladesh, whose rates of attack have been decreasing, is a model for many countries, and they follow Bangladesh's lead in many legislative reforms. However, several reports highlighted the need for an increased, legal role of NGOs to offer rehabilitation support to acid survivors. Additionally, nearly all research stressed the need for stricter regulation of acid sales to combat this social issue.

=== Role of NGOs ===
Many non-governmental organizations (NGOs) have been formed in the areas with the highest occurrence of acid attacks to combat such attacks. Bangladesh has its Acid Survivors Foundation, which offers acid victims legal, medical, counseling, and monetary assistance in rebuilding their lives. Similar institutions exist in Uganda, which has its own Acid Survivors Foundation, and in Cambodia which uses the help of Cambodian Acid Survivors Charity. NGOs provide rehabilitation services for survivors while acting as advocates for social reform, hoping to increase support and awareness for acid assault.

In Bangladesh, the Acid Survivors Foundation, Nairpokkho, Action Aid, and the Bangladesh Rural Advancement Committee's Community Empowerment & Strengthening Local Institutions Programme assist survivors. The Depilex Smileagain Foundation and The Acid Survivors Foundation in Pakistan operates in Islamabad, offering medical, psychological, and rehabilitation support. The Acid Survivors Foundation in Uganda operates in Kampala and provides counseling and rehabilitation treatment to victims and their families. The LICADHO, the Association of the Blind in Cambodia, and the Cambodian Acid Survivors Charity assist survivors of acid attacks. The Acid Survivors Foundation India operates from different centres with national headquarters at Kolkata and chapters at Delhi and Mumbai.

Acid Survivors Trust International (UK registered charity no. 1079290) provides specialist support to its sister organizations in Africa and Asia. Acid Survivors Trust International is the only international organisation whose sole purpose is to end acid violence. The organisation was founded in 2002 and now works with a network of six Acid Survivors Foundations in Bangladesh, Cambodia, India, Nepal, Pakistan, and Uganda that it has helped to form. Acid Survivors Trust International has helped to provide medical expertise and training to partners, raised valuable funds to support survivors of acid attacks and helped change laws. A key role for ASTI is to raise awareness of acid violence to an international audience so that increased pressure can be applied to governments to introduce stricter controls on the sale and purchase of acid.

Indian acid attack survivor Shirin Juwaley founded the Palash Foundation to help other survivors with psychosocial rehabilitation. She also spearheads research into social norms of beauty and speaks publicly as an advocate for the empowerment of all victims of disfigurement and discrimination. In 2011, the principal of an Indian college refused to have Juwaley speak at her school for fear that Juwaley's story of being attacked by her husband would make students "become scared of marriage".

=== Regulation of acid sales ===
A positive correlation has been observed between acid attacks and ease of acid purchase. Sulfuric, nitric, and hydrochloric acid are most commonly used and are all cheap and readily available in many instances. For example, often acid throwers can purchase a liter of concentrated sulfuric acid at motorbike mechanic shops for about 40 U.S. cents. Nitric acid costs around $1.50 per liter and is available for purchase at gold or jewelry shops, as polishers generally use it to purify gold and metals. Hydrochloric acid is also used for polishing jewelry, and for making soy sauce, cosmetics, traditional medicine, and amphetamine drugs.

Due to such ease of access, many organizations call for a stricter regulation on the acid economy. Specific actions include required licenses for all acid traders, a ban on concentrated acid in certain areas, and an enhanced system of monitoring for acid sales, such as the need to document all transactions involving acid. However, some scholars have warned that such stringent regulation may result in black market trading of acid, which law enforcements must keep in mind.

== By region ==
=== Africa ===
High incidence of acid assaults has been reported in some African countries, including Nigeria, Uganda, and South Africa. Unlike occurrences in South Asia, acid attacks in these countries show less gender discrimination. In Uganda, 57% of acid assault victims were female and 43% were male. A study focusing on chemical burns in Nigeria revealed a reversal in findings: 60% of the acid attack patients were male while 40% were female. In both nations, younger individuals were more likely to suffer from an acid attack: the average age in the Nigeria study was 20.6 years, while Ugandan analysis shows 59% of survivors were 19–34 years of age.

Motivation for acid assault in these African countries is similar to that of Cambodia. Relationship conflicts caused 35% of acid attacks in Uganda in 1985–2011, followed by property conflicts at 8%, and business conflicts at 5%. Disaggregated data was not available in the Nigeria study, but they reported that 71% of acid assaults resulted from an argument with either a jilted lover, family member, or business partner. As with the other nations, researchers believe these statistics to be under-representative of the actual scope and magnitude of acid attacks in African nations.

In August 2013, two Jewish women volunteer teachers – Katie Gee and Kirstie Trup from the UK – were injured by an acid attack by men on a moped near Stone Town in Tanzania.

A few cases also occurred in Ethiopia and Nigeria.

=== Americas ===
==== Mexico ====
Drug cartels such as Los Zetas are known to use acid on civilians. For example, In the 2011 San Fernando massacre, Los Zetas members took away children from their mothers, and shot the rest of the civilians in a bus. The women were taken to a warehouse where many other women were held captive. Inside a dark room, the women were reportedly raped and beaten. Screams of the women and of the children being put in acid were also heard.

==== South America ====
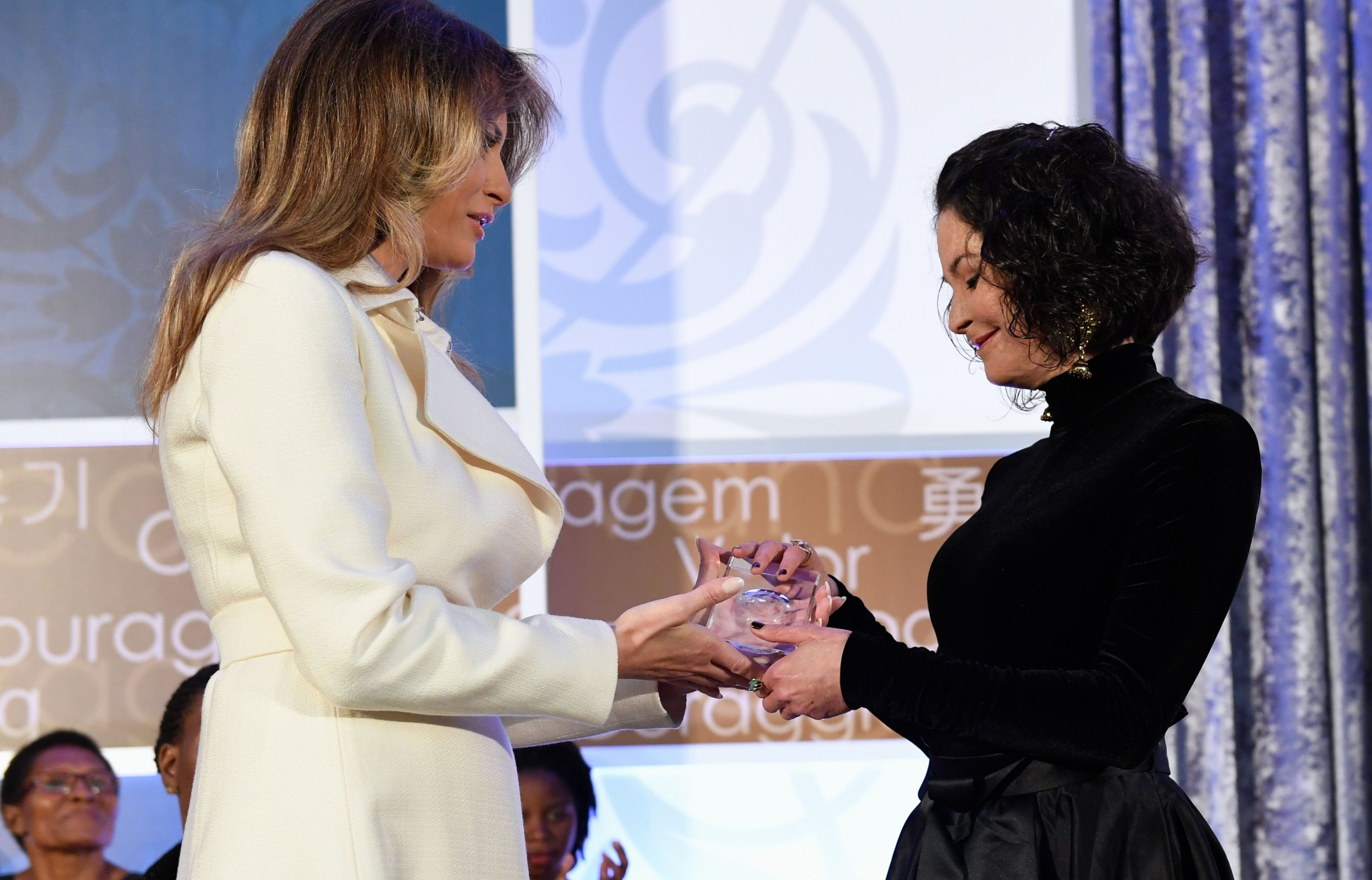
Natalia Ponce de León (right), survivor of a 2014 acid attack, receiving an award for her activism for other survivors

Though comprehensive statistics on acid attacks in South America are sparse, a recent study investigating acid assault in Bogotá, Colombia, provides some insight for this region. According to the article, the first identified survivor of acid violence in Bogotá was attacked in 1998. Since then reported cases have been increasing with time. The study also cited the Colombian Forensics Institute, which reported that 56 women complained of aggression by acid in 2010, 46 in 2011, and 16 during the first trimester of 2012. The average age of survivors was about 23 years old, but ranged from 13 to 41 years.

The study reported a male-to-female victim ratio of 1:30 for acid assault in Bogotá, Colombia, although recent reports show the ratio is closer to 1:1. Reasons behind these attacks usually stemmed from poor interpersonal relationships and domestic intolerance toward women. Moreover, female victims usually came from low socioeconomic classes and had low education. The authors state that the prevalence of acid attacks in other areas of South America remains unknown due to significant underreporting.

On 27 March 2014, a woman named Natalia Ponce de León was assaulted by Jonathan Vega, who threw a liter of sulfuric acid on her face and body. Vega, a former neighbor, was reported to have been "obsessed" with Ponce de León and had been making death threats against her after she turned down his proposal for a relationship. 24% of her body was severely burned as a result of the attack. Ponce de León has undergone 15 reconstruction surgeries on her face and body since the attack.

Three years before the attack took place, Colombia reported one of the highest rates of acid attacks per capita in the world. However, there was not an effective law in place until Ponce de León's campaign took off in the months after her attack. The new law, which is named after her, defines acid attacks as a specific crime and increases maximum sentences to 50 years in prison for convicted offenders. The law also seeks to provide victims with better state medical care including reconstructive surgery and psychological therapy. Ponce de León expressed hope that the new law would act as a deterrent against future attacks.

==== United States ====
Victor Riesel was a broadcast journalist, specializing in labor issues, who was attacked while leaving Lindy's restaurant in midtown Manhattan in the early morning of 5 April 1956. Riesel was left blind as a result. The attack was motivated by Riesel's reporting on the influence of organized crime on certain corrupt labor unions.

In 1959, American attorney Burt Pugach hired a man to throw lye (an alkaline rather than acid substance, but with similar corrosive effects) in the face of his ex-girlfriend Linda Riss. Riss suffered blindness and permanent scarring. Pugach served 14 years in prison for the incident.

Gabrielle White, a 22-year-old single mother living in Detroit, was attacked on 26 August 2006 by a stranger. She was left with third and fourth degree burns on her face, throat, and arms, leaving her blind and without one ear. She also miscarried her unborn child. A 25-year-old nursing student at Merritt College was the victim of an acid attack.

Esperanza Medina walked out of her Logan Square apartment in Chicago, Illinois, on a July morning in 2008, heading to her job as a social worker. Three teenagers poured cups of battery acid on the head of Medina, a 48-year-old mother of four.

On 30 August 2010, Bethany Storro, 28, of Vancouver, Washington, made national headlines after she claimed a stranger, whom she described as an African American woman, approached her on a walk and threw a cup of acid in her face, resulting in serious burns. Two weeks later, Storro admitted that she herself had lied about the attack and had, in fact, poured the acid on herself. She attributed her actions to untreated body dysmorphic disorder and pleaded guilty to lying to police, a misdemeanor. She also charged with three counts of second-degree theft in regard to donations she'd received to help aid her in her recovery but these charges were dropped after she repaid the money. It was reported in February 2013 that she spent one year in a mental health facility and had written a book, Facing the Truth.

In 2017, a 17-year-old girl was permanently scarred by an acid attack in Dallas.

In November 2019, a man in Milwaukee was attacked and sustained multiple burns. The attacker, Clifton Blackwell, was motivated by racism and anti-immigrant sentiments and was sentenced to 10 years in prison in 2022.

In April 2021, a student at Hofstra University suffered severe injuries to her face, arms, and throat from an acid attack carried out with battery acid. The assailant has been identified in 2026.

=== Asia ===
==== Afghanistan ====
Such attacks or threats against women who failed to wear hijab, dress "modestly", or otherwise threaten traditional norms have been reported in Afghanistan. In November 2008, Islamic extremists subjected girls to acid attacks for attending school.

==== Cambodia ====
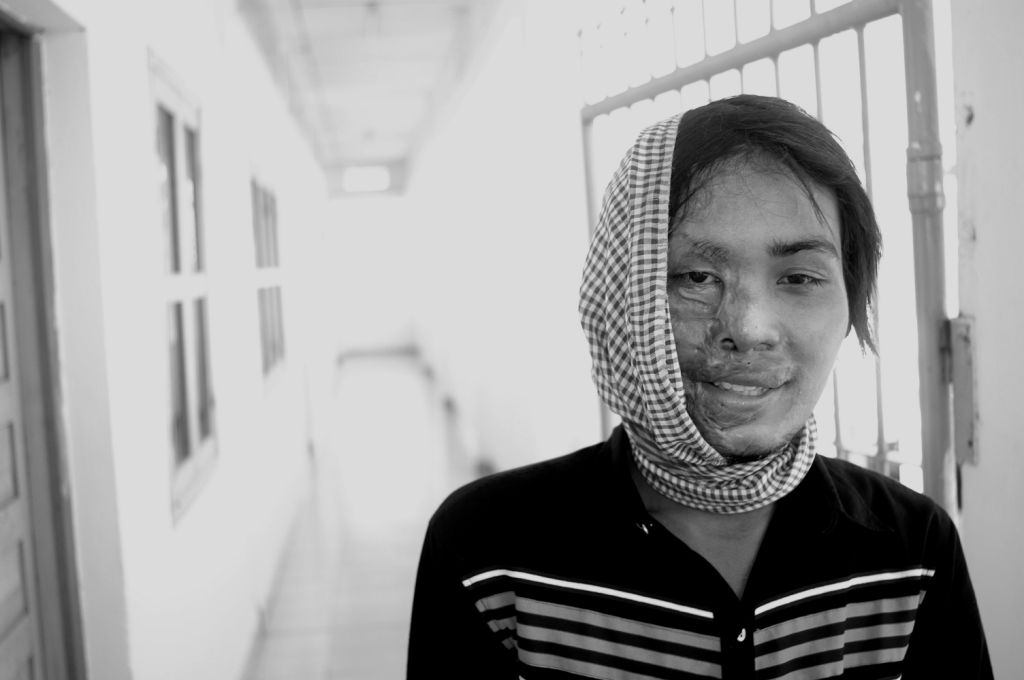
Acid attack victim in Cambodia

Recent studies on acid attacks in Cambodia found the victims were almost equally likely to be men or women (48.4% men, 51.6% women). As with India, rates of acid attacks in Cambodia have generally increased in past decades, with a high rate of 40 cases reported for 2000 that started the increasing trend. According to the Cambodian Acid Survivors Charity, 216 acid attacks were reported from 1985 to 2009, with 236 reported victims. Jealousy and hate is the biggest motivator for acid attacks in Cambodia, as 28% of attacks reported those emotions as the cause. Such assaults were not only perpetrated by men – some reports suggest women attack other women occur more frequently than men do. Such incidents usually occur between a husband's wife and mistress to attain power and socioeconomic security.

A particularly high-profile case of this nature was the attack on Cambodian teenager Tat Marina in 1999, allegedly carried out by the jealous wife of a government official (the incident prompted a rash of copycat crimes that year, raising the number from seven in 1998 to 40 in 1999). One-third of the victims are bystanders. In Cambodia, there is only one support center that is aiming to help acid attack survivors. There they can receive medical and legal support.

==== Hong Kong ====
The Mong Kok acid attacks were incidents in 2008, 2009, and 2010 where plastic bottles filled with corrosive liquid (drain cleaner) were thrown onto shoppers on Sai Yeung Choi Street South, Hong Kong, a pedestrian street and popular shopping area. A reward, originally HK$100,000, for information about the perpetrator or perpetrators, was raised to HK$300,000 following the second incident, and cameras were to be installed in the area following the December incident. The third incident occurred the day the cameras were turned on. The fifth incident happened after Hong Kong government announced its new strategies against the incident. 130 people were injured in these attacks.

==== Iran ====
According to Afshin Molavi, in the early years of the revolution and following the mandating of the covering of hair by women in Iran, some women were threatened with acid attacks by Islamic vigilantes for failing to wear hijab.

Recently, acid assault in Iran has been met with increased sanctions. The Sharia code of qisas, or equivalence justice, required a caught perpetrator of acid violence to pay a fine and may be blinded with acid in both eyes. Under Iranian law, victims or their families can ask a court's permission to enact "qisas" either by taking the perpetrator's life in murder cases or inflicting an equivalent injury on his or her body. One victim, Ameneh Bahrami, sentenced her attacker to be blinded in 2008. However, as of 31 July 2011, she pardoned her attacker, thereby absolving Majid Movahedi of his crime and halting the retributive justice of Qisas.

In October 2014, a series of acid attacks on women occurred in the city of Isfahan, resulting in demonstrations and arrests of journalists who had covered the attacks. The attacks were thought by many Iranians to be the work of conservative Islamist vigilantes, but the Iranian government denies this.

Acid attack survivor Masoumeh Ataei, a vocal advocate for other victims of acid attacks, was named to the BBC 100 Women in 2015.

==== The Levant ====
In 1983, acid attacks were reported to be carried out by Mujama al-Islamiya against men and women who spoke out against the Mujama in the Islamic University of Gaza. Additional attacks by Mujama al-Islamiya were reported through 1986. During the First Intifada, Hamas and other Islamist factions conducted an organized intimidation of women to dress "modestly" or wear the hijab. Circulars were distributed specifying proper modest dress and behavior. Women who did not conform to these expectations, or to "morality expectations" of secular factions, were vulnerable to attacks which included pouring acid on their bodies, rock pelting, threats, and even rape. B'Tselem has also documented additional attacks with acid in specific attacks involving women in a collaboration context.

In 2006–07, as part of a wider campaign to enforce Islamist moral conduct, the al-Qaida affiliated "Suyuf al-Haq" (Swords of Righteousness) claimed to have thrown acid on the faces of "immodestly" dressed woman in Gaza and engaged in intimidation via threats. Following 2014 Israel–Gaza conflict Amnesty International has claimed that Hamas used acid during interrogations as a torture technique. Hamas denies this claim. In 2016, during a teacher's strike, unknown assailants hurled acid in the face of a striking Palestinian teacher in Hebron.

There have also been recorded incidents of acid use against Israelis. In December 2014, a Palestinian hurled acid into a car containing a Jewish family of six and a hitchhiker at a checkpoint between Beitar Illit and Husan in the West Bank, causing serious face injuries to the father and lightly injuring other occupants, including children. In September 2008 a Palestinian woman carried out two separate acid attacks against soldiers at Huwwara checkpoint, blinding a soldier in one eye.

Moshe Hirsch was the leader of the anti-Zionist Neturei Karta group in Jerusalem. Hirsch had one glass eye due to an injury sustained when someone threw acid in his face. According to his cousin, journalist Abraham Rabinovich, the incident had no link with Hirsch's political activities but was connected to a real estate dispute.

==== South Asia ====
In South Asia, acid attacks have been used by people as a form of revenge for refusal of sexual advances, proposals of marriage, and demands for dowry. Scholars Taru Bahl and M. H. Syed say that land and property disputes are another leading cause.

===== India =====
Over 1,000 acid attacks were reported between 2017 and 2021 in India, according to a government report.

In India, 80 percent of the acid attacks target women, and independent agencies estimate that 60 percent go unreported, as many women are embarrassed and afraid to speak out against perpetrators - who in most cases are close to the victims. Survivors are also unlikely to pursue legal action due to pressure from family members. Acid attacks remain a severe form of gender based violence in India, with women being the most frequent targets. Motivated by revenge, jealousy, or rejection, these assaults leave survivors with lifelong physical and emotional scars. While 200–300 cases are reported annually, many more go unrecorded due to stigma and fear. The widespread availability of acid, despite legal restrictions, continues to fuel these crimes while conviction rates hover around just 10%, hindered by delayed investigations, poor evidence collection, and pressure on victims to settle or withdraw cases.

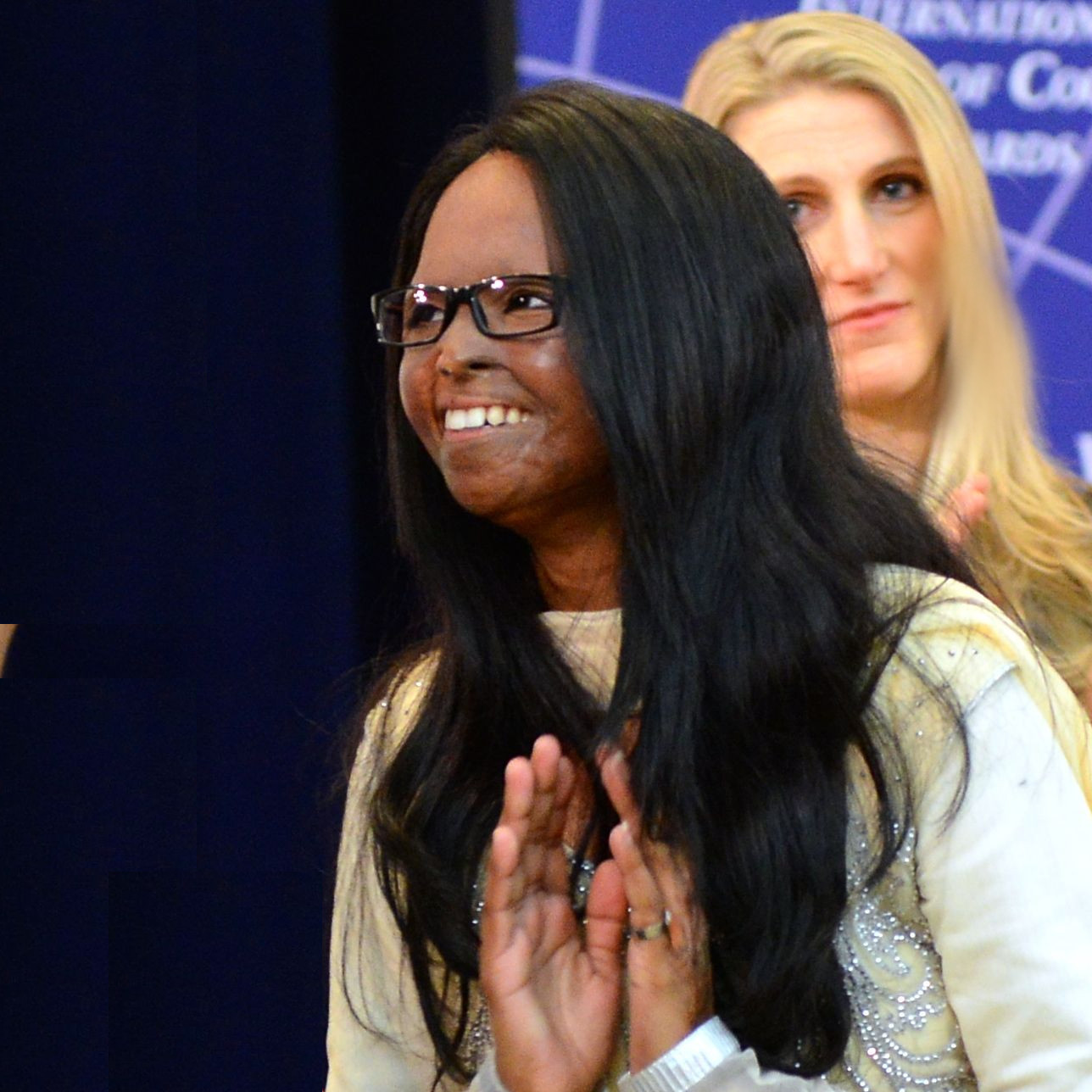
Laxmi Agarwal, Indian acid attack survivor and activist

Acid attacks in India, like Bangladesh, have a gendered aspect to them: analyses of news reports revealed at least 72% of reported attacks included at least one female victim. However, unlike Bangladesh, India's incidence rate of chemical assault has been increasing in the past decade, with a high 27 reported cases in 2010. Altogether, from January 2002 to October 2010, 153 cases of acid assault were reported in Indian print media while 174 judicial cases were reported for the year of 2000.

The motivation behind acid attacks in India mirrors those in Bangladesh: a study of Indian news reports from January 2002 to October 2010 uncovered that victims' rejection of sex or marriage proposals motivated attacks in 35% of the 110 news stories providing a motive for the attack. Notable cases are Sonali Mukherjee in 2003 and Laxmi Agarwal in 2005, whose experience on the ban of acid sales was portrayed in the Bollywood film Chhapaak.

Police in India were also accused of using acid on individuals, particularly on their eyes, blinding the victims. A well known such case is the Bhagalpur blindings, where police blinded 31 individuals under trial (or convicted criminals, according to some versions) by pouring acid into their eyes. The incident was widely discussed, debated, and acutely criticized by several human rights organizations. The Bhagalpur blinding case had made criminal jurisprudence history by becoming the first in which the Indian Supreme Court ordered compensation for violation of basic human rights.

===== Pakistan =====
In Pakistan, attacks are typically the work of husbands against their wives who have "dishonored" them. Statistics compiled by the Human Rights Commission of Pakistan (HRCP) show that 46 acid attacks occurred in Pakistan during 2004 and decreased with only 33 acid assaults reported for 2007. According to a New York Times article, in 2011 there were 150 acid attacks in Pakistan, up from 65 in 2010. However, estimates by the Human Rights Watch and the HRCP in 2006 cite the number of acid attack victims to be as high 40–70 per year. Motivation behind acid assaults range from marriage proposal rejections to religious fundamentalism. Acid attacks have been dropped by half in 2019

Acid attacks in Pakistan came to international attention after the release of a documentary by Sharmeen Obaid-Chinoy called Saving Face (2012). According to Shahnaz Bukhari, the majority of these attacks occur in the summer when acid is used extensively to soak certain seeds to induce germination. Various reasons have been given for such attacks, such as a woman dressing inappropriately or rejecting a proposal of marriage.

The first known instance of an acid attack occurred in East Pakistan (present-day Bangladesh) in 1967. According to the Acid Survivors Foundation, up to 150 attacks occur every year. The foundation reports that the attacks are often the result in an escalation of domestic abuse, and the majority of victims are female.

In 2019, the Acid Survivors Foundation Pakistan (ASFP) have said that the reported cases of acid attacks on women have dropped by around 50 per cent compared to the last five years.

===== Bangladesh =====
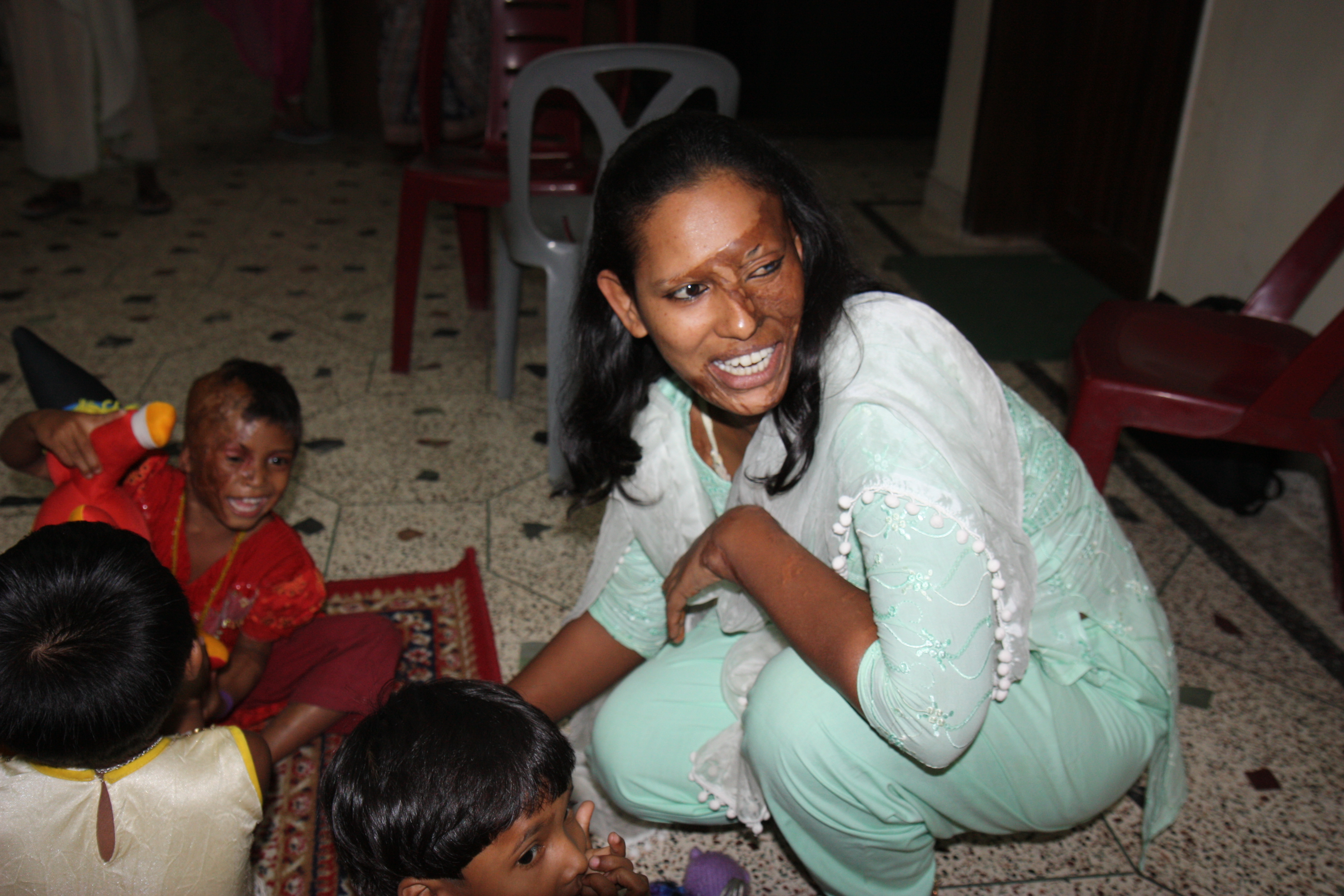
Acid attack victims in Bangladesh

According to the Acid Survivors Foundation in Bangladesh, the country has reported 3000 acid attack victims since 1999, peaking at 262 victims for the year of 2002. Rates have been steadily decreasing by 15% to 20% since 2002, with the amount of acid attack victims reported at 91 in Bangladesh as recently as 2011. Bangladesh acid attacks shows the most gendered discrimination, with one study citing a male to female victim ratio of 0.15:1 and another reporting that 82% of acid attack survivors in Bangladesh are women. Younger women were especially prone to attack, with a recent study reporting that 60% of acid assault survivors are between the ages of 10 and 19. According to Mridula Bandyopadhyay and Mahmuda Rahman Khan, it is a form of violence primarily targeted at women. They describe it as a relatively recent form of violence, with the earliest record in Bangladesh from 1983.

In societies like Bangladesh's, where women are typically treated as property and lacking agency, acid attacks are often perpetrated by men who become enraged after women rebuff their requests for relationship or marriage. One study showed that refusal of marriage proposals accounted for 55% of acid assaults, with abuse from a husband or other family member (18%), property disputes (11%), and refusal of sexual advances (2%) as other leading causes. Additionally, the use of acid attacks in dowry arguments has been reported in Bangladesh, with 15% of cases studied by the Acid Survivors Foundation citing dowry disputes as the motive. The chemical agents most commonly used to commit these attacks are hydrochloric acid and sulfuric acid.

==== Vietnam ====
Acid attacks are common in Vietnam. Most victims are female. While the issue in other Asian countries like Cambodia, India, and Pakistan is constantly monitored by domestic and transnational organizations, the situation in Vietnam is rather off the radar. Official statistics on acid attacks in the country are hard to record. Most of Vietnam's acid attack victims spend their lives isolated and ignored and also blamed for their condition. Kevin Hawkins, an American lawyer working for Vietnam-based VILAF law firm, notes the alarming prevalence of using acid in attacks, mostly for revenge and particularly in relation to failed romantic relationships or pursuits. The current Vietnamese penal code stipulates that those who use acid to attack their victims face a charge of "intentionally injuring others", rather than "murder", which thus fails to discourage potential offenders.

=== Europe ===
==== The Balkans ====
There has recently been a surge in high-profile, public acid attacks in Bulgaria and Greece.

==== Ireland ====
In 2017, a Chinese Irish woman was targeted in an attack in Blackrock, Dublin, causing facial scars and eye damage. Another foreign woman was suspected of ordering the attack.

In 2018, Lithuanian criminals threw acid at a Garda (police officer).

In April 2019 in Waterford, three teenagers were attacked by two others, who threw acid at them in a premeditated attack. All three victims suffered severe skin burns in the incident, and one, Tega Agberhiere, suffered severe injuries to his face and body and his eyesight was damaged. Nevertheless, the perpetrators merely got cautions.

On 13 June 2020, a man was attacked with acid in Garryowen, Limerick.

In December 2020, a woman threw acid at three women in a takeaway in Tallaght.

==== Russia ====
On 17 January 2013, Russian ballet dancer Sergei Filin was attacked with acid by an unknown assailant, who cornered him outside of his home in Moscow. He suffered third-degree burns to his face and neck. While it was initially reported that he was in danger of losing his eyesight, his physicians stated on 21 January 2013 that he would retain eyesight in one eye. Three men, including dancer Dmitrichenko, were subsequently sentenced to 4–10 years of prison each for orchestrating and executing the crime.

==== Ukraine ====
On 31 July 2018, Kateryna Handziuk, an anti-corruption activist and political advisor from the southern Ukrainian city of Kherson, was attacked with sulfuric acid outside her home by an unknown attacker. She died of her injuries on 3 November 2018. She was 33 years old.

==== United Kingdom ====
The UK at times has had one of the highest rates of acid attacks per capita in the world, though recent studies suggest that this is due to gang-related violence and possession offences, rather than traditional attacks found in lower middle-income countries, according to Acid Survivors Trust International (ASTI). NHS hospital figures record 144 assaults in 2011–2012 involving corrosive substances, which can include petrol, bleach, and kerosene. Six years earlier, 56 such episodes were noted. The official records for 2017–2018 shows 150 patients in the UK admitted to hospital for "Assault by corrosive substance". In 2016, the Metropolitan Police in London recorded 454 attacks involving corrosive fluids in the city, with 261 in the previous year, indicating a rise of 36%. A rise of 30% was also recorded in the UK as a whole. Between 2005–2006 and 2011–2012 the number of assaults involving acid throwing and other corrosive substances tripled in England, official records show. According to London's Metropolitan Police, 2017 was the worst year for acid attacks in London, with 465 attacks recorded, up from 395 the previous year and 255 in 2015. Acid attacks in London continued to rise in 2017. In July 2017, the BBC's George Mann reported that police statistics showed that: "Assaults involving corrosive substances have more than doubled in England since 2012. The vast majority of cases were in London." According to Time magazine, motives included organized crime, revenge, and domestic violence. According to Newham police, there is no trend of using acid in hate crimes.

According to data London's Metropolitan Police, a demographic breakdown of known suspects in London attacks for the period (2002–2016) showed European descent/Whites comprising 32% of suspects, Black Caribbeans 38%, and Asian 6%. Victims for the same period were 45% European descent/White, 25% Black Caribbeans, and 19% Asian. Of the total population, Whites constitute 60%, Blacks 13%, and Asians 18% as per the 2011 census of London. Known suspects were overwhelmingly male: 77% of known suspects were male and just 2% of suspects female. Four out of five victims in 2016 were male. In January 2018, CNN reported that acid attacks in London increased six-fold between 2012 and 2017 and that 71% of attackers and 72% of victims were male.

On 3 October 2017, the UK government announced that sales of acids to under 18s would be banned.

Mark van Dongen chose to undergo euthanasia months after he was attacked by his ex-girlfriend Berlinah Wallace during the early hours of 23 September 2015. He was left paralysed, scarred, had his lower left leg amputated, and lost the sight in his left eye, and most of the sight in his right eye, following the incident. Wallace was found guilty of "throwing a corrosive substance with intent" and received a life sentence with a minimum term of 12 years.

In April 2017, a man named Arthur Collins, the ex-boyfriend of Ferne McCann, threw acid inside a nightclub across terrified clubbers in east London forcing a mass evacuation of 600 partygoers flooding into the street. 22 people were injured in the attack. Collins was sentenced to 20 years for the attack. Another similar attack is the 2017 Beckton acid attack. Katie Piper was also attacked in 2008 with acid by her ex-boyfriend Daniel Lynch and an accomplice Stefan Sylvestre.

In April 2019, a teenage girl, 13, and a woman, 63, were attacked by a man driving a white car, who poured sulphuric acid on them in Thornton Heath, South London.

The UK has subsequently banned possession of sulphuric acid above 15% concentration without a licence and incidents of acid attacks have dropped substantially.

On 31 January 2024, nine people, including three police officers, were hospitalised after Abdul Shakoor Ezedi threw an alkaline solution on a car in Clapham, south west London.

== History ==
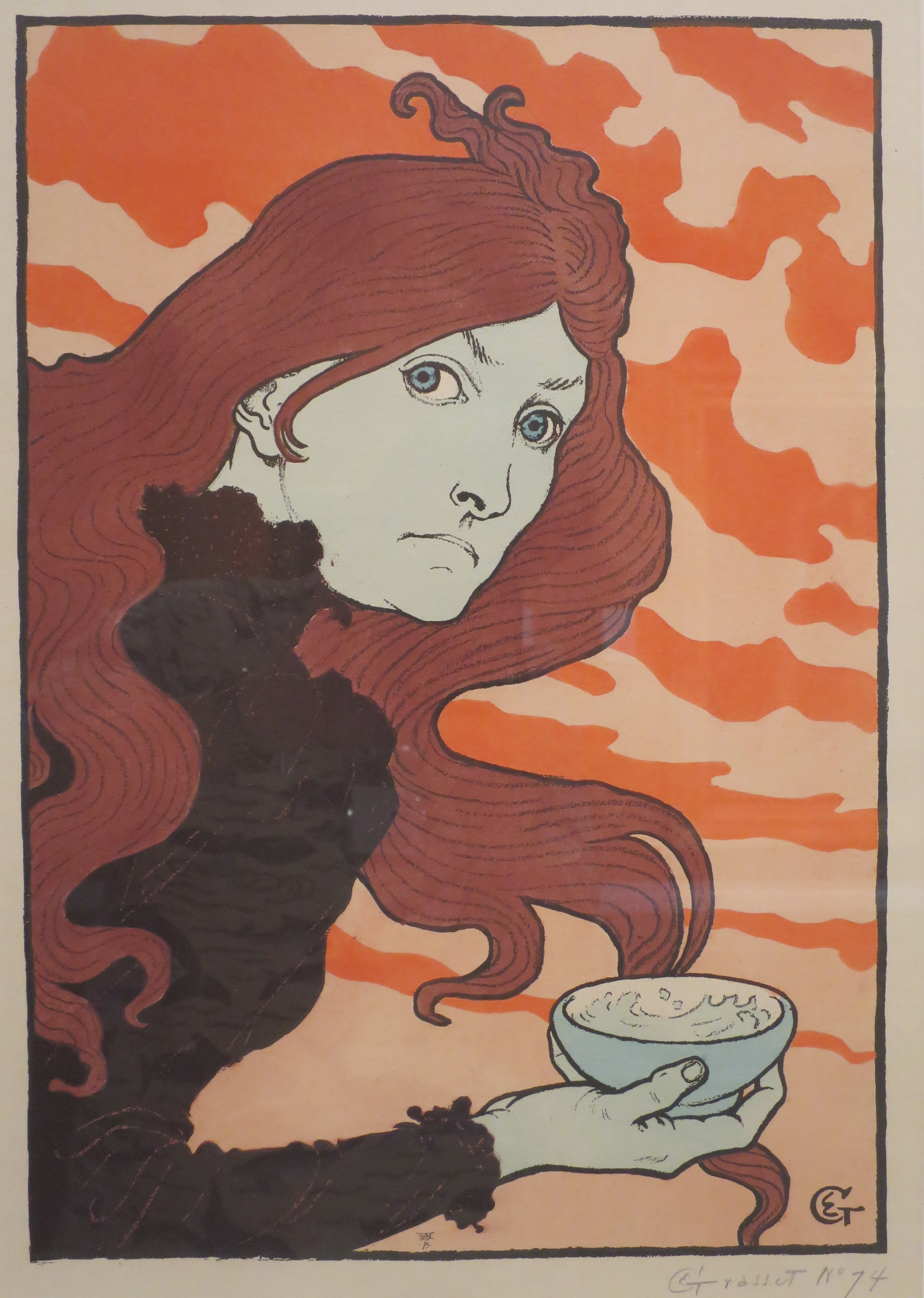
"La Vitrioleuse" (The Acid-Thrower, Eugène Grasset, c. 1894)

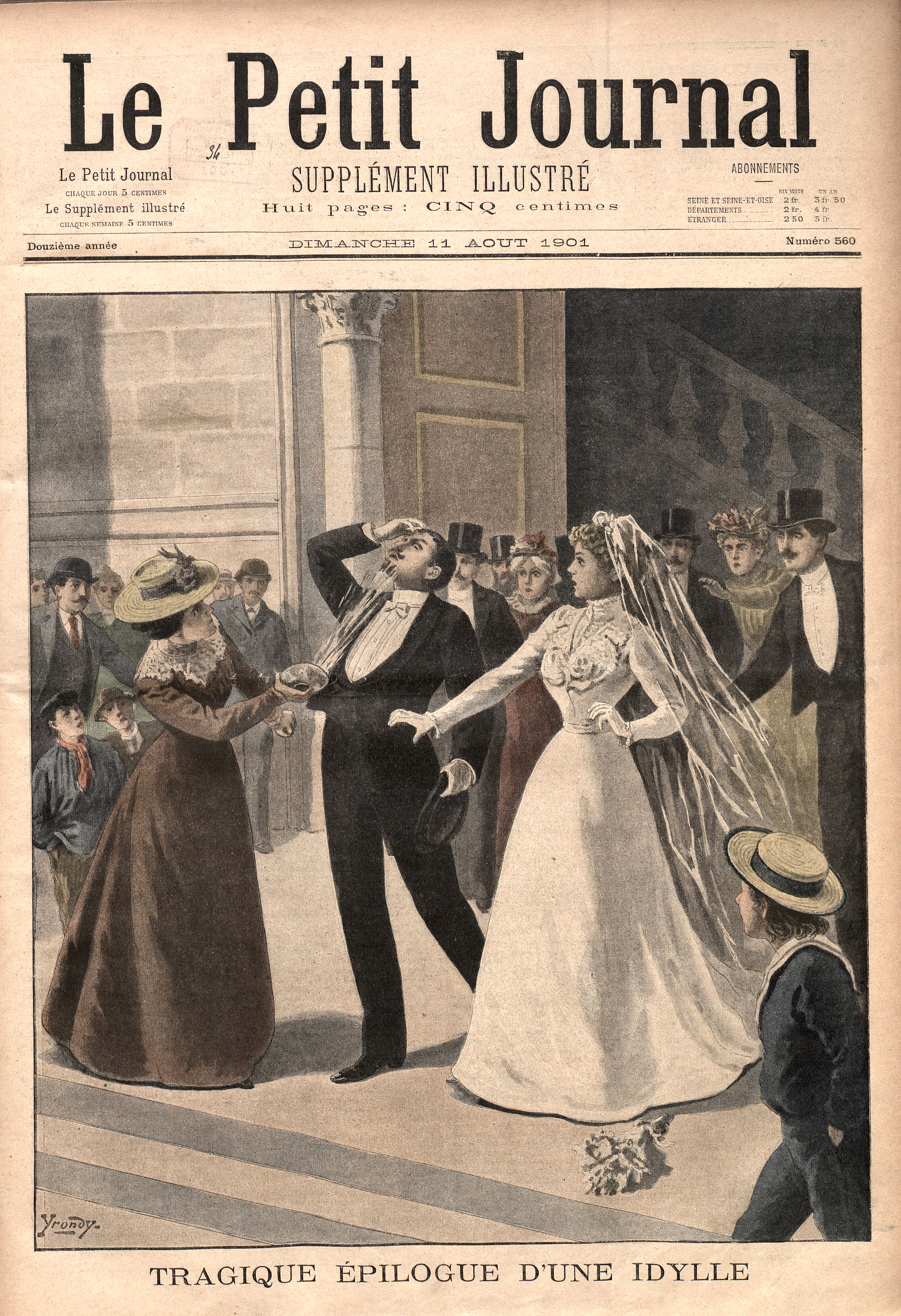
Tragique épilogue d'une idylle: Le Petit Journal cover of 1901, showing a woman throwing acid in the face of a man leaving his wedding.

Acids have been used in metallurgy and for etching since ancient times. The rhetorical and theatrical term "La Vitrioleuse" was coined in France after a "wave of vitriolage" occurred according to the popular press where, in 1879, 16 cases of vitriol attacks were widely reported as crimes of passion perpetrated predominantly by women against other women. Much was made of the idea that women, no matter how few, had employed such violent means to an end. On 17 October 1915, acid was fatally thrown on Prince Leopold Clement of Saxe-Coburg and Gotha, heir to the House of Koháry, by his distraught mistress, Camilla Rybicka, who then killed herself. Sensationalizing such incidents made for lucrative newspaper sales. Similarly, multiple acid attacks were reported in the UK in the nineteenth century and the first half of the twentieth century. Again, these were seen as a crime carried out by women, although in practice perpetrators were as likely to be male as female.

The use of acid as a weapon began to rise in many developing nations, specifically those in South Asia. The first recorded acid attacks in South Asia occurred in Bangladesh in 1967, India in 1982, and Cambodia in 1993. Since then, research has witnessed an increase in the quantity and severity of acid attacks in the region. However, this can be traced to significant underreporting in the 1980s and 1990s, along with a general lack of research on this phenomenon during that period.

Research shows acid attacks increasing in many developing nations, with the exception of Bangladesh which has observed a decrease in incidence in the past few years.

== Legislation ==
Many countries have begun pushing for legislation addressing acid attacks, and a few have recently employed new laws against this crime. Under the Qisas law of Pakistan, the perpetrator may suffer the same fate as the victim, and may be punished by having drops of acid placed in their eyes. This law is not binding and is rarely enforced according to a report in The New York Times. In Pakistan, the Lower House of Parliament unanimously passed the Acid Control and Acid Crime Prevention Bill on 10 May 2011. As punishment, according to the bill individuals held responsible for acid attacks face harsh fines and life in prison. However, the country with the most specific, effective legislation against acid attacks is Bangladesh, and such legal action has resulted in a steady 20–30% decrease in acid violence for the past few years. In 2013, India introduced an amendment to the Indian Penal Code through the Criminal Law (Amendment) Act, 2013, making acid attacks a specific offence with a punishment of imprisonment not less than 10 years and which can extend to life imprisonment and with fine.

=== India ===
India's top court ruled that authorities must regulate the sale of acid. The Supreme Court's ruling on 16 July 2013, came after an incident in which four sisters suffered severe burns after being attacked with acid by two men on a motorbike. Acid which is designed to clean rusted tools is often used in the attacks can be bought across the counter. But the judges said the buyer of such acids should in future have to provide a photo identity card to any retailer when they make a purchase. The retailers must register the name and address of the buyer. In 2013, section 326 A of Indian Penal Code was enacted by the Indian Parliament to ensure enhanced punishment for acid throwing.

=== Bangladesh ===
In 2002, Bangladesh introduced the death penalty for acid attacks and laws strictly controlling the sale, use, storage, and international trade of acids. The acids are used in traditional trades carving marble nameplates, conch bangles, goldsmiths, tanneries, and other industries, which have largely failed to comply with the legislation. Salma Ali of the Bangladesh National Women Lawyers' Association derided these laws as ineffective. The names of these laws are the Acid Crime Control Act (ACCA) and the Acid Control Act (ACA), respectively.

The ACCA directly impacts the criminal aspect of acid attacks, and allows for the death penalty or a level of punishment corresponding to the area of the body affected. If the attack results in a loss of hearing or sight or damages the victim's face, breasts, or sex organs then the perpetrator faces either the death penalty or life sentencing. If any other part of the body is maimed, then the criminal faces 7–14 years of imprisonment in addition to a fine of US$700. Additionally, throwing or attempting to throw acid without causing any physical or mental harm is punishable by this law and could result in a prison term of 3–7 years along with a US$700 fine. Furthermore, conspirators that aid in such attacks assume the same liability as those actually committing the crime.

The ACA regulates the sale, usage, and storing of acid in Bangladesh through the creation of the National Acid Control Council (NACC). The law requires that the NACC implement policies regarding the trade, misuse, and disposal of acid, while also undertaking initiatives that raise awareness about the dangers of acid and improve victim treatment and rehabilitation. The ACA calls for district-level committees responsible for enacting local measures that enforce and further regulate acid use in towns and cities.

=== Pakistan ===
Under the Qisas (eye-for-an-eye) law of Pakistan, the perpetrator could suffer the same fate as the victim, if the victim or the victim's guardian chooses. The perpetrator may be punished by having drops of acid placed in their eyes.

Section 336B of Pakistan Penal Code states: "Whoever causes hurt by corrosive substance shall be punished with imprisonment for life or imprisonment of either description which shall not be less than fourteen years and a minimum fine of one million rupees." Additionally, section 299 defines Qisas and states: "Qisas means punishment by causing similar hurt at the same part of the body of the convict as he has caused to the victim or by causing his death if he has committed qatl-iamd (intentional manslaughter) in exercise of the right of the victim or a Wali (the guardian of the victim)."

=== United Kingdom ===
After a spate of attacks in London in 2017, the Home Office said it would consider changes in laws and measures regarding sales of acid and changes in prosecution and sentencing guidelines. As of 2017, it is unlawful to carry acid with the intent to cause harm. Attacks are prosecuted as acts of actual bodily harm and grievous bodily harm. Three quarters of police investigations do not end in prosecution, either because the attacker could not be found, or because the victim is unwilling to press charges. According to ASTI, of the 2,078 acid attack crimes recorded for the years 2011–2016 in UK, only 414 of those crimes resulted in charges being brought. Most acid attack crimes happened in London, where over 1,200 cases were recorded over the past five years. From 2011 to 2016 there were 1,464 crimes involving acid or corrosive substance. Northumbria recorded the second highest with 109 recorded attacks, Cambridgeshire had 69 attacks, Hertfordshire 67, Greater Manchester 57, and Humberside 52.

The Offensive Weapons Act 2019 made provisions for crimes related to acid attacks, including bringing in greater regulation of the sale of corrosive products and making it an offence to carry a corrosive substance in a public place without good reason.

== Portrayals in media ==
- A fake acid attack between rivals for a husband appears in Cecil B. DeMille's film Why Change Your Wife? (1920).
- In "The Adventure of the Illustrious Client" by Sir Arthur Conan Doyle, the villainous Baron Adelbert Gruner has oil of vitriol thrown in his face by a wronged former mistress, disfiguring him. She is prosecuted for this but given the minimum sentence due to extenuating circumstances. In the television adaptation starring Jeremy Brett as Sherlock Holmes, the former mistress, Kitty Winter, reveals that she herself is the victim of an acid attack perpetrated by Gruner.
- DC Comics supervillain Two-Face's origin stories feature half his face disfigured with acid.
- In the 1982 slasher movie Hospital Massacre, a deranged killer lures a janitor into a room with a sink full of acid. The killer then ambushes him and pushes his face into the substance, killing him to remove any witnesses of a murder the janitor discovered minutes earlier.
- The 1997 Philippine drama series Mula sa Puso and its 2011 remake featured Magdalena "Magda", a character whose face was disfigured by an acid attack committed by the main antagonist of the series, Selina Pereira-Matias.
- In the 2002 series of He-Man and the Masters of the Universe, Skeletor owes his namesake skeletal face to an acid attack.
- In 2013 American Horror Story Coven has an acid attack in episode 3. A witch hunter throws acid in Cordelia Fox's eyes rendering her blind, but granting her visions.
- Saving Face – A 2012 documentary film by Sharmeen Obaid Chinoy and Daniel Junge that follows Pakistani/British plastic surgeon Dr. Mohammad Jawad to his native Pakistan to aid women who were victims of acid attacks, and examines the Pakistani parliament's exercise in banning the act of acid burning. The film won the 2012 Academy Award for best Documentary Short.
- In Emmerdale, one of the characters, Ross Barton, is a victim of an acid attack (as depicted in a 2018 episode). The actor who portrayed Ross Barton has said that it was his idea that the character should be a victim of an acid attack, as he wanted to create an awareness campaign about this problem.
- Surkh Chandni – A 2019 Pakistani television series directed by Shahid Shafaat that follows the story of a girl who survived an acid attack and the harshness of society she has to face there after.
- Dirty God – a 2019 English film starring Vicky Knight as an acid attack victim seeking justice and healing. Knight is a real burn victim, although from a domestic fire rather than an acid attack.
- Infinite Jest – a 1996 novel featuring a scene in which Joelle Van Dyne's mother tries to throw acid in her husband's face after he confesses his love for their daughter, Joelle, but instead misses and hits her.
- Uyare – a 2019 Indian Malayalam-language film focuses on an aspiring pilot, who is a victim of an acid attack and how the situation changes around her.
- Chhapaak – a 2020 Indian Hindi-language film based on the life of Laxmi Agarwal, an acid attack survivor.
- In Bergen – a 2022 biopic about Turkish singer Bergen, the acid attack that left her blind in one eye is depicted.
- In Coronation Street in 2023, two characters, Daisy Midgeley and Ryan Connor are victims of an acid attack when Daisy's stalker, Justin attacks her with acid. Ryan jumps in between Daisy and Justin and receives more severe burns to his face while Daisy only receives moderate burns on her body.
- In Top Boy in 2019, a minor character is depicted being wrestled to the ground and doused with a bottle of unknown acid on his face in a gang attack orchestrated by a main character, Jamie. The victim is then shown at the end of the season wearing an eyepatch with burns on his face. He was also seen in the following season, also with an eyepatch on his face, implying that the acid attack had permanently blinded the victim in one eye.
- In 2023 Indian television series Jyoti... Umeedon Se Sajee tells about the story of an hardworking and aspirational women named, Jyoti whose life turns upside down as she is being turned into a victim of acid attack.
- Acid – a 2023 Indian Malayalam-language film about Ruhana, who survives an acid attack on her face and overcomes this tragedy through her determination and grit.

== Terms ==
Vitriolage is the deliberate splashing of a person or object with acid, also known as vitriol, in order to deface or kill. A female who engages in such an act is known as a vitrioleuse. There are instances of this act throughout history and in modern times, often in places where honor killings are also common.

== See also ==
- Caste system
- Dowry death
- Femicide
- Islam and domestic violence
- Sangita Magar
- Sati
- Zelyonka attack
- Category:Acid attack victims
