= Control of Poisons and Explosives Precursors Regulations 2023 =

Statutory instrument of the United Kingdom

Control of Explosives Precursors and Poisons Regulations 2023
- Statutory Instrument
- Parliament of the United Kingdom
- Citation: SI 2003/63

Dates
- Made: 23 January 2023
- Laid before Parliament: 23 January 2023
- Commencement: 1 October 2023

Other legislation
- Made under: Poisons Act 1972

Text of statute as originally enacted

Text of the Control of Poisons and Explosives Precursors Regulations 2023 as in force today (including any amendments) within the United Kingdom, from legislation.gov.uk.

The Control of Explosives Precursors and Poisons Regulations 2023 (SI 2003/63) is a statutory instrument of the United Kingdom. It restricts the sale of a number of chemicals that are either poisons or explosives precursors without a valid Explosives Precursors and Poisons Licence.

Additionally it also regulates the possession of poisons and explosive precursors. Since 3 March 2016 the possession and use of such chemicals has been regulated.

It references the Poisons Act 1972 and the Control of Poisons and Explosives Precursors Regulations 2015 (SI 2015/966).

== Regulated explosives precursors ==
Currently in the UK the following substances are regulated as explosives precursors:

- Ammonium nitrate
- Hexamine
- Hydrochloric acid
- Hydrogen peroxide
- Nitromethane
- Nitric acid
- Phosphoric acid
- Potassium chlorate
- Potassium perchlorate
- Sodium chlorate
- Sodium perchlorate
- Sulfuric acid

== Reportable explosives precursors ==
The following substances are reportable explosives precursors:

- Acetone
- Aluminium powder
- Calcium nitrate
- Calcium ammonium nitrate
- Magnesium nitrate hexahydrate
- Magnesium powder
- Potassium nitrate
- Sodium nitrate
- Sulfur
