= Masoumeh Ataei =

Iranian acid attack victim, model, and activist

- Born: 1982 or 1983 (age 42–43); Tehran, Iran
- Occupations: acid attack survivor; artist; model; activist
- Honors: BBC 100 Women 2015

Masoumeh Ataei is an Iranian acid attack survivor, model, artist, and activist who has been internationally recognized for her resilience. She was named to the BBC 100 Women list in 2015.

== Biography ==
She divorced her husband in 2008 due to domestic abuse, and her husband began to do drugs following the divorce. On September 3, 2010, she took her son Arian to see her ex-father-in-law. He asked her to close her eyes as he was giving a gift to Arian. Then she felt severe burning. After rushing to a hospital, she found she had been attacked with acid. She went on several news tours, and was once invited to the President of Iran's office in 2011.

A play about her life and experience was put on in 2013 in Vancouver. In 2015, she was named to the BBC 100 Women list.

She has been an outspoken advocate for acid attack survivors and against acid attacks. In 2017, she joined in a demand for the freedom of fellow anti-acid-attack activist Ali Shariati, making a very emotional post on her Instagram stating "I will be the sound of your cry with scars burned by acid and eyes that no longer see". She has also worked as an art teacher. She is a board member of the Acid Victims Assistance Association.

Several of her sculptures and bowls were presented at the Ashianeh gallery in Tehran in 2018. In 2019, she was featured in another art exhibition: both a portrait of her by Iranian artist and fellow acid-attack survivor Mohsen Mortazavi and multiple of her own pieces of art were featured at the Reza Abbasi Museum in Tehran.

After being discovered by costume designer Ameneh Khademi at a meeting of the Acid Victims Association, she has become a well-known model in Tehran, modeling for fashion workshops, fashion shows, and photos, including Reuters. She was hesitant at first, but has grown more and more accustomed to it. In 2021, she became the first acid attack survivor to model products for an Iranian brand.

She has undergone 38 operations in an attempt to bring back her eyesight, including in the United States and in Tehran.
