= Latet =

Israeli nonprofit aid organization

- לתת
- Formation: 1996; 30 years ago
- Founder: Gilles Darmon
- Type: Non-profit
- Headquarters: Israel
- Services: Providing for basic needs, food security, and educational programs
- Budget: $30 million annually
- Volunteers: 19,000+

Latet (Hebrew: לתת, lit. to give) is an Israeli nonprofit aid organization that was founded in 1996 by Gilles Darmon, then a new immigrant from France. Acting as an umbrella organization for 180 local NGOs across 105 communities in the country, it provides for the basic needs of populations living in poverty and facing nutritional insecurity. The organization operates a national food bank and runs several aid and educational programs. Among its core activities, Latet distributes $30 million worth of food annually to 60,000 families in need and 1,000 Holocaust survivors living in poverty.

== History ==
When it was established, in addition to combatting poverty in Israel, Latet specialized in sending emergency aid delegations and humanitarian assistance abroad following wars and natural disasters: Kosovo and Rwanda after the civil wars in 1997 and 1999, India after the earthquake in 1999, Sri Lanka after the tsunami in 2005 and Haiti following the earthquake in 2010.

== Organization's purpose ==
According to a 2016 official report by the Israeli National Insurance Institute, 462,000 families (that is 1,802,000 individuals) live in poverty in Israel, of which 838,500 are children. Furthermore, nearly 955,000 families live in food insecurity (18% of the general population). In its efforts to relieve poverty and alleviate food insecurity, Latet has developed an operating model that enables the annual distribution of $30 million worth of food to 60,000 families in need across the country.

Latet carries out numerous annual initiatives to raise awareness among the general public: public displays, food drives, and a national telethon. Moreover, the organization relies on more than 19,000 volunteers who annually join Latet's activities, providing 400,000 hours of voluntary service.

Latet considers the government to be the main factor responsible for reducing poverty, as does 75.6% of the general public, according to a public survey published in Latet's Alternative Poverty Report. The organization regularly lobbies the government to bring change to the national agenda. Latet publishes an annual Alternative Poverty Report which takes the human factor of poverty into account and organizes an annual conference discussing poverty.

== Areas of action ==
=== The nutritional security initiative ===
The nutritional security initiative consists of rescuing and distributing food nationwide. With three logistic centers located in the north, center and south of Israel, Latet is one of the leading food banks and operates as an umbrella organization for 180 local NGOs across 105 communities, providing them with food products on a regular basis. These local associations then redistribute the food to people in need. 60,000 families receive assistance from Latet every month. Every year, Latet rescues and distributes between $25-$30 million worth of food.

The organization primarily rescues and distributes dry food products (canned food, rice, pasta, oil, sugar, flour, and more) and over the past five years has also started distributing dairy products and poultry. The modus operandi of the organization relies on long-lasting partnerships with leading companies in the food industry (Osem, Strauss, Tnuva, Coca-Cola, Unilever, etc). Since 2015, Latet has been working in cooperation with the Manufacturers Association of Israel's Association of Food Industries to encourage, regulate and expand food rescue in Israel among food companies. This collaboration has led to more than 20 new food companies joining the food salvaging circle in 2016–2017. These partnerships have social (assist families in need), economical (save food destruction costs), and environmental (avoid food waste) advantages.

Along with the food rescue, food purchasing takes place regularly in order to provide all the necessary products for the basic food package Latet distributes.

=== Aid for Life – Holocaust survivors ===
According to the Foundation for the Benefit of Holocaust Victims in Israel, 45,000 out of the 189,000 Holocaust survivors living in Israel live below the poverty line. Latet's Aid for Life program was created in 2007 with the goal of giving direct assistance to Holocaust survivors in need. The program provides the most impoverished Holocaust survivors with a holistic aid package tailored to their needs:

- A monthly food box is delivered to the survivor's home every month and is built in cooperation with nutritionists to adapt to elderly people's needs.
- Ongoing social support: each survivor is partnered with an individual volunteer who visits him on a regular basis. Latet also hosts festive dinners for Jewish holidays and social events throughout the year. In 2018, 1,300 volunteers kept the survivors company on an ongoing basis and brought them to dozens of events that were organized across the country.
- Emergency Fund: the fund was created to supply medical and paramedical items and services such as eyeglasses, incontinence products, dental care, emergency alert systems, and household maintenance. These are expensive products most survivors in need cannot afford. The emergency fund helps them resolve issues quickly and allows the survivors to regain their independence.
- Home restorations: some survivors live in run-down apartments that often lack accessibility. This project has been implemented since 2014 to ensure survivors’ homes are safe and secure. The restorations are managed by Latet staff and led by a professional contractor, at no cost to the survivors. Within 4 years, the project has renovated 1,550 apartments, improving the survivors' quality of life and personal security.

=== Latet Youth organization ===
Latet Youth is an organization recognized by the Israeli Ministry of Education that is dedicated to the nurturing of Israeli teens as caring citizens guided by values of volunteering and mutual responsibility. The teenagers spend time visiting and volunteering in different places (schools, community centers, retirement homes, etc.). During the last year of the three-year program, the youth implement social micro-initiatives within their own communities, developing their entrepreneurial and leadership skills.

The youth organization operates nationwide and brings together 2,500 participants from all backgrounds. 40% of the participants are defined as "at-risk youth" and 70% come from a disadvantaged socioeconomic background. Every year, Latet Youth's members carry out 150 social micro-initiatives. Some of these initiatives have received national media coverage, like the "Thank You Day" and the "Gift Room at the Soroka Medical Center".

=== Advocacy and Awareness ===
The project's aim is to bring about change in Israel's national priorities and to raise social awareness about poverty and food insecurity. Year long, Latet is committed to carrying out various activities in order to fulfill this goal:

- Alternative Poverty Report: this is an annual report which sheds light on the most up-to-date trends in poverty and nutritional insecurity in Israel. The report is published by Latet in collaboration with the ERI research institute. This report is a multidimensional analysis of what poverty means and presents alternative numbers in contrast to the narrower definition of poverty by the National Insurance Institute of Israel.
- Poverty conference: this annual conference is one of the most prominent events related to poverty and social gaps, while discussing solutions for reducing poverty. The conference molds the public discourse and gathers associations' directors, academics, economists, politicians, private companies' directors, artists, etc.
- Public fundraising campaigns: twice a year, around the holidays (Rosh Hashanah and Passover), Latet runs extensive fundraising and awareness campaigns. As part of these activities, the organization organizes food drives in the largest supermarket chain Shufersal in order to collect food products from customers. In 2017, 36,500 food boxes (containing dozens of food products) were collected from the supermarket chain. For Rosh Hashanah, Latet holds an annual telethon on national television in partnership with leading live TV shows, like Master Chef Israel, during which the organization raises hundreds of thousands of Holiday meal for people in need.
- Large-scale public displays are held in important public places in order to raise the awareness of the general population to the poverty issue.

== Partnerships and impact on Israeli society ==
Latet is one of the most well-known organizations in Israel and has been recognized as a "Super Brand" by the Superbrands organization, along the Mossad and the IDF. 98% of Israelis know Latet (98% brand recognition and 52% brand recall).

90% of Latet's budget comes from Israeli society (general public, private sector and foundations) and 7% from abroad (foundations, federations and private donors). Some of Latet's largest supporters are UJA-Federation of New York, Jewish Federation of Greater Philadelphia, Jewish Federation of Greater Los Angeles, Fondation pour la Mémoire de la Shoah, and FSJU.
