= Mashav =

Foreign internship program in Israel

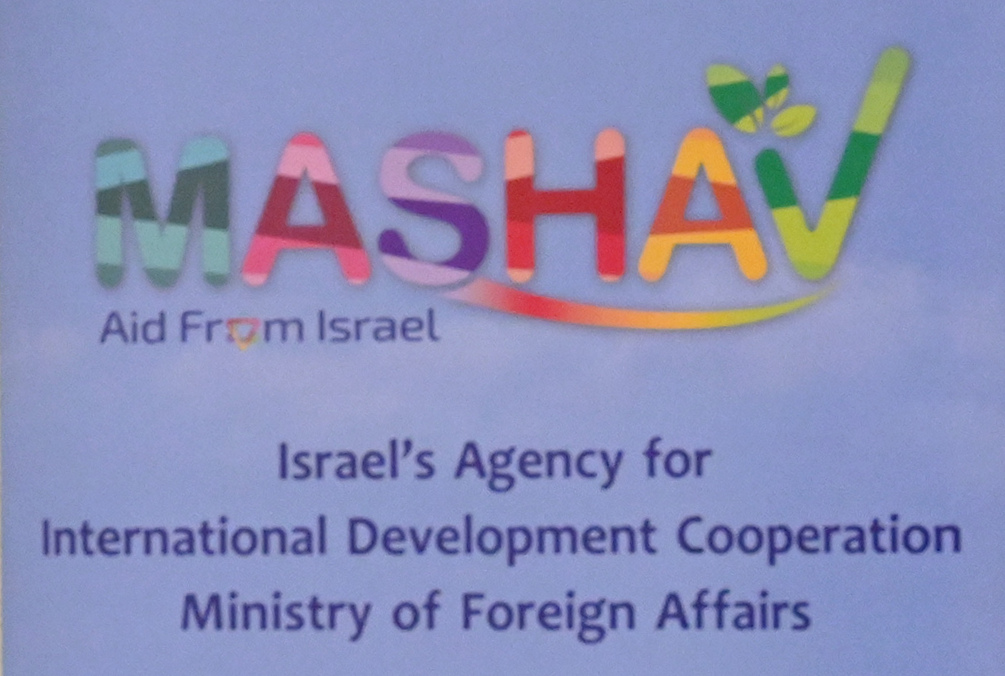

Mashav (Hebrew: מש"ב, romanized: MASHAV) is the Hebrew acronym for the Agency for International Development Cooperation (Hebrew: המרכז לשיתוף פעולה בינלאומי) in the Ministry of Foreign Affairs of Israel. Mashav is responsible for the design, coordination and implementation of the State of Israel's worldwide development and cooperation programs in developing countries. MASHAV believes that its greatest possible contribution to developing countries can be made in fields where Israel has relevant expertise accumulated during its own development experience as a young country facing similar challenges. MASHAV's development programs are conducted through workshops and training in the fields of agriculture, education and medicine and are funded jointly with multinational organizations such as the OAS, the Inter-American Development Bank, the UN development plan, UNESCO and the Food and Agriculture Organization. According to the OECD, 2020 official development assistance from Israel decreased by 1.9% to US$287.6 million.

== Background ==
Mashav was set up in the wake of the Bandung Conference of 1955, from which Israel had been excluded at the demand of Arab countries who threatened a boycott of the conference if Israel was invited. It was established on Golda Meir's initiative, in 1958, after her visit to Africa. Meir stated that it was the expression of an empathy with victims of oppression, discrimination and slavery, but the project also blended other goals, such as escaping ‘the Arab noose’ by overcoming the boycott imposed on it by Arab nations. In the 1960s it was also very active in assistance to agricultural development projects in South America.

Since its inception in late 1957, Mashav has striven to share with the rest of the developing world the know-how and technologies which provided the basis for Israel's own rapid development. Mashav started as a modest program, focused on grassroots-level human capacity building at a time when Israel itself was still very much a developing country. It has since blossomed into an extensive program of cooperation throughout the developing world, with the aim of promoting sustainable development and social equity.

MASHAV grew gradually and organically in response to repeated requests on the part of the peoples that freed themselves from the yoke of colonialism and were seeking practical and political means of ridding themselves of poverty, hunger and disease that was the heritage of that era.

Since its establishment, over 270,000 professionals from more than 132 countries have participated in Mashav's training programs. Mashav promotes the centrality of human resource enrichment and institutional capacity building in the development process – an approach which has attained global consensus, and implements this principle by offering professional training courses in Israel and in host countries and short and long-term professional consultations.

By 2010, Mashav had trained a quarter of a million students, predominantly African, from the developing world in education, health, science and agriculture, cooperating with over 140 countries. The expertise and technology acquired in cultivating areas such as deserts affected by water scarcity has underwritten many projects.

== India-Israel collaboration ==
Indian-Israeli relations
- India: Israel

Mashav has signed a Memorandum of understanding with India in April 2015 for the collaboration and knowledge transfer, under which several Indo-Israeli Centres of Excellence have been operationalised in several states, including the following in the state of Haryana:

1. Indo-Israeli Centre of Excellence for Animal Husbandary & Dairying, Hisar in Hisar district
2. Indo-Israeli Centre of Excellence for Vegetables, Gharaunda in Karnal district
3. Indo-Israeli Centre of Excellence for Citrus Fruits and Pomegranate, Mangiana in Sirsa district
4. Indo-Israeli Centre of Excellence for Bee-keeping, Ram Nagar in Kurukshetra district
5. Indo-Israeli Centre of Excellence for Mango, Ladwa in Kurukshetra district
6. Indo-Israeli Centre of Excellence for Floriculture, Sondhi in Jhajjar district

== See also ==
- IsraAid
- International Conference for Women Leaders
- Heroes for Life
