= Ann Skelton =

South African jurist

Ann Marie Skelton (born 13 July 1961) is a South African jurist and children's rights activist. She was the chairperson of the United Nations Committee on the Rights of the Child from 2023 - 2025. She is a professor of private law at the University of Pretoria, where she is UNESCO Chair in Education Law in Africa, and she also holds the Chair in Children's Rights in a Sustainable World at Leiden University.

An expert on child law, Skelton rose to prominence as a practicing human rights lawyer and advocate, first in non-profit organisations and then through the strategic litigation programme of the University of Pretoria's Centre for Child Law, which was formerly headed by Skelton. In addition, through the South African Law Reform Commission, she has played a significant role in post-apartheid child law reform in South Africa, including as chair of the committee that drafted the Child Justice Act of 2008.

== Academic and professional background ==
Skelton completed her BA and LLB at the University of Natal, graduating in 1981 and 1985 respectively. She worked as a public prosecutor for three years, from 1986 to 1988, and then was a director at Lawyers for Human Rights from 1988 to 1999. From 1999 to 2003, she was the national coordinator of the Child Justice Project, which was located under the South African government and funded by the United Nations (UN).

Returning to academia, Skelton completed her LLD at the University of Pretoria in 2005, with a dissertation on restorative justice in application to children. After that, she remained at the university, initially as coordinator for the Children's Litigation Project in the Centre for Child Law, a law clinic that conducts advocacy, research, and litigation related to child law. She was subsequently promoted to become overall director of the centre.

While she was director of the centre, in 2013, Skelton was appointed to hold the UNESCO Chair in Education Law in Africa, hosted by the University of Pretoria. She was appointed as a full professor in the university's Department of Private Law the following year. Her term as director of the Centre for Child Law ended at the end of 2018, but she retained her law chair at the university. In addition, in 2020/2021, she was the inaugural holder of the Rotating Honorary Chair in Enforcement of Children's Rights at Leiden University in the Netherlands, and the following year, on 1 October 2022, she took up the chair in Children's Rights in a Sustainable World, a permanent part-time position in Leiden's Department of Child Law.

== Scholarship and litigation ==
Skelton is rated a B1 researcher by the National Research Foundation, connoting international recognition in her field. She has published widely on restorative justice and on child law, particularly on children's rights, juvenile criminal justice, and education law.

Skelton is also an admitted advocate of the High Court of South Africa. As a pioneer of the Centre for Child Law's strategic litigation programme, she was involved in landmark child law cases and has argued at least a dozen times in the Constitutional Court of South Africa. Perhaps most prominently, Skelton, instructed by the Centre for Child Law, represented the Teddy Bear Clinic in Teddy Bear Clinic v Minister of Justice, which presented a successful challenge to statutory rape provisions of the Criminal Law (Sexual Offences and Related Matters) Amendment Act, 2007; the clinic argued, and the Constitutional Court agreed, that it was unconstitutional for the act to criminalise sex between two minors both under the age of consent.

Under Skelton and in cooperation with the Legal Resources Centre, the Centre for Child Law took legal action against Department of Education regarding a series of crises in schools in the Eastern Cape. One case was settled out-of-court in 2012, when the department agreed to fill thousands of vacant teacher posts in the province, and another was concluded in the centre's favour in 2013, when the Mthatha High Court ordered the department to provide furniture to schools in Libode.

In 2015, Skelton represented the interests of a seven-year-old British boy in a highly publicised custody battle between his parents: the boy's mother had taken him to South Africa after authorities in the United Kingdom remanded him to foster care; and his father, supported by United Kingdom authorities, applied for his return. The following year, Skelton was appointed to represent the interests of Zephany Nurse, a teenage girl who had been abducted from Groote Schuur Hospital in 1997 and raised by her kidnapper. After the kidnapper was convicted in a criminal trial, Nurse's case provided the basis for the Centre for Child Law's attempts to establish default legal protections shielding the identities of child victims, witnesses, and offenders, though Nurse later applied to have the protection order lifted in her own case.

== Public service ==
=== South Africa ===
During the post-apartheid transition, Skelton was involved in drafting proposals to reform the juvenile criminal justice system in South Africa. In 1996, she was appointed to lead the project committee of the South African Law Reform Commission that was tasked by Justice Minister Dullah Omar with drafting related legislation. The committee finalised the draft Child Justice Bill in August 2000; among other things, it included ambitious sentencing reforms for children under the age of 18. It was signed into law by President Kgalema Motlanthe in May 2009, following a prolonged wrangle in Parliament and civil society. In 2011, Skelton expressed misgivings about the implementation of the law.

Also through the South African Law Reform Commission, Skelton was a member of the committee that drafted the Children's Act of 2005. She was also a member of the ministerial advisory committee that reviewed the social welfare white paper and is a member of the board of Section27, a social justice non-profit.

In 2010, Skelton became involved in the dispute between the government of Gauteng and Paul Verryn, a bishop of the Methodist Church of Southern Africa, whose church in central Johannesburg had become shelter to a large number of Zimbabwean refugees. In December 2009, in a bid to defuse the dispute, Verryn and the Legal Resources Centre applied to have Skelton appointed as curator for the numerous unaccompanied minors living in the church. The Johannesburg High Court granted the order and charged Skelton with making recommendations for the care of the minors; in the meantime, Verryn was suspended for having acted without the Methodist Church's authorisation in applying for Skelton's appointment. In the report of her investigation, released in February 2010, Skelton praised Verryn for "providing shelter and assistance to a group of children to whom little or no assistance was, initially, being offered by the state", but concluded that his church was "an unsuitable place for children" and also that allegations of child sexual abuse in the church "were sufficiently alarming... to have required a more robust response".

In May 2014, the Pretoria High Court appointed Skelton to make recommendations in a controversial baby-swopping case, involving a boy and girl who had been swopped as newborns at the Tambo Memorial Hospital in Boksburg in 2010. Skelton reported in November that it would not be in the children's best interests to return to their biological parents, and she recommended instead that their "psychological parents" should be named their adoptive parents.

=== United Nations ===
In June 2016, the South African Department of Justice and Constitutional Development and Department of International Relations and Cooperation nominated Skelton as a candidate for membership of the UN Committee on the Rights of the Child (UNCRC), which oversees the implementation of the international Convention on the Rights of the Child. She was elected and took office in May 2017. During her first term, she led the drafting of general comment 24, published in 2019, on children's rights in the child justice system. In other wings of the UN, she chaired the advisory board of the UN Global Study on Children Deprived of Liberty and chaired the drafting committee for the Abidjan Principles on the Right to Education and the role of private actors in education provision.

In November 2020, Skelton was elected to a second term as a member of the UNCRC, which will run until February 2025. She chaired the UNCRC's working group on communications from 2021 to 2023. She was the head of the UNCRC complaints procedure in October 2021, when the UNCRC made its historic response to a complaint from young climate activists including Greta Thunberg and Ayakha Melithafa; the committee held that states could be held responsible for the negative effects of their carbon emissions on the rights of children.

At the 93rd session of the UNCRC in Geneva in May 2023, she was elected to succeed Mikiko Otani as chairperson of the committee. She served in this position until March 2025.

== Honours ==
In May 2012, Skelton was awarded the World's Children's Prize for the Rights of the Child for her "successful fight for the rights of children affected by the justice system". In 2016, the International Juvenile Justice Observatory awarded her the Juvenile Justice without Borders International Award "for her extensive dedication to the defence of children's rights... and especially for her outstanding achievements in improving the juvenile justice system in South Africa". She received the University of Pretoria's Exceptional Academic Achievers Award on two occasions, in 2018 and 2022, and she received an honorary LLD from the University of Strathclyde in June 2023. She is also a member of the Academy of Science of South Africa.
