= Capitation =

Capitation may refer to:

- Poll tax or head tax, a tax of a fixed amount per individual
- Capitation (healthcare), a system of payment to medical service providers
- Capitation fee, a fee or payment of a uniform amount charged per person

== See also ==
- Cavitation, the formation and then immediate implosion of cavities in a liquid
