= Acid Survivors Foundation =

Bangladeshi non-governmental organisation

Acid Survivors Foundation (ASF)
- Founded: Dhaka, Bangladesh (May 1999)
- Type: Non-profit, Interest group
- Location: Administrative headquarters in Dhaka, Bangladesh
- Region served: Bangladesh
- Services: Treats victims of acid violence and helps them reintegrate themselves into normal life
- Fields: Protecting human rights
- Key people: Sir John Morrison, Founding Executive Director. Sarder Jahangir Hossain, Executive Director. Advocate Fawzia Karim Firoz, Chairperson, Board of Trustees.
- Website: acidsurvivors.org

The Acid Survivors Foundation is a Bangladeshi non-governmental organisation dedicated to raising awareness and preventing acid attacks and providing survivors with medical and legal aid.

== History ==
The Foundation was founded in Dhaka in 1999 by British physician Dr John Morrison with considerable assistance from British surgeon, Dr Ronald Hiles and subsequently, a group of four concerned citizens namely i) Mr. Kazi Fazlur Rahman, former adviser to the caretaker president. ii) Dr. S. L. Sen, Plastic Surgeon. iii) Advocate Sigma Huda & iv) Mr. Selim Ahmed on 12 May 1999 with substantial support from UNICEF and the Canadian International Development Agency. Nasreen Huq a commanding personality in the field of social reform and human rights in Bangladesh campaigned internationally for ASF. In 2005, Monira Rahman the Ex-Executive Director of ASF was awarded the Human Rights Award by Amnesty International.

Bangladesh's ASF has subsequently been used as a model organisation for the establishment of ASFs in Uganda, Cambodia, and Pakistan, all of which are sustained by Acid Survivors Trust International (ASTI) also headed by Sir John Morrison.

== Notification and Referral Services (NRS) ==
Upon its establishment the ASF worked in collaboration with BRAC to develop a nationwide notification system to identify acid attacks within 24-hours. Within 48-hours the situation is to be investigated and the victim brought to the ASF hospital in Dhaka. A 24/7 hotline is also maintained, which allows attacks to be reported and victims to be transferred to the ASF hospital. The NRS also allows government agencies, NGOs, and the media to stay informed.

== Acid Survivors Foundation Hospital ==
Acid attack victims require specialised treatments including reconstructive plastic surgery, physiotherapy, and the application of pressure garments. Patients usually need specialised treatment for the eye, ear, nose, mouth, neck, and/or other body parts. Other injuries and health conditions including fractures, diabetes, pregnancy, etc. will affect the course of treatment procedure.

Upon ASF's inception in 1999, the Dhaka Medical College Hospital (DMCH), with its 8-bed burn unit, was the only hospital in Bangladesh that specialised in treating any form of burn injury. To partially rectify the situation, ASF, with the help of the British High Commission and British Women's Association started a 20-bed Burn Rehabilitation Center in November 1999, which has become known as informally as Thikana (meaning destination in Bengali).

== Psychological support services ==
The permanently damaging nature of acid attacks and the inefficiency of the Bangladesh justice system are a serious and sometimes permanent detriment to the psychological health of survivors and their families. This can result in the development of psychiatric conditions, including post-traumatic stress disorder and suicidal tendencies, needing specialized psychiatric care. However, DMCH is currently the only hospital in Bangladesh with a clinical psychology department.

Consequently, ASF provides bed-side and community psychological support to help victims and their families overcome the trauma of the attack. ASF currently has one clinical psychologist and two peer counselors at its hospital to provide counselling and psycho-therapeutic services. ASF also organises music and art therapy in its hospital to help patients express their emotions.

| Phase | Expected Symptoms |
|---|---|
| Admission | Anxiety/Terror Pain Sadness/Grief |
| Critical Care Phase | Acute Stress Disorder |
| In Hospital Recuperation | Increased Pain with exercise Anger/Rage Grief Depression/Rapid Emotional Shifting |
| Rehabilitation and Reintegration | Adjustment difficulties PTSD Anxiety Depression |

== Rehabilitation and reintegration ==
Attacks will temporarily removes one's capacity for work or study. This capacity can be rebuilt following treatment through rehabilitation and reintegration techniques.

ASF statistics have shown that 46% of perpetrators are someone close to the victim. About 26% are husbands and 20% are other family members. Therefore, many victims of acid violence are unable to return to their families; however, some are compelled to regardless due to a lack of an income source.

The Department of Social Welfare and both National and District Acid Control Councils have funds that provide interest free loans to survivors. ASF is continuously working with its partners and survivors to ensure that these funds are effectively used for benefit of acid survivors. Microfinancing is often not an option as acid survivors fall into a high risk category for investment. They initially do not have a regular source of income and do not feel confident about repayment of loans.

=== Rehabilitation strategy ===
ASF works to rehabilitate its patients through the use of the following measures:

==== Advocacy ====
ASF advocates to ensure that survivors' legal rights are met. ASF's advocacy campaigns directly involve survivors as spokespersons for change. This allows campaigns to hold more clout and give survivors more self-confidence. ASF also lobbies with the government, NGOs, business organisations, and other agencies to provide rehabilitation support for survivors.

==== Direct services from ASF ====
To ensure that survivors are in a position to act as spokespersons, they will need to have secured livelihoods. As such, ASF complements government efforts by providing rehabilitation support to survivors through social protection and other schemes, which enable survivors to establish a secured livelihood and successfully reintegration into mainstream society.

| Input | Process | Output |
|---|---|---|
Free medical treatment Legal assistance Emergency family assistance Support for education Psychological counseling Grant to develop IGA || Vocational training Life skills training Social skills training Leadership training Help with job seeking & placement Survivors forums Government linkage || Improved income Improved living conditions Asset management skills Financial management skills Confidence Improved social capital Becomes a role model for others

ASF also provides emergency financial support to victim's who are the sole breadwinner of their family and provides education support to encourage survivors to continue primary and secondary schooling.

== Legal support ==
The effective prevention of acid violence can only be ensured if all perpetrators are brought to justice and the state can effectively control the illegal use of acid.

Prior to 2002 acid related offences were primarily dealt with using The Prevention of Oppression Against Women and Children Act of 2000. ASF along with other humans' rights organisations, social activists, and pressure groups advocated for the introduction of new laws to combat acid offences specifically. ASF, the newspaper Prothom Alo, and BRAC on International Women's Day mobilised over 5000 people to march alongside 100 acid attack survivors as a campaign for new laws.

ASF's efforts have resulted in the creation of two laws on 17 April 2002, the Acid Crime Control Act (ACCA) and the Acid Control Act (ACA), making it the first country in the world to have specific laws against acid attacks.

ASF provides legal support for survivors by referring them to its legal partners including BRAC, Aino Salish Kendro (ASK), the Bangladesh National Women Lawyer's Association (BNWLA), and the Bangladesh Legal Aid Services and Trust (BLAST). ASF's case managers prepare case reports of each survivor as they are admitted in the ASF Hospital and then provide legal advice to both survivors and their family. While the legal partners pursue court cases for each survivor, ASF's case managers monitor the role of the police and public prosecutors to ensure the utmost concern is given.

== Advocating awareness ==
Bangladesh has the highest reported incidence of acid violence in the world. In Bangladesh, acid violence is largely a gender-discriminatory crime against women. Since its inception, ASF has worked to create successful prevention campaigns which have led to significant reductions in acid attacks. ASF runs local and national prevention campaigns using radio, television, and print to bring the issue into public attention.

=== ASF campaigns 2011 ===
| Type of campaign | # of events | Total participants |
|---|---|---|
| School and college | 42 | 9,325 |
| Survivors' conference | 4 | 238 |
| Community meetings | 92 | 4,572 |

=== School and college campaigns ===
ASF has organised various school and college campaigns to motivate students into taking an active role in preventing of acid violence in their communities. The campaigns also help raise awareness as to the causes of acid violence, which will engender a change in attitude towards women and human relationships. The campaigns also work to sensitise youth to the social rehabilitation needs of victims and to encourage youth not to discriminate against students with scars and disfigurements. Students are also informed as to the proper procedure for dealing with acid attacks.

=== Community meetings ===
ASF's community meetings involve survivors' families, community leaders, and representatives of the local government with the purpose of making them aware of the consequences of acid violence as well as the psycho-social struggles of survivors. Plans to accelerate community acceptance of survivors, ensure social protection, and promote favourable environments for healing are also discussed.

=== "Use water" ===
ASF has taken great measures to raise awareness as to the importance of using water immediately after an attack. Information is given to do the following if any part of the body is exposed to acid or if acid is swallowed:

- Pour large amounts of water on the affected area for at least thirty minutes.
- Hold eyelids open and flush the area with water for at least thirty minutes if eyes are affected.
- Drink large amounts of water and vomit immediately if acid is swallowed.

| Patients use of water | Usual treatment | Average hospital stay | Complication |
|---|---|---|---|
| Used water | Conservative | 16 Days | Minimum |
| Did not use water | Operative | 36 days | Contractures, Hypertrophic scars and disability |

== International support ==
=== United Kingdom ===
==== Department of International Development ====
21 June 2011, British Minister of State for the Department of International Development Alan Duncan visits the ASF hospital and interacts with survivors. He also met with the Prime Minister to request the securing of a plot of land where the British Government would help ASF build an "ASF Burn Complex". The reduction in the number of acid related burn

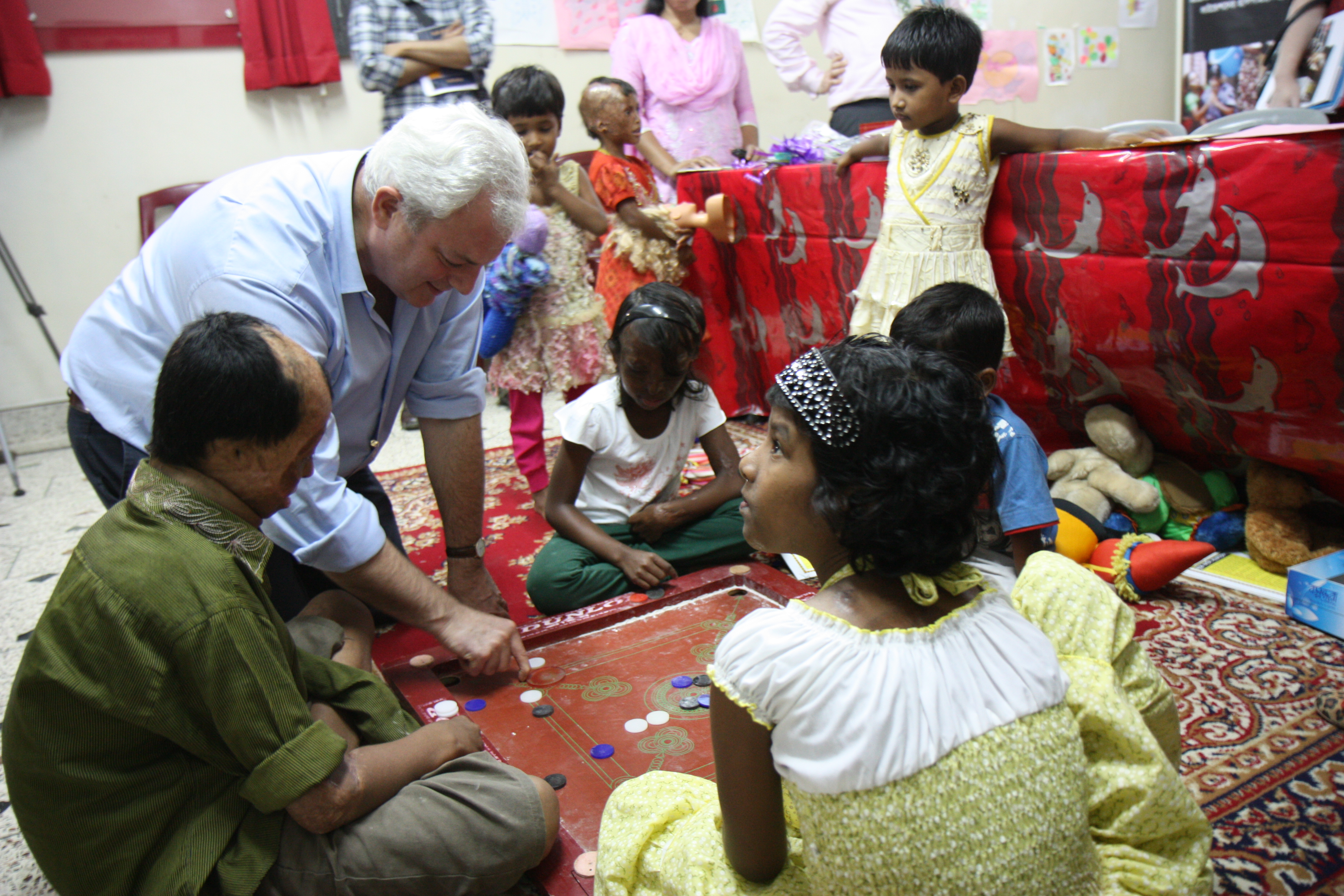

|British Parliamentary Undersecretary of State in the Department of International Development Stephen O'Brien plays a game with victims of acid attacks at the ASF Hospital in Dhaka, Bangladesh on 18 November 2011 cases has been in proportion to increasing reports of kerosene and gas attacks. Bangladesh has a single 100-bed facility for treating all these cases, which ASF and the Department of International Development both agree is not sufficient.

==== The Princess Anne, The Princess Royal ====
1 March 2011, Princess Anna visits ASF for the second time (the first being in 2000), where she witnessed the rehabilitation centre in action and interacted with some victims.

==== English Cricket Team ====
17 February 2011, the English Cricket Team visits ASF, where they interacted with victims.

=== France ===
==== Human Rights Prize of the French Republic ====
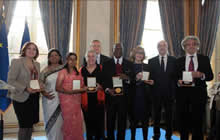
ASF receives the Human Rights Prize of the French Republic

10 December 2011, ASF receives the prize from the French Human Rights Commission at a ceremony held at the Quai d'Orsay in Paris.

=== World's Children's Prize ===
28 April 2011, Dr. Monira Rahman, Murhabazi Namegabe, and Cecilia Flores-Oebanda are honoured as the Children's Rights Heroes for millions of children at the Gripsholm Castle in Mariefred, Sweden.

== Statistics ==
=== Acid attacks from 1999 to 2018 ===
| Period | Number of incidents | Number of persons attacked | | | |
| Period | Number of incidents | Women | Men | Children | Total |
|---|---|---|---|---|---|
| 1999 | 165 | 70 | 25 | 72 | 167 |
| 2000 | 240 | 114 | 32 | 94 | 240 |
| 2001 | 351 | 133 | 91 | 128 | 352 |
| 2002 | 494 | 236 | 137 | 123 | 496 |
| 2003 | 417 | 209 | 121 | 90 | 420 |
| 2004 | 326 | 193 | 65 | 75 | 333 |
| 2005 | 222 | 154 | 71 | 52 | 277 |
| 2006 | 183 | 136 | 58 | 30 | 224 |
| 2007 | 162 | 113 | 48 | 38 | 199 |
| 2008 | 142 | 94 | 55 | 35 | 184 |
| 2009 | 129 | 93 | 44 | 22 | 159 |
| 2010 | 122 | 90 | 38 | 32 | 160 |
| 2011 | 91 | 63 | 30 | 25 | 118 |
| 2012 | 71 | 50 | 22 | 26 | 98 |
| 2013 | 69 | 44 | 28 | 13 | 85 |
| 2014 | 56 | 37 | 20 | 13 | 70 |
| 2015 | 60 | 41 | 24 | 10 | 75 |
| 2016 | 45 | 35 | 10 | 7 | 52 |
| 2017 | 40 | 31 | 9 | 9 | 49 |
| 2018 | 15 | 9 | 4 | 6 | 19 |
