= Child marriage in Sierra Leone =

UNICEF's Early Marriage: A Harmful Traditional Practice report characterizes child marriage as a harmful institution that often exposes young women in developing nations to damaging domestic, health, and sexual conditions. The report also highlights the practice as a human rights violation. In World Vision's "Before She's Ready: 15 Places Girls Marry by 15", the organization highlights the socioeconomic consequences of child marriage on girls, noting that many girls are forced to stop their schooling as a result of their marriages. With the denial of education, girl brides are often not able to make income as adults or become politically active citizens.

Sierra Leone's major child marriage legislation is the 2007 Child Rights Act, which states that the minimum age of betrothal/marriage is eighteen years old. The act also commits the country to the elimination of the forced marriage of girls. It rejects the customary practices of betrothal and marriage for minors, and orders that such practices may not be forced upon minors.

According to Sierra Leonean customary law, a marriage is not considered a valid customary marriage unless both parties are at least 18 years old, with the Customary Marriage and Divorce Act dictating this in 2007. However, in the case that a minor's parents are able to give consent to the union, a legal marriage is able to take place. If the consent of the parents is not able to be achieved, "a Magistrate or Local Government Chief Administrator of the locality in which the marriage is to take place" is able to provide their consent to verify the marriage. In accordance with customary tradition, child marriages are often the result of unions arranged by the parents of the young bride.

As stated by UNICEF's The State of the World's Children 2013 report, 18% of Sierra Leonean women are married by the age of 15, while 44% of them are married by the age of 18. As of 2017, Sierra Leone was ranked by UNICEF as the 19th nation for the highest rates of child marriage.

In July 2024, a bill that bans child marriage in Sierra Leone has been signed into law.

== Prevalence by geographic region ==
In terms of prevalence based on geographic location, the practice varies, but child marriage is most common in "the northern and eastern districts of Sierra Leone, lower in the south, and lowest in the capital, Freetown." The institution of child marriage continues to be an acceptable practice in the rural cities and towns of Sierra Leone.

== Impacts of the Sierra Leonean Civil War on child marriages ==
With Sierra Leone's civil war, many young girls were conscripted into being child soldiers. Organization Girls Not Brides contends that due to the presence of female child soldiers in Sierra Leone, it may have aided in cultural perceptions of young girls as being mentally capable of marriage, with the justification being that since they were capable to physically engage in armed conflict, they could handle being married.

The Sierra Leonean Civil War left girls subject to sexual harassment and abuse. The African Child Policy Forum cites that throughout the civil war and at multiple war zones, "more than 70 per cent of the reported sexual violence were girls under 18, and more than 20 per cent of those were girls under 11." Young girls that forced into the rebel forces, especially, were raped by their male soldier counterparts, resulting in a marginalized group of young women during the post-civil war period with children born out of rape. In post-civil war Sierra Leone, the ramifications of wartime sexual abuse have manifested in the difficulty of girl mothers acquiring spouses. Culturally, prior to marriage, girls are expected to be virgins, but with the sexual abuse that was present during wartime, now-girl mothers are finding issues with finding husbands that will marry them despite no longer being virgins. Girl mothers in the post-civil war era have also experienced difficulty acquiring partners not only due to cultural perceptions of purity, but due to civil war political alignment. Though many girls were forced into the rebel forces, either as wives or soldiers, after the war, these girls experience difficulty in acquiring partners due to their previous association with the Revolutionary United Front. These social and political stigmas create problems for girl mothers in Sierra Leone that may seek marriage as a means of acquiring economic resources and stability from their partners.

== Governmental commitments against child marriage ==
Due to the country's civil war, many government branches and agencies have been left with insufficient funding and human capital needed to address many of the systemic issues that the country faces, including child marriage.

In order to establish what the African Child Policy Forum identifies as a "formal child protection system", the Sierra Leonean government, with its 2007 Child Rights Act, initiated Child Welfare Committees which authorized the government the ability to enforce state protection of children. Despite the enactment of the 2007 Child Rights Act, along with its Child Welfare Committees, the government of Sierra Leone has been condemned for not actively targeting the institution of child marriage in rural communities. Scholar Allard K. Lowenstein of the International Human Rights Clinic of Yale Law School has argued that socioeconomic conditions brought about by the systemic poverty in Sierra Leone further exacerbate the prevalence of child marriage.

In 2013, during the twenty-fourth session of the United Nations Human Rights Council General Assembly, Sierra Leone formally committed itself to "preventing" and "eliminating" child marriage in the country to the international community.

In 2016, Sierra Leone's Ministry of Finance and Economic Development in its United Nations Sustainable Development Goals report, committed itself to eliminating all forms of child marriage by the year 2030.

In July 2024, a bill that bans child marriage in Sierra Leone has been signed into law. It It criminalizes marrying any girl who is under 18 years old. Offenders face up to 15 years in prison or a fine of around $4,000 or both.

== Non-novernmental organizations' commitments against child marriage ==
Because Sierra Leone is one of the most high-risk countries for child marriage, a number of different non-governmental organizations have dedicated programming in Sierra Leone to combat child marriage.

International NGOs UNFPA and UNICEF, in 2016, first announced their joint 'Global Programme to End Child Marriage.' In the program, both organizations have committed themselves to stop child marriages in what they deem as the 12 highest risk nations for child marriage, including Sierra Leone. Tactics utilized in the program include emphasizing the importance of education to local young women, as well as advocacy for legal prohibition of child marriage in the countries that the program takes place. The program is also publicly supported by a number of nations and organizations, including "the Governments of Belgium, Canada, the Netherlands, Norway, the United Kingdom and the European Union, as well as Zonta International." This particular campaign targets the lack of awareness of women's legal rights in rural areas of Sierra Leone. Because of the lack of funding of Sierra Leone's justice system, a viable presence of formal laws often does not extend into the country's most rural areas.
