= Abidjan Principles on the Right to Education =

The Abidjan Principles were developed by a committee of experts following a three-year consultation process to clarify the aspects of existing international human rights law that pertain to education and provide guidance on their implementation. Adopted in 2019, they have been recognized as an authoritative interpretive text by international and regional bodies such as the United Nations Human Rights Council, the European Committee of Social Rights, the African Commission on Human and Peoples' Rights, and the Inter-American Commission on Human Rights. Their purpose is to offer states and other actors a reference frame for addressing tensions and questions related to the involvement in education of private and commercial entities.

== Background and development ==
The Abidjan Principles were developed in the context of an increasing presence of private actors in education that has been observed over the first two decades of the 21st century. They also respond to seven decades of international treaty law establishing education as a human right, beginning with Article 26 of the Universal Declaration of Human Rights, and continuing through the 1966 International Covenant on Civil and Political Rights and the International Covenant on Economic, Social and Cultural Rights of the same year. Over the last three decades governments have continued to affirm the right to education through a major education gatherings including at Jomtien (1990), Dakar (2000), and Incheon (2015).

Traditionally governments have been asked to act as duty-bearers of the right to education by acting in the multiple roles of rights guarantor, funder, provider, and regulator. However, in certain instances some of these roles are played by non-governmental entities. For example, a government might fund an external organization that inspects, accredits, or regulates schools. Additionally, many education systems include schools managed and run by non-profit, religiously-affiliated or for-profit entities. The Abidjan Principles were developed to bring clarity to what international treaty law requires of state actors as they increasingly work with a host of non-state entities.

According to the organizers' self-description, the Abidjan Principles document resulted from "an open, transparent, and widely consultative process" that began in 2015 and continued with international meetings and online consultations between 2016 and 2018. The drafting process was chaired by Ann Skelton the South African jurist and professor at the University of Pretoria. It has been noted that private-sector backgrounds were markedly absent among the drafting committee members and signatories. The principles were adopted by a group of 57 legal and educational experts at a February 2019 meeting in Abidjan, Côte d'Ivoire, in the presence of the United Nations Special Rapporteur on the right to education as well as representatives from civil society organizations.

== Content ==
The 97 guiding principles that constitute the Abidjan Principles on the Right to Education are organized into six sections that provide guidance on how the Right to education should be respected, protected and fulfilled.

1. Definitions and scope
2. Obligation to respect, protect, and fulfil the right to education to the maximum of available resources
3. Obligations to respect, protect and fulfil the right to education in the context of private involvement
4. Financing
5. Accountability, monitoring and remedies
6. Implementation and monitoring of the guiding principles

The guiding principles have been further consolidated into 10 overarching principles that summarize the duties of states and the international community. These include items such as:

- "States must provide free, public education of the highest attainable quality to everyone within their jurisdiction as effectively and expeditiously as possible, to the maximum of their available resources." (Overarching Principle #2)
- "States must respect the liberty of parents or legal guardians to choose for their children an educational institution other than a public educational institution, and the liberty of individuals and bodies to establish and direct private educational institutions, subject always to the requirement that such private educational institutions conform to standards established by the State in accordance with its obligations under international human rights law." (Overarching Principle #3)
- "International assistance and cooperation, where provided, must reinforce the building of free, quality, public education systems, and refrain from supporting, directly or indirectly, private educational institutions in a manner that is inconsistent with human rights." (Overarching Principle #6)

== Visibility and impact ==
In November 2019 at the Paris Peace Forum, the Abidjan Principles were recognized as one of the top ten 'most promising governance projects'.

One critical implementation of the Abidjan Principles is considered to be Private Sector Engagement Strategy (2019-2022) of the Global Partnership for Education, a multistakeholder partnership and funding platform supporting education in low-income countries that is part of the World Bank's trust.

The Abidjan Principles have also been used by education researchers to assess the impact of private provision on the right to education, such as in a 2020 ActionAid-commissioned study "Private education and compliance with the Abidjan Principles: A study of Malawi, Mozambique, Tanzania and Nigeria" by Elaine Unterhalter and colleagues. Researchers have also employed the Abidjan Principles in studies on private supplementary tutoring, also referred to as "Shadow education".

The Abidjan Principles have also been critiqued in some quarters under the argument that they place severe restrictions on private education and interfere with parental choice regarding children's schooling.

Today numerous international organizations draw on the Abidjan Principles in their ongoing work to advance education globally. This includes, for example, the OECD's work on advancing equity and inclusion in education, and UNESCO's 2021/2 Global Education Monitoring (GEM) Report "Non-state actors in education: who chooses? who loses?", as well as in the 2022 Tashkent Declaration adopted during the UNESCO World Conference on Early Childhood Care and Education. The Abidjan Principles are also woven into the work of the UNESCO International Institute for Educational Planning guidance on "Equitable and inclusive policies and legislation".

The Abidjan Principles are championed by a number of civil society organizations, including the Right to Education Initiative (RTE), and the Privatisation in Education and Human Rights Consortium (PEHRC). The principles have also been invoked by the Tax Justice Network (TJN), Human Rights Watch (HRW) and Development Alternatives with Women for a New Era (DAWN).
