= Mikiko Otani =

Japanese lawyer

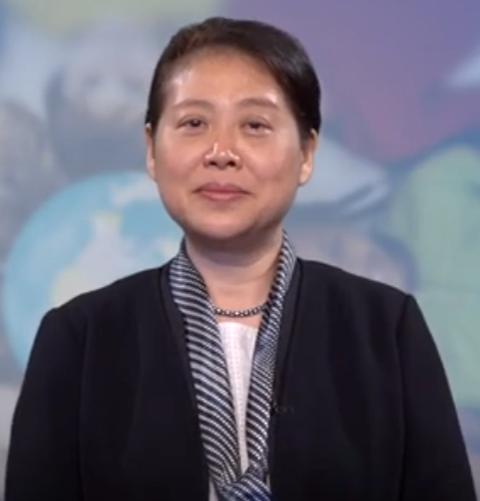
- In a UNOHCHR video in 2021
- Born: November 18, 1964 (age 61)
- Citizenship: Japan
- Occupations: Former Chairperson & Member of the United Nations Committee on the Rights of the Child; International Human Rights Lawyer

Academic background
- Education: Sophia University (LLB); Columbia University (MIA); University of Tokyo (LLM); Aoyama Gakuin University (Doctor of Law)
- Thesis: Right to Remedies of Child Victims of Violations of International Human Rights and Humanitarian Law (2020)

Academic work
- Discipline: Human rights law
- Sub-discipline: Child law
- Institutions: Leiden University
- Main interests: Children's rights, juvenile criminal justice, privacy of children,human rights

Mikiko Otani (born November 18, 1964) is a Japanese international human rights lawyer, and women's and children's rights advocate. She has been a member of the United Nations Committee on the Rights of the Child (CRC) since 2017 and served as its chairperson from May 2021 to May 2023 succeeding Ann Marie Skelton. She is the Rotating Honorary Chair in Enforcement of Children's Rights (2023/2024) at Leiden University.

Otani is a trustee at 5Rights Foundation, an organisation founded by Baroness Beeban Kidron to promote the rights of the child online.

== Early life and education ==
She was born in Osaka Prefecture. She obtained a Bachelor of Law (LL.B) in international legal studies from Sophia University in Japan in 1987 and a Master of International and Public Affairs (M.I.A) in human rights and humanitarian affairs from Columbia University, School of International and Public Affairs in the United States in 1999, Master of Law (LL.M) in public international law from University of Tokyo, Graduate School of Law and Politics in Japan in 2003.

She completed her Doctor of Law in public international law from Aoyama Gakuin University, Graduate School of Law in Japan, and received a PhD in Law in 2020 with the dissertation titled "Right to Remedies of Child Victims of Violations of International Human Rights and Humanitarian Law".

== Career ==
Otani started her career as a practicing lawyer (attorney at law) when she was admitted to the Tokyo Bar Association in 1990. While practicing law, she has actively been involved in NGO activities for international human rights work for children and women in Japan and Asia-Pacific. She served as a mediator at the Tokyo Family Court since 2003. She was appointed as an alternate representative of the Japanese delegation to the 60th and 61st General Assembly in 2005 and 2006, as a Vice-President of the Japan Women’s Bar Association at the time.

In 2016, she was nominated by the government of Japan as a candidate for a member of the UN Committee on the Rights of the Child, a treaty monitoring body for the UN Convention on the Rights of the Child. In 2017, she became the first Japanese member of the United Nations Convention on the Rights of the Child Committee.

In May 2021, she was elected as Chairperson of the CRC for the term from May 2021 to May 2023. During the chairperson’s term, she actively supported the promotion of mainstreaming of child rights throughout the United Nations system.

She currently holds leadership positions in child rights and human rights civil society organizations, which include President of Child Rights Connect, a member of the Board of Trustees of the Child Rights Coalition Asia, Commissioner and a member of the Executive Committee of the International Commission of Jurists.

== See also ==
- UN Committee on the Rights of the Child
- UN Convention on the Rights of the Child
