= Mohini Jain v. State of Karnataka =

1992 Supreme Court of India case

- Court: Supreme Court of India
- Decided: 30 July 1992
- Citation: 1992 AIR 1858; 1992 SCC (3) 666; 1992 SCR (3) 658

Court membership
- Judges sitting: Kuldip Singh, R.M. Sahai

Case opinions
- The right to education is as an integral part of the right to life guaranteed under Article 21
- Decision by: Kuldip Singh

Mohini Jain v. State of Karnataka, a 1992 Supreme Court of India case, occurred when the Government of Karnataka issued a notification that permitted the private medical colleges in the State of Karnataka to charge exorbitant tuition fees from the students admitted other than the "Government seat quota". Miss Mohini Jain, a medical aspirant student filed a petition in Supreme Court challenging this notification. The apex Court raised an important question that "whether right to education is guaranteed to the Indian citizen under the Constitution of India?"

The Supreme Court of India observed that mention of "life and personal liberty" in Article 21 of the Constitution automatically implies some other rights, those are necessary for the full development of the personality, though they are not enumerated in Part III of the Constitution. Education is one such factor responsible for overall development of an individual and therefore, right to education is integrated in Article 21 of the Constitution.

== A brief on the case ==
Mohini jain a resident of Meerut (in the State of UP), applied for admission to the MBBS course in the session commencing February/March, 1991, to a private medical college located in the State of Karnataka. The college management asked her to deposit a sum of Rs. 60,000/- as the tuition fee for the first year and also to show a bank guarantee of the amount equal to the fee for the remaining years. When Miss Jain's father intimated the management that the asked amount was beyond his reach, the management denied Ms. Jain's admission to the medical college. Miss Jain informed the court that the management demanded an additional amount of Rs. four and a half lakhs, however, the management denied the allegation (?).

As per the notification, the denial of admission of Miss Jain due to her failure to submit the yearly tuition fee of Rs. 60,000/- was a valid step taken by the college management. In this situation, Miss Jain filed a petition (Writ petition (Civil) No. 456 of 1991) under Article 32 (1) ("The right to move the Supreme Court by appropriate proceedings for the enforcement of the rights conferred by this Part (Part III: Fundamental Rights) is guaranteed") of the Constitution of India challenging the notification issued by the Government of Karnataka.

A two-member bench consisting Justice Kuldip Singh and Justice R. M. Sahai gave the judgment of the case on 30 July 1992 (1992 AIR 1858). For the first time in the post independent India, right to education of the Indian citizens and the State obligation to secure the right came under scrutiny at the premises of the apex court. This was the time when neo-liberal economic policy were knocking at the door of India.

== The notification ==
It is relevant to know in this context that what was the notification issued by the Government of Karnataka. The Government of Karnataka issued a notification dated 5 June 1989 under section 5(1) of the Karnataka Educational Institutions (Prohibition of capitation fee) Act, 1984, which fixed the tuition and other fees to be charged from the students by the private medical colleges in the state. As per the notification, the tuition fee for the candidates admitted against:

1. "Government seat" was Rs. 2,000 per year,

2. For the students from Karnataka but not falling under "Government seat" was not to be exceeding Rs. 25,000/- per year, and

3. For the Indian students not residing in Karnataka was not to be exceeding Rs. 60,000/- per year.

== Responses from the respondents ==
First respondent was the State of Karnataka. The second (the intervener) and the third respondent were the Karnataka Private Medical Colleges Association and the private medical college respectively. According to the third respondent, the private medical college, those students who were admitted under "Government seat quota" were meritorious and those who were admitted under the "Management quota" (other than "Government seat") were not meritorious; the classification was valid and hence, in such situation, the college-management had the right to charge more fee from non-meritorious students to meet the expenses in order to provide medical education to the students.

According to the intervener, Karnataka Private Medical Colleges Association, the private medical colleges in the state of Karnataka received no financial aid either from the State or Central Government. The expenditure per student for 5-year MBBS course in private medical colleges was about 5 lakhs and forty percent of the seats were filled by the "Government Quota" under which students paid only Rs. 2,000/- per year, therefore, students admitted under "Management quota" had to share the burden. Hence, the tuition fee was not excessive and there was no question of profit making by the private medical colleges in the State of Karnataka.

Moreover, both the intervener and the third respondent mentioned that there were no provision either in the constitution of India or under any other law which prevented the charging of capitation fee.

== Issues before the Court ==
In the above situation, several crucial questions appeared before the court. Now, the court had to answer the following major questions:

a) Was there a 'right to education' guaranteed to the people of India under the Constitution?

b) If the right is guaranteed to the people then, does applying capitation fee violate the guaranteed right to education?

c) Whether charging capitation fee in educational institutions is arbitrary, unjust, unfair and violated Article 14 ("The State shall not deny to any person equality before the law or the equal protection of the laws within the territory of India" ) of the constitution?

== Decision ==
The court said that the dignity of human can not be violated under any situation and that it is the responsibility of the state to respect and protect the dignity of its citizens. Individuals cannot be assured of human dignity unless their personality is developed and the only way to do so is educating individuals. When the Constitution was framed and adopted in 1950, 70 percent of the citizens of the country were illiterate. The framers of the constitution hoped to achieve 100 percent literacy within 10 years. Guided by that hope, Article 41 ("The State shall, within the limits of its economic capacity and development, make effective provision for securing the right to work, to education and to public assistance in cases of unemployment, old age, sickness and disablement, and in other cases of underserved want") and Article 45 ("The State shall endeavour to provide, within a period of ten years from the commencement of this Constitution, for free and compulsory education for all children until they complete the age of fourteen years") were included in the Chapter IV of the Constitution.

The court referred to the various provisions in the Constitution of India and reminded that its Preamble promised to secure to all citizens of India "Justice, social, economic and political" and "Liberty of thought, expression, belief, faith, and worship". It further provided "Equality of status and of opportunity" and assured individual dignity. The objectives flowing from the Preamble cannot be achieved but would remain on paper unless the people in this country were educated.

The Court said that although the right to education had not been guaranteed as a fundamental right under Part III of the Constitution, Articles 21 (in Part III of the Constitution of India), Article 38, 39(a), (f), 41 and 45 (in Part IV of the Constitution of India) together clear showed that the framers of the Constitution had made it obligatory for the state to provide education for its citizens. Article 21 states "No person shall be deprived of his life or personal liberty except according to procedure established by law." The right to life under Article 21 and the dignity of an individual cannot be assured unless accompanied by right to education. Therefore, every citizen had a right to education under the constitution and so the state had an obligation to provide educational institutions at all levels for the benefit of all citizens. All educational institutions owned or recognised by the state, were obliged to secure the right to education.

In Part IV, the directive principles of the state policy, the Constitution asks the state to secure social order and to minimise inequalities for the promotion of welfare of citizens (Article 38). Article 39 of Part IV was about directing the state policies to secure adequate means of livelihood of citizen and offering opportunities to children to facilitate their healthy al-round development. Reality of the fundamental rights under Chapter III would not be realized by illiterate citizens unless the right to education under Article 41 was ensured to the individual citizen. Therefore, the right to education was concomitant to the fundamental rights provided under Part III of the Constitution.

The fundamental rights guaranteed under Part III of the Constitution, including the right to freedom of speech and expression and other rights under Article 19, cannot be appreciated and fully enjoyed unless citizen are educated and conscious of their individual dignity. Education is instrumental to reduce the inequality and ensuring adequate livelihood. Illiterate people are vulnerable to exploitation. Without education, the vision expressed in the said articles of the Constitution can not be realized. The court said that the Directive Principles, which are fundamental in the governance of the country, cannot be isolated from the fundamental rights guaranteed under Part III. They supplement one another and must be read into the fundamental rights.

== Court's responses on charging capitation fee ==
Charging capitation fee limits the access to the education only to the richer section of the people. Poorer person with better merit can not get admission due to inability to pay money and as a consequence in educational institution a citizen's "right to education" gets denied. Further, allowing charging capitation fee violates Article 14 of the constitution of India. The only method of admission to the medical colleges should be by merit and merit alone. The court further stated that the capitation fee was simply a price for selling education. The concept of "teaching shops" was not at par with the constitutional scheme and was entirely opposing character to the Indian culture and heritage.

Court made one significant remark in stating that if government recognises or approve a professional institution to run a professional course, it is State responsibility to ensure that the Institute should charge the government rates only and right to education is preserved.

== Significance ==
The judgment is historic in its own accord. The judgment of the Supreme Court has huge significance in a context of state's failure to maintain the endeavour set by Article 45 of the Constitution, even after 73 years of independence. However, the judgment of the court resulted mixed reaction. Some criticised the court's judgment as impractical and court's role as unnecessarily proactive, but others welcomed the court's decision as logical and response to the call of hour. Others noted the judgment as the expression of judicial activism because only a two-judge bench had made a substantial change in constitution.

The decisionappeared while liberalisation was a government policy looking for Indian soil to sprout, and commercialisation of education was not as rampant as it is now. In the recent trend of liberalization and privatization, the scourge of commercialization of education looms large. It is a challenge to keep the conformity with the socialist structure of Constitution, and the judgment is in the line of retaining the conformity.

The most notable part of the judgment was its insistence for the right to education to be read as an integral part of the right to life guaranteed under Article 21, Part III. The decision of the Court that the fulfillment of the right to life requires a life of dignity and so must be interpreted to include both the economic and social rights. Education is as basic as to ensure rights to food, water, and health.

However, the question arose whether the right to education at all level is essential for citizens for living a descent life. Should the right to education be limited to only right to primary and basic education? Should declaring right to education at higher education level actually increase the status quo and does the unequal distribution of resources result in the collapse of the entire education system in India? According to some critics, private educational institutions do not get any government grants and so should not be interpreted under the purview of Article 12. The Supreme Court later modified its judgment and to limit the right to free and compulsory education up to 14 years of age.

== Conclusion ==
The most important thing is, there was a traditional look towards Directive Principle as idealistic preaching of the constitution. This case, revisited the traditional ritualistic approach towards Directive Principles and provides a solid base of pragmatism.

The 86th Amendment of the Constitution, passed by Parliament in 2002, and which came into force on 1 April 2010, the same date as its enabling legislation (Right of Children to Free and Compulsory Education Act, 2009), made the Right to Education a Fundamental Right.
