= Monira Rahman =

Bangladeshi human rights activist

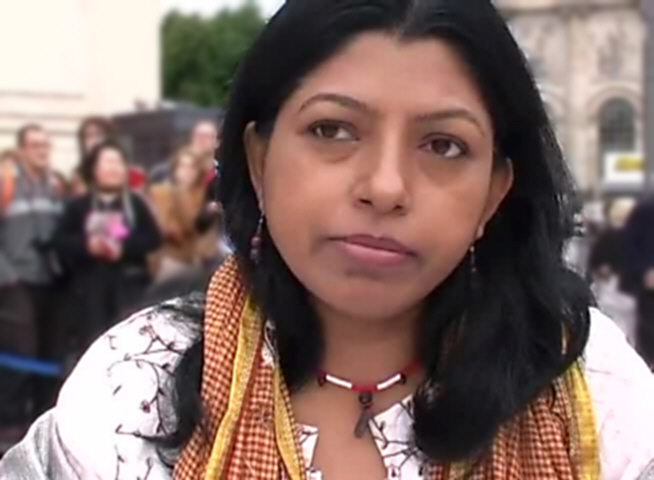
- Rahman in 2013
- Born: 1965 (age 60–61); Jessore, East Pakistan
- Notable work: Reduction in acid and petrol attack on woman in Bangladesh

Monira Rahman (born 1965 in Jessore, East Pakistan) is a Bangladeshi human rights activist. Due to her movement, acid and petrol attacks on women in Bangladesh have been reduced by 40 fold. Rahman won Amnesty International Human Rights Defender Award 2006 for her activism. She worked with the founder of Acid Survivors Foundation (ASF), Dr John Morrison and subsequently worked as executive director from 2002 to 2013. Rahman was commended by the World's Children's Prize in 2011 for her courageous fight to put an end to acid and petrol violence in Bangladesh. Rahman became Commonwealth Professional Fellow in 2012 and Ashoka Fellow in 2013.

== Early life ==
Rahman was the youngest of her six siblings. During the Bangladesh Liberation War (1971), her family had to flee and her father died, leaving her mother to raise six children. This devastating experience left a deep impression on Rahman and forced her to become very independent. Since childhood Rahman was involved in debate and cultural activities which led her to develop leadership and taught her to ask questions. She was elected Vice President of Samsunnahar Hall, University of Dhaka, Bangladesh during her university life. After graduation her family forced her to get a government job but instead she joined Concern Worldwide as a social worker.

== Education ==
Rahman completed her SSC from Qumarunnessa Girls School in 1981 and HSC from Eden Girls College in 1983. Afterward, she went to the University of Dhaka and completed her Bachelor of Arts (Hons) and Master of Arts in Philosophy in 1987 and 1988 respectively.

== Career ==
Rahman started her working life as a social worker in Concern Worldwide in 1992 and worked there until 1999. There, she worked to establish the rights of commercial sex workers, street children, and the homeless—especially mentally ill women living on the streets often arrested under the Vagrancy Act 1943. Rahman's work led the government to review the Vagrancy Act as well as the juvenile justice system and to enter into a formal agreement that commits the ministry to develop a vigilance team within the vagrant's home. During that time she was shocked by the amount and the severity of acid attacks on women throughout the country. She started working for the women's rights organization Nari Pokkho and then joined the Acid Survivors Foundation in 1998, which she has been executive director of since 2002. She is currently working as country lead in Mental Health First Aid Bangladesh and executive director of innovation for Wellbeing Bangladesh of which she is also the founder.

== Honours and awards ==
- Human Rights Defender (March 2006) – Amnesty International
- International Awards for Health and Dignity for women (October 2009) – Americans for UNFPA
- World's Children's Prize Honorary Award (April 2011) – World's Children's Prize Foundation, Sweden
- Commonwealth Professional Fellow (October 2012) – Commonwealth Scholarship Commission (CSC)
- Ashoka Fellowship (February 2015) – Ashoka, Innovators for the Public
