= Right to education =

Human right

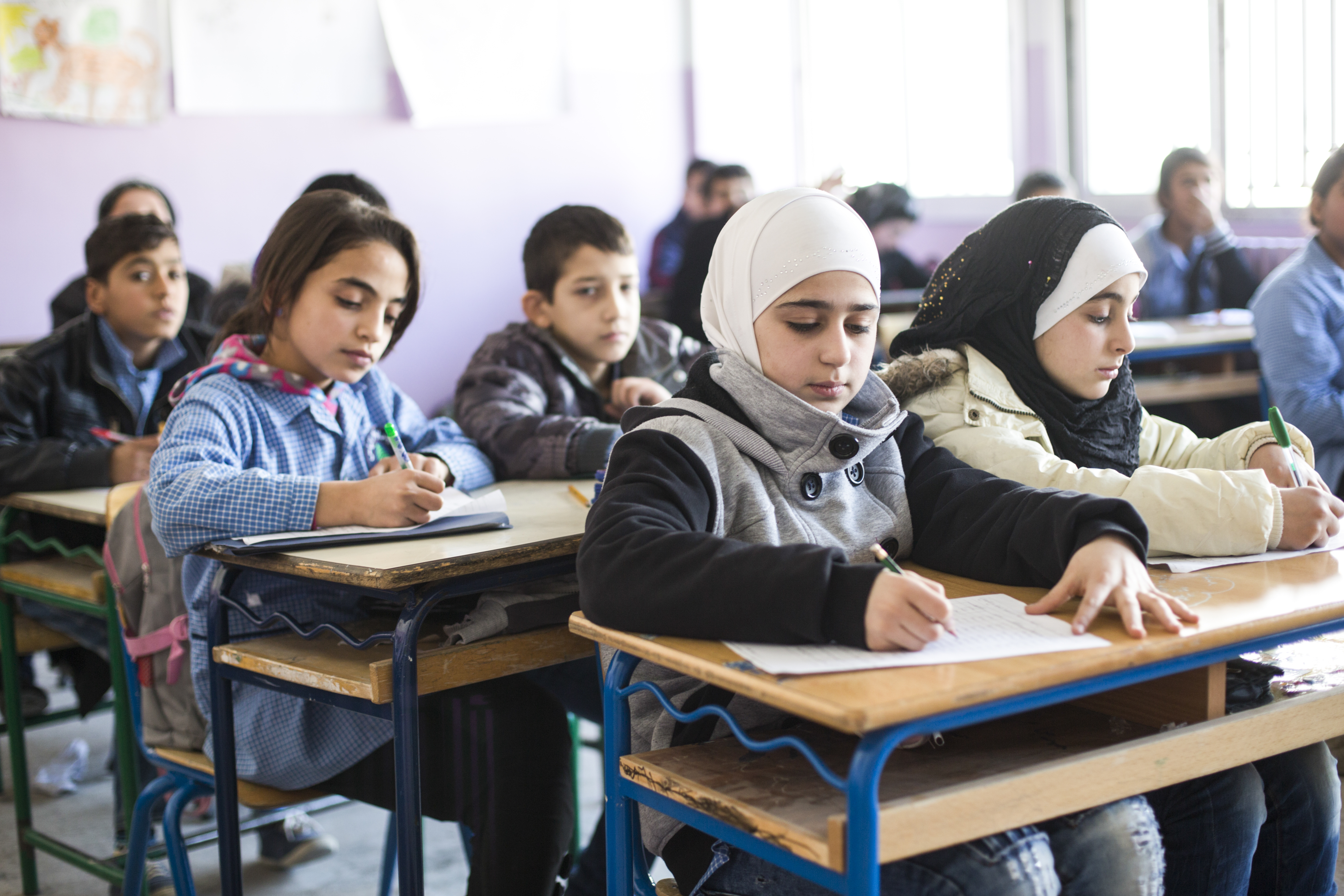
Syrian refugee students, Lebanon, 2016

The right to education has been recognized as a human right in a number of international conventions, including the International Covenant on Economic, Social and Cultural Rights which recognizes a right to free, primary education for all, an obligation to develop secondary education accessible to all with the progressive introduction of free secondary education, as well as an obligation to develop equitable access to higher education, ideally by the progressive introduction of free higher education. In 2021, 171 states were parties to the covenant.

In 2021, the new total of out-of-school children reached 250 million, with social inequality as a major cause. Around the world, 16% of youth were not attending any sort of schooling in 2023, with the primary level of education sitting at 1 out of 10 children not attending. 48% of the population not attending school were girls and young women.

== International legal basis ==
Convention on the Rights of Persons with Disabilities states parties states that have signed, but not ratified states that have not signed

The right to education is reflected in Article 26 of the Universal Declaration of Human Rights, which states:

"Everyone has the right to education. Education shall be free, at least in the elementary and fundamental stages. Elementary education shall be compulsory. Technical and professional education shall be made generally available and higher education shall be equally accessible to all on the basis of merit. Education shall be directed to the full development of the human personality and to the strengthening of respect for human rights and fundamental freedoms. It shall promote understanding, tolerance and friendship among all nations, racial or religious groups, and shall further the activities of the United Nations for the maintenance of peace. Parents have a prior right to choose the kind of education that shall be given to their children."

The right to education has been reaffirmed in the 1960 UNESCO Convention against Discrimination in Education, the 1966 International Covenant on Economic, Social and Cultural Rights, the 1981 Convention on the Elimination of All Forms of Discrimination Against Women, the 1989 Convention on the Rights of the Child, and the 2006 Convention on the Rights of Persons with Disabilities.

In Africa, both the 1981 the African Charter on Human and Peoples' Rights and the 1990 African Charter on the Rights and Welfare of the Child recognize the right to education.

In Europe, Article 2 of the first Protocol of 20 March 1952 to the European Convention on Human Rights states that the right to education is recognized as a human right and is understood to establish an entitlement to education. According to the International Covenant on Economic, Social and Cultural Rights, the right to education includes the right to free, compulsory primary education for all, an obligation to develop secondary education accessible to all in particular by the progressive introduction of free secondary education, as well as an obligation to develop equitable access to higher education in particular by the progressive introduction of free higher education. The right to education also includes a responsibility to provide basic education for individuals who have not completed primary education. In addition to these access to education provisions, the right to education encompasses also the obligation to eliminate discrimination at all levels of the educational system, to set minimum standards, and to improve quality. The European Court of Human Rights in Strasbourg has applied this norm for example in the Belgian linguistic case. Article 10 of the European Social Charter guarantees the right to vocational education.

According to Indian constitution under 86th Amendment act 2002, There is right to free and compulsory education up to 6–14 years of age.

It has been argued that "International law provides no effective protection of the right to pre-primary education", although two global treaties explicitly refer to education prior to primary school:

- the Convention on the Elimination of All Forms of Discrimination against Women requires states to ensure equality for girls "in pre-school",
- in the Convention on the Protection of the Rights of All Migrant Workers and Members of Their Families state parties agree that access to "public pre-school educational institutions" shall not be denied due to the parents' or child's "irregular situation with respect to stay".

Less explicitly, the Convention on the Rights of Persons with Disabilities requires that "States Parties shall ensure an inclusive education system at all levels."

In 2019 the Abidjan Principles on the Right to Education were adopted by a committee of international human rights law experts following a three-year period of development. Recognized as an authoritative interpretive text by some international and regional bodies such as the United Nations Human Rights Council, the European Committee of Social Rights, the African Commission on Human and Peoples' Rights, and the Inter-American Commission on Human Rights, their purpose is to offer states and other actors a reference frame for addressing tensions and questions related to the involvement in education of private and commercial entities.

In June 2024, the UN's Human Rights Council approved the establishment of a working group with the mandate of "exploring the possibility of, elaborating and submitting to the Human Rights Council a draft optional protocol to the Convention on the Rights of the Child with the aim to: (a) Explicitly recognize that the right to education includes early childhood care and education; (b) Explicitly state that, with a view to achieving the right to education, States shall: (i) Make public pre-primary education available free to all, beginning with at least one year; (ii) Make public secondary education available free to all."

== Definition ==
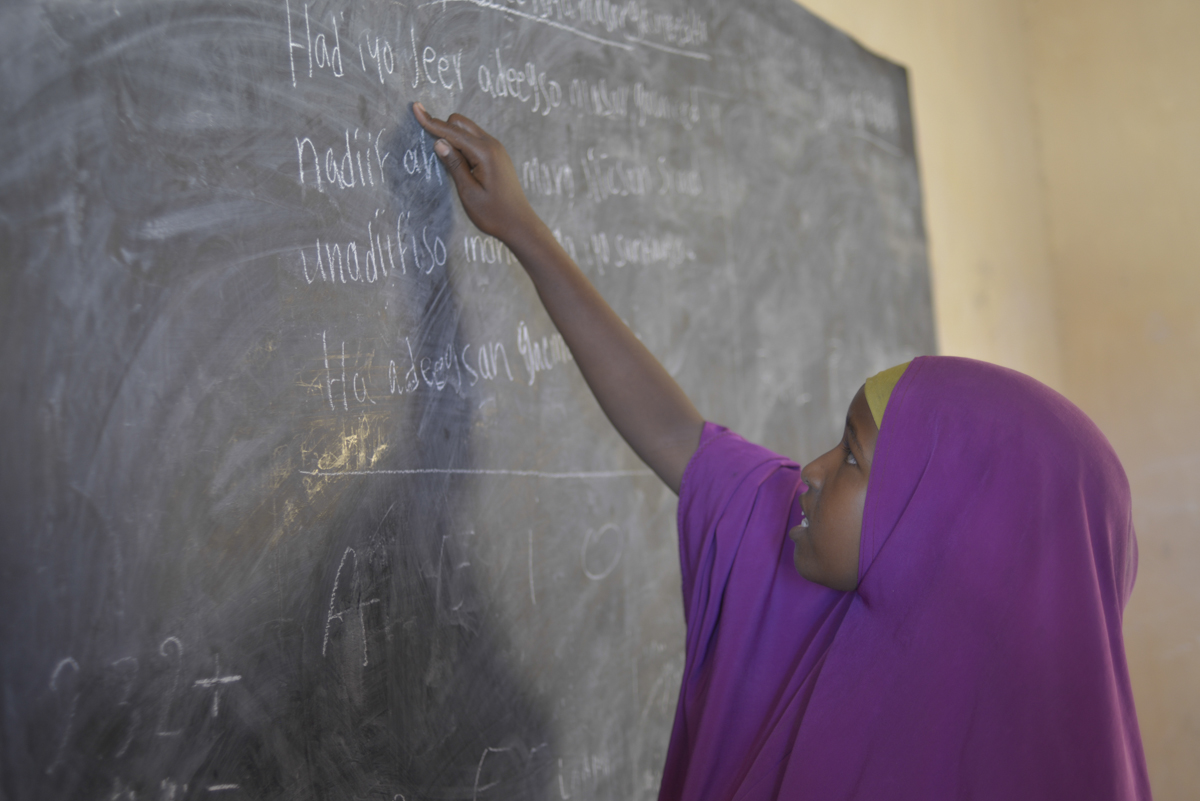
Girl student in Mogadishu

Education is the access to formal institutional instructions and is the process of learning value systems, knowledge, habits and skills. Generally, international instruments use the term in this sense and the right to education, as protected by international human rights instruments, refers primarily to education in a narrow sense. The 1960 UNESCO Convention against Discrimination in Education defines education in Article 1(2) as: "all types and levels of education, (including such) access to education, the standard and quality of education, and the conditions under which it is given."

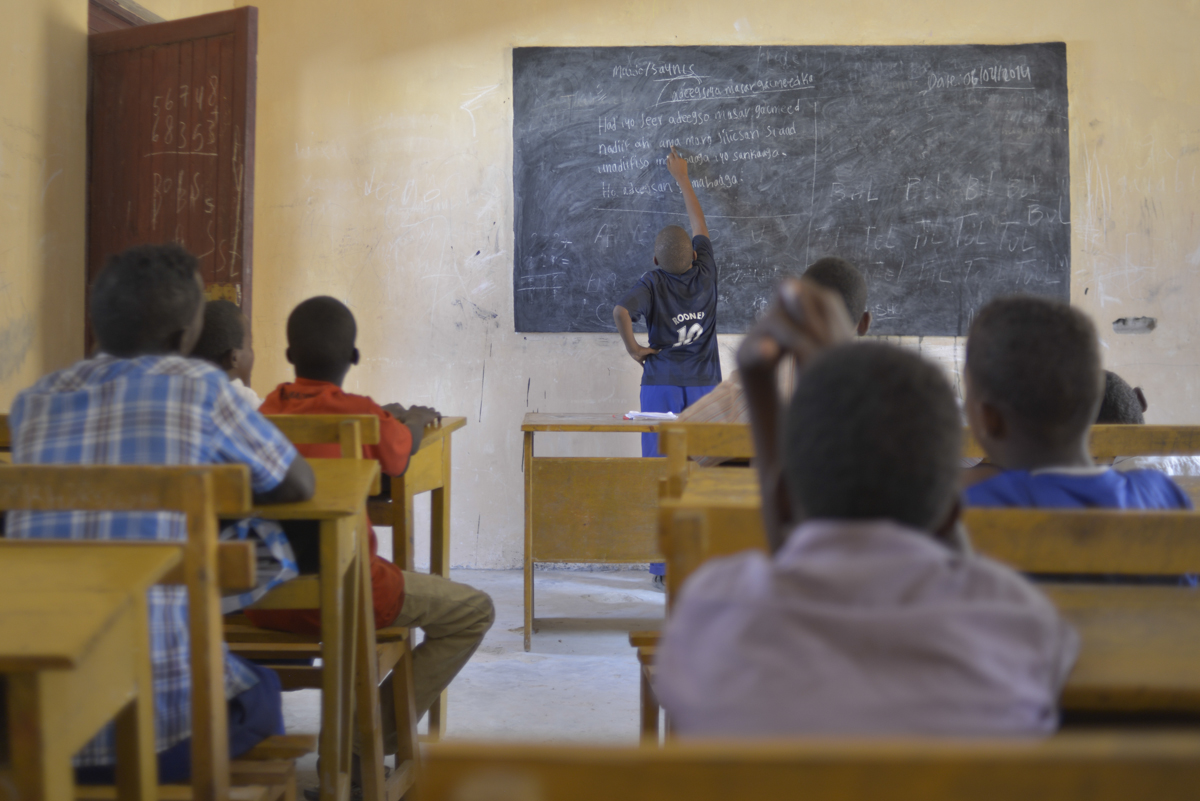
A student teaching other students in Mogadishu

In a wider sense education may describe "all activities by which a human group transmits to its descendants a body of knowledge and skills and a moral code which enable the group to subsist". In this sense education refers to the transmission to a subsequent generation of those skills needed to perform tasks of daily living, and further passing on the social, cultural, spiritual and philosophical values of the particular community. The wider meaning of education has been recognised in Article 1(a) of UNESCO's 1974 Recommendation concerning Education for International Understanding, Co-operation and Peace and Education relating to Human Rights and Fundamental Freedoms.

"the entire process of social life by means of which individuals and social groups learn to develop consciously within, and for the benefit of, the national and international communities, the whole of their personal capabilities, attitudes, aptitudes and knowledge."

The European Court of Human Rights has defined education in a narrow sense as "teaching or instructions... in particular to the transmission of knowledge and to intellectual development" and in a wider sense as "the whole process whereby, in any society, adults endeavour to transmit their beliefs, culture and other values to the young".

== Assessment of fulfilment ==
The 4As

The fulfilment of the right to education can be assessed using the 4As framework, which asserts that for education to be a meaningful right it must be available, accessible, acceptable and adaptable. The 4As framework was developed by the former UN Special Rapporteur on the Right to Education, Katarina Tomasevski, but is not necessarily the standard used in every international human rights instrument and hence not a generic guide to how the right to education is treated under national law.

The 4As framework proposes that governments, as the prime duty-bearers, have to respect, protect and fulfil the right to education by making education available, accessible, acceptable and adaptable. The framework also places duties on other stakeholders in the education process: the child, which as the privileged subject of the right to education has the duty to comply with compulsory education requirements, the parents as the ‘first educators’, and professional educators, namely teachers.

The 4As have been further elaborated as follows:

- Availability – funded by governments, education is universal, free and compulsory. There should be proper infrastructure and facilities in place with adequate books and materials for students. Buildings should meet both safety and sanitation standards, such as having clean drinking water. Active recruitment, proper training and appropriate retention methods should ensure that enough qualified staff is available at each school.
- Accessibility – all children should have equal access to school services, regardless of gender, race, religion, ethnicity or socio-economic status. Efforts should be made to ensure the inclusion of marginalized groups including children of refugees, the homeless or those with disabilities; in short there should be universal access to education i.e. access to all. Children who fall into poverty should be granted the access of education because it enhances the growth of their mental and social state. There should be no forms of segregation or denial of access to any students. This includes ensuring that proper laws are in place against any child labour or exploitation to prevent children from obtaining primary or secondary education. Schools must be within a reasonable distance for children within the community, otherwise transportation should be provided to students, particularly those that might live in rural areas, to ensure ways to school are safe and convenient. Education should be affordable to all, with textbooks, supplies and uniforms provided to students at no additional costs.
- Acceptability – the quality of education provided should be free of discrimination, relevant and culturally appropriate for all students. Students should not be expected to conform to any specific religious or ideological views. Methods of teaching should be objective and unbiased and material available should reflect a wide array of ideas and beliefs. Health and safety should be emphasized within schools including the elimination of any forms of corporal punishment. Professionalism of staff and teachers should be maintained.
- Adaptability – educational programs should be flexible and able to adjust according to societal changes and the needs of the community. Observance of religious or cultural holidays should be respected by schools in order to accommodate students, along with providing adequate care to those students with disabilities.

A number of international NGOs and charities work to realise the right to education using a rights-based approach to development.

== Historical development ==
In Europe, before the Enlightenment of the eighteenth and nineteenth century, education was the responsibility of parents and the church. With the French and American Revolutions, education was established also as a public function. It was thought that the state, by assuming a more active role in the sphere of education, could help to make education available and accessible to all. Education had thus far been primarily available to the upper social classes and public education was perceived as a means of realising the egalitarian ideals underlining both revolutions.

However, neither the American Declaration of Independence (1776) nor the French Declaration of the Rights of Man and of the Citizen (1789) protected the right to education, as the liberal concepts of human rights in the nineteenth century envisaged that parents retained the primary duty for providing education to their children. It was the state's obligation to ensure that parents complied with this duty, and many states enacted legislation making school attendance compulsory. Furthermore, child labour laws were enacted to limit the number of hours per day children could be employed, to ensure children would attend school. States also became involved in the legal regulation of curricula and established minimum educational standards.

In On Liberty, John Stuart Mill wrote that an "education established and controlled by the State should only exist, if it exists at all, as one among many competing experiments, carried on for the purpose of example and stimulus to keep the others up to a certain standard of excellence." Liberal thinkers of the nineteenth century pointed to the dangers to too much state involvement in the sphere of education, but relied on state intervention to reduce the dominance of the church, and to protect the right to education of children against their own parents. In the latter half of the nineteenth century, educational rights were included in domestic bills of rights. The 1849 Paulskirchenverfassung, the constitution of the German Empire, strongly influenced subsequent European constitutions and devoted Article 152 to 158 of its bill of rights to education. The constitution recognised education as a function of the state, independent of the church. Remarkable at the time, the constitution proclaimed the right to free education for the poor, but the constitution did not explicitly require the state to set up educational institutions. Instead the constitution protected the rights of citizens to found and operate schools and to provide home education. The constitution also provided for freedom of science and teaching, and it guaranteed the right of everybody to choose a vocation and train for it.

The nineteenth century also saw the development of socialist theory, which held that the primary task of the state was to ensure the economic and social well-being of the community through government intervention and regulation. Socialist theory recognised that individuals had claims to basic welfare services against the state and education was viewed as one of these welfare entitlements. This was in contrast to liberal theory at the time, which regarded non-state actors as the prime providers of education. In 1917 the Mexican constitution was the first to guarantee free and secular education. Later, socialist ideals were enshrined in the 1936 Soviet Constitution, which recognize the right to education with a corresponding obligation of the state to provide such education. The constitution guaranteed free and compulsory education at all levels, a system of state scholarships and vocational training in state enterprises. Subsequently, the right to education featured strongly in the constitutions of socialist states. As a political goal, right to education was declared in F. D. Roosevelt's 1944 speech on the Second Bill of Rights.

International law first began to regulate rights to education following World War I.

== The role of education for individuals, the society and the state ==
Education in all its forms (informal, non-formal, and formal) is crucial to ensure dignity of all individuals. The aims of education, as set out in the International human rights law (IHRL), are all directed to the realization of the individual's rights and dignity. These include, among others, ensuring human dignity and the full and holistic development of the human personality; fostering physical and cognitive development; allowing for the acquisition of knowledge, skills, and talents; contributing to the realization of the full potential of the individual; enhancing self-esteem and increasing confidence; encouraging respect for human rights; shaping a person's sense of identity and affiliation with others; enabling socialization and meaningful interaction with others; enabling a person to shape the world around them enables their participation in community life; contributing to a full and satisfying life within society; and empowering and allowing for the increased enjoyment of other human rights.

The multiple benefits of education

Education is also transformative for the state and society. As one of the most important mechanisms by which social groups, in particular indigenous peoples and minorities are maintained from generation to generation, passing on language, culture, identity, values, and customs, education is also one of the key ways states can ensure their economic, social, political, and cultural interests.

The main role of education within a society and the state is to:

- Allow for the transmission of culture, values, identity, languages, and customs from one generation to the next;
- Promote sustainable economic growth;
- Foster democratic and peaceful societies;
- Encourage participation and inclusion in decision-making processes;
- Encourage a rich cultural life;
- Help build a national identity;
- Promote social justice;
- Overcome persistent and entrenched challenges;
- Encourage sustainable development, including respect for the environment.

== Implementation ==
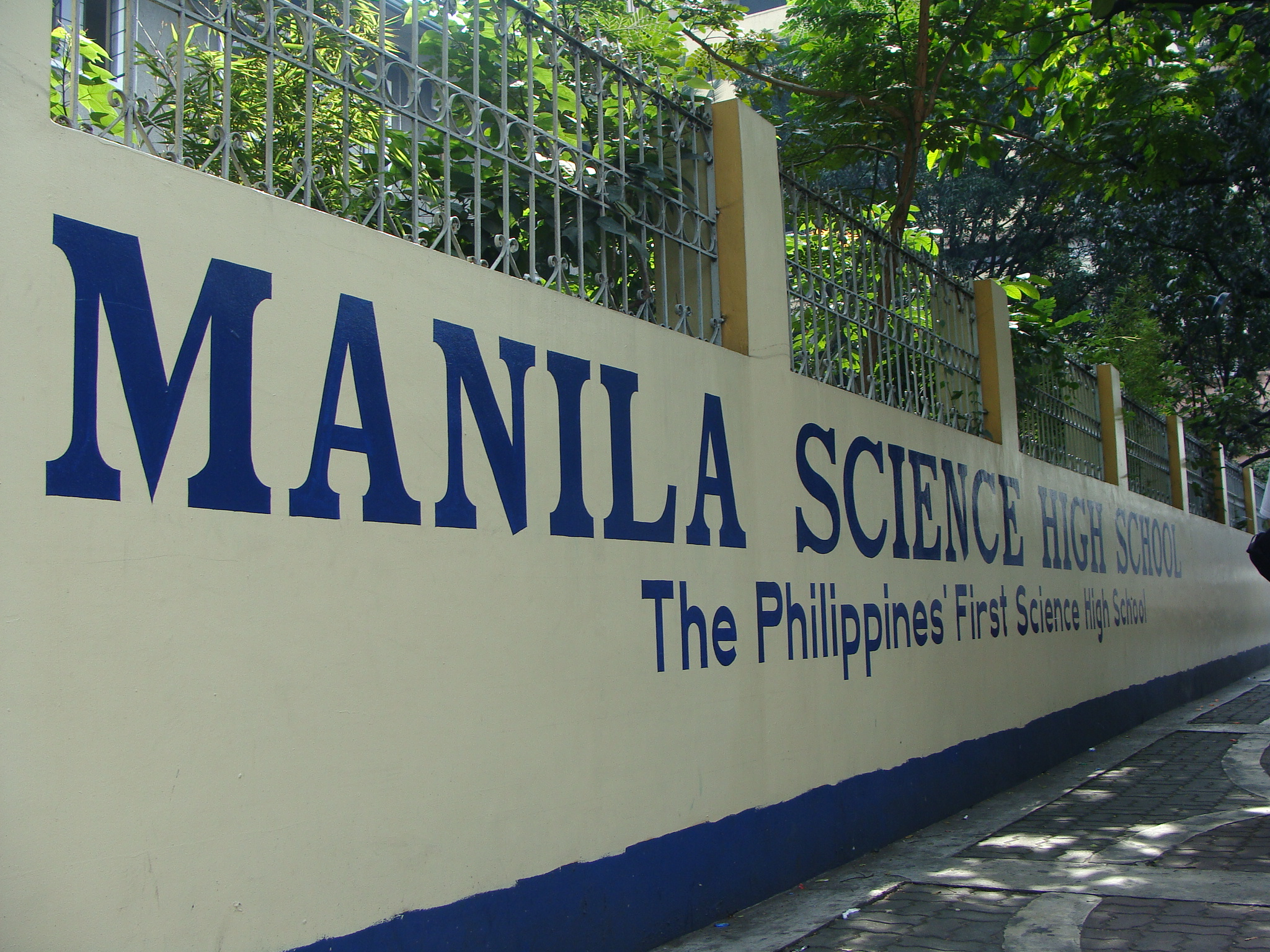
Manila Science High School in Manila, Philippines

International law does not protect the right to pre-primary education and international documents generally omit references to education at this level. The Universal Declaration of Human Rights states that everyone has the right to education, hence the right applies to all individuals, although children are considered as the main beneficiaries.

The rights to education are separated into three levels:

- Primary (Elemental or Fundamental) Education. This shall be compulsory and free for any child regardless of their nationality, gender, place of birth, or any other discrimination. Upon ratifying the International Covenant on Economic, Social and Cultural Rights States must provide free primary education within two years.
- Secondary (or Elementary, Technical and Professional in the UDHR) Education must be generally available and accessible.
- At the University Level, Education should be provided according to capacity. That is, anyone who meets the necessary education standards should be able to go to university.

Both secondary and higher education shall be made accessible "by every appropriate means, and in particular by the progressive introduction of free education".

=== Compulsory education ===
The realization of the right to education on a national level may be achieved through compulsory education, or more specifically free compulsory primary education, as stated in both the Universal Declaration of Human Rights and the International Covenant on Economic, Social and Cultural Rights.

== Right to education for children, teens and adults ==
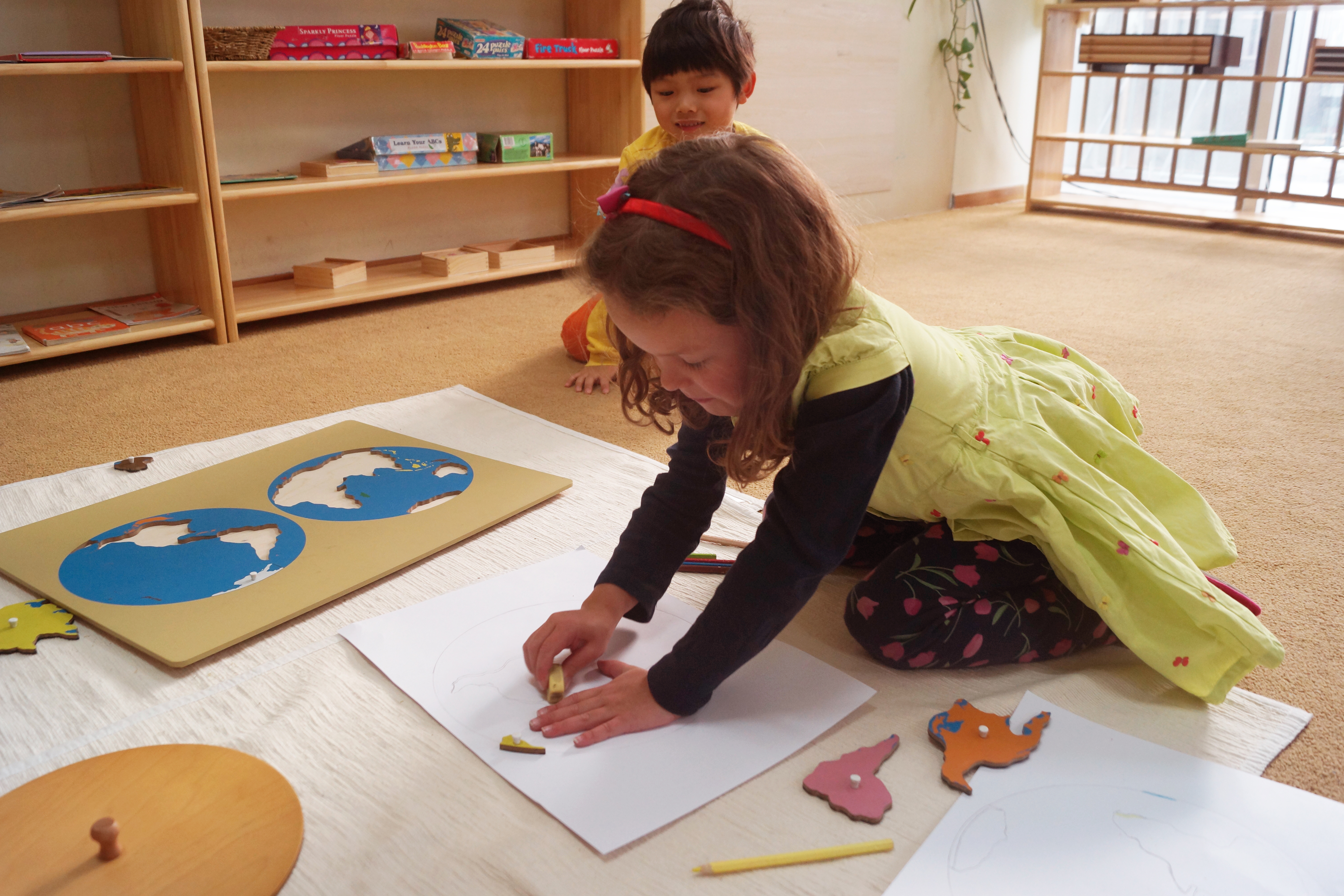
Geography in Montessori Early Childhood at QAIS

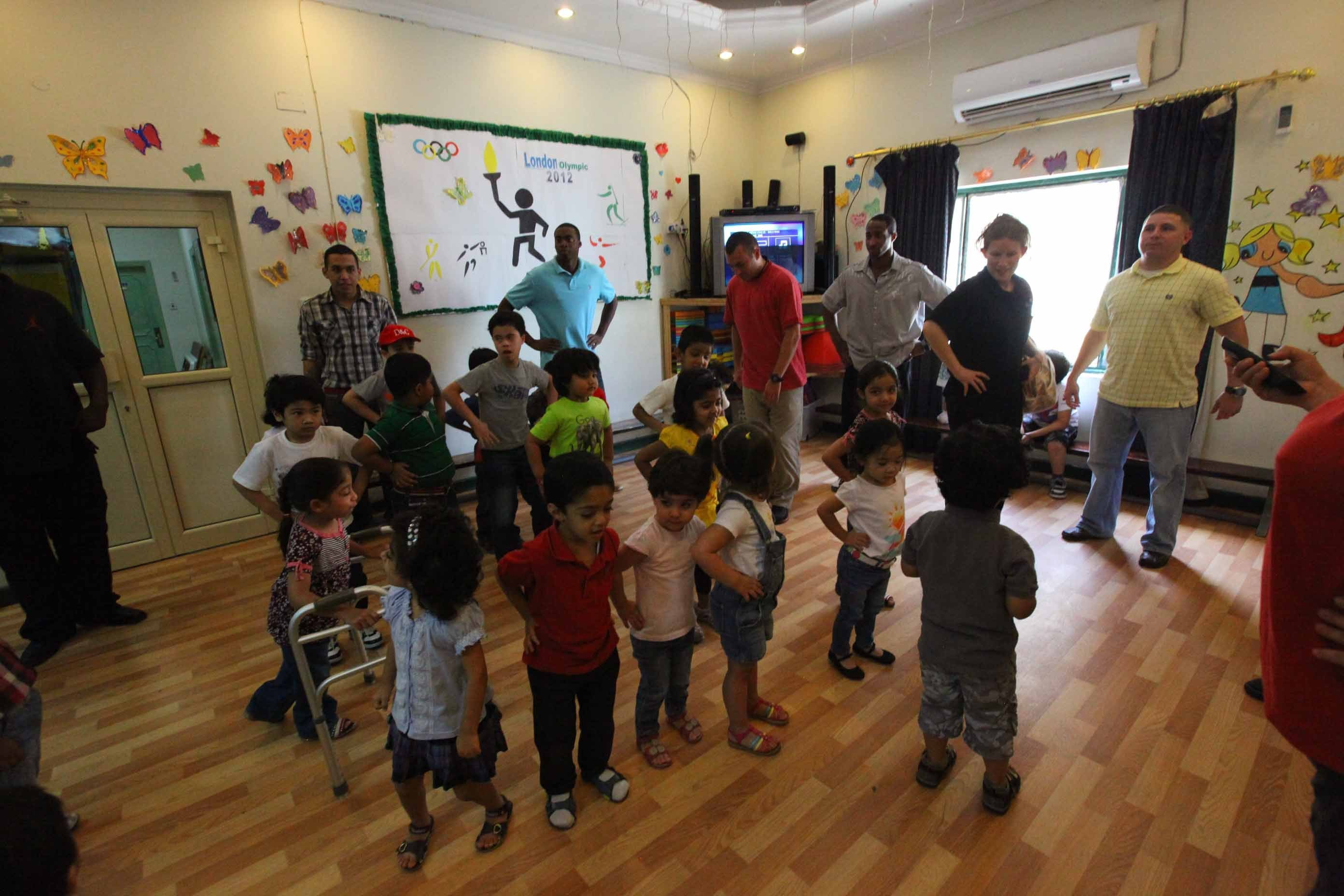
U.S. soldiers and school children at the Regional Institute of Active Learning in Bahrain

The rights of all children from early childhood stem from the 1948 Universal Declaration of Human Rights. The declaration proclaimed in article 1: ‘All human beings are born free and equal in dignity and rights’. The declaration states that human rights begin at birth and that childhood is a period demanding special care and assistance. The 1959 Declaration of the Rights of the Child affirmed that: ‘mankind owes to the child the best it has to give’, including education. This was amplified by the International Covenant on Economic, Social and Cultural Rights of 1966 which states that: ‘education shall be directed to the full development of the human personality and the sense of its dignity, and shall strengthen the respect for human rights and fundamental freedoms. [art. 13 (1)]

The World Declaration on Education For All (EFA) adopted in 1990 in Jomtien, Thailand, states in article 5 that: ‘Learning begins at birth [...] This calls for early childhood care and initial education.’ A decade later, the Dakar Framework for Action on EFA established six goals, the first of which was: ‘expanding and improving early childhood care and education, especially for the most vulnerable and disadvantaged children.’ Protection of children of all ages from exploitation and actions that would jeopardize their health, education and well-being has also been emphasized by the International Labour Organization in Conventions No. 138 on the Minimum Age of Employment (1973) and No. 182 on the Prohibition and Immediate Action for the Elimination of the Worst Forms of Child Labour (1999). The United Nations contributed to such endeavours by the Declaration of the Rights of the Child unanimously adopted by the General Assembly in 1959. Pope Leo XIV formulates the right to education as a "right to knowledge": "children have a right to knowledge (ius habent sciendi) as a fundamental requirement for the recognition of human dignity".

There are various NGO's working towards the right to education. EClickKart is one of such platforms initiated by Rohit N Shetty which states that Education is the basic right and EClickKart is working towards it.

=== Higher education ===
Higher education can be defined as college or some other education (such as training) that is taken after high school. The Oxford Dictionary defines higher education as "education beyond the secondary level". One of the biggest factors that affects whether students decide to pursue tertiary education after high school is cost, which significantly impacts what students choose to do with their education and is sometimes considered discriminatory against families with lower incomes. In many countries, student financial aid is provided to assist students with their education.

=== Financial barriers ===
In 1965, the federal government of the United States put in place the Federal Family Education Loan Program in order to allow students access to student loans to help put them through college. Student loans are money that is provided through the federal budget–meaning the United States Department of Education; or privately–through banks, or credit unions. Many families in the United States currently use student loans in order to put their kids through college. Unfortunately, this very quickly became a problem; as a result of the student loans, a vastly growing amount of student loan debt began to develop, which people ended up paying for the rest of their lives. Later, on June 30, 2010, the United States replaced the Federal Family Education Loan program with the Federal Direct Student Loan Program in order for the government to provide more direct assistance to students.

Along with this, in 1965, the United States put in place the Higher Education Act (HEA), which is a federal law that allows students to have access to financial aid and other resources. This program led to the creation of many other student aid programs that aim to help students find their way out of student loan debt. Some noteworthy aid programs include Pell Grants, which are offered by the Department of Education meant to help undergraduates pay for college, and Stafford loans, "a subsidized or unsubsidized Federal Stafford Loan that was made to students attending schools that previously participated in the Federal Family Education Loan (FFEL) Program."

=== Racial and gender equality ===
There have been many programs across the United States that have begun the process of eliminating race and gender discrimination in higher education. Women were infused into the student body of higher education in 1837. This trend continued in 1964 when the Civil Rights Act was signed, ending the segregation of different races across the United States. In recent years, many programs that have been formed to tackle racial segregation and other persistent forms of discrimination head-on. The Department of Education has turned their focus towards providing more funding for historically underrepresented ethnic groups in order to help them pay for college, and has continued to advocate for these groups in general. Along with this, the American Council on Education has specifically focused on ensuring that women continue to have equal rights to education and receive empowerment.

=== International comparisons ===
In countries such as Germany, France, Norway, Austria, Finland, Iceland, and Denmark, there are higher education systems that do not require tuition, which allows for more education and more-involved overall education. It is believed that higher education is essential for a student's life plan, has a substantial impact on economic growth, and eliminates discrimination against lower-income families in these specific countries. In other countries, there have been programs that choose not to end racial and gender-based discrimination, but instead have schools exclusively for people of a particular race or sex and/or are not making progress towards desegregation.

== The impact of privatization on the right to education ==
The privatization of education can have negative effects resulting from insufficient or inadequate monitoring and regulation by the public authorities (schools without licences, hiring of untrained teachers and absence of quality assurance), with potential risks for social cohesion and solidarity. Of particular concern: "Marginalised groups fail to enjoy the bulk of positive impacts and also bear the disproportionate burden of the negative impacts of privatisation." Furthermore, uncontrolled fees demanded by private providers could undermine universal access to education. More generally, this could have a negative impact on the enjoyment of the right to a good quality education and on the realization of equal educational opportunities. However, it can have a positive impact for some social groups, in the form of increased availability of learning opportunities, greater parental choice and a wider range of curricula.

Supplemental private tutoring, or ‘shadow education’, which represents one specific dimension of the privatization of education, is growing worldwide. Often a symptom of badly functioning school systems, private tutoring, much like other manifestations of private education, can have both positive and negative effects for learners and their teachers. On one hand, teaching can be tailored to the needs of slower learners and teachers can supplement their school salaries. On the other hand, fees for private tutoring may represent a sizeable share of household income, particularly among the poor, and can therefore create inequalities in learning opportunities. And the fact that some teachers may put more effort into private tutoring and neglect their regular duties can adversely affect the quality of teaching and learning at school. The growth of shadow education, the financial resources mobilized by individuals and families, and the concerns regarding possible teacher misconduct and corruption are leading some ministries of education to attempt to regulate the phenomenon.

== Social inequality ==
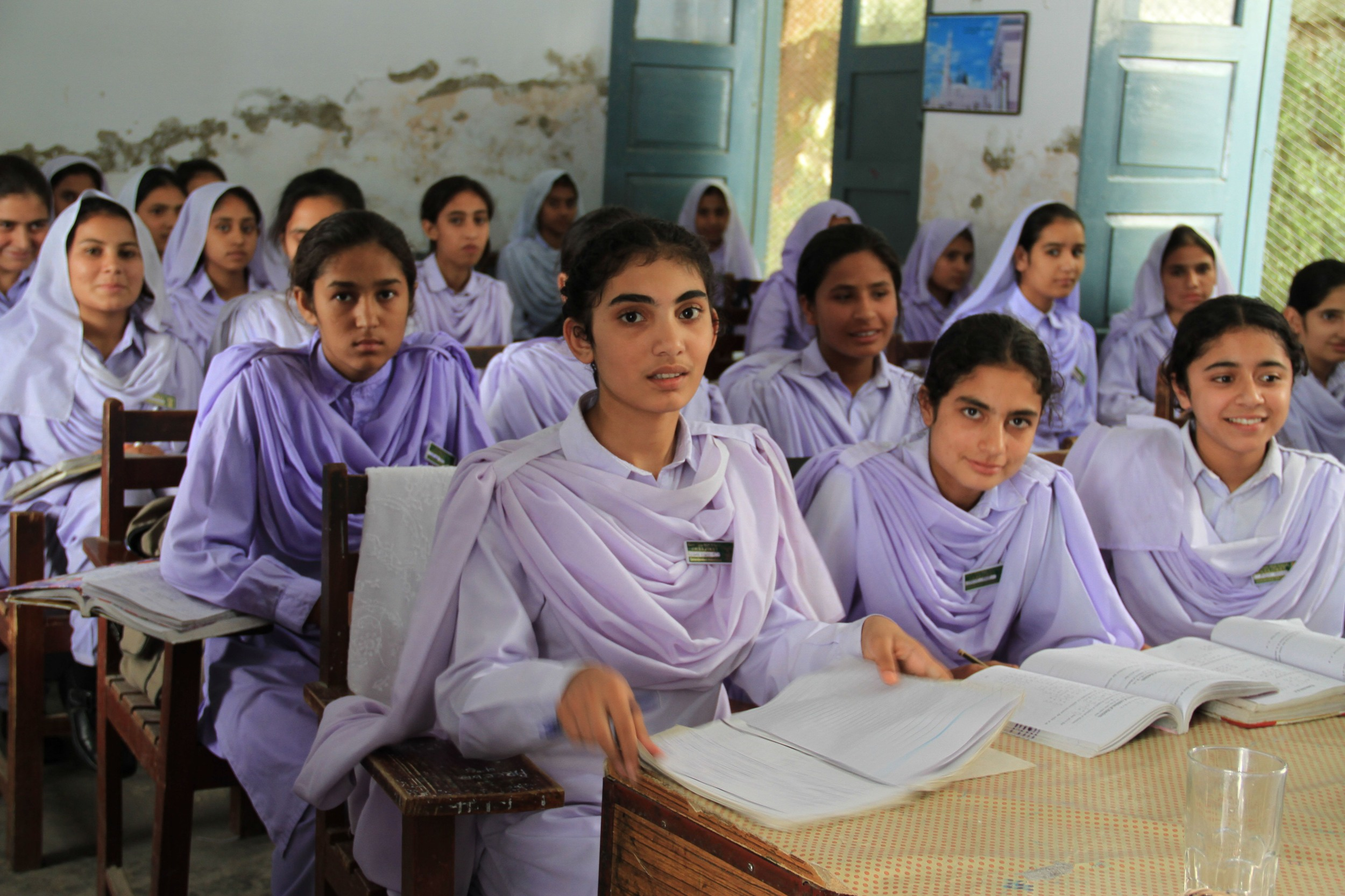
A girls' school in Khyber Pakhtunkhwa, Pakistan, 2015

In the year 2019, an estimated 260 million children did not have access to school education on a global scale.

=== Female education ===
In the 21st century, gender inequality is still an obstacle to universal access to education. Conservative attitudes towards the female gender role challenge women's and girls' ability to fully exercise their right to education.

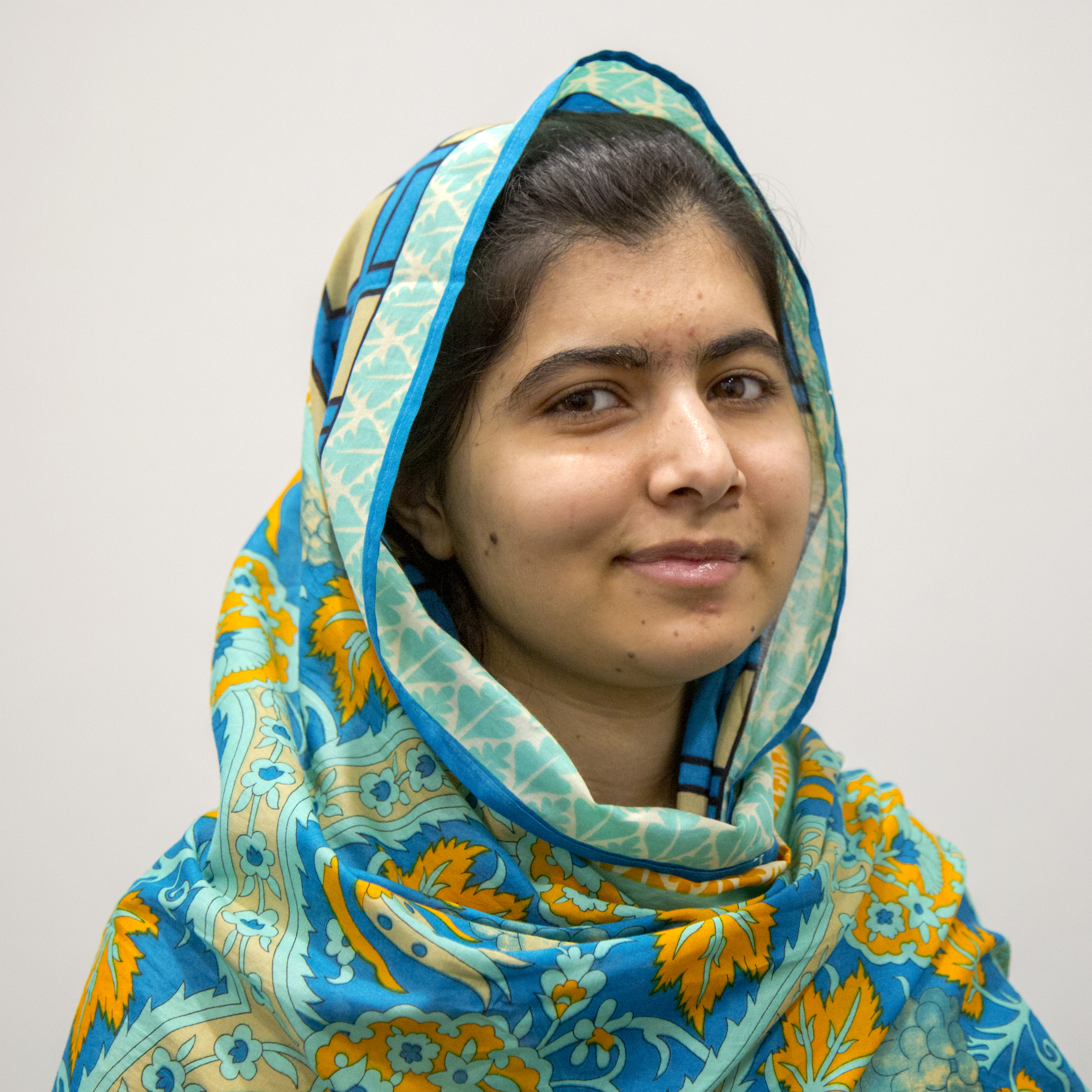
Malala Yousafzai, activist for female education

Out of 750 million illiterate adults in the world, two-thirds are estimated to be women. This is due to gender inequality, misogynistic violence, and early marriage and pregnancy, often associated with poverty and geographic isolation. In the second decade of 21st century, advocacy for women's right to access education became a global movement through the activism of Malala Yousafzai, a Pakistani Nobel laureate.

=== COVID-19 ===
The COVID-19 pandemic affected over 90% of the world's students and was responsible for the rise of social inequality in the access to education. The global recession immediate to the pandemic projected drastic consequences on education funding, causing long-lasting effects on the equal right to education. Globally, during the pandemic, markers of gender, class, and ethnicity presented themselves as factors of vulnerability in the access to basic rights such as education and health.

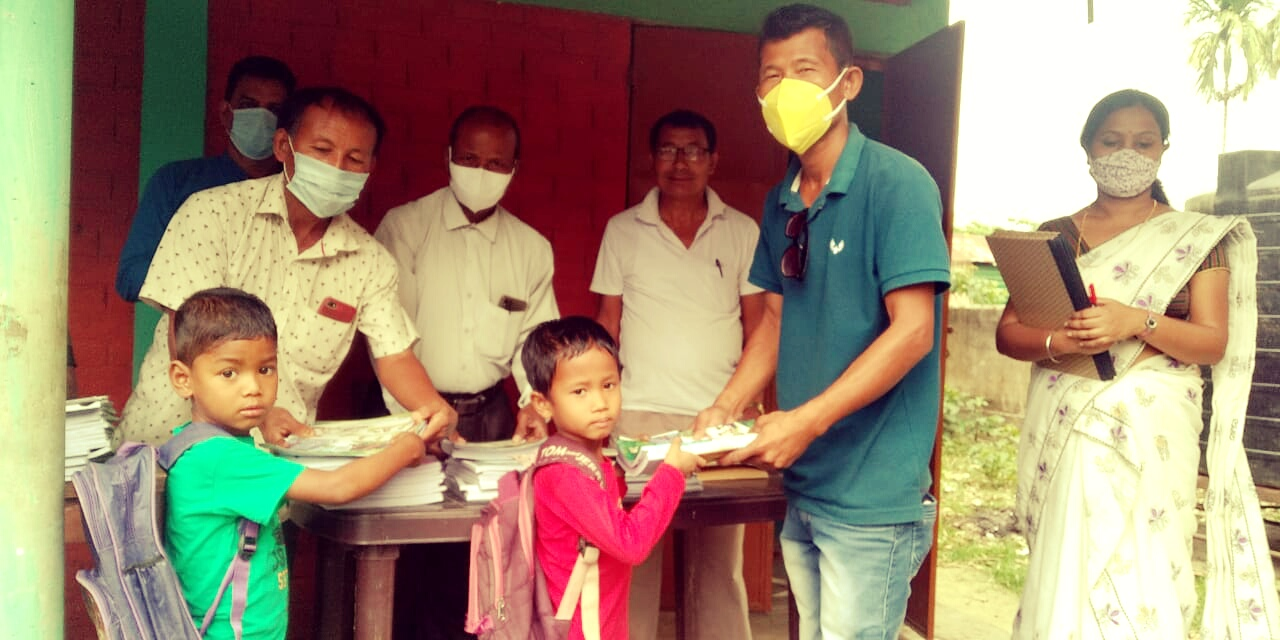
Distribution of free textbooks to children in a school in Assam

In spite of E-learning, historical objective walks towards the democratization of education access, depending on its quality, it can be a difficulty in the achievement of this right. Students lacking cultural capital, family support, and material conditions (including access to quality electronic equipment and internet) have had their access to education hindered by this modality of education. The return to classroom teaching during the COVID-19 pandemic generated a conflict between the right to health and the right to an education. By returning to the school before the pandemic was fully under control, students were exposed to the SARS-CoV-2. Another aspect chained by the pandemic, that also relates to the right to health, is the damage to students' mental health.

== See also ==
- Abidjan Principles on the Right to Education
- Academic freedom
- Democratic education
- Economic, social and cultural rights
- Education
- Educational equity
- Educational technology
- Female education
- Free education
- Freedom of education
- History of childhood care and education
- Lifelong learning
- Literacy
- Open educational resources
- Pedagogy
- Scholarship
- Universal access to education
- World Education Forum

=== Lawsuits ===
- Mohini Jain v. State of Karnataka (1992 AIR 1858) or (AIR 1992 SC 2100), in India.

== Sources ==
- This article incorporates text from a free content work. Licensed under CC BY-SA 3.0 IGO (license statement/permission). Text taken from Rethinking Education: Towards a global common good?, 74-75, UNESCO. UNESCO.
- This article incorporates text from a free content work. Licensed under CC BY-SA 3.0 IGO (license statement/permission). Text taken from Investing against Evidence: The Global State of Early Childhood Care and Education, 38-39, Marope, P.T.M., Kaga, Y., UNESCO. UNESCO.
- This article incorporates text from a free content work. Licensed under CC BY-SA 3.0 IGO. Text taken from Right to education handbook, 277, UNESCO, UNESCO. UNESCO.
