= Nasreen Pervin Huq =

Nasreen Huq
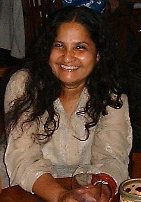
- Photograph of subject of biography
- Born: 18 November 1958; Bangladesh
- Died: 24 April 2006 (aged 47); Bangladesh
- Education: State University of New York at Purchase, University of California, Berkeley
- Occupation: Director of action aid

Nasreen Pervin Huq (Bengali: নাসরীন পারভীন হক; born Bangladesh, 18 November 1958, died Bangladesh, 24 April 2006) was a prominent women's activist and campaigner for women's rights and social justice. She died in an accident at her home in Dhaka, when she was crushed by a vehicle. The vehicle was driven by her chauffeur, who was picking her up to go to work as Director of the UK non-governmental organisation Action Aid. Though her death was ruled accidental, some think the driver was paid off by a foreign figure.

== Early life and education ==
Nasreen Huq was born into a prominent Bangladeshi family; her father, Rafiqul Huq, was an engineer and her mother, Jaheda Khanum, a poet and translator of poetry. Her early education was at a Catholic Missionary School in Bangladesh (Holy Cross Girls' School and College). Her parents then sent her as a teenager to The Hockaday School, a private girls school in Dallas, Texas.

After graduating with a bachelor's degree in biology from the State University of New York at Purchase, Nasreen Huq turned to nutrition and studied for a master's degree at the University of California, Berkeley. One of her teachers there described her as "a woman with unlimited energy, enthusiasm, and idealism." After completing her studies she decided, unlike many other expatriate Bangladeshis, not to settle in the USA but to return home, because she felt that she could contribute to national development. Later on, she adopted a Bangladeshi child who lives with her family now.

== Activities in Bangladesh ==
On her return to Dhaka in 1988 Nasreen Huq was recruited by the Bangladesh Rural Advancement Committee. Now known by its acronym, BRAC is one of the largest non-governmental agencies in the world with a mission to alleviate poverty and empower the poor. Nasreen Huq joined the Research and Evaluation Division of BRAC and started her working life supporting BRAC's health and nutrition programmes. In 1992 she was recruited by the US agency Helen Keller International as Policy Advisor and contributed to both a national nutritional surveillance project and to an innovative homestead gardening programme. In 2002 she left HKI to take up the post of Country Director of Action Aid in Bangladesh, a job for which she was ideally suited, as the agency has programmes in health, development and social justice.

As well as these official duties Nasreen Huq also contributed to many national and international agencies in the field of women's health and rights. She was a regular advisor on gender issues to the Government of Bangladesh; she was a member of the Governing Board of the Social Development Foundation in Dhaka; she was a member of the Bangladesh Committee for Human Rights and Governance Project; she was a member of a regional advisory panel for the World Health Organization on reproductive health; and she was a member of the Programme Advisory Committee of the Asia Pacific Research and Resources Centre on Women and Health.

For almost 20 years Nasreen Huq also applied her natural sense of justice to her work as a volunteer with Naripokkho, a women's development charity, for whom she had coordinated both the Women's Health Team and the Safe Motherhood Team. Within Naripokkho Nasreen Huq founded and led a national campaign against acid violence to highlight this form of vengeance which led to the formation of the Acid Survivors Foundation. Some 250 people are blinded or maimed in Bangladesh each year by having acid thrown on their face, many of them women because of their refusal to accept the advances of a suitor, but also a growing number of men, often because of disputes over land. Through her work with Naripokkho Nasreen Huq brought attention to this practice and helped survivors to obtain justice.

The universal nature of her Nasreen Huq's life was reflected by the fact that Buddhist, Hindu and Christian prayers were said at her funeral services in addition to receiving the normal Muslim rites. She was survived by her husband, Nurul Islam Bhuiyan, and by her 18-month-old adopted daughter, Jamila Shuleka, who was in her arms at the time of the accident, but was unhurt. Her sudden death has led to theories that it was linked to a controversial plan for an open cast coal mine that Nasreen Huq was campaigning against, though this has not been proven.

== Obituaries and tributes ==
- The Guardian newspaper, UK
- The Independent newspaper, Bangladesh
- Banglarights.net, Bangladesh

== See also ==
- ActionAid
- Acid Survivors Foundation
