= British and Commonwealth Women's Association =

- Formation: 1962; 64 years ago
- Type: NGO
- Location: 157 Rue du Faubourg Saint-Honoré, 75008 Paris, France
- Coordinates: 48.87439°N 2.306592°E
- Region served: Paris
- Official language: English
- Website: link

The British and Commonwealth Women's Association is a private members club, based in Paris, for women who are British nationals or Commonwealth citizens.
