= Committee on the Rights of the Child =

Body that monitors implementation of the Convention on the Rights of the Child

- Abbreviation: CRC
- Formation: 1991; 35 years ago
- Type: United Nations Committee
- Legal status: Active
- Headquarters: Geneva, Switzerland
- Head: Chair; Ann Marie Skelton
- Website: ohchr.org/crc

The Committee on the Rights of the Child (CRC) is a body of experts that monitor and report on the implementation of the United Nations Convention on the Rights of the Child.

The committee also monitors the convention's three optional protocols: the Optional Protocol on the Involvement of Children in Armed Conflict, the Optional Protocol on the Sale of Children, Child Prostitution and Child Pornography and the Optional Protocol to the Convention on the Rights of the Child on a Communications Procedure. For the Committee, the "best interests of the child" is a threefold concept: it is a substantive right, a fundamental interpretive legal principle, and a procedural rule.

== History and organization ==
The CRC is one of the ten UN human rights treaty-based bodies. The committee was created by the convention on 27 February 1991. The committee is made up of 18 members from different countries and legal systems who are of 'high moral standing' and experts in the field of human rights. Although members are nominated and elected by States party to the convention, committee members act in a personal capacity. They do not represent their countries' governments or any other organization to which they might belong. Members are elected for a four-year term and can be re-elected if nominated.

The 196 states that have ratified the convention ("States party to the Convention") (which includes all UN member states except the United States, South Sudan ratified on 23 January 2015, Somalia's domestic ratification finished in January 2015 and the instrument was deposited with the United Nations in October 2015.) are required to submit initial and periodic reports on the national situation of children's rights to the committee for examination. The committee examines each report and raises concerns or makes recommendations to the State party. It also issues occasional general comments on the interpretation of particular Convention obligations. Once a year, the committee submits a report to the Third Committee of the United Nations General Assembly, which also hears a statement from the CRC Chair, and the Assembly adopts a Resolution on the Rights of the Child.

Individual complaints of children are based on the third Optional Protocol on Individual Communications and may be considered only under certain conditions by the committee, as is the case with other committees established by international human rights treaties. The case of Gendhun Choekyi Nyima, 11th Panchen Lama, was considered by the committee on 28 May 1996, as well as at other later dates.

There is inquiry procedure based on the Art, 13 of the third Optional Protocol on Individual Communications. The Committee can open an inquiry if it receives a reliable information indicating grave or systematic violations by a State party of child rights.

In November 2014, for the first time, the committee joined with the Convention on the Elimination of All Forms of Discrimination against Women to release a comprehensive interpretation of the obligations of States to prevent and eliminate harmful practices done to women and girls.

=== Members ===
The current members of the Committee on the Rights of the Child are listed on the Web site of the Office of the UN Commissioner for Human Rights. Information on former CRC members is linked from the same Web page. The current president of the committee is Luis Pedernera, a children's rights expert from Uruguay. As of 2022, the committee chair is international human rights lawyer Mikiko Otani.

=== Periodic Report on the Holy See ===
In February 2014 the committee, after interviewing two top officials of the Catholic Church, published observations described as "a scathing indictment of the Vatican's handling of child sexual abuse cases involving clerics, releasing a report that included criticism of church teachings on homosexuality, gender equality and abortion". The Holy See released a critical statement and said that it did not appreciate being asked to change its position on issues it considered immutable. Archbishop Silvano Tomasi, the Holy See's permanent observer at the UN, said that he suspected pro-gay-rights NGOs had influenced the committee and "reinforced an ideological line" in the UN. Advocates for the survivors of clerical sex abuse welcomed the committee's findings.

=== Days of General Discussion ===
Each year, the committee on the Rights of the Child holds an international Day of General Discussion, bringing together experts and civil society members to discuss important children's rights issues with the committee. In 2021, the Day of General Discussion focuses on alternatives to institutional care for children. In particular, it aims to, "Create meaningful engagement for children and young people who have experience of the child protection system and/or of living in alternative care of any type so they can voice their opinions on what constitutes quality care and advocate for legislative and systemic changes."

== See also ==
- Child Helpline International
- The International Centre for Missing & Exploited Children (ICMEC), combats child sexual exploitation, child pornography, and child abduction
