= Capitation fee =

Educational service transaction in India

Capitation fee refers to a transaction in which an organisation that provides educational services collects a fee higher than that approved by regulatory norms. This may be illegal depending on the region or country in which the organisation operates. However, capitation fee collection is legal and regulated in countries such as Ireland and the United Kingdom.

== Definition ==
In the context of Indian law, a capitation fee refers to the collection of payment by educational bodies not included in the prospectus of the institution, usually in exchange for admission to the institution.

The Prohibition of Unfair Practices in Technical Educational Institutions, Medical Institutions and Universities Bill 2010 defines it as any amount that is

- Demanded or charged or collected, directly or indirectly, for, or, on behalf of any institution, or paid by any person in consideration for admitting any person as student in such institution; and which is in excess of the fee payable towards tuition fee and other fees and other charges declared by any institution in its prospectus for admitting any person as student in such institution; or
- Paid or demanded or charged or collected, by way of donation, for, or, on behalf of any institution, or paid by any person in consideration for admitting any person as a student in such institution.

== Prevalence ==
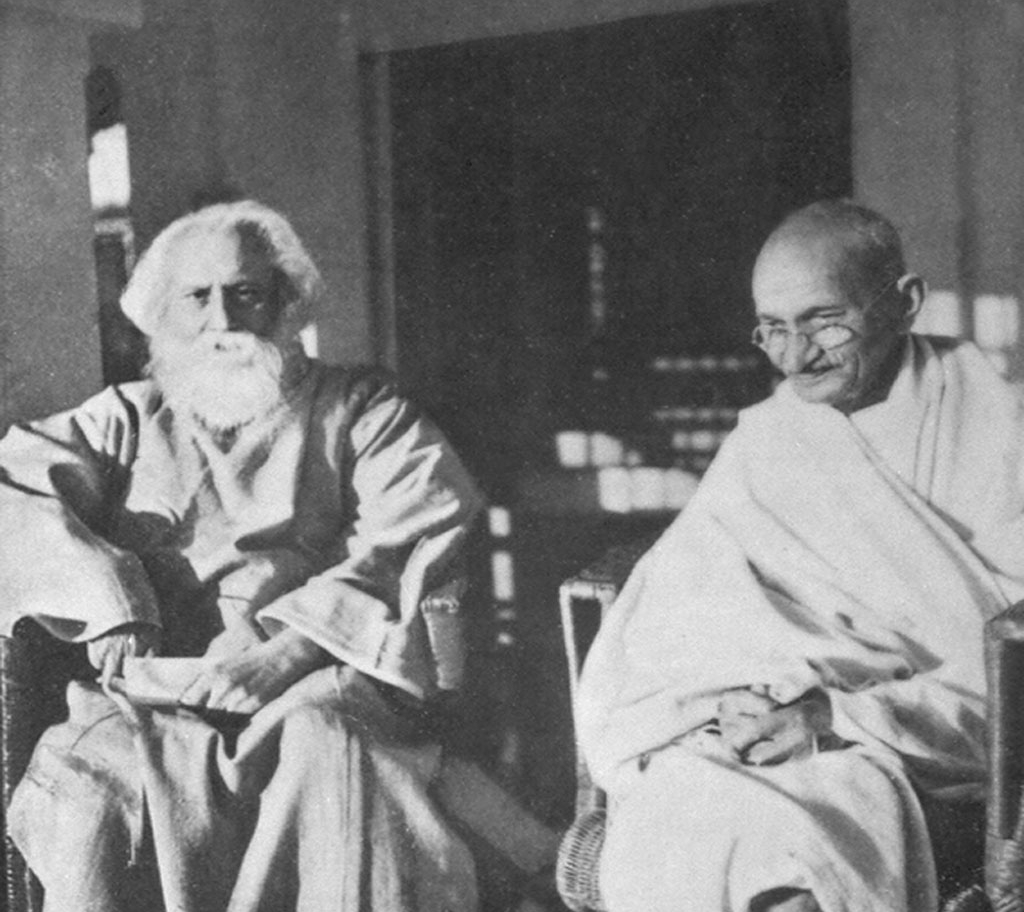
Tagore and Gandhi; 'Knowledge without Character' and 'Commerce without Morality' were social sins for Mahatma Gandhi.

This practice is widely prevalent in private colleges and universities in India, especially those that grant baccalaureate degrees in engineering, IT and sciences for which the demand for admissions exceeds the supply, but a number of technical educations has been closing down in recent years, and many seats go vacant.

== Implications ==
The capitation fee has been one of the major contributors to corruption in education and society. Those who complete their course by paying the capitation fee are looking for a "return on investment". Such attempts to recover investment fuel unethical practices. The capitation fee has been considered to be one of the reason for the exorbitant hike in healthcare costs and deteriorating medical standards.

The capitation fee comes as a surprise to the student when the student may have forsaken admission deadlines at other institutions. Choosing not to pay additional fees may even lead to a form of extortion, by withholding the degree from students. Parents often pay so that there is no ill bearing that affects their wards scores or standing.

The fee might not be uniformly applied. The donation money is often not accounted, and its usage and allocation are mismanaged and not reported to income tax. In such cases of malpractice, students overpay for substandard education.

Students are also misguided. Some institutions add the capitation fee along with the fee approved by regulatory norms. That combined fee is projected as the actual fee to the students.

== Arguments for and against capitation fees ==
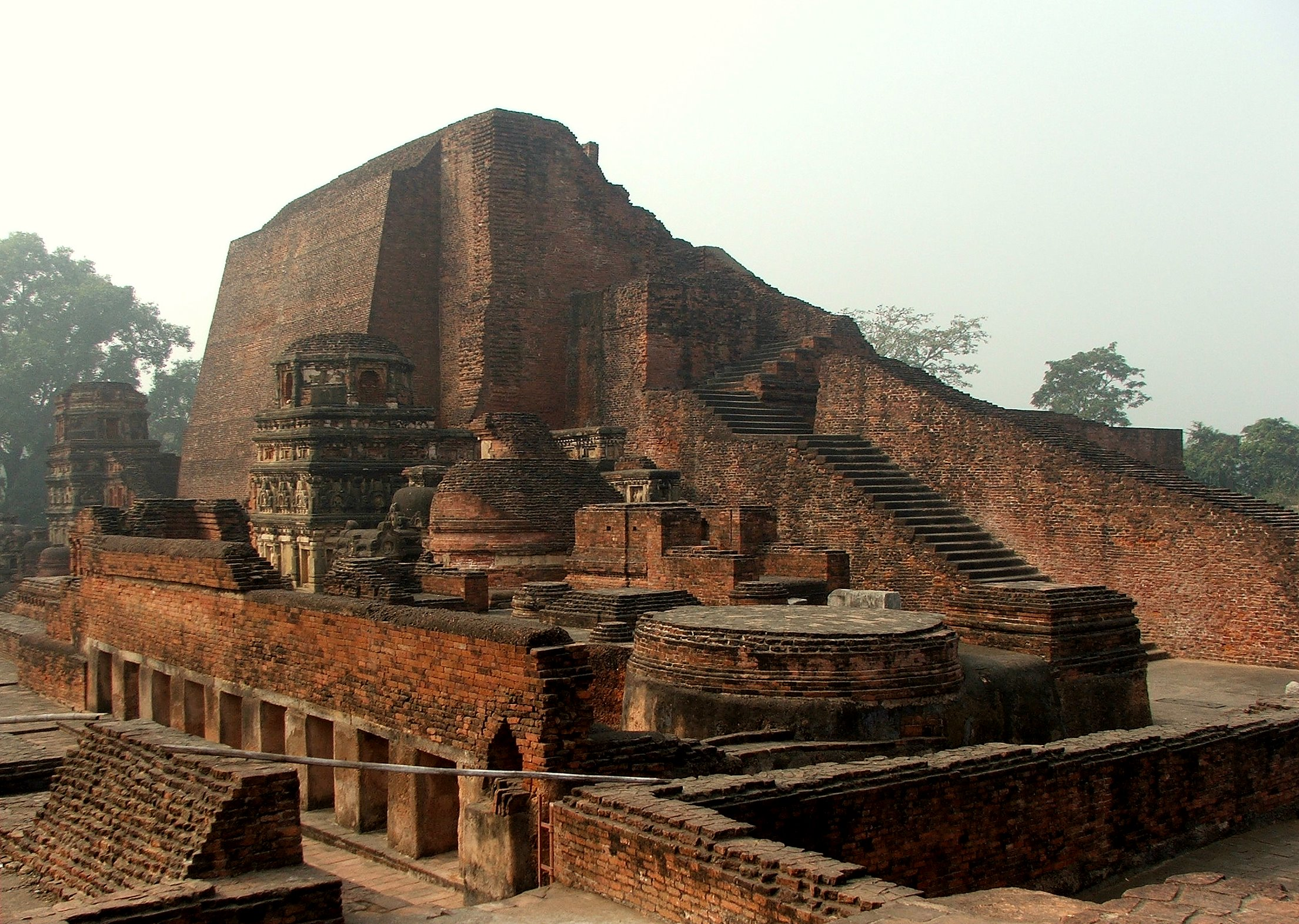
Nalanda, an ancient centre for higher learning; 'Speak the Truth', 'Live Righteousness' says Taittiriya Upanishad ('Sathyam Vada, Dharmam Chara')

Capitation fees are generally seen as a main revenue generator that private institutions may charge, which contend that admissions that cater to affordable sections of society somehow affect the overall number of students educated. The government also controls the seat allocation, number and ratio of management, payment, and free seats. That limits the institutions' ability to raise money through tuition, leaving institutions in need for money. Collecting donations becomes a side effect of government laws that stop institutions from setting their fees, but some parents genuinely donate to improve the infrastructure of their wards' college.

The practice of charging capitation fees by various institutions and universities has been subjected to criticism on various grounds. It has been often referred as 'killing of merit'. In its emphatic judgement in the Mohini Jain V/s State of Karnataka case, the Supreme Court declared that charging of capitation fees was arbitrary, unfair, and in violation of the fundamental right to equality in Article 14 of the Constitution. The Prohibition of Unfair Practices in Technical Educational Institutions, Medical Institutions and Universities Bill 2010 recognized capitation fees as a cognizable offence. On the other hand, various private colleges have defended capitation fees on the grounds that they avail institutions with funds to reinvest in the institution to impart quality education.

Faking News has an article, 'School Principal elected for the coveted 'Business Person of the Year' award', acknowledging the practices of some of the private schools in India, while also noting that "a school principal winning a business award created unrest among the top business leaders in India". However, institutions (business schools, engineering colleges, medical colleges) that take capitation fees also receive significant amount of funding from governmental funding agencies like AICTE, DST, UGC and various ministries under central government and state government. The funds support infrastructure ranging from faculty laptops, printers, lab facilities and trading rooms in business schools.

Educational regulatory agencies, at the national level and at the regional level, have mandated that an institution should include the fees in the prospectus. Institutions have been charging fees from students under various categories. The fee regulatory committee of Karnataka Government has listed 99 different categories through which the institutions may be collecting fee from the students. While fee regulatory agencies fix a fee that cover expenses incurred by an institution along with a basic surplus, many institutions has been charging a fee that makes the venture profiteering.

The National Policy on Education "encourages non-governmental and voluntary efforts in Education, while preventing the establishment of institutions which intend to commercialize Education". While education is not meant to be a commercial practice, corruption in educational institutions has made a noble endeavor such as education into a "notorious business" that has been repeatedly raided by governmental authorities, resulting in identification and seizure of unaccounted wealth.

== Controversies ==
Various renowned and prestigious private schools and colleges across India have been found demanding a capitation fee. It was found that Rs 500,000 was allegedly paid by a student through a demand draft to Sri Venkateswara College of Engineering (SVCE), a private college in Pennalur, Sriperumbudur, near Chennai. The incident came into light through a surprise check drive initiated by the government in Tamil Nadu at 142 self-financing engineering colleges in the state.

Another scam exposed by a popular news channel, Times Now, suggested that Information and Broadcasting Minister for State Jagathrakshakan was allegedly associated with Shree Balaji Medical College in malpractices in admissions. The minister later denied having associated with the college. Jagathrakshakan said, "I have never been the Chairman. Once I was a trustee. Before election I quit. I have absolutely no connection with the college or the trust". In February 2002, students filed a case against Mercedes Benz International School, a prestigious school in Pune for allegedly collecting 'capitation fees' under the guise of a building donation fund.

The Income Tax Department has been conducting raids on some of the organisations that take a capitation fee. Arrests have been made related to cheating associated with admissions.

== Legal implications ==
The Prohibition of Unfair Practices in Technical Educational Institutions, Medical Institutions and Universities Bill 2010 was introduced as a strict measure to bring about the transparency in the educational system regarding the fee structures and other crucial issues. Charging or accepting a capitation fee is considered as violation of Provision 6, which prohibits any institution from demanding or accepting capitation fee, directly or indirectly.

If found guilty, the institution will be liable to a penalty of up to Rs.5,000,000 and maximum imprisonment for three years. The bill has been criticized by various private institutions essentially for restricting the autonomy of the institution in such matters. J Philip, President, Xavier Institute of Management Education, Bangalore and former director, IIM – Bangalore, said, "The Bill promises to be beneficial. But it also runs the risk of curbing the autonomy and the freedom of institutions and challenge dynamic functioning. Again, it could be misused by students or anyone trying to settle scores". However, the bill lapsed before it became a law.

Media reports indicate that black money in education in India generates more than 40,000 crores, and black money generation in medical education is more than 10,000 crores. The Special Investigation Team (SIT) probing into black money practices in India has started its probe into the area, which was outside the ambit of SIT.

== Suggestions to curb practice ==
Concerns have been raised on how a capitation fee has been charged in the name of donations. Issues related to capitation fee has been reported from many regions in India, and may be traced to the 1980s or 1970s. In 1990, “capitation fee” was “prevalent in a number of colleges of the country”. Educational institutions are exempted from paying taxes that are similar to the tax paid by for-profit companies. Educational institutions are usually managed by a 'charitable trust', society, etc. Corporate tax in India in late 2010s was approximately 25-30%, and a higher tax rate was prevalent in the 1980s, 1990s and early 2000s.

In August 2014, the Supreme Court appointed Mr Salman Khurshid, former Union Law Minister, as an amicus curiae and asked him to come out with suggestions and methodologies to end this practice.

In addition to stringent legal actions, other practices that government can adopt to curb the practice include the following:
(1) Audited financial statements of educational institutions and the 'charitable trusts' that owns these institutions, to be made available in the website of the institutions and trusts, on an annual basis.
(2) Funding organisations like DST, UGC, AICTE, Ministry of Education and other ministries under the central and state governments should stop funding research projects and programmes in institutions taking a capitation fee.
(3) Revoking exemptions or cancelling registrations of these organisations that take capitation fee
(4) Articles in a leading international medical journal discussing about the capitation fee practices in medical colleges in India suggested that those who complete their courses from a capitation fee taking colleges should not be allowed for postings abroad.
(5) Instituting a maximum fee has been discussed. For example, Sri Krishna committee has recommended a fee band for professional colleges, with an upper limit for the fee that can be taken.
(6) A centralised fee collection process, with a time-bound mechanism to channelise the collected fee to the institutes.
(7) A single common entrance exam for each of the courses (medicine, engineering, pharmacy, hotel management, business management, law and other courses).

== Student advisory ==
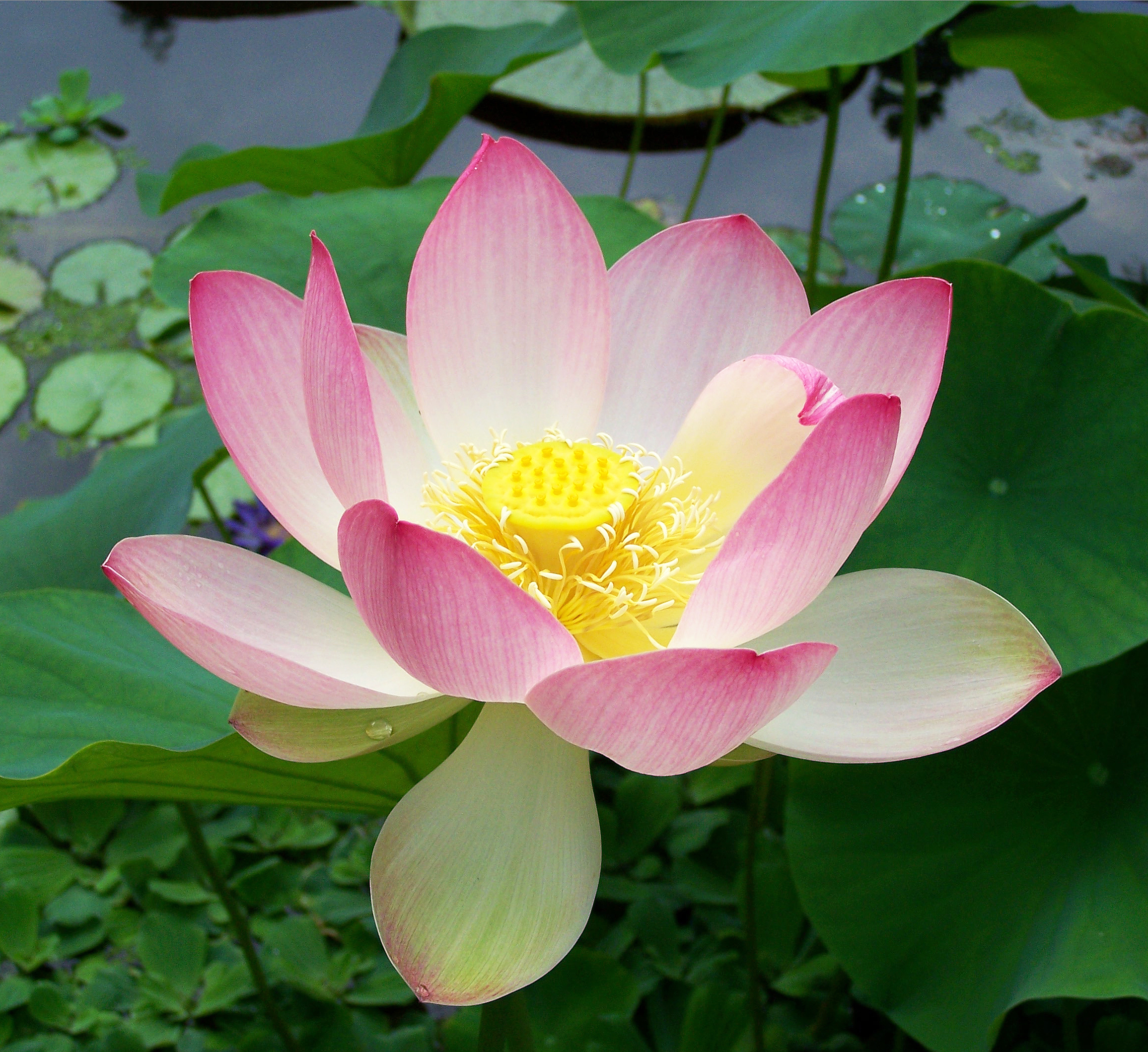
Indian Ethos considers education to be a sacred endeavor.

=== Technical Education / Higher Education ===
The All India Council for Technical Education (AICTE), the regulatory body for technical education in India, has called "upon the students, parents and the general public not to pay any capitation fee or any other fee other than that mentioned in the Prospectus of the Institutions for consideration of admission". The AICTE also mentions that the fee charged from students, including for programs such as PGDM, must approved by the fee regulatory committee of the state, and the institute should mention the fee in its website. As per AICTE norms, business schools are not meant to charge a fee higher than mentioned in the prospectus. Educational regulatory agencies, at the national level and also at the regional level, have mandated that an institution should include the fee in the prospectus.

=== School education ===
Central Board of Secondary Education (CBSE) states that a school should be run as a service, not a business, and that commercialization does not take place in a school. The Board has mentioned, "No capitation fee or voluntary donations for gaining admission in the school or for any other purpose should be charged/collected in the name of the school. In case of such malpractices, the Board may take drastic action leading to disaffiliation of the school". The school is also punishable with a fine that may extend to ten times the capitation fee charged. CBSE has issued notification/s asking schools affiliated to CBSE to mention fee details in the school website, and also in the CBSE website. Similar notifications have been released by regional educational departments.
