= World's Children's Prize for the Rights of the Child =

Swedish non-profit organization

The World’s Children’s Prize for the Rights of the Child was founded in 2000 and is run by the World's Children's Prize Foundation (WCPF), based in Mariefred, Sweden.

The WCPF is a non-profit organisation, independent of all political and religious affiliation, and run with support from bodies including the Swedish Postcode Lottery and the Swedish International Development Cooperation Agency.

== Patrons ==
Patrons of the World's Children's Prize include Malala Yousafzai, the late Nelson Mandela from South Africa, Democracy Champion, and Freedom Fighter Xanana Gusmão, from East Timor. Its patrons also include Queen Silvia of Sweden, Graça Machel and Desmond Tutu. Artists Loreen and Vusi "The Voice" Mahlasele are also patrons.

== Laureates ==
Since the launch of the program in 2000, more than 55 Prize Laureates have been awarded the World's Children's Prize.

Year	Award type	Nominee	Country
2000		Anne Frank (posthumously)	
2000	Honorary Award	Hector Pieterson (posthumously)	South Africa
2000	Honorary Award	Iqbal Masih (posthumously)	Pakistan
2001		Asfaw Yemiru	Ethiopia
2001	Honorary Award	Barefoot College (Bunker Roy)	India
2001	Honorary Award	The Children's Peace Movement	Colombia
2002		Casa Alianza	South America
2002		Maiti Nepal (Anuradha Koirala)	Nepal
2003		James Aguer Alic	South Sudan
2003		Maggy Barankitse	Burundi
2003		Pastoral das Crianças	Brazil
2004	Honorary Award	Emani Davis	United States
2004		Paul and Mercy Baskar	India
2004		Prateep Ungsongtham Hata	Thailand
2005		Dunga Mothers	Kenya
2005		Nelson Mandela	South Africa
2005		Nkosi Johnson (posthumously)	South Africa
2006		AOCM	Rwanda
2006		Craig Kielburger	Canada
2006	Honorary Award	Ana María Marañon de Bohorquez	Bolivia
2006		Jetsun Pema	India (Tibet)
2007		Betty Makoni	Zimbabwe
2007	Honorary Award	Cynthia Maung	Thailand, Burma, Myanmar
2007	Honorary Award	Inderjit Khurana	India
2008		Agnes Stevens	United States
2008	Honorary Award	Josefina Condori	Peru
2008		Somaly Mam	Cambodia
2009	World's Children's Prize Decade Child Rights Hero	Graça Machel	South Africa
2011		Cecilia Flores-Oebanda	Philippines
2011		Monira Rahman	Bangladesh
2011		Murhabazi Namegebe, D.R.	Congo
2012		Anna Mollel	Tanzania
2012		Ann Skelton	South Africa
2012		Sakena Yacoobi	Afghanistan
2013		James Kofi Annan	Ghana
2013	Honorary Award	Kimmie Weeks	Liberia
2013	Honorary Award	Sompop Jantraka	Thailand
2014		Indira Ranamagar	Nepal
2014		John Wood	United States
2014		Malala Yousafzai	Pakistan
2015		Javier Stauring	United States
2015		Kailash Satyarthi	India
2015		Prateep Ungsongtham Hata	Thailand
2017		Manuel Rodrigues	Guinea Bissau
2017		Molly Melching	Guinea, Guinea-Bissau, Mali, Mauritania, Senegal and Gambia
2017		Rosi Gollmann	India and Bangladesh
2018		Gabriel Mejía Montoya	Colombia
2018		Rachel Lloyd	United States
2018		Einar	Romania
2019		Ashok Dayalchand	India
2019	Honorary Award	Spès Nihangaza	Burundi
2019	Honorary Award	Guylande Mésadieu	Haiti

== Oversight ==
The World's Children's Prize Foundation is regulated by Svensk Insamlingskontroll (Swedish Fundraising Control), which monitors charitable fundraising.
