= Chitwan 1 =

Parliamentary constituency in Nepal

- Parliamentary constituency
- Chitwan 1 in Bagmati Province
- Province: Bagmati Province
- District: Chitwan District

Current constituency
- Created: 1991
- Party: Rastriya Swatantra Party
- Member of Parliament: Hari Dhakal

Chitwan 1 is one of three parliamentary constituencies of Chitwan District in Nepal. This constituency came into existence on the Constituency Delimitation Commission (CDC) report submitted on 31 August 2017.

== Incorporated areas ==
Chitwan 1 parliamentary constituency incorporates Rapti Municipality, Khairahani Municipality and Ratnanagar Municipality.

== Assembly segments ==
It encompasses the following Bagmati Provincial Assembly segment

- Chitwan 1(A)
- Chitwan 1(B)

== Members of Parliament ==
=== Parliament/Constituent Assembly ===
Election	Member	Party
1991	Jagrit Prasad Bhetwal	CPN (Unified Marxist–Leninist)
1999	Sabitri Bogati	Nepali Congress
2008	Lalmani Chaudhary	CPN (Unified Marxist–Leninist)
2013	Surendra Prasad Pandey	CPN (Unified Marxist–Leninist)
May 2018	Surendra Prasad Pandey	Nepal Communist Party
March 2021	Surendra Prasad Pandey	CPN (Unified Marxist–Leninist)
2022	Hari Dhakal	Rastriya Swatantra Party
2026	Hari Dhakal	Rastriya Swatantra Party

=== Provincial Assembly ===
==== 1(A) ====
Election	Member	Party
2017	Dawa Dorje Lama	CPN (Unified Marxist–Leninist)
May 2018	Dawa Dorje Lama	Nepal Communist Party

==== 1(B) ====
Election	Member	Party
2017	Krishna Prasad Sharma Khanal	CPN (Unified Marxist–Leninist)
May 2018	Krishna Prasad Sharma Khanal	Nepal Communist Party
March 2021	Krishna Prasad Sharma Khanal	CPN (Unified Marxist–Leninist)
August 2021	Krishna Prasad Sharma Khanal	CPN (Unified Socialist)

== Election results ==
=== Election in the 2020s ===
==== 2022 general election ====
Candidate	Party	Votes	%
Hari Dhakal	Rastriya Swatantra Party	34,218	37.39
Surendra Prasad Pandey	CPN (UML)	26,634	29.10
Biswo Nath Poudel	Nepali Congress	25,022	27.34
Madhup Kumar Bhattarai	Rastriya Prajatantra Party	2,751	3.01
Bishnu Lama	Independent	1,421	1.55
Others		1,468	1.60
Total		91,514	100.00
Majority		7,584	
Rastriya Swatantra Party gain			

=== Election in the 2010s ===
==== 2017 legislative elections ====
Party	Candidate	Votes
CPN (Unified Marxist–Leninist)	Surendra Prasad Pandey	51,080
Nepali Congress	Rajendra Prasad Burlakoti	35,360
Others		1,464
Invalid votes		1,848
Result	CPN (UML) hold	
Source: Election Commission

==== 2017 Nepalese provincial elections ====
===== Chitwan 1(A) =====
Party	Candidate	Votes
CPN (Unified Marxist–Leninist)	Dawa Dorje Lama	23,023
Nepali Congress	Dhan Bahadur Gurung	15,994
Others		1,105
Invalid votes		821
Result	CPN (UML) gain	
Source: Election Commission

===== Chitwan 1(B) =====
Party	Candidate	Votes
CPN (Unified Marxist–Leninist)	Krishna Prasad Sharma Khanal	27,233
Nepali Congress	Uttam Prasad Acharya	18,511
Others		2,058
Invalid votes		1,047
Result	CPN (UML) gain	
Source: Election Commission

==== 2013 Constituent Assembly election ====
Party	Candidate	Votes
CPN (Unified Marxist–Leninist)	Surendra Prasad Pandey	18,760
Nepali Congress	Rajendra Prasad Burlakoti	13,745
UCPN (Maoist)	Yam Bahadur Pariyar	4,715
Sanghiya Loktantrik Rastriya Manch (Tharuhat)	Tekendra Chaudhary	1,293
Others		2,644
Result	CPN (UML) hold	
Source: NepalNews

=== Election in the 2000s ===
==== 2008 Constituent Assembly election ====
Party	Candidate	Votes
CPN (Unified Marxist–Leninist)	Lal Mani Chaudhary	17,971
CPN (Maoist)	Sobha Kattel	14,249
Nepali Congress	Sabitri Bogati	8,688
CPN (Marxist–Leninist)	Kapil Dev Pokharel	1,753
Rastriya Prajatantra Party	Sant Kumar Chaudhary	1,414
Others		1,126
Invalid votes		2,444
Result	CPN (UML) gain	
Source: Election Commission

=== Election in the 1990s ===
==== 1999 legislative elections ====
Party	Candidate	Votes
Nepali Congress	Sabitri Bogati	19,087
CPN (Unified Marxist–Leninist)	Jagrit Prasad Bhetwal	18,176
Rastriya Prajatantra Party	Sant Kumar Chaudhary	5,205
CPN (Marxist–Leninist)	Krishna Raj Pant	1,184
Others		849
Invalid Votes		968
Result	Congress gain	
Source: Election Commission

==== 1994 legislative elections ====
Party	Candidate	Votes
CPN (Unified Marxist–Leninist)	Jagrit Prasad Bhetwal	15,924
Nepali Congress	Chuda Mani Chaudhary	12,023
Rastriya Prajatantra Party	Ram Sharan Pathak	6,336
Others		416
Result	CPN (UML) hold	
Source: Election Commission

==== 1991 legislative elections ====
Party	Candidate	Votes
CPN (Unified Marxist–Leninist)	Jagrit Prasad Bhetwal	25,784
Nepali Congress	Shesh Nath Adhikari	16,459
Result	CPN (UML) gain	

== See also ==
- List of parliamentary constituencies of Nepal
