= Surendra Prasad Pandey =

Nepali politician

- सुरेन्द्र प्रसाद पाण्डे

Member of Parliament, Pratinidhi Sabha
- In office 4 March 2018 – 18 September 2022
- Constituency: Chitwan 1

Member of Constituent Assembly
- In office 21 January 2014 – 14 October 2017
- Preceded by: Lal Mani Chaudhary
- Constituency: Chitwan 1

Member of Constituent Assembly for CPN (UML) party list
- In office 28 May 2008 – 28 May 2012

Member of Parliament, Rastriya Sabha
- In office 27 June 1997 – 26 June 2003

Personal details
- Born: 25 September 1958 (age 67)
- Party: CPN (UML)

Surendra Prasad Pandey is a Nepalese politician, belonging to the Nepal Communist Party currently serving as the member of the 1st Federal Parliament of Nepal. In the 2017 Nepalese general election he was elected from the Chitwan 1 constituency, securing 51080 (58.11%) votes.
