= Sugarcane Drought Tolerant strain NXI-4T =

Sugarcane drought tolerant strain NXI-4T has a resistance to drought. This sugarcane was developed by PT Riset Perkebunan Nusantara (Translation: Nusantara Plantation Research) which co-operates with Jember University. This strain already have been approved by Indonesian Agricultural Ministry.

== Morphology ==
This strain has purple stem, green non-hairy leaves.

== Genetic Modification Techniques ==
This strain was modified using Agrobacterium tumefaciens and plasmid pMHL2113. Agrobacterium transferred the betA gene from Rhizobium meliloti.

PTPN XI estimates total GE sugarcane planting area for 2021 reached 13,000 hectares. Previously, this GE sugarcane could only be cultivated on lands owned by PTPN XI, and its seeds were not freely available to other farmers for planting due to the lack of certification. In 2022, the Indonesian Sugar Research Institute certified the GE sugarcane seed, and it is currently available for general commercialization.
