= Bahauddin Zakariya University College of Textile Engineering, Multan =

Textile engineering college in Multan

Coordinates: 30.2202°N 71.5402°E

Bahauddin Zakariya University College of Textile Engineering, also known as BZU college of textile engineering, is an institute in southern Punjab, which provides engineering degrees in the field of textile. It is situated on 6-km Khanewal road in Multan, Pakistan.

Multan is not only famous as the most ancient city of South Asia but also skills of its artisan & craftsman in the sector of pottery, textile, leather, embroidery products etc. On the top of the above Multan is also at the heart of cotton growing area. Cotton is raw material for Textile products which is also synonym to white gold that indeed is back bone of the economy of Pakistan and contributes more than 57% of overall exports.

== History ==
Initially it was an Institute of Hand Loom and Home Textile Technology, which was a project of the Export Promotion Bureau and the Ministry of Science and Technology, established in 1996. The institute was offering 3-years diploma in textile for providing skilled workforce to the industry. In 2004, the status of the institute was elevated to an engineering college by handing it over to Bahauddin Zakariya University Multan. Before the takeover, there was no institute in southern Punjab that offered a textile engineering degree.

== Programs ==
Programs running at present are:

1. B.Sc. Textile Engineering (4 year program) in all four disciplines including Yarn Manufacturing, Fabric Manufacturing, Wet Processing (Dyeing & Finishing), Garments Manufacturing, accredited by PEC and started in 2004.
2. M.Sc. Textile Engineering (2 year program) started in 2015.

Lab Facilities:

The college has got sufficient lab facilities for conventional textile. The department got a lot of benefit from Higher Education Commission Funding for lab equipment and human resource development.

Yarn Manufacturing

Conversion of fibre to yarn is a basic process of woven and knitted fabrics. The state-of-the-art machines from Rieter Switzerland are installed in the yarn manufacturing laboratory. This is complete laboratory for yarn manufacturing. It consists of Unifloc A11, Uniclean B12, Unimix B71, Uniflex B60, Vission Sheild (Jossi). Condenser A21, Hi Per Card C60, RSB-D 40 draw frame, F15 roving, G 35 ring frame and Autoconer 338RM.

Fabric Manufacturing

Next process in the textile production is fabric manufacturing. Fabric Manufacturing laboratory has variety of weaving machines from hand loom to high speed air jet loom. This laboratory consist of dobby and jacquard hand looms, dobby and jacquard shuttle looms, terry towel looms, rapier dobby and jacquard looms, air jet loom, sectional warping machine and sizing machine.

Wet Processing

Third process in textile manufacturing is dyeing, printing and finishing. The laboratory scale machines are installed in the Wet Processing Laboratory. This includes all sort of dyeing and printing machines.

Garment Manufacturing

The finished fabric is used to manufacture garment and apparel. This laboratory includes all sorts of industrial cutting, sewing, over-locking, interlocking and embroidery machines.

Textile Testing and Quality Control

Textile Testing laboratory is most important laboratory for testing the textile product and for quality assurance. This laboratory includes; USTER HVI – 1000, USTER AFIS Pro- II, USTER Tester 5, USTER Tensorapid 4, USTER Autosorter, twist testers, fabric strength testers, crease recovery tester, fabric stiffness tester, tearing strength tester and much more.

Microscopy and Colour Measurement

Microscopes are used to observe the physical parameters of fibre, yarn, fabric and other textile product which cannot be observed with necked eyes. Colour measurement and matching is a common feature of dyeing and printing processes. This laboratory includes different types of optical and video microscopes, Colour Eye and other colour measuring equipments.

CAD/CAM

A CAD/CAM laboratory has been established with 15 working stations. This laboratory is used to create weave and print designs which are transferred on weaving, knitting and printing machines.

Chemistry

Chemistry laboratory has been established.

Physics

Computer

Computer laboratory has 45 work stations. All computers are connected with Internet. This laboratory is used by the students for practical work of computer related subjects and for internet.

Workshops

There are six workshops viz., Machine Shop, Forging Shop, Fitting Shop, Foundry Shop, Woodwork Shop, Electrical Shop and Electronics Shop. These workshops are equipped with latest machines and equipment.

Library

The College Library has more than 12000 Books on different fields of textile and related subjects.

Sports

There are cricket, football and volleyball grounds in the premises of the college.

== Faculty ==
Currently, there are eight foreign qualified PhD's and four M-Phil faculty members in the college as well as some visiting teachers.
