= Dwi Rubiyanti Kholifah =

Indonesian Women's rights leader and Human rights activist

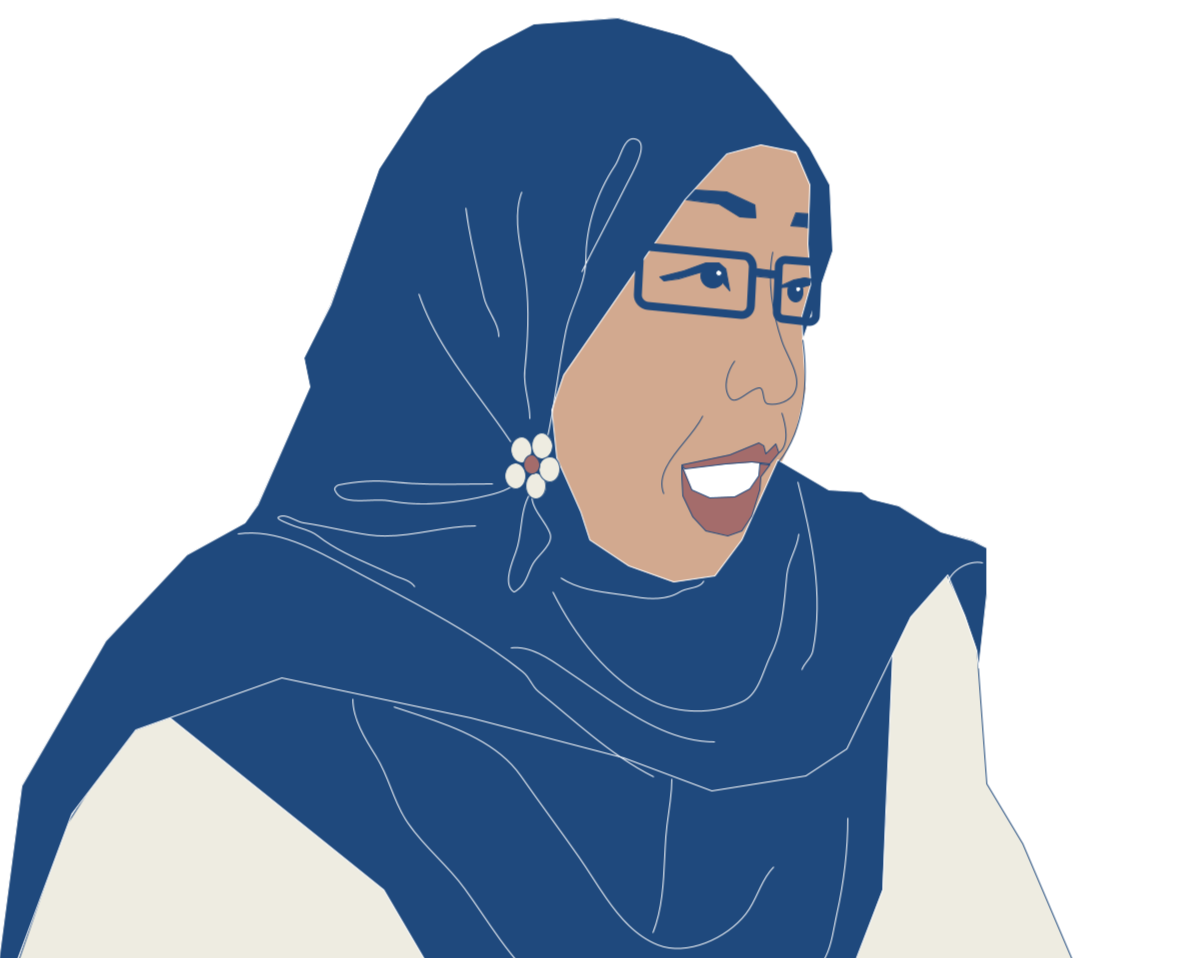
- Other name: Ruby Kholifah
- Education: Universitas Jember, Mahidol University
- Known for: Women's rights leader and Human rights activist
- Notable work: Indonesia's director for the Asian Muslim Action Network

Dwi Rubiyanti Kholifah, commonly known as Ruby Kholifah, is an Indonesian Women's rights leader and Human rights activist. She is the Indonesian director of the Asian Muslim Action Network (AMAN).

== Biography ==
Kholifah was born and raised in Indonesia, and completed a bachelor's degree in literature from Universitas Jember, Indonesia and a master's degree in health and social science at Mahidol University in Thailand, where she studied the sexual health and practices of young women in traditional Islamic schools (Pesantren). She has also been an activist with the Nahdlatul Ulama. She joined the Asian Muslim Action Network in 2005 as coordinator of the research fellowship program.

She is Indonesia's director for the Asian Muslim Action Network, focusing on women in peacebuilding and interfaith cooperation. In 2014 she was selected as an Asia Foundation Development Fellow. In 2016 she was recipient of the N-Peace Award. In December 2025, she was awarded the Franco-German Prize for Human Rights and the Rule of Law. She has spoken out about such topics as the wearing of the Hijab, rights for victims of Rape, interfaith relations, Terrorism, rights for the Ahmadiyya minority, Transgender rights, and other issues.

== Recognition ==
She was recognized as one of the BBC's 100 women of 2014.

== Publications ==
- Kholifah, D. R. (2010). Contesting discourses on sexuality and sexual subjectivity among single young Muslim women in pesantren. Saarbrücken: LAP Lambert Academic Publishing.
