= N-Peace Awards =

N-Peace Network
- Awarded for: Outstanding contributions in peace
- Location: United Nations, United States
- Presented by: N-Peace Network on behalf of the United Nations
- First award: 2011
- Website: N-Peace Awards

N-Peace, or ‘Engage for Equality, Access, Community and Empowerment’ is a UNDP flagship initiative founded in 2010 to commemorate a decade of UNSCR 1325 implementation via the Women, Peace and Security (WPS) agenda.

Currently unique to the Asia-Pacific region, N-Peace operates in Afghanistan, Pakistan, Myanmar, Sri Lanka, Indonesia, the Philippines, and Nepal with the goal of increasing the role of women in conflict resolution and peace-building. N-Peace is built on the premise that if targeted men, women, and civil society organisations are supported with increased investments in capacity, skills, and resources, they will be able to create institutional and social shifts that prioritise the inclusion and empowerment of women and girls, and ultimately change the discourse on the roles of women in peace-building.

Many interventions aimed at facilitating WPS have approached women's inclusion through top-down tactics: influencing policy and lawmakers, empowering women to realize their economic potential, and introducing quotas for women's participation in peace agreements and political institutions.

N-Peace ultimately serves four primary goals: first, to conduct dialogues among communities, governments and other groups related to WPS; second, to build the capacity of women peace activists working on the ground; third, to expand and strengthen the network of peace-building activists to best implement UNSCR 1325; and finally, to support women's participation in peace and security through sharing their stories.

== List of award winners ==
Winner	Year	Achievements	Title of Award	Country of citizenship
Rubina Feroze Bhatti	2011	Founder of Taangh Wasaib, Rubina is devoting her life to creating a more peaceful Pakistan. She protects the rights of religious minorities and women who are targets of gender-based violence.	Untold Stories	Pakistan
Electronita Duan	2011	Founder of Politenik Perdamaian Halamahera, an institute for those whose education was interrupted by armed conflict, she was awarded for her commitment to peacebuilding and the pursuit of peace through education and creative means.	Role Models for Peace	Indonesia
Shreen Abdul Saroor	2011	Founder of both the Mannar Women's Development Federation and the Women's Action Network for the empowerment and promotion of women's rights, she was awarded for her efforts in campaigning for peace and creating stability between the different ethnic groups in Sri Lanka.	Role Models for Peace	Sri Lanka
Filomena Barros Dos Reis	2011	Human rights and justice activist, she was awarded for her commitment to campaigning for political change on behalf of Timorese women.	Role Models for Peace	Timor-Leste
Purna Shova Chitrakar	2011	Founder of the "Ban Landmines Campaign Nepal", she was awarded for her effort in empowering landmines victims and providing them with access to the opportunities they need to fulfil their goals.	Role Models for Peace	Nepal
Amina Azimi	2012	Founder of Empowering Women with Disability and Landmine survivors, Amina was awarded for her advocacy for the protection and the promotion of the rights of women and girls with disabilities.	Emerging Peace Champions	Afghanistan
Sadhu Ram Sapkota	2012	Former Joint Secretary at the Ministry of Peace and Reconstruction of Nepal, he was awarded for his efforts in applying the UN Security Resolutions 1325 and 1820 on recognizing and empowering women's rights and experiences, making Nepal the first country in South Asia to nationalize and operationalize these provisions.	Men who advocate for equality	Nepal
Sister Lourdes (Mana Lou)	2012	Founder of ISMAIK, a solidarity network across Timor-Leste dealing with urgent humanitarian assistance and poverty, she was awarded for her dedication in promoting and defending human rights in Timor-Leste.	Role Models for Peace	Timor-Leste
Teresita Quintos Deles	2012	Social activist, civil servant and former Presidential Advisor to the Peace Process in the Philippines, she was awarded for her efforts in implementing UNSCR 1325 on Women, Peace, and Security at national level in the Philippines.	Role Models for Peace	Philippines
Radha Paudel	2012	Author and activist, she was awarded for her commitment to advocating for equal citizenship, the stop of child marriage and the empowerment of Mahesh women in Nepal.	Role Models for Peace	Nepal
Rupika De Silva	2012	Founder of Saviya, an NGO focused on supporting the rights of women and children in local communities, she was awarded for promoting a peace based approach of development for southern provinces and other conflict-affected areas of Sri Lanka and empowerment of women's entrepreneurship skills.	Role Models for Peace	Sri Lanka
Suraiya Kamaruzzaman	2012	Founder of Flower Aceh and advocate for the rights of Acehnese women, Suraiya was awarded for work to empower women by ensuring their safety and advising them on issues of economic and reproductive rights.	Role Models for Peace	Indonesia
Quhramaana Kakar	2012	Gender Advisor for the Afghanistan Peace and Reconciliation Program, she has been instrumental in developing gender-responsive policies and organising women's groups to function as a pressure group to the government. Quhramaana was awarded for her commitment to engaging women and youth in the most insecure parts of the country towards creating peace and rebuilding Afghanistan	Role Models for Peace	Afghanistan
Farkhunda Zahra Naderi	2012	Former Afghan Parliamentarian and Senior Advisor to the President on UN Affairs, she was awarded for her commitment to representing women's voice in institutional settings and fighting for their political participation.	Role Models for Peace	Afghanistan
Rohaniza Usman	2013	Former Philippine Country Director and Coordinator for the Asia America Initiative, Rohaniza was awarded for promoting peace and development through education, inter-generational engagement and socio-economic development in Mindanao and Bangsamoro.	Emerging Peace Champions	Philippines
Suprayoga Hadi	2013	Civil servant and champion of women's rights, Suprayoga was awarded for his efforts in the inclusion of women in peace and security issues in Indonesia.	Men who Advocate for Equality	Indonesia
Masuada Karokhi	2013	Afghan member of Parliament and MP and activist, Masuada was awarded for raising awareness about the promotion and protection of women's rights in Afghanistan.	Role Models for Peace	Afghanistan
Shashi Kumary Adhikary	2013	Lawyer and advocate for gender equality, she was awarded for her commitment to campaigning for gender equity within Nepal's laws and women's access to equitable justice, promoting women's rights from education and property rights to the basic right of identity.	Role Models for Peace	Nepal
Valentina Sagala	2013	Founder of Yayasan Institut Perempuan, an NGO advocating for laws to promote the protection of women and children, monitoring policy formulation and law enforcement, providing direct services to women and children survivors of violence, Valentina was awarded for her efforts in promoting and shaping laws against gender-based violence.	Role Models for Peace	Indonesia
Irene M. Santiago	2013	Pioneering women's rights advocate and peacemaker, she is the co-founder of the Mindanao Commission on Women, an NGO composed of Moro, Christian, and indigenous women leaders. she was awarded for her commitment to advancing the significant role of women in the Women, Peace, and Security agenda.	Role Models for Peace	Philippines
Thavachsri Charles Vijayaratnam	2013	Co-founder of the Kilinochchi District Women's Development Federation, an NGO providing psychosocial support and social integration programmes for service users, Thavachsri was awarded for promoting the improvement of the lives of marginalised peoples in rural communities in Sri Lanka.	Role Models for Peace	Sri Lanka
Magdalena Bidau Soares	2013	Peace activist and former guerilla fighter, she is the founder of Feto Haluk Hadomi Timor, an NGO providing training and support for the widows of ex-combatants. She was awarded for her dedication to the ongoing struggle for peace, unity and women's rights in Timor-Leste.	Role Models for Peace	Timor Leste
Wai Wai Nu	2014	Former political prisoner, Wai Wai Nu is a peacebuilder and human rights advocate. Founder of the Women's Peace Network, a platform that promotes peace and mutual understanding between Myanmar's different ethnicities, she was awarded for her commitment to advocating marginalised women's rights.	The Peace Generation	Myanmar
Shah Zaman	2014	Chairman of the Milky Way Foundation, lecturer and human rights activist, Shah was awarded for his dedication to ensuring high quality, free education to over 200 students in Pakistan.	The Peace Generation	Pakistan
Miriam Coronel Ferrer	2014	First woman to have signed a major peace agreement as Chief Negotiator of one of the parties, activist and Political Science Professor, Miriam was awarded for her dedication in bringing more women to the peace table and implementing UNSCR 1325 at the national level in the Philippines.	Campaigning for Action	Philippines
Hajji Khalil	2014	Former jihadist commander, who then became a prosecutor, district governor, and the head of the Badghis Provincial Peace Council in Afghanistan, Hajji was awarded for his contribution to conflict management, reconciliation, and inclusive peace in Afghanistan.	Campaigning for Action	Afghanistan
Rabiah Jamil Beg	2014	Leading television journalist and champion of gender equality, she was awarded for her commitment to cover the social issues that hamper the progress of women in conservative societies, and she has been instrumental in bringing to the debate women's perspective.	Breaking Stereotypes	Pakistan
Democracy and Peace Women Network	2014	Yangon-based local civil society organisation that strives to connect with individuals and communities whose rights and freedoms have been marginalised. they are awarded for their committed to contributing to both democracy and peace for an inclusive Myanmar.	Thinking Outside the Box	Myanmar
Mona Parkash	2014	Vice President of the Future Youth Group Hyderabad, which promotes peace and tolerance in Pakistani society, she was awarded for her efforts in promoting and providing education to marginalised Pakistani children.	Untold Stories	Pakistan
Bimala Kadayat	2014	Youth mobilizer and community role model for building sustainable peace, she was awarded for her efforts in educating her community on issues of bonded labour, violence against women, discrimination, and child marriage.	Untold Stories	Nepal
Mi Kun Chan Non	2014	Director and Vice-Chair of the Mon Women's Organisation and women's rights champion, she was awarded for advocating women's participation in the peace processes and political life in Myanmar.	Untold Stories	Myanmar
Syarifah Aliyyah Shihab	2014	Founder of the Sharifah Aliyyah Shibab Foundation, which fosters opportunities for marginalized youth discouraging them from being influenced by fundamentalist and extremist opportunities, she was recognized for contributing to the creation of an anti-terrorism mentality among youth in Indonesia.	Untold Stories	Indonesia
Hasina Jalal	2014	Advocate for women's rights, journalist and lecturer in rural Afghanistan, she was awarded for pushing the agenda of women's rights in Afghanistan through capacity building with numerous national NGOs.	Afghanistan	
Rahmatullah Noorzai	2015	Youth leader and founder of an educational institute offering free classes and training to internally displaced people, Rahmatullah was recognized for his work with internally displaced women and children in Afghanistan.	Peace Generation	Afghanistan
Kaushila Chaudhary	2015	Former bonded laborer and human rights activist, Kaushila was awarded for her work in ending discrimination and gender-based violence against ex-Kamaiyas in Nepal.	Peace Generation	Nepal
Rahmat Ullah Rahimi	2015	Founder of Modern Schools for Girls, an educational facility which has provided free education to more 600 girls in six refugee communities, he was recognized for championing women and girls' rights and efforts to end child marriages.	Peace Generation	Afghanistan
Maryam Durani	2015	Former Kandahar Provincial Council Member and advocate for women's rights, Maryam was awarded for her many initiatives championing women's inclusion in political and social life in Kandahar, Afghanistan.	Peace Generation	Afghanistan
Jo Genna Martin Jover	2015	Grassroot activist for discriminated indigenous tribes in the Philippines, she was awarded for her dedication to promoting social and cultural equality of indigenous people, specifically the Moro women, and for encouraging peacebuilding between the government and the Moro communities.	Untold Stories	Philippines
Rubina Feroze Bhatti	2015	Executive Director of Taangh Wasaib Organisation, a rights-based organisation tackling violence against women, religious intolerance, and discriminatory laws in Pakistan, Rubina was recognised for her role in fighting against gender-based violence and introduced human rights education programming in over 200 schools.	Untold Stories	Pakistan
Sharmila Thapa	2015	Founder of the Samida Women's Development Forum, an NGO empowering and supporting single mothers in Nepal, she was awarded for advocating for legislative changes against gender-based violence and providing a support system to women victims of violence.	Untold Stories	Nepal
Ja Nan Lahtaw	2015	Peace advocate and Executive Director of the Nyein Foundation, Ja Nan was recognised for her work in facilitating political dialogues between the Myanmar government and cease-fired ethnic armed organizations and advocating for their inclusion in Myanmar's political life.	Untold Stories	Myanmar
Hasina Neekzad	2015	Political and human rights activist for women and children's rights in Afghanistan, she was awarded for building a culture of peace through the positive engagement of young men and villages elders in the Herat province.	Untold Stories	Afghanistan
Aliya Harir	2016	Co-founder of Aaghaz-e-Dozi, an Indo-Pak friendship initiative which calls for change and new narratives in India-Pakistan relations and Youth Ambassador of Change for the Global Youth Peace Festival, aliya was recognised for her role in advocating for a world where young people are empowered, regardless of their background, ethnicity, or gender.	Peace Generation	Pakistan
Rizky Ashar Murdiono	2016	Youth leader and co-founder of the 2030 Youth Force Indonesia initiative, Rizky was awarded for his role in empowering and engaging young people in the implementation of SDGs and the promotion of peace and rights awareness, LGBT rights, and disability acceptance.	Peace Generation	Indonesia
Mossarat Qadeem	2016	Peace activist and founder of PAIMAN Trust, an NGO raising awareness and educating communities on the effects of violent extremism, TOLANAS, and the Women's Alliance for Security Leadership, Mossarat was recognised for her role in educating women to develop critical negotiation skills to aid wider peace-building.	Campaigning for Action	Pakistan
Mariam Barandia	2016	Executive Director of Kapamagogopa Inc., an NGO which provides skills training for young Muslims and former women combatants to expand their economic opportunities and exercise their role in building peace, she was awarded for her efforts in dispelling negative perceptions and prejudices between communities in the Philippines.	Untold Stories	Philippines
Rizwana Shah	2016	Women's rights advocate, Rizwana was awarded for her role in empowering women to gain financial independence in conservative and patriarchal parts of society and advocating for peace as a source of inclusion.	Untold Stories	Pakistan
Sumika Perera	2016	Social activist and founder of the Women's Resource Centre, Sumika was recognised for her role in empowering and supporting women to embrace their rights and face the subjugation entrenched in the society they live in.	Untold Stories	Sri Lanka
Habiba Sarabi	2016	First woman Governor within Afghanistan and Deputy Chair of Afghanistan's High Peace Council, Habiba was awarded for her role in bringing peace to Afghanistan and to enhance and enrich civil and political rights for women and girls following the Taliban rule.	Untold Stories	Afghanistan
Basanti Chaudary	2016	Former bonded-laborer and Chair of the Kamaiya Pratha Unmulan Samaj (KAPUS), she was recognised for her role in helping violence-affected women to improve their economic and social circumstances, raising awareness of their rights, and providing them with the tools for empowerment.	Untold Stories	Nepal
Dwi Rubiyanti Kholifah	2016	Campaigner for improved rights of minority groups and marginalized women, she was awarded for her role in spreading peace education throughout Indonesia and work in developing leadership skills for women.	Untold Stories	Indonesia
Farhat Asif	2017	Founder of the Institute of Peace and Diplomatic Studies, she was awarded for facilitating cooperation between government officials, civil societies, think-tanks, and educational institutions to raise the subject of women's inclusion in peace negotiations in Pakistan.	Campaigning for Peace	Pakistan
Gunawan	2017	Co-founder of the Sikola Mombine programme, an independent educational institution for women in central Sulawesi that provides training and leadership skills, he was recognised for his role in empowering women in Poso to take more prominent roles in both village decision-making and the correlating peace-building process.	Campaigning for Peace	Indonesia
Sharif Shah Safi	2017	University lecturer and Debate Program Director of the Afghanistan Youths Civic Engagement and Educational Organization, Sharif was recognised for his role in preventing extremism, violence, and inequalities by promoting education and respectful conversations among youths.	Peace Generation	Afghanistan
Suraya Yosufi	2017	Founder of the Afghan Girls Debating Project, a project for high school and university students offering specialised training in critical thinking, rational reasoning, research skills, time management, and teamwork, Suraya was awarded for empowering young girls and providing a platform for Afghan women to speak their minds freely.	Peace Generation	Afghanistan
Hadja Giobay Diocolano	2017	Founder of the Kadtabanga Foundation for Peace and Development Advocates, which helps conflict-affected and conflict-vulnerable communities in central Mindanao become Peace and Development Communities, she was awarded for promoting a culture of peace among communities affected by conflict, especially targeting youth and women.	Untold Stories	Philippines
Bernadine Anderson	2017	Founder of Bridge2Peace (B2P) and La Petite Fleur School in Sri Lanka, she was recognised for her work in supporting rehabilitation efforts by engaging with young former Tamil Tigers, achieving peace through education.	Untold Stories	Sri Lanka
Farhat Sajaad	2017	Co-founder of the Shining Light Community Development Organisation, a social welfare organisation that equips communities with innovative education, training, and development programmes, she was awarded for encourages Muslim-Christian dialogue through providing training for both communities in economic empowerment activities.	Untold Stories	Pakistan
Rahmatan	2017	Humanitarian aid worker, counselor, and campaigner for women's judicial rights in Aceh, Rahmatan was awarded for her work in empowering Acehnese women and providing them with the support to emerge as leaders from the grassroots level.	Untold Stories	Indonesia
Srijana Karki	2017	Leading social activist calling for the end of gender-based violence, Srijana was awarded for her role in ensuring that the voices of those belonging to marginalised groups or communities are adequately represented and heard at the government level.	Untold Stories	Nepal
Cheery Zahau	2017	Co-founder of the Women's League of Chinland and member of the Chin Progressive Party, she was awarded for her efforts in empowering Chin women refugees with leadership training, education programmes, and health and nursing programmes.	Untold Stories	Myanmar
Sayeeda Muradi	2017	Women's rights activist, Sayeeda was recognised for her role in managing inclusive'peace shuras' and supporting conflict resolutions for women's issues at community and district level.	Untold Stories	Afghanistan
Muqadasa Ahmadzai	2018	Peace and women's rights activist, she was awarded for her grassroots community efforts against conflict and supporting survivors of domestic violence.	Peace Generation	Afghanistan
Mary Akrami	2018	Activist, founder of the Afghan Women Skills Development Center and member of Afghanistan High Peace Council, she was awarded for having established peace "shuras" for women seeking conflict resolution.	Campaigning for Action	Afghanistan
Hira Singh Thapa	2018	Social activist and champion of women's rights, he was awarded for his continuous efforts in encouraging men to help end the practice of "chauupadi", child marriage, domestic violence, and menstruation taboos in Nepal.	Campaigning for Action	Nepal
Samira Gutoc-Tomawis	2018	Social activist and government official, she was awarded for her commitment to advocating the rights of women and marginalised groups in post-conflict Philippines.	Untold Stories	Philippines
Mira Kusumarini	2018	Preventing violent extremism expert and founder of C-Save (the Civil Society Action Against Violent Extremism), she was awarded for her work in rehabilitating and reintegrating ISIS-affiliated children and women deportees back safely into society.	Untold Stories	Indonesia
Logshari Kunwar	2018	Journalist and activist, she was awarded for her work in investigating gender-based violence and human rights violations in Nepal.	Untold Stories	Nepal
Visaka Dharmadasa	2018	Peace activist and founder of the Association of War Affected Women, she was awarded for encouraging important dialogues between women of different ethnicities in Sri Lanka, advocating for the empowerment and inclusion of women in peacebuilding process.	Untold Stories	Sri Lanka
Cynthia Maung	2018	Social activist and medical doctor, founder of the Mae Tao Clinic, she was awarded for her efforts in providing emergency maternal healthcare in conflict areas to refugee women at the Thai-Myanmar border.	Untold Stories	Myanmar
Mahira Miyanji	2018	Social activist and founder of Woman is Nation Welfare Organisation, she was awarded for her commitment to women's empowerment and girls' education in Lyari, Karachi.	Untold Stories	Pakistan
Khojasta Sameyee	2018	Afghan journalist, she was awarded for her work in using radio to inform remote communities of women's rights, politics, and peacebuilding.	Untold Stories	Afghanistan
Maisam Iltaf-Kazemi	2019		Peace Generation	Afghanistan
Sohaila Rezaee	2019		Peace Generation	Afghanistan
Ram Bahadur Sunar	2019		Campaigning for Action	Nepal
Amina Rasul-Bernardo	2019		Campaigning for Action	Philippines
Froilyn Tenorio Mendoza	2019		Untold Stories	Philippines
Meena Baber	2019		Untold Stories	Pakistan
Sarita Saru B.K.	2019		Untold Stories	Nepal
May Sabe Phyu	2019		Untold Stories	Myanmar
Dewi Rana Amir	2019		Untold Stories	Indonesia
Dayani Panagoda	2019		Untold Stories	Sri Lanka
Zarqa Yaftali	2019		Untold Stories	Afghanistan
