= Athens Democracy Forum =

International conference

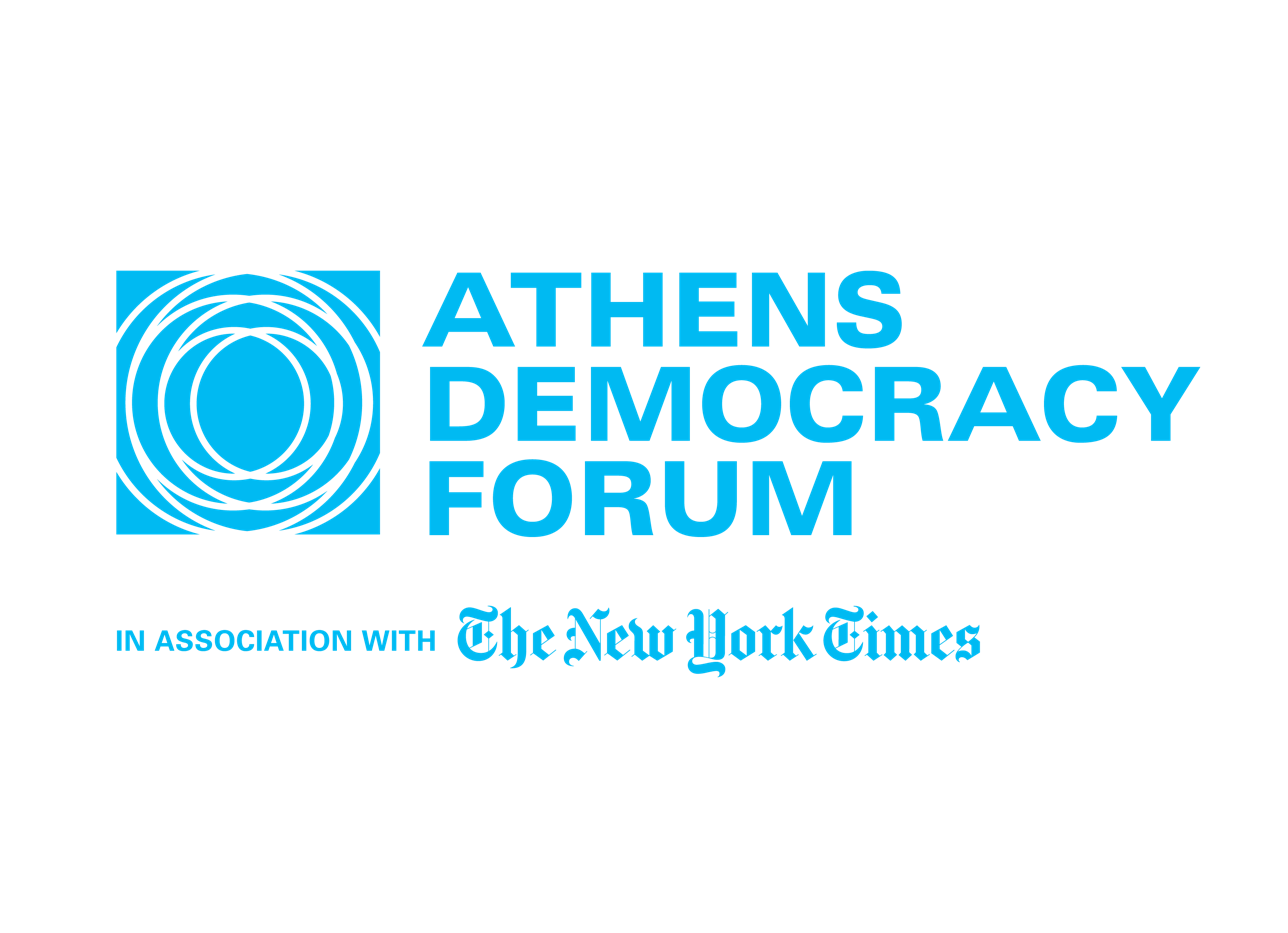
- Abbreviation: ADF
- Formation: 2012
- Headquarters: London, England
- Location(s): Athens, Greece
- Website: athensdemocracyforum.com

Held annually around the United Nations International Day of Democracy, the Athens Democracy Forum was founded in 2012. The mission of the Forum is to bring together diverse voices and perspectives that help democracies evolve and become more resilient in the face of rising inequalities, the rapidly developing climate crisis, adverse democratic shifts, runaway tech innovation and failing multilateral governance.

Key events include the Aristotle Address, the City of Athens Democracy Award, the Kofi Annan NextGen Democracy Prize and the Democratic Innovators of the 21st Century Politicians' Hall of Fame.

== The Democracy & Culture Foundation ==
The Democracy & Culture Foundation was founded in 2019. The Foundation's mission is to help democracy evolve by empowering society through citizen engagement and better governance. It aims to become the leading global platform for dialogue and solution-oriented activities concerning the evolution of democracy and culture. Two of its major events, the Athens Democracy Forum in association with The New York Times and Art for Tomorrow, are held annually and designed to convene, connect and foster collaboration between prominent and emerging voices for both democracy and culture. The Foundation and its partners also run worldwide initiatives including Teens for Democracy, Reimagining the Building Blocks of Democracy, the Climate Change Hub, the Kofi Annan NextGen Democracy Prize, as well as exploring the use of A.I. in deliberative democracy tools.

== History ==
From 2013 to 2018, the Athens Democracy Forum was convened by The New York Times. Since 2019, the event has been organized by the nonprofit Democracy & Culture Foundation. The first Athens Democracy Forum was held around the United Nations International Day of Democracy with the U.N. secretary-general's endorsement, and the Forum continues to partner with the United Nations.

== Conferences ==
=== 2025 Conference ===
The 13th edition took place from September 30 – October 3 at the Athens Conservatoire and gathered more than 460 participants. It was themed ‘’New Visions for Hard Realities’’ and explored how global upheaval, technological change and citizens’ hunger for renewal are reshaping democracy worldwide.

Two new modules were introduced; the N.G.O. Showcase on Civic Education, Information Ecosystems and Deliberative Democratic Processes - giving the stage to nine nonprofit organizations, and the A.I., Ethics & Democracy Sessions - exploring the impact and challenges artificial intelligence has had on democracy.

Prominent speakers included co-founder and C.E.O. of Rappler Maria Ressa, Former President of Slovenia and President of Club de Madrid Danilo Türk, Former Minister of Transport and Internal Trade and Former Deputy Prime Minister Chrystia Freeland, and chairman at the Center for Liberal Strategies in Sofia Ivan Krastev.

=== 2024 Conference ===
The 12th edition took place in Athens from October 1–3, 2024, under the theme “Α Moment of Truth” and gathered over 400 attendees from all continents. Against the backdrop of misinformation, declining trust and global elections, the Forum explored how truth and trust can be restored in democratic societies. It featured sessions on regional case studies, rethinking key issues and innovative democratic tools, and included the presentation of the Kofi Annan NextGen Democracy Prize and the Democratic Innovators of the 21st Century Politicians’ Hall of Fame. Prominent speakers included H.E. The President of the Hellenic Republic Katerina Sakellaropoulou, Mayor of Athens Harris Doukas, Founder of “Exponential View” Azeem Azhar and Chief Economist of the European Bank for Reconstruction and Development Beata Javorcik, among others.

=== 2023 Conference ===
The 11th edition took place from September 26–29, under the theme “Do We Dare to Hope?” and was opened by H.E. the President of Greece, Katerina Sakellaropoulou. Amid rising authoritarianism, widening inequality and global conflict, the Forum examined the future of democratic rule and fundamental freedoms, highlighting both the challenges to liberal democracy and its enduring resilience and gathered over 450 attendees from all continents. Prominent speakers included European Commissioner for International Partnerships Jutta Urpilainen, Portugal's Former Secretary of State for European Affairs Bruno Maçães, Meta's President Global Affairs Nick Clegg, Filmmaker Amos Gitai, and UNESCO's former Director General Irina Bokova. The New York Times produced a special report, 'Daring to Hope That Democracy Will Prevail' highlighting the main outputs and discussions.

=== 2022 Conference ===
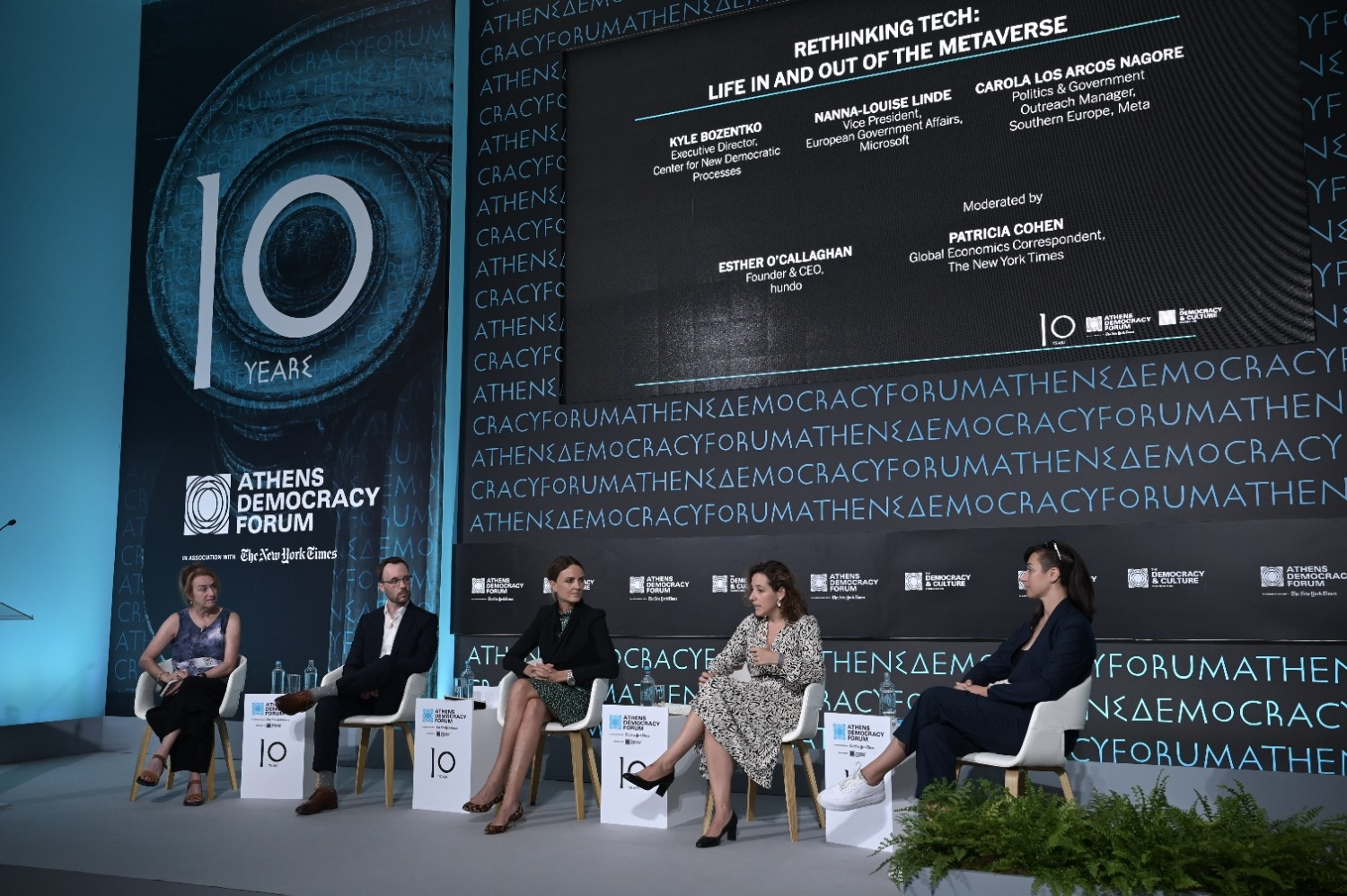
A panel discussion about how emerging technologies and the metaverse are reshaping the boundaries between virtual and real life, with mixed consequences for society.

The 10th edition took place from September 28–30 at the Zappeion Megaron, Stoa of Attalos and the Academy of Athens. 250 international guests attended the event from over 30 countries. This edition focused on the challenges facing liberal democracy amid political polarization, authoritarian resurgence and global crises, while exploring innovative approaches and practices aimed at renewing democratic systems. European Commission President Ursula von der Leyen delivered the Aristotle keynote address and among the many prominent speakers were the 8th United Nations Secretary General Ban Ki-moon, American Economist Jeffrey Sachs, Vice President for Values and Transparency, European Commission Vera Jourova, Writer and Academic Yascha Mounk and Founder and chair, Mo Ibrahim Foundation, Mo Ibrahim.

=== 2021 Conference ===
The 9th edition took place September 29–October 1. This edition examined the lessons drawn from overlapping global crises, including the pandemic and the rise of populism, and explored how democracy can be strengthened and adapted to address economic, social, technological and environmental challenges through citizen engagement and improved governance. Prominent speakers included President of the Hellenic Republic Katerina Sakellaropoulou, Prime Minister of the Hellenic Republic Kyriakos Mitsotakis, American Politician and Voting Rights Advocate Stacey Abrams, Leader of Democratic Belarus Sviatlana Tsikhanouskaya, Hungarian Foreign Minister Péter Szijjártó and Princeton University Professor Emeritus Kwame Anthony Appiah.

=== 2020 Conference ===
The 8th edition took place September 30–October 2. This edition focused on the contemporary challenges democracy is facing worldwide and the need to rethink democratic governance, with an emphasis on improving governance and strengthening citizen engagement. Prominent speakers included Prime Minister of the Hellenic Republic Kyriakos Mitsotakis, American Economist Jeffrey Sachs, Former President of the UN Security Council Kishore Mahbubani, C.E.O. of the New York Times Company Mark Thompson and Former U.S. Ambassador to Ukraine Marie (Masha) Yovanovitch.

=== 2019 Conference ===
The 7th edition took place October 9–11. This edition focused on assessing the state of democracy amid rising authoritarianism and populism, bringing together international leaders and experts to explore new solutions in response to rapid global change. Prominent speakers included Poet & Nobel Literature Laureate Wole Soyinka, European Commissioner for Competition Margrethe Vestager, Vice President of Facebook and Former Deputy PM of UK - US Sir Nick Clegg, Chairperson of Qatar Foundation for Education, Science and Community Development HH Sheikha Moza and Chairman of the International Crisis Group Lord Mark Malloch-Brown.

== Building Blocks for Democracy ==
Following the 2021 Athens Democracy Forum, the Democracy & Culture Foundation initiated a four-year project called “Re-imagining the Building Blocks for Democracy”. The project was launched in response to the calls during the 2021 Forum to establish more specific characteristics that make democracy resilient to 21st century issues. The Democracy & Culture Foundation initially cooperated with five partner organizations, each of which was responsible for a particular “building block”: Konrad Adenauer Foundation in Berlin, Germany (“The power of Parties, Money and Influence”); Taejae Academy in association with Ban Ki-moon Foundation in Seoul, South Korea (“The power of the Executive”); newDemocracy Foundation in Sydney, Australia (“The power of People’); The Bertelsmann Foundation in Washington DC, United States (“The power of Information”); IDEA in association with Sapienship in Tel Aviv, Israel (“The Power of Voting”). It was agreed that the initial five partners will draft policy proposals in local experts’ panels in 2022 (stage 1), subject those proposals to the scrutiny of citizen's panels in 2023 (stage 2) and campaign for the implementation of those proposals in 2024 (stage 3). In 2023, the Democracy & Culture Foundation partnered with McKinsey and a variety of academics and EU institutions to create two additional building blocks: “The power of Business” and “The power of AI and Ethics,” as well as Foundation for Innovation and Development in Colombia, which took over “The power of Information” building block.

== City of Athens Democracy Award ==
Established in 2016 by the Mayor of Athens, the City of Athens Democracy Award is presented annually at the Athens Democracy Forum to individuals with international recognition, whose work and ethics defend democratic principles.

=== Recipients ===
- 2016 – Kenneth Roth, executive director of Human Rights Watch
- 2017 – H.E. Felipe González Márquez, Former Prime Minister of Spain
- 2018 – H.E. Joaquim Alberto Chissano, Former President of Mozambique
- 2019 – Pawel Adamowicz, Former Mayor of the City of Gdańsk
- 2020 – Fernando Henrique Cardoso, Former President of Brazil
- 2021 – Wai Wai Nu, a Burmese activist
- 2022 – Volodymyr Zelenskyy, People of Ukraine and President
- 2023 – Jean-Claude Juncker, Former Prime Minister of Luxembourg and President of the European Commission
- 2024 – Katerina N. Sakellaropoulou, H.E. The President of the Hellenic Republic
- 2025 – Gideon Levy, Journalist and Author

== Kofi Annan NextGen Democracy Prize ==
The Democracy & Culture Foundation, in partnership with the Kofi Annan Foundation, awards the Kofi Annan NextGen Democracy Prize at the Athens Democracy Forum. The prize is awarded to a youth activist between 18 and 30 years old, who exemplifies exceptional leadership to inspire more young people to commit to the advancement of democracy. The award was established in 2023. The Athens Democracy Forum first partnered with the Kofi Annan Foundation in 2017, after Mr. Kofi Annan attended the forum.

=== Recipients ===
- 2023 – Namatai Kwekweza, Founder and Director, WELEAD Trust
- 2024 – Omar van Reenen, co-founder and Campaign Manager, Equal Namibia
- 2025 – Julián Rodriguez Sastoque, Economist and Councilor, Bogotá City Council

== Distinguished speakers ==
- Kofi Annan [2017]
- Kevin Rudd [2017]
- Ai WeiWei [2018]
- Michael D. Higgins [2019]
- Donald Tusk [2019]
- Kyriakos Mitsotakis [2020]
- Yuval Noah Harari [2020]
- Stacey Abrams [2021]
- Joseph E. Stiglitz [2021]
- Ursula Von der Leyen [2022]
- Jefferey Sachs [2024]
- Maria Ressa [2025]

== Advisory board ==
- Serge Schmemann – Member of the editorial board, The New York Times
- Jane Bornemeier – Editor, Special Sections, The New York Times
- Kim Conniff Taber – Editorial Director, Democracy and Culture Foundation
- Kishore Mahbubani – Former President, U.N. Security Council, and Professor in the Practice of Public Policy, National University of Singapore
- Corinne Momal-Vanian – Executive Director, Kofi Annan Foundation
- Alexis Papahelas – Executive Editor, Kathimerini
- Alexandra Pascalidou – Journalist, Author, TV & Radio host, speaker, moderator
- Alexander Rhodes – Managing Associate, Mishcon de Reya
- Adama Sanneh, co-founder and C.E.O., Moleskine Foundation
- Jayathma Wickramanayake – United Nations Secretary General's Envoy on Youth, United Nations
