= Sabitri Bogati (Pathak) =

Nepali politician

Member of Parliament, Pratinidhi Sabha
- In office 28 April 2006 – 16 January 2008
- Preceded by: Himself (2002)
- Succeeded by: Lalmani Chaudhary (as Member of the Constituent Assembly)
- Constituency: Chitwan 1
- In office 23 June 1999 – 22 May 2002
- Preceded by: Jagrit Prasad Bhetwal
- Succeeded by: Himself (2002)
- Constituency: Chitwan 1

Personal details
- Party: Nepali Congress

Sabitri Bogati (Pathak) (Nepali: साबित्री बोगटी पाठक) is a Nepalese politician, elected to the Pratinidhi Sabha in the 1999 election on behalf of the Nepali Congress.
