= Purna Shova Chitrakar =

Nepalese peace activist

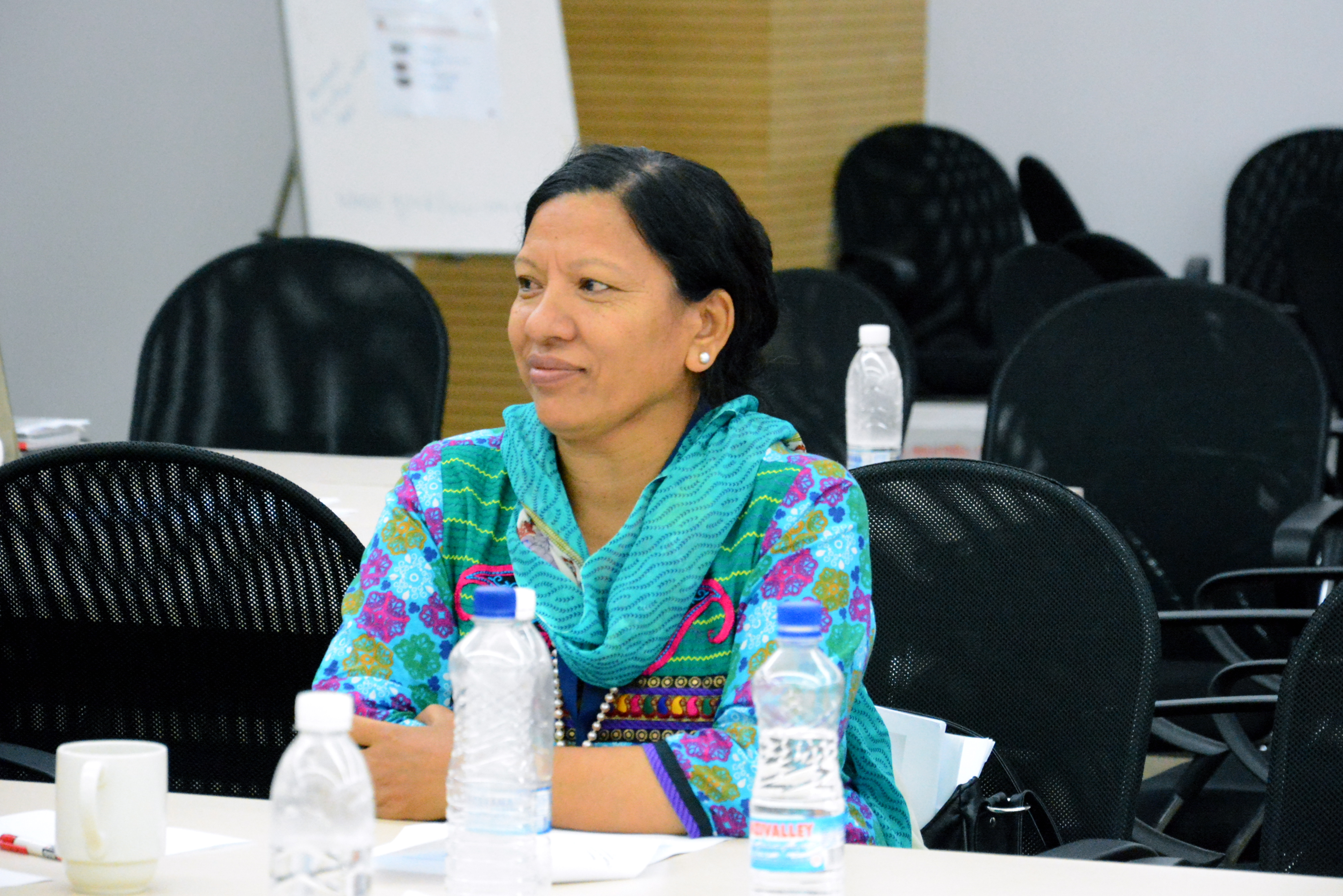
- Chitrakar at the 4MSP mobilisation workshop, 2013
- Occupations: Activist, Writer
- Known for: N-Peace Award recipient
- Spouse: Surendra Pandey

Purna Shova Chitrakar is an activist, columnist, writer, Nepalese founder of Ban Landmines Campaign Nepal (NCBL), and recipient of the N-Peace Award in 2011. She is currently the Director of NCBL.

In 1995 Chitrakar founded Ban Landmines Campaign Nepal (NCBL) to ban on the use, production, transfer and stockpile of landmines. She is the author of the paper Mine-risk Education in Nepal, 2009 and Aadha Akash. She has published articles on mine action, politics, and social discourse, in various journals and newspapers. In 2011, Chitrakar was one of the inaugural recipients of the N-Peace Award. That same year, Nepal was declared landmine free.
