= Masuada Karokhi =

Afghan peace and women's rights activist

- مسعوده کروخی
- Born: 1962 (age 63–64); Herat Province, Afghanistan
- Other name: Mrs. Karukhi Masuda
- Citizenship: Afghanistan
- Occupations: Politician, activist, educator
- Known for: N-Peace Award recipient

Masuada Karokhi (Dari: مسعوده کروخی) is an Afghan peace activist, women's rights advocate, and recipient of the N-Peace Award in 2013.

== Career ==
Karokhi was also a member of Parliament. She twice ran to be a member of the Lower House for Herat, in 2005 and 2010, She won in 2010.

As women's rights activist she was receiving frequent threats but she didn't give up on fighting and advocating for women rights especially in Afghanistan. When education for Women and Girls was banned in Afghanistan she secretly started free classes for poor Women and Girls.
