= Rubina Feroze Bhatti =

Pakistani activist (born 1969)

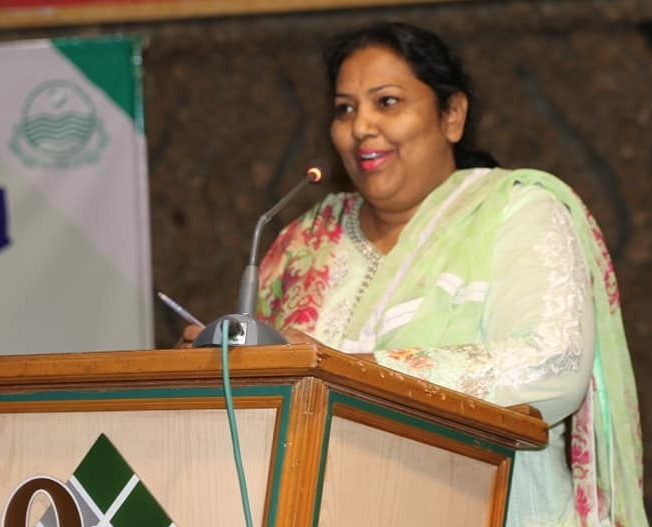
- Dr. Rubina Feroze Bhatti addressing a seminar on marriage laws.
- Born: 1969 (age 56–57); Sargodha, Pakistan
- Education: PhD, University of San Diego (USA); Masters, Maynooth University (Ireland); Masters, Bahauddin Zakariya University (Pakistan)
- Occupations: International Development & Strategic Leadership Consultant; Human Rights & Public Policy Expert; Assistant Professor; Ex-Member NCRC
- Relatives: Nabila Feroz Bhatti
- Website: https://rubinaferozebhatti.com/

Rubina Feroze Bhatti (Urdu: رو بینہ فیروز بھٹی; born 1969) is an international development and strategic leadership consultant, and human rights and public policy expert. She is a former member of the country's National Commission on the Rights of Child, where she represented Punjab province. She is currently serving as an assistant professor at Pakistan Global Institute and a visiting fellow at Stanford University.

== Early life and education ==
Rubina Bhatti, one of four children, was born and raised in Sargodha, Pakistan, where she completed her Matric and Intermediate. She did her Bachelor of Science in 1990 from the University of the Punjab, and earned her master's degree in Chemistry from Bahauddin Zakariya University in 1993. Later, she did a Master's in Development Studies at Maynooth University, Ireland, in 2008 where she was honored with the Student of the Year Award. Finally, she earned a PhD in Leadership Studies at the University of San Diego in 2015.

== Career ==
Bhatti started a job as a lecturer of Chemistry at Government College for Women, Sargodha where she taught from February 1996 to December 2004. In 1998, she and a team of her students formed an informal group called Taangh Wasaib (Urdu words' meaning “longing for the fullness of humanity"). After teaching in a public education sector and completing Masters in Development Studies, she entered the social development sector, and formally joined Taangh Wasaib Organization which works for the promotion of communal harmony, gender equality, and respect for human rights. She served there in different capacities including General Secretary and as the executive director until March 2020. She used Sufism as a tool for building peace among diverse communities in Pakistan, and promoted the Sufis' message based on the ideals of brotherhood and harmony. She developed a Peace Garden, a place that served for both reflection and celebration, of stillness and revelry, poetry and music. She has been involved in providing her services to train community leaders, activists, and journalists on leadership development, peace-building, and human rights advocacy. She has served as a member of the governing body at the Centre for Social Justice and Peoples Commission for Minorities Rights.

Bhatti has served as a Visiting scholar at Eastern Mennonite University in 2011, and as Project Lead, Women's Leadership Dialogue for Change at the University of San Diego, 2013–2014. She has given talks and lectures at national and international forums on empowerment of women, violence against women, women in peacebuilding, women in leadership, and human rights. She served as a member of the Advisory Council for Minorities Affairs to the Chief Minister of Punjab during 2015 and 2018.

Bhatti was selected to serve as the Member Punjab at the National Commission for Rights of Child, a statutory body established in April 2020 by the Government of Pakistan under NCRC Act, 2017 and is mandated to examine and review existing and proposed laws, policies, practice and proposals in the best interest of the children, and carry out an inquiry in cases involving a violation of child rights. As a member of NCRC, she is engaged in policy dialogue and monitoring the situation to legally protect and effectively implement child rights in conformity with national and international instruments on the promotion and protection of children's rights.

== Publications ==
- What is Leadership
- The Vision of Peace
- Productive volunteerism
- Women's Rights
- Human Rights Education

=== Articles ===
- Going Down in Higher Education
- Revisiting the Concept of Minority
- Pakistan's Beaten Youth
- For women leaders, the world is still far from equal
- Beyond tokenism: can minority wings make a difference?
- The ageless quest for higher education
- Striving for inclusivity
- Bhatti, Rubina Feroze (2021-12-11). "Child Rights In Pakistan: Reframing Policy And Practice". Naya Daur. Retrieved 2021-09-01
- Bhatti, Rubina Feroze (2020-07-14). "Child Sexual Abuse: Build Protective Mechanisms To Save Our Children". Naya Daur.
- Bhatti, Rubina Feroze (2020-06-29). "The Lethal Nexus Of Poverty & Pandemic Could Increase Child Rights Violations". Naya Daur.
- "Poverty, Education and Child Labour". Hum Sub (in Urdu). 18 August 2020.
- "Children and Society". Hum Sub (in Urdu). 2 October 2020.
- "Cecil Chaudhary Roundabout". HumSub (in Urdu). 2016-12-10.
- "11 August: National Minorities Day". Hum Sub (in Urdu). 16 August 2016.

== Awards and recognition ==
- Woman of Courage Award 2011, from the National Women's Political Caucus
- 2015 N-Peace Awards by the United Nations Development Program (UNDP)
- Woman PeaceMaker at the Joan B. Kroc Institute for Peace & Justice in 2009.
- World Vision International Peacemaking Award in 2010
- Human Rights Awards by Ministry for Human Rights & Minorities Affairs, Government of Punjab during the PML-N and PTI governments
- Minority Excellence Award 2025, presented by the Honorable Prime Minister of Pakistan, Mr. Muhammad Shehbaz Sharif, in recognition of her outstanding contributions to the country’s development.
- Congressional recognition for her efforts in strengthening Pakistan-United States relations and promoting economic diplomacy and inclusive development. Among the 1,000 Women nominated for the Nobel Peace Prize 2005.
- Nominated among the 100 women who matter most in Pakistan
- Named among the female achievers of the year 2015 on The News International list of 2015's Movers and Shakers in Pakistan.
- One of the world's 200 Women in Development chosen by European Union in 2016
- International Visitor Leadership Program (IVLP) to study the culture of community service and volunteerism in the USA. She was honored as a Member of the Month at the International Exchange Alumni website in June 2015.
