= Amina Azimi =

Afghan activist

- Occupation: Activist
- Known for: N-Peace Award recipient

Amina Azimi is an advocate for disabled women's rights in Afghanistan. In 2012 she won the N-Peace Award.

== Biography ==
Born in Afghanistan in the 1980s, Azimi lost her right leg at age 11 as a result of her home being hit by a rocket-propelled grenade during the Afghan Civil War. Her injury put her in the large group of disabled Afghans in a country that has one of the highest percentages, by population, of disabled people in the world. As a disabled person, Azimi encountered problems returning to school and subsequently faced discrimination when she sought employment. Azimi became an advocate for the rights of disabled women from Afghanistan.

In 2007 she founded the Women with Disabilities Advocacy Committee (WAAC). She created the Empowering Women with Disabilities organization (EWD) in 2011. In 2012 Azimi was awarded the N-Peace Award as an Emerging Peace Champion.

Azimi advocated for elimination of discrimination against landmine survivors as a presenter and journalist for a radio program called Qahir-e-Qahraman. The program was first supported by UNDP’s National Programme for Action on Disability, then the UN Mine Action Center for Afghanistan and Internews. She works for Afghan Landmine Survivors' Organisation (ALSO).
