= Rauf Klasra =

Pakistani journalist and columnist

Rauf Klasra (Urdu: رؤف کلاسرا) is a Pakistani journalist and Urdu language columnist. He files stories for both the newspaper and television. Moreover he is also running a web paper and was earlier working with The News. Klasra is known for investigating political scams and scandals and has unfolded many financial and moral scams of political elite.

== Early life and education ==
Rauf Klasra belongs to Layyah District of Punjab, Pakistan. He hails from a Jatt sub-tribe known as Klasra, which is primarily found in central and southern Punjab. He later pursued higher education in English Literature at Bahauddin Zakariya University in Multan and Goldsmiths, University of London.

== Journalism career ==
Klasra began his journalism career as a reporter for Daily Dawn, initially working in the field before being transferred to the newspaper's Islamabad bureau. He later joined The News and also contributed columns to Jang and Akhbar-e-Jahan. Subsequently, he served as Editor Investigations at The Express Tribune. He is currently affiliated with Dunya News as Editor Investigations.

== Anchor career ==
He has also worked as the co-anchor of a news show on 92 News called Muqabil, where he frequently gave out political scams and financial scandals. He quit the show and resigned from 92 News on 28 April 2019 and joined Public News where he hosts the show Muqabil Public Kay Sath. Klasra has won the APNS best reporter of the year award multiple times.

== Books ==
=== Original works ===
Rauf Klasra has authored several books in Urdu, both fiction and non-fiction, including:

- Aik Siyasat Kai Kahaniyan (ایک سیاست کئی کہانیاں): A collection of political narratives.
- Gumnaam Gaon Ka Akhri Mazar (گمنام گاؤں کا آخری مزار): Explores the mysteries of a forgotten village.
- Aik Qatal Jo Na Ho Saka (ایک قتل جو نہ ہو سکا): Investigates an unresolved murder case.
- Shah Jamal Ka Mujawir (شاہ جمال کا مجاور): A novel blending mystery and social commentary.
- Junagadh Ka Qazi, Deccan Ka Molvi (جوناگڑھ کا قاضی، دکن کا مولوی): Delves into historical and cultural narratives.
- Niralay Log Nirali Kahaniyan (نرالے لوگ نرالی کہانیاں): Profiles of unconventional individuals.
- Kashmir Kahani (کشمیر کہانی): Discusses the complexities of the Kashmir issue.

=== Translations ===
Klasra has also contributed to Urdu literature through translations, including:

- The Godfather by Mario Puzo
- Works by Honoré de Balzac: Including Tareek Raahon Kay Musafir (تاریک راہوں کے مسافر) and Sunehri Ankhon Wali Larki (سنہری آنکھوں والی لڑکی), introducing Balzac's narratives to Urdu readers.
