= Rohaniza Usman =

Filipina activist

- Other names: Bai Rohaniza Sumndad-Usman
- Occupation: Founder/ Chief Peace Mission Keeper
- Years active: 18
- Known for: Teach Peace Build Peace Movement, N-Peace Award recipient, Ashoka Fellow
- Spouse: Dr. Almuhaimin Usman

Rohaniza Usman is a Filipina peacemaker. In 2013 she won the N-Peace Award.

== Biography ==
Born in the Philippines, Usman grew up in Riyadh, Saudi Arabia and returned to the Philippines to attend Assumption College. She started her career working on programs for the Office of the Presidential Assistant for Youth Affairs in Manila. She then worked in the Peace Development program for the non-governmental organization (NGO), Asia America Initiative.

Usman is the founder of the NGO Teach Peace Build Peace Movement which focuses on Filipino youth involvement in the peace movement.

In 2013 Usman was awarded the N-Peace Award as an Emerging Peace Champion. She also received the 2014 Doha International Center for Interfaith Dialogue award. Usman is an Ashoka Fellow.
