= Suraiya Kamaruzzaman =

Acehnese human rights activist (born 1971)

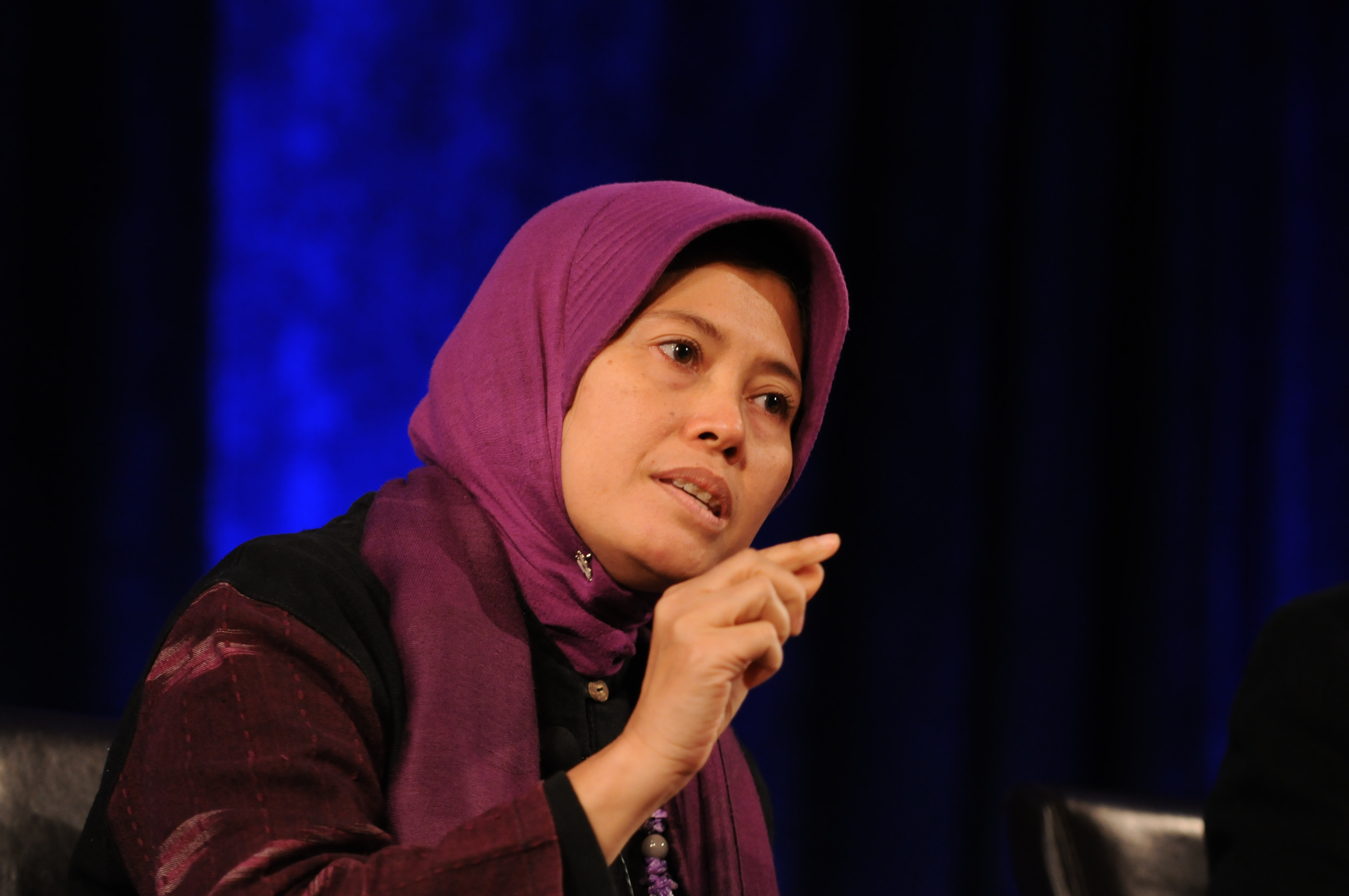
- Born: 1971 (age 54–55); Aceh, Indonesia
- Education: Syiah Kuala University
- Occupations: Women's rights activist Lecturer
- Years active: 1989–present
- Organization: Aceh Flower
- Known for: Activism during the insurgency in Aceh
- Awards: Yap Thiam Hien Award (2001); N-Peace Award (2012)

Suraiya Kamaruzzaman (born c. 1970) is an Acehnese human rights activist, known for her advocacy for women living in Aceh, an autonomous region of Indonesia, both during and after the insurgency in Aceh.

== Activism ==
Kamaruzzaman was born and raised in Aceh, studying chemical engineering at Syiah Kuala University in Banda Aceh, the province's capital.

Aceh had a long-running insurgency between the Free Aceh Movement, a separatist group seeking independence for Aceh, and the Indonesian government. The insurgency had already been going on for 13 years when Kamaruzzaman founded Flower Aceh, a non-governmental organisation that supported Acehnese women who had been the victims of violence, including sexual violence, during the conflict. Flower Aceh sought to empower women in Aceh by ensuring their safety and offering advice on economic and reproductive issues; during the conflict, Kamaruzzaman came under suspicion by both the Indonesian military and the Free Aceh Movement. Following the 2004 Indian Ocean earthquake and tsunami and the subsequent end to the insurgency, Flower Aceh sought to advocate for women as part of the rebuilding of society following the devastation of the conflict and the tsunami.

Kamaruzzaman identified 128 rape cases and 91 sexual harassment cases against Acehnese women by the Indonesian military during the conflict between 1989 and 1998, as well as an incident of mass rape against Chinese women in May 1998. While praising the government of Abdurrahman Wahid for forming a Human Rights Ministry and establishing a Commission of Inquiry into Violations to investigate human rights abuses, including in Aceh, she criticised the failure to make any charges in relation to rape and sexual assault during the insurgency, as well as a failure of the reforms to bring to an end the issues of human rights abuses, conflict and malnutrition in Aceh. In 1999, Kamaruzzaman spoke at the International Human Rights Conference in Geneva, Switzerland about the experiences of Acehenese women during wartime; she also lobbied the European Parliament about providing aid to help peacebuilders in Aceh.

Kamaruzzaman has advocated for women in Aceh since the end of the conflict and has criticised women being overlooked in the rebuilding process; she left her role as a PhD student at City University of Hong Kong to focus on the rebuilding of Banda Aceh, including fundraising for a new school and women's crisis centre. She has sought a reevaluation of the role Acehnese women played during the conflict, including running households while men fought against the army, and retrieving and burying people killed. In 2000, she founded the Acehnese Women's Congress (Acehnese: Duek Pakat Inong Aceh), which developed its own women'sw movement, Balai Syura Ureung Inong Aceh.

Kamaruzzaman led Women Volunteers for Humanity, that offered assistance to women and child refugees, and served as acting head for women and children at the Aceh Terrorism Prevention Coordonation Forum, advocating for the role of mothers in spreading peace and preventing radicalisation.

Kamaruzzaman is currently a lecturer in the engineering department of Syiah Kuala University, and the head of its USK Climate Change Research Centre.

== Recognition ==
In 2001, Kamaruzzaman received the Yap Thiam Hien Award from the Human Rights Study Centre Foundation in Jakarta in recognition of her "very solid track record in women empowerment in socio-economic life, and the defence of the rights of women who often fell victims to violence by the military or to sexual violence in conflict-torn Aceh".

In 2012, Kamaruzzaman received the N-Peace Award, sponsored by the United Nations Development Programme.
