= Magdalena Bidau Soares =

East Timorese peace and women's rights activist

- Occupation: Peace activist
- Known for: N-Peace Award recipient

Magdalena Bidau Soares is an East Timorese peace activist and recipient of the N-Peace Award in 2013.

In 1975 Soares was forced to flee her village during the Indonesian occupation of East Timor. She became part of the guerrilla movement resisting the occupation. She was captured and imprisoned. After her release she continued her resistance activities by joining the Popular Women’s Organisation Timor (OPMT). Once the occupation was over, in 1999, Soares turned her attention to peace activism and improving the lives of others. She founded the organization Feto Haluk Hadomi Timor which works with widows of ex-combatants, providing training for income-generating activities like farming and crafts.

In 2013 Soares was one of the eight recipients of the N-Peace Award. She was awarded the prize for her peace, educational and income-generating initiatives for the underprivileged East Timorese.
