= Bahauddin Zakariya University =

Pakistani public university

Coordinates: 30°15′49″N 71°30′35″E

- جامعۂ بہاءالدین زکریا
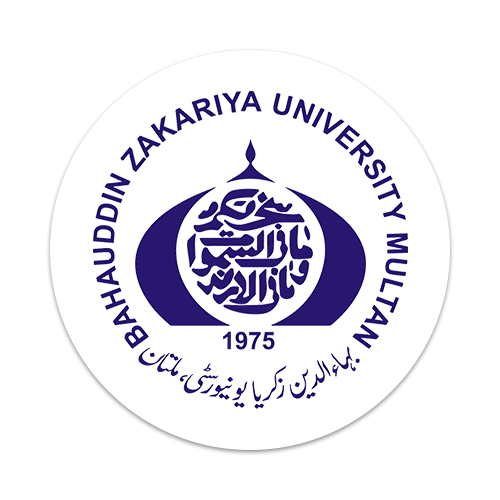
- Motto: Knowledge Is Power
- Type: Public
- Established: 1975
- Affiliations: Higher Education Commission (Pakistan)
- Chancellor: Governor of Punjab
- Vice-Chancellor: Dr. Zubair Iqbal
- Students: 40,000
- Undergraduates: 30,000
- Postgraduates: 7,000
- Doctoral students: 3,000
- Location: Multan, Punjab, Pakistan
- Campus: Multan, Vehari, Lodhran
- Website: bzu.edu.pk

Bahauddin Zakariya University (BZU) (Urdu: جامعۂ بہاءالدین زکریا) is a public university with its main campus located in Multan, Punjab, Pakistan. Bahauddin Zakariya University was founded in 1975 as Multan University, and is today the second largest university in Punjab following University of the Punjab. It was renamed in 1979 in honour of the Punjabi Sufi saint Baha-ud-din Zakariya.

As a public sector degree awarding government university, it offers degrees in more than 60+ majors and minors courses in fields including biochemistry, pharmacy, engineering, humanities & social sciences, business & management sciences, law, arts, IT & computing, agriculture, farming and orientals (languages & literature).

== History ==
The university began its operations in 1975 in rented buildings with eight departments. Today, it has expanded into a vast campus with sixty departments and several constituent colleges, including Gilani Law College and Multan College of Arts. It also houses faculties such as Veterinary, Agricultural Science and Technology (FAST), and Engineering and Technology. Additionally, the university provides residential facilities for students and staff.

The Bahauddin Zakariya University is a local university, providing education in Arts and Science. Since agriculture is the mainstay of this region — the place and its environs produce the country's best silver crop (cotton) and fruit crops like mangoes, citrus, and dates — it was considered expedient to train manpower for solving agriculture problems. Accordingly, a College of Agriculture was established in 1989. The College of Agriculture and its complement, an Engineering College, form an integral part of the University Plan. The College of Engineering & Technology was established in 1994. Department of Commerce was started in November 1996. BBA classes were started in the Department of Business Administration in October 1996. Bachelor of Computer Science was introduced in the Department of Computer Science in November 1996, though Masters in Computer Science (MCS) was already running since 2003. B.Sc. Electrical Engineering class was started in November 2024. Information Technology Centre was established in July 1999. BS and MSc. Telecommunication System was started in January 2004. B.Sc. Mechanical, Computer, Textile, Agricultural and Architectural Engineering classes were started in fall 2004.

All degrees awarded by the university are recognized by Higher Education Commission of Pakistan (HEC), engineering degrees by Pakistan Engineering Council and pharmacy degrees by Pakistan Pharmacy Council also.

== Location ==
The university is 10 km from the city centre. The main campus is spread over 960 acres. Its back gate is 6 km from 'Chowk Kamharanwala'.

== Jurisdiction and sub-campuses ==
The main objective of Bahauddin Zakariya University is to provide facilities of higher education and research to the population of the southern region of the Punjab, covering the Civil Administrative Divisions of Multan and Dera Ghazi Khan. The university fulfills the triple function of teaching, affiliation and an examining body, and has 79 affiliated colleges which include old and prestigious institutions such as the Government Emerson College Multan, Government Post Graduate College, Sahiwal and Government College, Burewala. This university previously had sub-campuses in Sahiwal, Layyah and Dera Ghazi Khan, but now all of these campuses have been upgraded to universities, namely University of Sahiwal, University of Layyah and Ghazi University, respectively.

== Academic departments ==
=== Faculty of Arts and Social Sciences ===
- School of Economics
- Department of Education
- Institute of Social Sciences
- Department of Criminology
- Department of History
- Department of Gender Studies
- Department of Pakistan Studies
- Department of Geography
- Department of Political Science
- Department of International Relations
- Department of Communication Studies
- Department of Sociology
- Department of Applied Psychology
- Department of Philosophy
- Department of Sports Sciences
- Multan College of Arts

=== Faculty of Science ===
- Institute of Chemical Sciences
- Centre for Advanced Studies in Pure and Applied Mathematics
- Department of Computer Science
- Department of Information & Communication Technology
- Department of Communication & Cyber Security
- Institute of Physics
- Department of Statistics
- Institute of Botany
- Institute of Zoology
- Department of Microbiology
- Institute of Molecular Biology and Biotechnology
- Department of Biochemistry
- Department of Environmental Sciences

=== Faculty of Islamic Studies and Languages ===
- Department of Arabic
- Department of English
- Department of Islamic Studies
- Islamic Research Centre (IRC)
- Department of Urdu
- Saraiki Area Study Centre (SASC)
- Seerat Chair

=== Faculty of Commerce, Law and Business Administration ===
- Institute of Management Sciences (IMS)
- Alfalah Institute of Banking and Finance (AIBF)
- Department of Commerce
- Gillani Law College

=== Faculty of Pharmacy ===
- Department of Pharmacy

=== Faculty of Veterinary Sciences ===
- Department of Pathobiology
- Department of Biosciences
- Department of Clinical Sciences
- Department of Livestock and Poultry Productions

=== Faculty of Engineering and Technology ===
- University College of Engineering and Technology
- Department of Civil Engineering
- Department Of Electrical Engineering
- Department of Mechanical Engineering.
- Department of Building and Architectural Engineering
- Department of Computer Engineering
- Bahauddin Zakariya University College of Textile Engineering
- Institute of Advanced Materials

=== Faculty of Agricultural Sciences and Technology ===
Formerly it was called UCA or "University College of Agriculture" and now it is called FAST (Faculty of Agricultural Sciences and Technology).

FAST provides 8 major subjects for specialization after 2 year but for evening program only four.

- Department of Soil Science
- Department of Agronomy
- Department of Entomology
- Department of Plant Breeding and Genetics
- Department of Plant Pathology
- Department of Horticulture
- Department of Forestry and Range Management
- Department of Agri. Business and Marketing
- Department of Agricultural Engineering

=== Faculty of Food Science and Nutrition ===
- Department of Human Nutrition
- Department of Food Science and Technology
- Department of Animal Food Products Technology
- Department of Food Safety and Quality Management
- Center for Research in Food Safety Applied Nutrition

== Sub-Campuses ==
The following sub-campuses of Bahauddin Zakariya University have been opened:

- BZU Sub-Campus, Vehari
- BZU Sub-Campus, Lodhran

== Rankings ==
According to the Times Higher Education (THE) Ranking System, Bahauddin Zakariya University is ranked within Top 1200 highly ranked universities worldwide.

University rankings

Global – Overall
- QS World: 1201–1400 (2025)

Regional – Overall
- QS Asia: 301–350 (2025)

In 2019, the university was also ranked 8th nationally by General Universities Category of Higher Education Commission of Pakistan (HEC).

== Hostels ==
The following are the hostels accommodating students:

For boys

- Abubaker Hall
- Umar Hall
- Usman Hall
- Ali Hall
- Hamza Hall
- Qasim Hall
- Mohsin Hall
- Abdul Sattar Edhi Hall

For girls

- Fatima Hall
- Marium Hall
- Ayesha Hall
- Amna Hall
- Zainab Hall
- Khadija Hall
- Hajira Hall

== Notable alumni ==
- Rubina Feroze Bhatti, human rights activist
- Sardar Usman Buzdar, ex-Chief Minister Punjab
- Saima Akram Chaudhry, novel, drama writer
- Gharida Farooqi, news anchor
- Abida Hussain, former Minister Food and Agriculture
- Kashif Javed, VP of Finance
- Rauf Kalasra, investigation journalist
- Zafarullah Khan, lawyer
- Ali Akbar Natiq, poet And writer

== See also ==
- List of Islamic educational institutions
