= Rabiah Jamil Beg =

Pakistani journalist

- Occupations: Journalist and Human Rights Activist
- Known for: N-Peace Award recipient

Rabiah Jamil Beg is a correspondent and producer for the Pakistani television network Geo. She has been the pioneer member of the Voice of America's Urdu Magazine show "Khabron Sey Agey" aired from Washington DC to report on Pakistani diaspora and news related to South Asian region. She reports from a wide variety of areas throughout Pakistan such as Balochistan, Khyber Pakhtunkhwa, Punjab, and Sindh. Her topics include conflict, humanitarian crises, insurgencies, politics, and social issues. She is referred to as the only woman journalist reporting from dangerous areas in Pakistan. In 2014 Rabiah Jamil Beg was awarded the UNDP's N-Peace Award in the category of "Breaking Stereotypes– Women and Media". She has joined the ranks of late Asma Jehangir and many other prominent personalities who have been awarded this prestigious award since its inception.
