= Quhramaana Kakar =

Afghan activist

- Occupation: Activist
- Known for: N-Peace Award recipient

Quhramaana Kakar is an Afghan female activist and peacemaker. In 2012 she won the N-Peace Award.

== Biography ==
Kakar became an Afghan refugee to Pakistan after the events in 2001. This led her to become active in the peace building process and specifically to work to include women in the process. From 2010 to 2012 Kakar served as gender adviser to the Afghanistan Peace and Reintegration Program (APRP). Her education includes an MPhil from the University of Cambridge. She is the founder of the non-governmental organization Women for Peace and Participation based in London and Kabul. In 2012 she was awarded the N-Peace Award as a Role Model for Peace. She was a visiting fellow at the London School of Economics' Centre for Women, Peace and Security.

Kakar has written several opinion pieces for various publications including openDemocracy, Thomson Reuters Foundation News, and The Washington Post. She is a Senior Strategic Advisor for Conciliation Resources.
