= Rupika De Silva =

Sri Lankan women's rights activist

- Occupation: Activist
- Known for: Women's rights advocate

Rupika Damayanthi De Silva is a Sri Lankan peace and women's rights activist. She is the founder of the non-governmental organization Saviya Development Foundation which supports peace building, and women and children's rights. She has worked to unify women's voices in Sri Lanka through an exchange program of Sinhala women in the north of Sri Lanka and Tamil women in the south. In 2004 De Silva worked to help women affected by the Indian Ocean earthquake and tsunami.

In 2012 De Silva was the recipient of the N-Peace Award as a role model for peace. She is a member of the Organization for Women in Science for the Developing World (OWSD).
