= Wijaya Putra University =

University in Surabaya, Indonesia

Coordinates: 7.2437°S 112.6324°E

Universitas Wijaya Putra
- Motto: Modern Campus With Entrepreneurship Spirit
- Established: 1981
- Rector: Budi Endarto, S.H., M.Hum.
- Location: Surabaya, East Java, Indonesia
- Campus: Urban Campus A: Raya Benowo St. 1-3
- Website: uwp.ac.id

Wijaya Putra University is a university in Surabaya, Indonesia, established in 1981.

== Alumni ==
- Gatot Sudjito
- Makmur HAPK
