= Thavachsri Charles Vijayaratnam =

Sri Lankan social activist

- Born: Kilinochchi, Northern Province, Sri Lanka
- Occupation: social activist
- Awards: N-Peace Awards (2013)

Thavachsri Charles Vijayaratnam (Tamil: தவச்சிறீ சார்லஸ் விஜயரத்தினம்) is a Sri Lankan social activist and women's rights activist. She is the co-founder of the Kilinochchi District Women's Development Federation, an NGO providing psychosocial support and social integration programmes for service users. She is well known for rendering community service for over three decades. In October 2013, she won the Role Models for Peace Award.

== Biography ==
She was born and raised up in a remote village in Kilinochchi. Her family endured extreme poverty and famines during her childhood and also spent most of her childhood life amid the Sri Lankan Civil War.

== Career ==
She became a prominent social activist and assisted orphans and disabled children to access education who were affected from the civil war. She has also advocated for women's rights and has also helped struggling women in the Northern Province by paving way to obtain essentials. Thavachsri was a recipient of the N-Peace Awards in 2013 as she was awarded for promoting the improvement of the lives of marginalised peoples in rural communities in Sri Lanka. She is also the only Sri Lankan to have won the role model award in the field of humanity.
