= Gharida Farooqi =

Pakistani television anchor (born 1978)

Gharidah Farooqi
- غریدہ فاروقی
- Born: 10 April 1978 (age 48); Riyadh, Kingdom of Saudi Arabia
- Citizenship: Pakistani
- Education: Master in International relations from Bahauddin Zakariya University
- Occupation: Journalism
- Years active: 2002–present
- Awards: Tamgha-e-Imtiaz (2023)

Gharidah Farooqi (Urdu: غریدہ فاروقی) is a Pakistani television host and anchorperson who was once part of Pakistan's biggest media group, Geo News.

== Early life and career ==
Gharida Farooqi was born in Multan, Pakistan. She received her master's degree in International Relations from Bahauddin Zakariya University, Multan, Pakistan.

Gharida Farooqi started her career with PTV News as a newscaster and worked there from 2005 to 2007. She moved to Dunya News in 2007 for a short time. Later in 2008, she started working for Geo News and worked there until 2012.

In September 2015, Gharida Farooqi interviewed Rana Sanaullah Khan, Law Minister in the provincial government of Punjab, Pakistan on her TV show G for Gharida.

As recently as 2024, 'Coalition For Women In Journalism', a New York-based non-profit organization, published an article showing a 'Timeline of Events' from 2016 to 2024 about organized harassment campaigns against Gharida Farooqi showing how journalists become victims of cross-fire among rival political parties in Pakistan.

== Child abuse incident settlement ==
On 25 July 2017, Lahore police recovered a fifteen year old maid from Farooqi's home, where she had been allegedly kept in illegal detention and tortured.

On 23 August 2017, Farooqi reached a settlement with the maid's mother. Gharida Farooqi was never convicted in a court of law in Pakistan of any alleged abuse of the child worker. The child worker's mother, Nasima reportedly stated later that 'she is now not pursuing the case against the anchorperson'.
