= Mi Kun Chan Non =

Women's rights activist in Myanmar (Burma)

Mi Kun Chan Non is a Burmese women's rights activist and peacemaker of Mon descent. She has been the chair of the Mon Women's Organization (MWO) since 1999 and chair of the Alliance for Gender Inclusion in the Peace Process in Myanmar since 2016. Mi Kun Chan Non has been fighting for women's empowerment in Mon State communities for over two decades and was awarded the N-Peace Award in 2014 for her efforts and "working tirelessly to build a voice and fight for the rights of minority women".

== Career ==
Mi Kun studied grassroots leadership training, educational movements, and business correspondence at the British Council. She earned a master's degree in Development Studies from the Kimmage Development Study Centre in Dublin in 2004. After the ceasefire agreement was reached between the Burmese government and the ethnic Karen rebels in 2012, she highlighted the opportunity for improvement and change in women's rights. In response, she arranged leadership training and educational seminars for disadvantaged Mon women in Thai-Burmese border settlements. Her program aims to encourage women to challenge established gender conventions and assume leadership roles in government, giving them a voice in political and economic issues that affect their lives.

Mi Kin has served as an advisor and donor relations advisor for the Mon National Education Committee. She was an advocate for peace and was among the "interested parties" who participated in the Union Peace Conference – 21st Century Panglong held in Naypyidaw in 2016.
