= Lalmani Chaudhary =

Nepali politician

- लाल मणि चौधरी
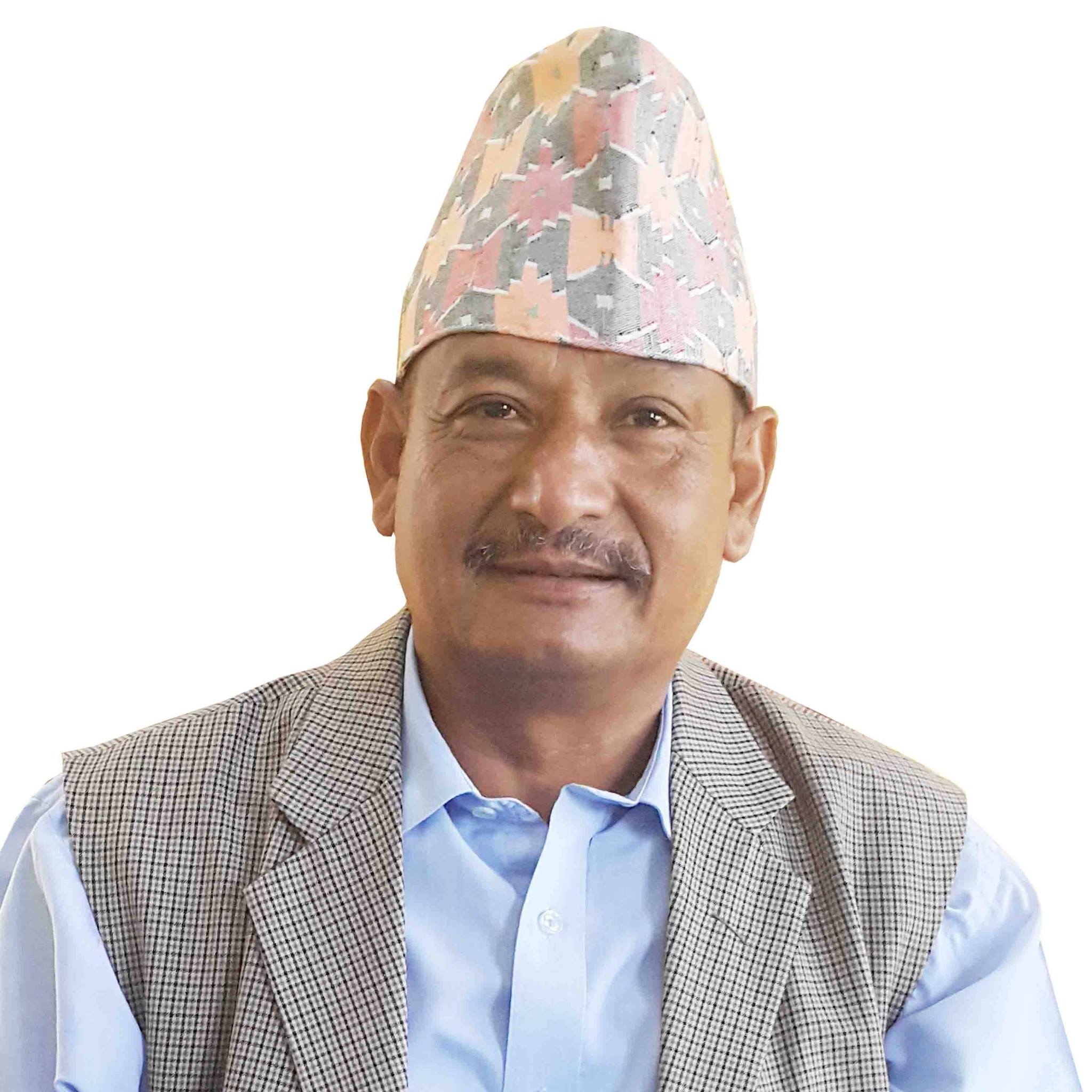

Member of the Constituent Assembly
- In office 28 May 2008 – 28 May 2012
- Preceded by: Sabitri Bogati (as Member of Parliament)
- Succeeded by: Surendra Pandey
- Constituency: Chitwan 1

Mayor of Khairahani
- In office ???
- Deputy: Sunita Kharel Thapaliya (Nepali Congress)
- Succeeded by: Shashi Kumar Khaniya

Personal details
- Born: Parsa, Chitwan, Nepal
- Party: CPN (UML)

Lalmani Chaudhary is a Nepali politician who is a member of the Communist Party of Nepal. He is also a former member of House of Representatives and former Moyar of Khairahani Municipality.
