= Shashi Kumary Adhikary =

- Occupations: Lawyer, Activist
- Awards: N-Peace Awards (2013)

Shashi Kumary Adhikary is a Nepalese lawyer and women's rights activist. She serves as a Senior Advocate at the Supreme Court of Nepal and a professor of law at Tribhuvan University. In 2013, she was awarded the N-Peace Award in the "Role Models for Peace" category for her contributions to gender justice and legal aid in Nepal.
