= Ja Nan Lahtaw =

Kachin peace activist from Myanmar

Ja Nan Lahtaw (Burmese: ဂျာနန်လထော်; born 1965) is a Kachin peace activist and humanitarian from Myanmar. She is executive director of the Nyein (Shalom) Foundation, a non-governmental organization committed to fostering peace and development in conflict-affected regions of the country Ja Nan Lahtaw has been involved in Myanmar’s peace process for over two decades, serving as a negotiator, facilitator, and technical adviser to the government, the Tatmadaw, and various ethnic armed organizations (EAOs).

== Early life and education ==
Ja Nan Lahtaw was born in 1965 in Myitkyina, Kachin State, Myanmar. She was raised in a Kachin Baptist family, and her upbringing was shaped by the prolonged civil conflict in the region. Her father, Saboi Jum, a Baptist and former director general of the Kachin Baptist Convention (KBC), along with his son, mediated the first written ceasefire between the Tatmadaw and the KIO in 1994, which maintained peace for 17 years. She pursued higher education and became involved in community development and social work in the 1990s. She earned a bachelor's degree from Cairn University in 1993. She earned a master's degree in Conflict Transformation from Eastern Mennonite University in Virginia, United States, and was a Chevening Fellow at the University of Birmingham, United Kingdom, in 2008.

== Peace activism ==
After completing her education in the United States, in 2002 Ja Nan joined the Nyein Foundation, which had been established by her father in 2000. Since 2014, she has served as the executive director of the Nyein (Shalom) Foundation. The organization was established to create neutral spaces for dialogue and to help bridge the deep-seated mistrust between warring parties in Myanmar. Under her leadership, the Nyein Foundation has played a significant role in conflict mediation, offering technical support and strategic advice to both the government and EAOs. It has been particularly active in the Kachin conflict, which resumed in 2011 after the 17-year ceasefire between the KIO and the Tatmadaw ended.

She served as a technical adviser and facilitator during the talks that led to the Nationwide Ceasefire Agreement (NCA), a landmark but contested agreement signed in 2015. Following the agreement, she continued to support implementation negotiations. Beginning in January 2016, when the formal Political Dialogue process was launched, she acted as an overall co-facilitator and also specifically co-facilitated sessions themed around politics. She also served as a technical consultant to the Kachin Independence Organisation's Technical Advisory Team. As a Cairn University alumna, she was featured in the universit's 2015 alumni magazine for her leadership role in Myanmar’s peace process.

== Publications ==
In October 2020, she authored an article for ConstitutionNet on the November general elections and their significance for federalisation and inclusive dialogue in Myanmar.

In 2022, she published a report titled Civil Society Contributions to Myanmar's Peace Process through Swisspeace.

== Recognition ==
In 2015, Ja Nan Lahtaw was awarded the N-Peace Award in the "Untold Stories" category.

She was one of the three inaugural recipients of the Schuman Award from the European Union in 2017.
