= Kumroj =

Kumroj कुमरोज
- Kumroj
- Location in Nepal
- Coordinates: 27.57°N 84.55°E
- Country: Nepal
- Zone: Narayani Zone
- Bagmati Province: Chitwan District

Government
  - Mayor (Khairahani Municipality ): Shashi Khaniya

Population (2011)
  - Total: 8,082
- Time zone: UTC+5:45 (Nepal Time)
- Postal Code Of Khairahani: 44203
- Area code: 056

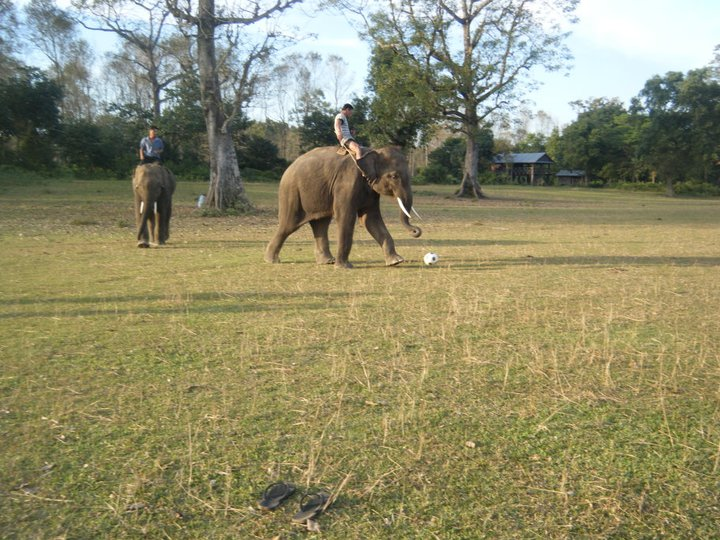
This picture is taken in saurah, neighbour VDC of Kumroj .

Kumroj is a town in Khairhani Municipality in Chitwan District in the Narayani Zone of southern Nepal. The municipality was promulgated on 18 May 2014 by merging the existing Khairahani, Kumroj and Chainpur VDCs. Kumroj is 190 km south-west of the Kathmandu Valley stationed in the Rapti valley, also known as the Inner Terai or Dun. The village is situated at an altitude of 1000 ft above the sea level surrounded by two mountain ranges; the mahabharat ranges of hills on the north and the churiya siwalik hills on the south. The main point of attraction is the Chitwan National Park which today stands as a successful testimony of nature conservation in south Asia Region. Historically it was established in 1973 as the first national park of the Nepal to preserve a unique ecosystems significantly valuable to the whole world en routing this area on the World Heritage Site list in 1984. In the near future, this town would be one of the potential Eco-tourism village destination. Kumroj is dedicated to protect the wild animals, community forest and the Chitwan national park. Once the Southern belt of Nepal was afflicted by malaria epidemics. Tharu, the native tribe, were able to thrive even in malaria. As malaria subsided, more and more people started migrating in this place in the search of arable land, which eventually made Kumroj as a multicultural and multiethinic place. Irrigated low land has been the main stud of agriculture, permitting Rice-Rice-Pulse cropping pattern feasible.

== Geography ==
=== Climate ===
There are three distinct seasons in this town. Winter starts from early November averaging 15-18 °C day and 3-6 °C night temperatures. Following winter comes the Summer from early April reaching 37-42 °C day and 25-28 °C night temperature, with around 40 % relative humidity. Third season is the monsoon, starting from July. During this time humidity is about 100% and on average we receive 100 mm of rain a day.

=== Vegetation ===
There are two main types of habitat in Kumroj: Tropical riverine forest and grass land which are important habitats for wild animals and birds.

=== Fauna ===
Kumroj community forest consists of 1,300 hectors of land which is connected to Chitwan National Park. In the community forest animal species including deer, sambar, chital, and barking deer, are found throughout the forest. The one-horned rhinoceros is commonly found and attracts many tourists to the community each year. Other mammalian species includes Bengal tigers, leopards, sloth bears, small Indian civets, and wild boars. Additionally, wild elephants are occasionally seen in the forest. Various reptile and bird species are also been found.

== Economy ==
Kumroj is a largely agricultural-based community. The main crops are rice, wheat, maize, mustard and various kind of seasonal vegetables. Water buffalo, cattle and goats are common livestock in the community. Selling dairy milk is the second occupation for some community members, and nowadays there are more different kinds of businesses like grocery shops, agricultural supply depot, stationery stores, tailoring.

Kumroj is gradually running community development and tourism development and infrastructure. Inside the community forest there are two watchtowers where visitors and tourists can spend the night to watch wild animals. The fee for staying overnight goes to community development and forest management. Elephant safaris are held in Kumroj community forest, along with jungle hiking.

Kumroj declared Kumroj VDC as the first Model Biogas VDC at a special ceremony organized in Kumroj on June 2 on the occasion of World Environment Day, 2013. Around 80% of total households of the VDC have installed biogas plants with attached toilets.

There is a dairy in Kumroj, with a milk cooling centre to preserve the milk in warm weather. There is also a co-operative bank, providing retail banking and personal loans.

== Village ==
Kumroj is divided in nine different villages.

- Ward 1 Harnari
- ward 2 Bairiya
- Ward 3 Gawai
- Ward 4 Dharampur
- Ward 5 Kumroj
- Ward 6 Janakpur
- Ward 7 Sisahani
- Ward 8 Kapiya
- Ward 9 Ghokrela

Religion In kumroj VDC there are many temples, including RAM JANAKI TEMPLE, which is situated in ward number 6, JANAKPUR village.

Janakpur is one of the most important villages in this vdc. It has its own history and culture. The village is almost covered by forest, where one most important community forest located there.

Ram Janaki Community Forest is located in this village, which is important home for valuable wildlife animals . Ram Janaki community Forest recently started jungle stay program for nature lover.

Janakpur is also known as Eco village . You can see wildlife animals like leopards, bear, boar and birds from every house from this village .

Janakpur have 90% literacy rate . And where one primary school is there, which run by villagers and some Donner. School called "Janakpur Primary School " which offer free education for children.

== Gallery ==
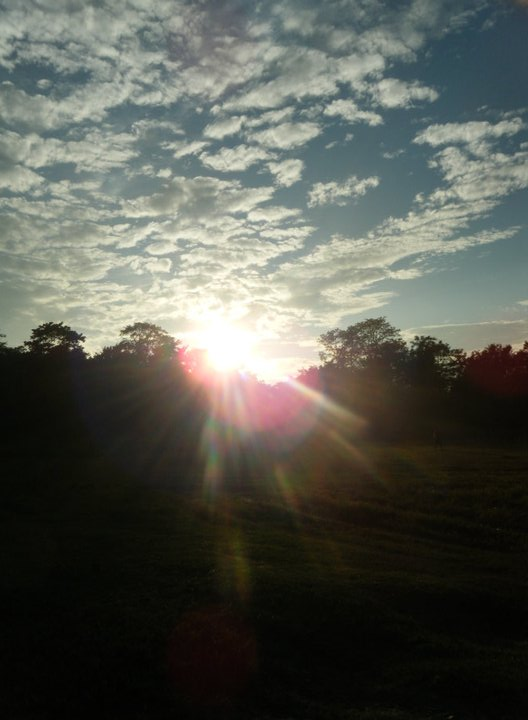
Sunny day catch from the Ramjanaki community Forest

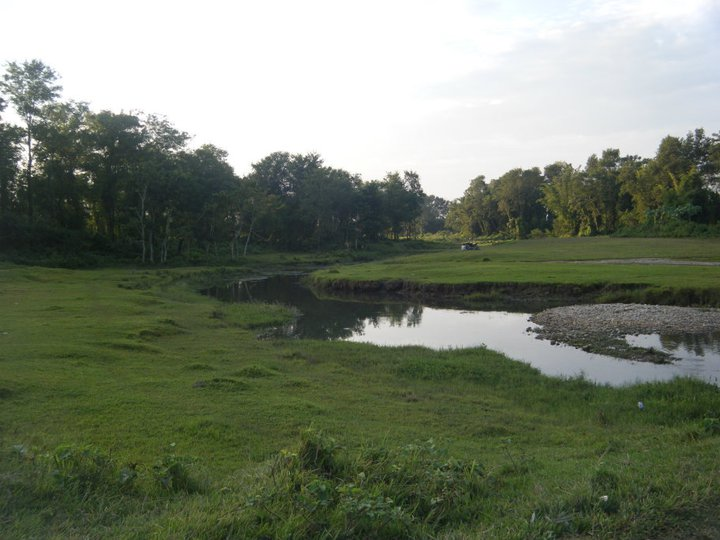
River and green landscape of Janakpur

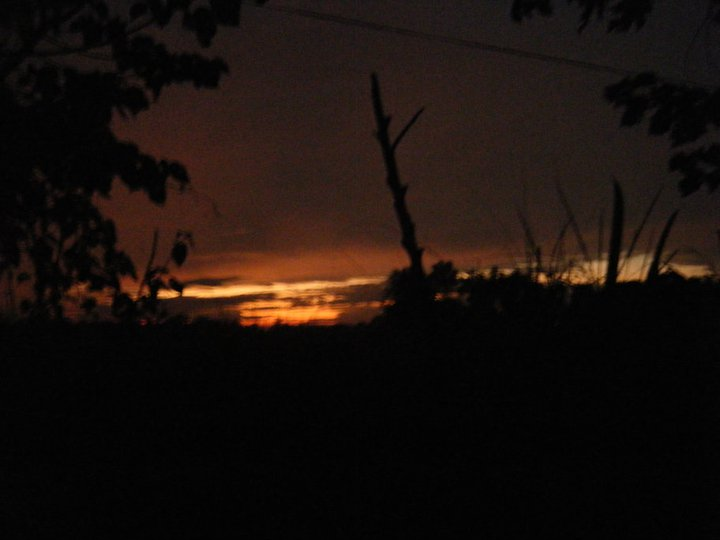
sunset view from Janakpur Roundabout

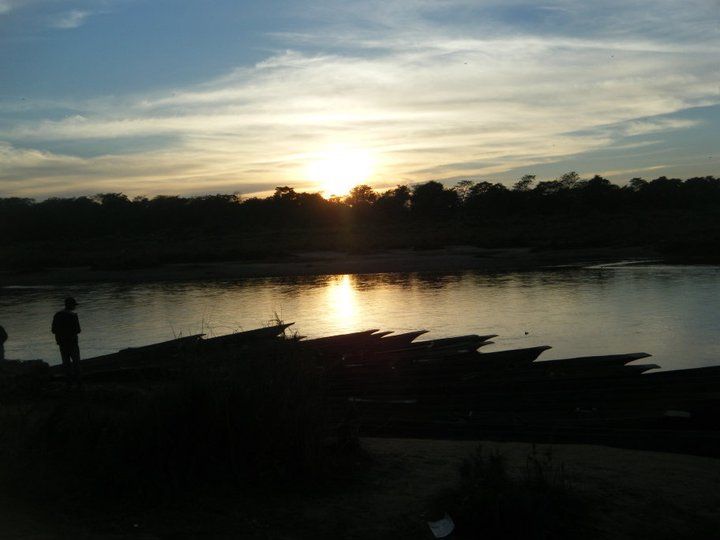
Sunset viewed from the banks of Rapti River

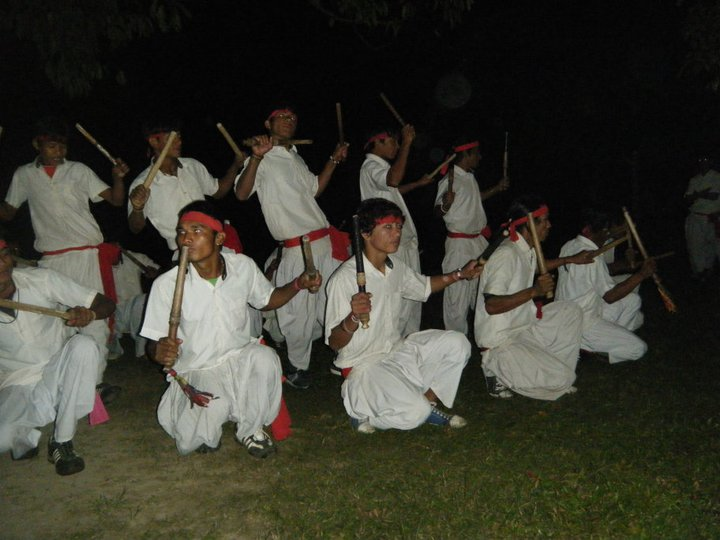
Cultural program of Native Tharu community :# Rupak
