= Electronita Duan =

Indonesian peace activist

- Other name: Eton
- Occupation: Activist
- Known for: N-Peace Award recipient

Electronita Duan is the Indonesian founder of Politeknik Pembangunan Halmahera, and recipient of the N-Peace Award in 2011.

Duan became involved with conflict resolution and peacebuilding following the Maluku sectarian conflict in North Halmahera, Indonesia. She founded Politeknik Pembangunan Halmahera an institute of higher education formed to provided education to students whose studies were interrupted by the conflict. She has also been an advocate of the Asian Muslim Action Network (AMAN) Women's Schools for Peace and worked with the Search for Common Ground organization to tell her story of peacebuilding in the Maluku Islands, In 2011 Duan was one of inaugural recipients of the N-Peace Award.
