= Wai Wai Nu =

Burmese human rights activist (born 1987)

- ဝေဝေနု
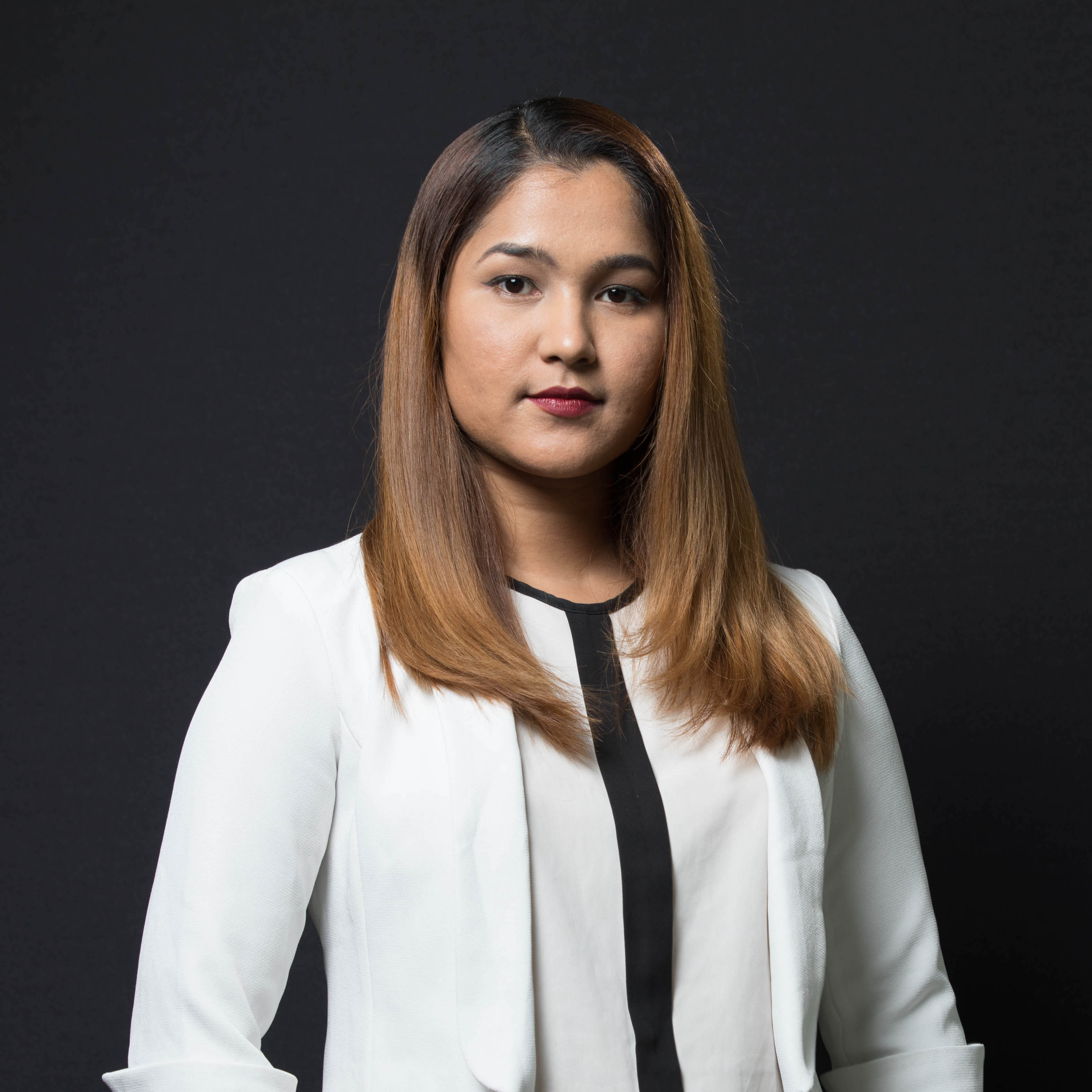
- Born: 1987 (age 38–39); Buthidaung, Myanmar
- Education: University of East Yangon University of California, Berkeley
- Occupation: Political activist
- Parent(s): U Kyaw Min and Teza
- Awards: Hillary Clinton Award (2018)

Wai Wai Nu (Burmese: ဝေဝေနု; born 1987) is a Burmese human rights activist. She was listed one of the BBC 100 Women in 2014. In 2017, she was named one of Time magazine's Next Generation Leaders. She is an ethnic Rohingya.

== Early life ==
Wai Wai Nu was born in 1987 in Buthidaung, Rakhine State, Myanmar to Rohingya parents. She grew up in Buthidaung. Her family moved to Yangon in 1993 because of her father's political activism; Kyaw Min continually fought for labor rights and was harassed by the junta. Wai Wai Nu was admitted into the University of East Yangon to study law at age 16.

== Imprisonment ==
When Wai Wai Nu was 18 years old in 2005, her parents and almost all their children were arrested. She was in her second year of law school at Yangon East university. Her father had been voted in as a member of Parliament as part of the National League for Democracy (NLD) in the 1990 general election, but the military junta refused to recognize the election as he was the member of an opposition party. According to The New York Times, "At least 400 members of the [National] League [for Democracy] were arrest[ed] in 1990" directly after winning the election. It is unclear why U Kyaw Min, Wai Wai Nu's father, was not arrested in 1990 along with the four hundred or so members of the National League for Democracy and the many other democracy activists who were arrested in the aftermath of the 1990 general election. It was only in 2005 (fifteen years after the 1990 election) that Wai Wai Nu and her family were arrested. 2005 was the same year that General Khin Nyunt, Burma's "Evil Prince", was sentenced to 44 years in prison after falling from power. The family did not have any legal representation, and the judge did not take any notes during the trial. Although in some articles it is stated that her parents and siblings, along with Wai Wai Nu, were convicted of breaking the immigration law named a threat to the state, in other interviews her father has stated that he was charged with "sedition". She was sentenced to 17 years in Insein Prison in Yangon; she was kept in a large room together with her sister and mother while her father received a sentence 47 years in solitary confinement, and her brother was sent to a separate prison. While in prison, Wai Wai Nu spoke to women imprisoned with her, and learned their stories, later calling her imprisonment a "life education." The whole family was freed in January 2012, at the age of 25 after president Thein Sein declared amnesty. Her sister contracted Hepatitis C and father developed a heart condition due to bad prison conditions.

== Activism and university education ==
Wai Wai Nu went on to earn her law degree by continuing her studies at Yangon East University. She then enrolled in a British-Council-organized one-year political education program. She also went to other political trainings.

Wai Wai Nu founded two NGOs – Women's Peace Network-Arakan and Justice for Women. Through Women's Peace Network, she focuses on peace-building in Myanmar for all people of any gender, ethnicity and religion. Justice for Women is a network of female lawyers that provide legal aid for women in need. Wai Wai Nu educates women on issues relating to abuse, such as domestic violence and sexual harassment. Wai Wai Nu launched a successful Twitter campaign called "#MyFriend," that aimed to show friendships between diverse individuals to promote tolerance.

Wai Wai Nu has also spoken at many organizations. In 2017, she spoke to the Oslo Freedom Forum. She also has advocated at the United Nations on the human rights situation in Burma. Wai Wai Nu has been invited to both the United States White House and the United States Congress multiple times.

Wai Wai Nu earned her Master of Laws degree from the University of California, Berkeley in 2018.

== Honors and awards ==
In 2014, Wai Wai Nu received the N-Peace Award. In 2015, she was named one of the Top 100 Global Thinkers by Foreign Policy Magazine. Also in 2015, she participated in the inaugural class of a training program for young leaders held at the George W. Bush Presidential Center. The program, called the Liberty and Leadership Forum, was focused on democratic transition training. In 2016, she was named one of Salt and Diageo's 100 Inspiring Women by Salt Magazine. In 2017, she was named one of the Next Generation Leaders by Time magazine. In 2018, she received the Hillary Clinton Award from Georgetown University. In 2019, she was selected as an Obama Foundation Scholar at Columbia University. The following year, she was selected as a Genocide Prevention Fellow by the United States Holocaust Memorial Museum. In 2021, she received the City of Athens Democracy Award from The Democracy & Culture Foundation.
