= Chainpur, Chitwan =

Chainpur चैनपुर
- Location in Nepal
- Coordinates: 27.65°N 84.58°E
- Country: Nepal
- Province: Bagmati Province
- District: Chitwan District

Population (2011)
  - Total: 16,786
- Time zone: UTC+5:45 (Nepal Time)

Chainpur is a town in Khairhani Municipality in Chitwan District in Bagmati Province of southern Nepal. The municipality was established on 18 May 2014 by merging the existing Khairahani Municipality, Kumroj and Chainpur VDCs. At the time of the 1991 Nepal census it had a population of 9960 people living in 1781 individual households.
