= Gatot Sudjito =

Indonesian politician (1960–2021)

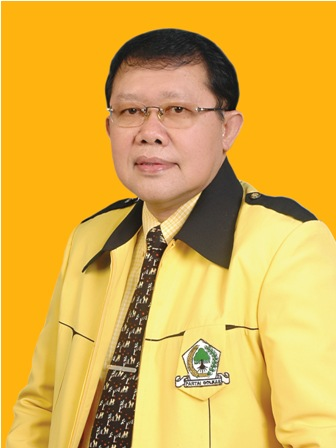

Member of the People's Representative Council
- In office 1 October 2014 – 18 January 2021
- President: Joko Widodo
- Constituency: East Java VII (Pacitan, Ponorogo, Trenggalek, Magetan, Ngawi)

Member of East Java Regional People's Representative Council
- In office 31 August 2004 – 31 August 2014
- Governor: Soekarwo; Khofifah Indar Parawansa
- Constituency: East Java 7 (Pacitan, Ponorogo, Trenggalek, Magetan, Ngawi)

Member of Surabaya Regional People's Representative Council
- In office 1999–2004

Personal details
- Born: 28 October 1960 Sidoarjo, East Java, Indonesia
- Died: 18 January 2021 (aged 60) Malang, East Java, Indonesia
- Cause of death: COVID-19
- Party: Golkar
- Education: Jember State University (Drs.); Wijaya Putra University (M.Si.); 17 August 1945 University Surabaya (Dr.)

Gatot Sudjito (28 October 1960 – 18 January 2021) was an Indonesian politician from the Golkar party who served as a member of the Surabaya Regional People's Representative Council from 1999 until 2004, Member of the East Java Regional People's Representative Council from 1997 until 1999 and 2004 until 2014, and Member of the People's Representative Council from 2014 until his death.

== Early life and education ==
Gatot Sudjito was born on 28 October 1960 in Sidoarjo, East Java. Gatot began his education at the Ketegan Taman Elementary School in 1966 and finished in 1972. He continued his studies at the Taman Sidoarjo Junior High School Number 1 from 1972 until 1975 and at the State Mechanical High School No. 3 in Blitar from 1975 until 1979.

Gatot enrolled at the Jember State University in 1981 and graduated from the university in 1987 with a doctorandus degree. In 2002, while still serving at the Surabaya Regional People's Representative Council, Gatot attended the Wijaya Putra University to pursue master of science degree, and graduated in 2004. Ten years after that, he graduated with a doctor title from the 17 August University in Surabaya.

== Political career ==
=== In the Golkar party ===
Gatot joined the party in 1992 and became the head of youth affairs in the party's branch in Surabaya. Eight years later, he rose through the ranks and became the chairman of the party's branch in Surabaya. Gatot later became the secretary of the party in East Java from 2000 until 2004 and the deputy chairman from 2004 until 2015. Gatot also served as the Chairman of the East Java Familial Consultative Organization of Mutual Assistance — an organization which was affiliated to Golkar — from 2011 until 2016.

=== Parliamentary career ===
Gatot held his first office as a member of a council when he was elected to the East Java Regional People's Representative Council in the 1997 Indonesian legislative election. His term was supposed to end in 2002, but political reformations in Indonesia shortened it into a two-year term which ended in 1999. Gatot then ran as a candidate for the Surabaya Regional People's Representative Council in the 1999 Indonesian legislative election and won a seat in the elections. Gatot was inaugurated on 24 August 1999 and held the seat for five years.

In the 2004 Indonesian legislative election, Gatot ran again for the East Java Regional People's Representative Council from the East Java 7 electoral district. He won the elections and was subsequently elected for a second term. Gatot then ran for a national office as a member of the People's Representative Council in the 2014 Indonesian legislative election. He secured a seat in the council and was re-elected in 2019. During his tenure in the People's Representative Council, Gatot Sudjito was seated in the Commission V.

== Personal life ==
Gatot was married to Retno Indah. The couple had one child.

== Death ==
Gatot died at 03.00 on 18 January 2021, in Saiful Anwar Hospital, Malang, due to COVID-19 during the COVID-19 pandemic in Indonesia. Overall, Gatot was the fifth member of the People's Representative Council to die of COVID-19.
