= Valentina Sagala =

Indonesian activist

- Born: August 9, 1977; Jakarta, Indonesia
- Other names: Rotua Valentina Sagala
- Occupation: Activist
- Known for: N-Peace Award recipient

Rotua Valentina Sagala is an Indonesian women's rights activist and activist for law and human rights. In 2013 she won the N-Peace Award.

== Biography ==
Sagala was born on August 9, 1977, in Jakarta. In 1998 she founded the Institut Perempuan (Women's Institute), a non-profit organization that fights for women's rights and consistently advocates for laws protecting women and children, monitors policy formulation and law enforcement, and also runs schools for feminists. In 2001 she received her bachelor’s degree and in 2006 earned her law Master’s degree. She went on to teach Human Rights Law at the Parahyangan Catholic University.

In 2013 Sagala was awarded the N-Peace Award as a Role Models for Peace. In 2014 she was named as one of the Women on the Rise by GlobeAsia Magazine. In 2015 PeaceWomen Across the Globe (PWAG) named her a Woman of Peace.
