= Filomena Barros dos Reis =

East Timorese peace and women's rights activist

- Occupation: justice activist
- Known for: N-Peace Award recipient

Filomena Barros dos Reis is an East Timorese social justice activist and recipient of the N-Peace Award in 2011.

Reis was an early member of the women's human rights organization Forum Komunikasaun ba Feto Timor (FOKUPERS) which was founded in 1997. Growing out of a women's health workshop, the group has a mission to advocate for women's rights as well as women's health. She went on to join the East Timor Action Network (ETAN) where she speaks internationally to raise awareness of violence to East Timorese women. She has also served as is the project coordinator for peace-building development with the Asia Pacific Support Collective in Timor-Leste.

In 2011 Reis was one of the inaugural recipients of the N-Peace Award.

== See also ==
- Indonesian occupation of East Timor
- 1999 East Timorese crisis
