= Azeem Azhar =

British entrepreneur (born 1972)

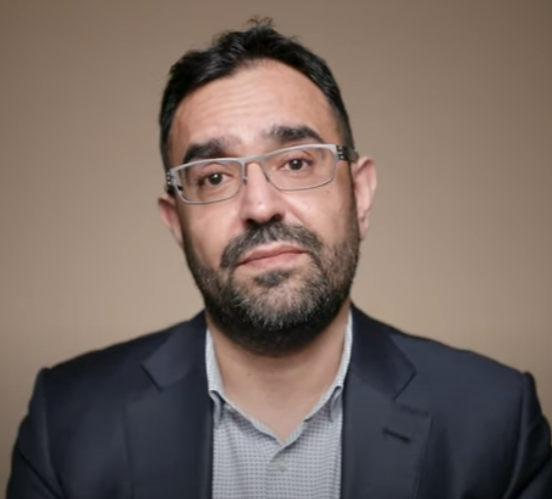
- Born: 1972 (age 53–54)
- Education: Oxford University
- Occupations: Technology entrepreneur and author

Azeem Azhar (born 1972) is a British technology entrepreneur and author. He founded the research group, Exponential View, and web technology company, PeerIndex.

Azhar wrote The Exponential Age: How Accelerating Technology is Transforming Business, Politics and Society, and hosts the podcast Exponential View, distributed by Harvard Business Review, and the Bloomberg Originals television show and podcast Exponentially with Azeem Azhar. He writes about the topics of AI, renewable energy, and tech more broadly.

== Early life and education ==
Azhar was born in 1972. He studied Philosophy, Politics and Economics at Merton College, Oxford University.

== Career ==
In the 1990s, Azhar became a journalist, as a technology correspondent for The Guardian, where he published stories on the internet and designed the online (Go2) platform. He later became the business correspondent for The Economist. From 1997 to 1999, he was also a strategy manager for the BBC as well as launched the BBC Online. In 2005, he became head of innovation for Reuters. In 2004, Azhar was appointed to the Ofcom Communications Consumer Panel.

Azhar founded eSouk.com in 2000 and has also held leadership positions at Albert Inc., a data analytics and marketing company in 2002, and OxMedia Ltd, a management consultancy company in 2004. He founded PeerIndex, a social media analytics company in 2009. PeerIndex won the Europas Grand Prix in 2011, and was acquired by Brandwatch in 2014.

In 2015, Azhar founded Exponential View, a research group that creates newsletters about AI and technological transformations. It was described by the Boise State Public Radio as the "leading newsletter and podcast on the impact of technology on our future economy and society".

Azhar is the host of the Bloomberg Originals television show and podcast Exponentially with Azeem Azhar.

Azhar is a member of the World Economic Forum's Expert Network and co-chair of its Global Future Council on the Future of Complex Risks. He is also an executive fellow at Harvard Business School, and a Visiting Fellow at the University of Oxford. He is also a Digital Fellow at Stanford University's Digital Economy Lab.

== Publications ==
The Exponential Age: How Accelerating Technology is Transforming Business, Politics and Society (2021).

== Accolades ==
Azhar was named to the Vox 2023 Future Perfect 50 list. He was named to the 2023 Charter 30 list.
