= Visaka Dharmadasa =

Sri Lankan peace activist (born 1960)

Visaka Dharmadasa (born 1960) is a Sri Lankan peace activist. She is the founder and chair of Association of War Affected Women and Parents of Servicemen Missing in Action.

== Education ==
Dharmadasa holds a degree in negotiations and mediation skills from the United States Institute for Peace, Washington, and in women and security from Harvard University and Cambridge, USA.

== Activism ==
During Sri Lanka's civil war, Visaka's sons joined the military. To stop war and prevent death of her sons, Visaka started the Kandy-based Association for War Affected Families. This association spreads information about "how we have to do something to stop the war ripping our country apart".

On September 27, 1998 the LTTE attacked the Sri Lankan military base in Kilinochchi. Her son Achintha Senarath went missing as well as 608 other soldiers. After the attack Association of Parents of Servicemen Missing in Action (PSMIA) was found by Dharmadasa. The members of PSMIA are dedicated to uncovering the fate of soldiers missing in action, advocating for the release of detainees, and promoting peace in Sri Lanka. The Association helped solve several issues, including the issue of identification tags to all soldiers and the expedited registration and tracing process of the International Committee of the Red Cross.

As the PSMIA advocated for change within the Sri Lankan military, Dharmadasa took her passion for peace directly to the Tamil rebels. Dharmadasa believes that contact and communication are essential in the peacebuilding process between the rebels and the government. She initiated talks between opposing sides in the conflict and designed the Track II dialogue process that helped broker a ceasefire and ultimate end to the civil war.

The PSMIA established the Association of War Affected Women. It and the Parents of Servicemen Missing in Action continue to work for peace. They bring communities together, provide conflict resolution trainings for women, and assist those affected by the 2004 tsunami.

In 2009 Association of War Affected Women initiated a campaign to make the promise of UN Security Council Resolution 1325 a reality. As Dharmadasa says, "You can't just say, 'Include women, include women.' You have to show the capacities of women." With this in mind, AWAW prepare women to campaign for government office and become effective leaders. So far, they have trained 500 women and have begun workshops with 750 more women from across Sri Lanka.

She is also the gender focal point for GPPAC in Sri Lanka, as well as Director of the board of National Peace Council and PAFFREL of Sri Lanka.

== Awards ==
Dharmadasa was awarded the Humanitarian award for 2006 by the Inter-Action of Washington DC. Inter-Action is an NGO consortium comprising 160 non governmental organisations.

In coordination with the "1000 Peace women across the globe" movement, she was nominated for a collective Nobel Peace Prize in 2005.

== Personal life ==
Dharmadasa lives in Kandy. She is a Buddhist. She is married to an Indian. She has two other sons apart from the one missing in action, one of whom still serves with the army.
