= Unimix =

CSB / UNIMIX
Nutritional value per 100 g (3.5 oz)
- Energy: 1,590 kJ (380 kcal)
- Carbohydrates: 60 g
- Fat: 6 g
- Protein: 18 g
Vitamins and minerals
Vitamins	Quantity %DV^{†}
Vitamin A	1700 IU
Thiamine (B1)	58% 0.7 mg
Riboflavin (B2)	38% 0.5 mg
Niacin (B3)	56% 9 mg
Pantothenic acid (B5)	60% 3 mg
Vitamin B6	41% 0.7 mg
Folate (B9)	50% 200 μg
Vitamin B12	167% 4 μg
Vitamin D	25% 200 IU
Vitamin E	36% 8 IU
Minerals	Quantity %DV^{†}
Calcium	62% 800 mg
Iron	100% 18 mg
Magnesium	24% 100 mg
Phosphorus	48% 600 mg
Potassium	23% 700 mg
Sodium	13% 300 mg
Zinc	27% 3 mg
- Other constituents: Quantity
- Ascorbic acid: 40 mg
- Iodine: 50 μg

Unimix is an enriched maize and bean flour designed and used to fight malnutrition. It contains maize (corn) flour, soy beans, oil, milk powder, and sugar; plus vitamins and minerals. The standard use is to make into porridge by cooking it with water and having this in addition to whatever other food is available. It can also be used in place of flour to make bread or other foods according to local customs. Humanitarian organizations ship Unimix in large quantities to starving people in order to fight severe malnutrition, especially in children, who need substantial protein to grow.

For example, in the Niger Food Crisis in 2005, 206 tons of Unimix were delivered to Niger, along with 34.5 tons of therapeutic milk and 2.6 tons of locally-purchased therapeutic food.

== See also ==
- RUTF
