= Surendra Pandey =

Nepalese politician

- सुरेन्द्र पाण्डे

Vice Chairman of Communist Party of Nepal (Unified Marxist–Leninist)
- Incumbent
- Assumed office 8 March 2021
- President: K. P. Sharma Oli

Minister of Finance
- In office 23 May 2009 – 6 February 2011
- President: Ram Baran Yadav
- Prime Minister: Madhav Kumar Nepal

Member of Parliament, Pratinidhi Sabha
- In office 4 March 2018 – 18 September 2022
- Preceded by: Himself (as Member of the Constituent Assembly)
- Succeeded by: Hari Dhakal
- Constituency: Chitwan 1

Member of the Constituent Assembly
- In office 21 January 2014 – 14 October 2017
- Preceded by: Lalmani Chaudhary
- Succeeded by: Himself (as Member of Parliament)
- Constituency: Chitwan 1

Personal details
- Born: August 25, 1963 (age 62) Gajuri–8, Dhading
- Party: Communist Party of Nepal (Unified Marxist–Leninist)
- Spouse: Purna Shova Chitrakar
- Parents: Netra Raj Pandey; Man Maya Pandey

Surendra Prasad Pandey (born 25 August 1958) is a Nepalese politician who is currently the vice chairman of Communist Party of Nepal (Unified Marxist–Leninist). He also served as the Chairman of Nepal-Japan Friendship Parliamentary Association from 2017 to 2023 and as the Minister of Finance from 2009 to 2011. He was a member of the 2nd Nepalese Constituent Assembly. He won the Chitwan–1 seat in 2013 Nepalese Constituent Assembly election from the Communist Party of Nepal (Unified Marxist–Leninist).

== Personal life ==
A CPN-UML’s vice chairman and former finance minister, Pandey was born on August 25, 1958, in Gajuri-8 of Dhading to parents of Netra Raj and Man Maya Pandey and grew up in Chitwan district. When he was of small age, his family moved from Dhading district and settled to Chitwan district. He was born to a brahmin family.

== Political career ==
Pandey was elected to the National Council in 1999, was the CA member in the first Constituent Assembly Election of 2008 from proportional representation. He was also the finance minister in the Madhav Kumar Nepal-led government. Pandey then said his budget would focus on job creation, boosting law and order, creating a better investment climate and implementing power projects to end a crippling shortage of electricity that has stunted economic growth. Pandey is specially known within CPN-UML for his contributions towards assisting the party in developing economic reform plans. His economic development ideologies have appeared in numerous platforms putting him in the forefront of CPN-UML's economic policy planners.

Pandey's term at the Nepal Government as the Finance Minister was considered very successful thus thwarting initial skepticism. Thus CIAA's charges against Pandey on 4 December 2015 was understood as a personal grudge. It was believed that the then CIAA Chief Lok Man Singh Karki was furious over Pandey's position against CIAA's unconstitutional jurisdictional overstepping and thus pressed charges against Pandey as a show of power. Lok Man Singh Karki was later sacked in 21 October 2016 as he was proven under-qualified for the appointment to the office of the chief of the Commission for Investigation of Abuse of Authority.
