= University of Jember =

University

Coordinates: 8.164667°S 113.717056°E

Jember University
- Universitas Jember
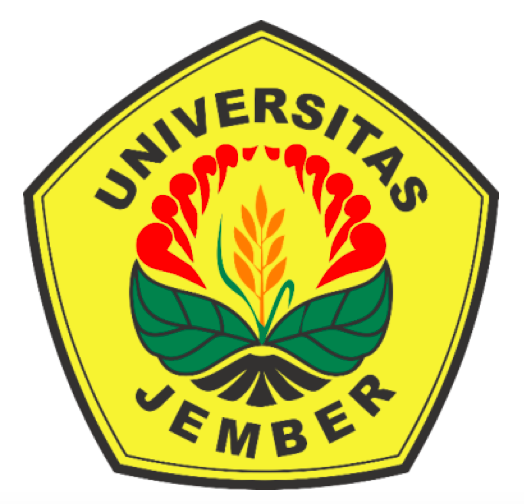
- Motto: Karya Rinaras Ambuka Budi, Gapura Mangesti Aruming Bawana
- Type: Public
- Established: 10 November 1964
- Rector: Dr. Ir. Iwan Taruna, M.Eng, IPM
- Location: Jember, East Java, Indonesia
- Colours: Navy blue
- Website: www.unej.ac.id

Jember University (abbreviated as UNEJ, Indonesian: Universitas Jember) is a university in the southeast of East Java, Indonesia, with four campuses in Jember town, Bondowoso, Lumajang and Pasuruan. This university is headquartered on Kalimantan Street No. 37, Jember, East Java. It has 18 faculties and programmes, including education and law, and according to World University rankings (2026) it had 39,050 students taking both undergraduate and postgraduate courses, and 1,224 staff. It was established on 10 November, 1964; formerly rated as a polytechnic university, it was subsequently upgraded to full university status.

Dr. Ir. Iwan Taruna, M.Eng, IPM is appointed as the University's Rector.

== Faculty ==
1. Faculty of Agriculture
2. Faculty of Agricultural Technology
3. Faculty of Dentistry
4. Faculty of Economics and Business
5. Faculty of Engineering
6. Faculty of Law
7. Faculty of Letters
8. Faculty of Mathematics and Natural Sciences
9. Faculty of Medicine
10. Faculty of Pharmacy
11. Faculty of Public Health
12. Faculty of Social and Political Sciences
13. Faculty of Teacher Training and Educational Science

== Alumni ==
- Gatot Sudjito
- Adek Berry
- Charles Meikyansah
