= Khairahani =

Municipality in Bagmati Province, Nepal

Khairahani Municipality खैरहनी नगरपालिका [खै.न.पा.]
- Municipality
- Khairahani Municipality
- Nickname: Khairahani
- Location in Nepal Khairahani Municipality (Nepal)
- Coordinates: 27.571°N 84.571°E
- Country: Nepal
- Province: Bagmati
- District: Chitwan

Government
  - Mayor: Sashi Kumar Khaniya (NC)
  - Deputy Mayor: Kabita Upreti (कविता उप्रेती) (CPN-UML)

Population (2011)
  - Total: 56,925
- Time zone: UTC+5:45 (NST)
- Postal code: 44203
- Area code: 056
- Website: www.khairhanimun.gov.np

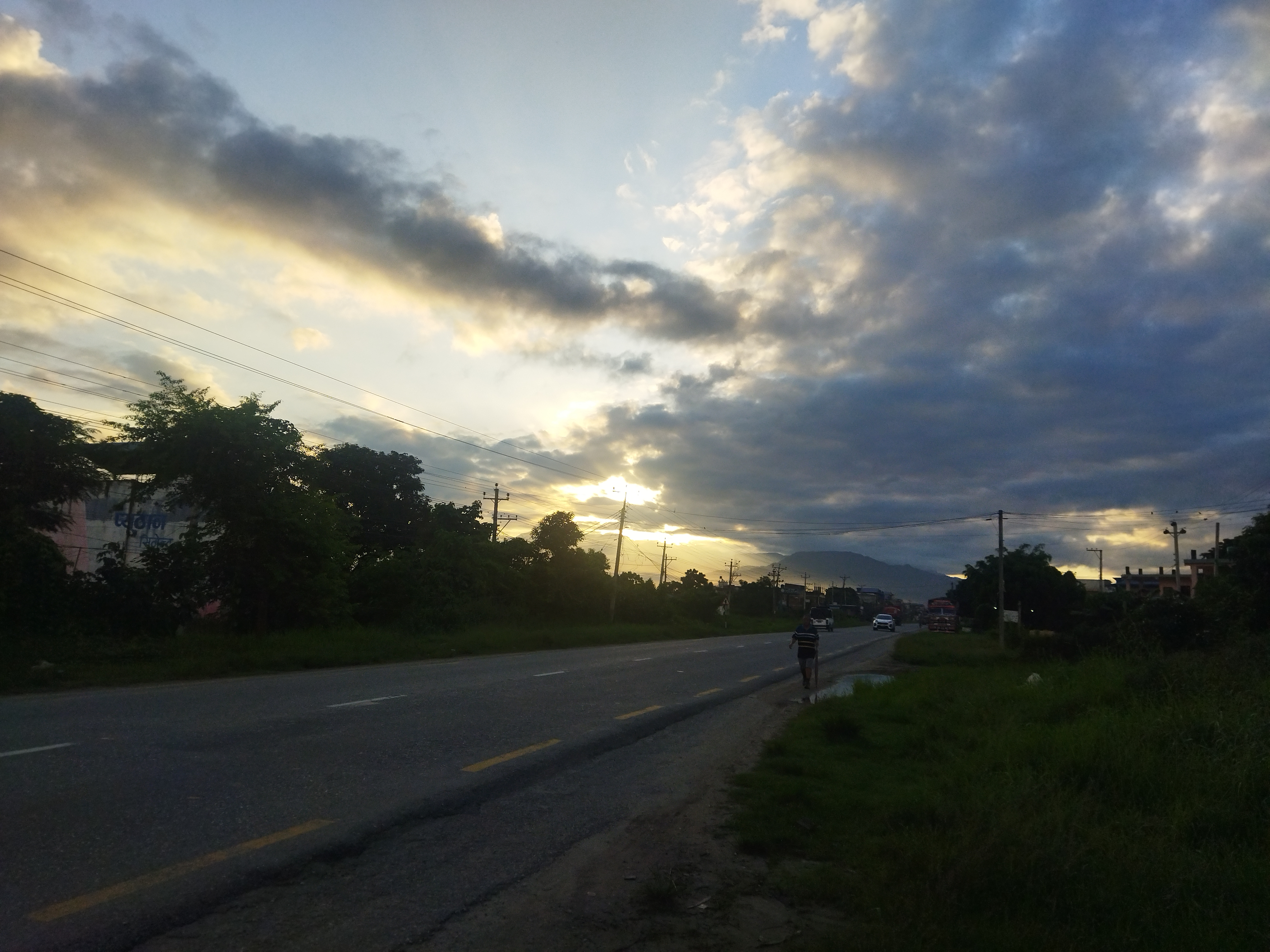
A view of the Mahendra Highway (East-West Highway) during sunrise in Khairahani, Eastern Chitwan.

Khairahani is a municipality in the Chitwan District of Bagmati Province, southern Nepal. The municipality was established on 8 May 2014 by merging the former Village Development Committees (VDCs) of Khairahani, Kumroj, and Chainpur.

According to the 2011 Nepal census, Khairahani Municipality had a population of 56,925 people.

== Demographics ==
At the time of the 2011 Nepal census, Khairahani Municipality had a population of 56,925.

=== Language ===
The most commonly spoken first languages were:

- Nepali – 60.2%
- Tharu – 25.8%
- Darai – 4.9%
- Tamang – 2.7%
- Bhojpuri – 2.1%
- Magar – 1.0%
- Newar – 0.9%
- Gurung – 0.7%
- Maithili – 0.6%
- Hindi – 0.4%
- Chepang – 0.3%
- Bote – 0.2%
- Kham – 0.1%
- Urdu – 0.1%
- Other languages – 0.1%

=== Ethnicity/Caste ===
The ethnic or caste composition was:

- Tharu – 27.1%
- Hill Brahmin – 25.7%
- Chhetri – 14.1%
- Darai – 5.2%
- Magar – 4.3%
- Tamang – 4.3%
- Newar – 4.0%
- Kami – 3.0%
- Gurung – 2.8%
- Damai/Dholi – 1.7%
- Musalman – 1.2%
- Kanu – 0.6%
- Bote – 0.5%
- Chepang/Praja – 0.5%
- Sanyasi/Dasnami – 0.5%
- Sarki – 0.5%
- Gharti/Bhujel – 0.4%
- Gaine – 0.3%
- Kumal – 0.3%
- Thakuri – 0.3%
- Dusadh/Paswan/Pasi – 0.2%
- Majhi – 0.2%
- Musahar – 0.2%
- Rai – 0.2%
- Teli – 0.2%
- Chamar/Harijan/Ram – 0.1%
- Ghale – 0.1%
- Hajam/Thakur – 0.1%
- Halwai – 0.1%
- Kalwar – 0.1%
- Kathabaniyan – 0.1%
- Koiri/Kushwaha – 0.1%
- Mallaha – 0.1%
- Other Terai – 0.1%
- Yadav – 0.1%
- Others – 0.1%

=== Religion ===
Religious affiliations were as follows:

- Hindu – 89.7%
- Buddhist – 6.1%
- Christian – 2.5%
- Muslim – 1.2%
- Prakriti – 0.1%
- Others – 0.4%

== Ward Profile ==
Presidents of Wards

- Ward No. 1: Navaraj Bhusal (NC)
- Ward No. 2: Rohini Prasad Upreti (NC)
- Ward No. 3: Purna Bahadur Gurung (NC)
- Ward No. 4: Ved Bahadur Adhikari (CPN-UML)
- Ward No. 5: Chhatra Nath Subedi (CPN-UML)
- Ward No. 6: Kamal Prasad Neupane (CPN-UML)
- Ward No. 7: Maneger Mahato (CPN-UML)
- Ward No. 8: Shankar Kandel (NC)
- Ward No. 9: Bandhu Ram Mahato (CPN-UML)
- Ward No. 10: Chandra Vikram Chaudhary (NC)
- Ward No. 11: Dipendra Kumar Darai (CPN-UML)
- Ward No. 12: Kedar Nath Pant (NC)
- Ward No. 13: Kul Prasad Bhusal (CPN-UML)
