= List of Pakistani peace laureates =

This is a list of Pakistani individuals and organizations who achieved international awards in recognition of their projects or social services for peace, human rights, education, health, public welfare and youth development, etc.

== World's highest ranking peace prizes ==
Title of Award	Winner	Portrait	Year	Achievements
Nobel Prize in Physics	Abdus Salam		1979	Dr. Abdus Salam was a Pakistani theoretical physicist who received Nobel Peace Prize for his contribution to the electroweak unification theory. He was the first Pakistani to receive this award.
Nobel Peace Prize	Malala Yousafzai		2014	Awarded jointly to Kailash Satyarthi and Malala Yousafzai – "for their struggle against the suppression of children and young people and for the right of all children to education.
Ramon Magsaysay Award	Akhtar Hameed Khan		1963	Akhter Hameed Khan was a Pakistani and social scientist. His particular contribution was the establishment of a comprehensive project for rural development, the Comilla Model (1959).
Ramon Magsaysay Award	Abdul Sattar Edhi		1986	Abdul Sattar Edhi was a Pakistani philanthropist, ascetic, and humanitarian who founded the Edhi Foundation, which runs the world's largest volunteer ambulance network, along with homeless shelters, animal shelter, rehab centers, and orphanages across Pakistan.
Ramon Magsaysay Award	Bilquis Edhi		1986	Bilquis Edhi (widow of Abdul Sattar Edhi) is a professional nurse and one of the most active philanthropists in Pakistan. She has been named The Mother of Pakistan.
Ramon Magsaysay Award	Shoaib Sultan Khan		1992	Shoaib Sultan Khan is one of the pioneers of rural development programmes in Pakistan. Since his retirement, he has been involved with the Rural Support Programmes (RSPs) of Pakistan full-time, on voluntary basis. Now, Rural Support Programmes have helped form 297,000 community organizations in 110 districts including two Federally Administered Tribal Areas of Pakistan.
Ramon Magsaysay Award	Asma Jahangir		1995	Asma Jahangir received Ramon Magsaysay Award on her struggle to prevent the persecution and exploitation of religious minorities, women and children in 1995.
Ramon Magsaysay Award	Adeebul Hasan Rizvi		1998	Adeebul Hasan Rizvi is a Pakistani philanthropist, doctor, and Renal transplant surgeon. He founded Sindh Institute of Urology and Transplantation (SIUT), the center of excellence for kidney transplant in Pakistan.
Ramon Magsaysay Award	Tasneem Ahmed Siddiqui		1999	Tasneem Ahmed Siddiqui was a social activist who led the Sindh Katchi Abadi Authority (SKAA), a quasi-government agency that regularized and upgrades squatter settlements, to begin solving the housing problem of the poor.
Ramon Magsaysay Award	Ruth Pfau		2002	Ruth Katherina Martha Pfau was a German–Pakistani Catholic nun of the Society of the Daughters of the Heart of Mary and a physician. She moved from Germany to Pakistan in 1961 and devoted more than 55 years of her life to fighting leprosy in Pakistan. She received Ramon Magsaysay Award on her life-long services and contributions in 2002.
Ramon Magsaysay Award	Ibn Abdur Rehman		2004	Ibn Abdur Rehman, also known as I. A. Rehman, was a Pakistani peace and human-rights advocate and a veteran communist. He has been influential for promoting peace in the Indo-Pakistani wars and conflicts and in Kashmir conflict as well as for other human rights issues in Pakistan.
Ramon Magsaysay Award	The Citizens Foundation		2014	A nonprofit organization based in Pakistan, The Citizens Foundation is providing education to the less-fortunate and underprevileged people through their branch network all over Pakistan. They received Ramon Magsaysay Award in 2014 on their humanitarian services and continuous efforts.
Ramon Magsaysay Award	Amjad Saqib		2021	Amjad Saqib, founder and Executive Director of Akhuwat Foundation received The Ramon Magsaysay Award 2021 for his first-of-its-kind microfinance loan programme (collateral free loan with zero percent interest) which has helped millions of poor and deserving families in Pakistan.
Gusi Peace Prize	Dr. Mirza Ikhtiar Baig		2018	Dr. Mirza Ikhtiar Baig (Honorary Consul General of Republic of Yemen in Pakistan) served as Secretary General of Make-A-Wish Foundation in Pakistan, granting wishes of terminally ill children. He received Gusi Peace Prize in 2018.
Gusi Peace Prize	Farhan Wilayat Butt		2019	A Lahore-based Pakistani humanitarian, Farhan Wilayat Butt achieved Gusi Peace Prize 2019 on his philanthropic activities for arrangement of clean drinking water in desert areas of Pakistan under Singh Water Relief Project.
Lenin Peace Prize	Faiz Ahmad Faiz		1962	Lenin Peace Prize used to be the highest ranking award of Soviet Union and one of the most popular and prestigious peace awards of Asia. Faiz Ahmad Faiz (a Pakistani writer and poet who got popularity due to his intellect and revolutionary poetry) was the first-ever Pakistani to receive this award from Soviet Union in 1962.
Lenin Peace Prize	Abdul Sattar Edhi		1988	In 1988, Abdul Sattar Edhi (a humanitarian from Pakistan) received Lenin Peace Prize from Soviet Union for his services in the 1988 Armenian earthquake. The award got discontinued in 1991 after dissolution of the Soviet Union.
Paul Bartlett Ré Peace Prize	Farhan Wilayat Butt		2022	Paul Bartlett Ré Peace Prize (a bi-annual peace award and cash prize) is given by University of New Mexico to an individual who has demonstrated notable achievements in promoting world peace and understanding. Being the first Pakistani nominee, Farhan Wilayat Butt achieved Paul Bartlett Ré Peace Prize 2022 for the Sindh Water Relief Project under the category of Lifetime Achievement Winner.

== United Nations prize and special recognition ==
Title of Award	Winner	Portrait	Year	Achievements
United Nations Prize in the Field of Human Rights	Ra'ana Liaquat Ali Khan		1978	Ra'ana Liaquat Ali Khan made countless contributions in South Asian region in the fields of politics, peace and human rights; as she was a prominent lady of British India who performed a vital role in Pakistan Movement. She was spouse of Liaquat Ali Khan (the first Prime Minister of Pakistan). United Nations awarded her with United Nations Prize in the Field of Human Rights for her contributions in 1978.
United Nations Prize in the Field of Human Rights	Benazir Bhutto		2008	United Nations Prize in the Field of Human Rights is issued after a gap of every five years. It was awarded to Benazir Bhutto, former Prime Minister of Pakistan (1st term 1988–1990, 2nd term 1993–1996) in 2008 on a posthumous basis a year after her murder at an election rally in Islamabad, Pakistan, in December 2007.
United Nations Prize in the Field of Human Rights	Malala Yousafzai		2013	After a scheduled gap of 5 years (from 2008 – after issuance of award in favour of former Pakistani prime minister, Benazir Bhutto), United Nations Prize in the Field of Human Rights was again issued in favour of a Pakistani activist, Malala Yousafzai in 2013. She received this award on her advocacy of equal women's rights for education and freedom to join schools in Pakistan.
UNESCO-Madanjeet Singh Prize	Joint Action Committee for People's Rights		1998	Joint Action Committee for People's Rights (JAC) is actually an alliance/coalition of various nonprofit organizations and non-governmental organizations in Karachi, Pakistan. For their services to civil society, United Nations awarded them with UNESCO-Madanjeet Singh Prize in 1998.
UNESCO-Madanjeet Singh Prize	Abdul Sattar Edhi		2009	Abdul Sattar Edhi was the second recipient of UNESCO-Madanjeet Singh Prize from Pakistan. He received this award for his contributions in the field of peace and public welfare.
Avicenna Prize	Faiz Ahmad Faiz		2006	Avicenna Prize was posthumously given to Faiz Ahmad Faiz (a Pakistani poet, and author of Urdu and Punjabi literature) in 2006. Avicenna Prize, named after the 11th century Persian physician and philosopher Avicenna (980–1038), is awarded every two years by UNESCO.
Avicenna Prize	Zabta Khan Shinwari		2015	Zabta Khan Shinwari (a Pakistani botanist and researcher from Kohat, Khyber Pakhtunkhwa) received Avicenna Prize in 2015. He was designated the laureate of the Prize by Irina Bokova, Director-General of UNESCO, upon the recommendation of an independent International Jury of scholars and ethicists.
Nansen Refugee Award	Syed Munir Husain		1988	Nansen Refugee Award is given by United Nations High Commissioner for Refugees to the individuals or organizations who work for social cause of refugees or stateless people. Syed Munir Husain (former Chairman of the Agriculture Development Bank of Pakistan) was the first Pakistani to receive this award in year 1988.
Nansen Refugee Award	Aqeela Asifi		2015	Aqeela Asifi is an Afghan-Pakistani woman (an Afghan woman who later on took refuge in Pakistan in 1992). She was a teacher by profession. On her social services for education of refugees in Pakistan, she was awarded with Nansen Refugee Award in 2015.
Millennium Peace Prize for Women	Asma Jahangir		2001	Asma Jahangir was awarded the Millennium Peace Prize for Women in 2001 by United Nations Development Fund for Women (UNIFEM).
Millennium Peace Prize for Women	Hina Jilani		2001	Hina Jilani was awarded the Millennium Peace Prize for Women by United Nations Development Fund for Women (UNIFEM) in 2001.
N-Peace Awards	Shah Zaman		2014	Raised from Gilgit-Baltistan (the northern regions of Pakistan; Shah Zaman is working on peace and human rights for last many years. He established a nonprofit organization in a young age and commenced educational projects to educate the youth of Gilgit-Baltistan. He received N-Peace Awards on his services in 2014.
N-Peace Awards	Rabiah Jamil Beg		2014	Rabiah Jamil Beg is a Pakistani journalist who mostly covers serious issues pertaining to humanitarian crises in various parts of the country. She got nominated for N-Peace Awards for being a brave female journalist and crime reporter. She received the award in 2014.
N-Peace Awards	Mona Parkash		2014	Mona Parkash is a social activist from Hyderabad (Pakistan) who achieved N-Peace Awards for her contributions to educate children in Tando Allahyar (Sindh) in 2014.
N-Peace Awards	Rubina Feroze Bhatti		2015	Dr. Rubina Feroze Bhatti is an educationalist and human rights activist from Pakistan. She actually belongs to a Christian family and therefore she works for the rights of Minorities in Pakistan. She received N-Peace Awards on her services in 2015.
N-Peace Awards	Aliya Harir		2015	Aliya Harir is a Pakistani peace activist who commenced special projects for peaceful relations between Pakistan and India. She initiated Aaghaz-e-Dosti in 2012 to remove misunderstandings and misconceptions between the general public of both countries. She received N-Peace Awards on her contributions for a peaceful environment in Pakistan in 2015.
N-Peace Awards	Mossarat Qadeem		2016	Mossarat Qadeem is known for her welfare activities for socio-political and economic empowerment of marginalized communities in Pakistan. She raises her voice for the rights of women, peace and security in Pakistan. She received N-Peace Awards for her services for women's rights and peace in the country in 2016.
N-Peace Awards	Rizwana Shah		2016	Rizwana Shah is a successful entrepreneur from Pakistan who initially established a very small sewing setup to financially assist her family. Later on, she enhanced the setup and started hiring more deserving women in her area. She empowered a huge number of women of backward areas. She received N-Peace Awards in 2016 on her humanitarian services.
N-Peace Awards	Farhat Asif		2017	Farhat Asif is a social activist for peace-building from Azad Jammu and Kashmir (a semi-independent state under control of Pakistan). She has an extensive for development of peace and understanding between different departments, agencies and offices. For her contributions, she received N-Peace Awards in 2017.
N-Peace Awards	Farhat Sajjad		2017	Farhat Sajjad dedicated her life for development and empowerment of women in Gilgit-Baltistan. She established a community centre to offer education and training opportunities to the local women of Gilgit-Baltistan. For her contributions, she received N-Peace Awards in 2017.
N-Peace Awards	Mahira Miyanji		2018	Mahira Miyanji established special projects for women's education in Karachi (Pakistan). She commenced an educational setup (non-profit organization) to educate the girls of Lyari (an area in Karachi, highly populated with less-fortunate and underprivileged people). She received N-Peace Awards 2018 for her services to educate thousands of girls in Lyari and other areas of Karachi.
N-Peace Awards	Meena Baber		2019	Meena Baber is working on women's rights and gender equality for last many years. She established various special projects and initiatives for women empowerment in Federally Administered Tribal Areas. She achieved N-Peace Awards 2019 on her services on behalf of women in Pakistan.
UNESCO/Bilbao Prize for the Promotion of a Culture of Human Rights	Asma Jahangir		2010	Asma Jahangir received UNESCO/Bilbao Prize for the Promotion of a Culture of Human Rights in 2010.
Dag Hammarskjöld Medal	Naik Muhammad Naeem Raza		2019	Naik Muhammad Naeem Raza was a Pakistani soldier who joined United Nations peacekeeping for a special mission in Democratic Republic of Congo. During his peacekeeping services, he was martyred in 2018. Later on (after a year of his death), United Nations awarded him with Dag Hammarskjöld Medal on the occasion of International Day of United Nations Peacekeepers 2019. That award was received by Pakistani representative to the United Nations on his behalf.
Dag Hammarskjöld Medal	Sepoy Amir Aslam		2020	Sepoy Amir Aslam was a Pakistani soldier who was appointed and later on martyred in Democratic Republic of Congo under United Nations peacekeeping mission. He was awarded Dag Hammarskjöld Medal by UN Secretary General on posthumously basis in a virtual ceremony in May 2020. (Actual grand ceremony was not held due to COVID-19 pandemic).
International Female Police Peacekeeper Award	Shahzadi Gulfam		2011	Shahzadi Gulfam (an officer of United Nations Police) from Pakistan has a longest profile as a peacekeeper working under United Nations peacekeeping mission in different locations including Bosnia and Herzegovina, Kosovo and East Timor. She is the first Pakistani woman who received "International Female Police Peacekeeper Award" from United Nations in 2011 on her performance.
United Nations Medal	Pakistani Female Engagement Team (FET)		2020	First time in the history, Pakistani Female Engagement Team (a peacekeeping team based on 15 female members) joined a special stabilization mission of United Nations in Democratic Republic of Congo. UN awarded the team with United Nations Medal at South Kivu in 2020.
United Nations Prize in the Field of Human Rights	Asma Jahangir		2018	United Nations Prize in the Field of Human Rights was awarded to Asma Jahangir posthumously for her contributions to promote and protect human rights in Pakistan.
World Habitat Award	Aga Khan Agency for Habitat		2020	Aga Khan Agency for Habitat, Pakistan (AKAH Pakistan), a welfare project that helped more than one-million people to build climate-proof settlements in disaster-prone areas of Pakistan won World Habitat Award from UN-Habitat (United Nations Human Settlements Programme) in December 2020.

== International merit awards (government based) ==
Title of Award	Winner	Portrait	Year	Achievements
Order of the Renaissance	Imran Khan		2019	Imran Khan (former cricketer, chairman of Pakistan Tehreek-e-Insaf, founder of Shaukat Khanum Memorial Cancer Hospital and Research Centre and former Prime Minister of Pakistan) received Order of the Renaissance from King Hamad bin Isa Al-Khalifa at the Sakhir Palace in 2019 on his outstanding services in the fields of sports, politics, and philanthropy. Order of the Renaissance is considered as the third highest civilian award of Kingdom of Bahrain.
Premi Internacional Catalunya	Malala Yousafzai		2013	Premi Internacional Catalunya is the highest-ranking official award of Catalonia which is given to the individuals who fight for human rights with courage and bravery. In 2013, Gro Harlem Brundtland from Norway and Malala Yousafzai from Pakistan received "Premi Internacional Catalunya Award" on their work for human rights and development.
ISA Award for Services to Humanity	Edhi Foundation		2019	ISA Award for Services to Humanity was established by Hamad bin Isa Al Khalifa (King of Bahrain) as an official award granted by the Kingdom of Bahrain along with monetary prize. In 2019, Edhi Foundation from Pakistan received ISA Award for Services to Humanity along with a cash prize, equivalent to 1 Million US Dollars for their local and international welfare programmes.
Diamond Award	Ansar Burney		2012	Ansar Burney (a Pakistani human rights activist/ civil rights activist received Diamond Award from Cheryl Gillan (Secretary of State for Wales & Member of Parliament) in 2012 on the occasion of Diamond Jubilee of Elizabeth II. He received this award on his philanthropic services around the world.
Kentucky Colonel Commission	Farhan Wilayat Butt		2020	Farhan Wilayat Butt (a Pakistani philanthropist) received Kentucky Colonel Commission from Andy Beshear (the Governor of Kentucky) in 2020. Kentucky Colonel Commission is the highest title of honor bestowed by the Commonwealth of Kentucky, and is the most well-known of a number of honorary colonelcies conferred by United States governors.
Order of the Indian Empire	Shahbaz Khan Bugti		1901	Shahbaz Khan Bugti (a Chief of Bugti Tribe in Balochistan) was knighted as a Knight Commander of the Order of the Indian Empire (KCIE) in November 1901 for fighting for the British Colonial Government of India and for his service to the British colonials.
Order of the Indian Empire	Jahan Zeb of Swat		1946	Miangul Jahan Zeb, the Wāli of Swat (the ruler of former Princely State of Swat, now a part of Pakistan) received the highest honour of Order of the Indian Empire (an order of chivalry founded by Queen Victoria) in 1946. He is remembered for building schools, hospitals, and roads, but also for his absolute rule over the region, which ended in 1969.
King Faisal Prize	Abul A'la Maududi		1979	King Faisal Prize is the highest ranking award of Saudi Arabia which is given under five categories, including Service to Islam; Islamic studies; the Arabic language and Arabic literature; science; and medicine. This reward includes a gold medal and a cash award of US$200,000.00 (US Dollars Two Hundred Thousand only). Abul A'la Maududi a Muslim philosopher and scholar from Pakistan received this award on his notable work (i.e. translation of the Quran in Urdu and various other Asian languages).
King Faisal Prize	Khurshid Ahmad (scholar)		1990	Khurshid Ahmad (scholar) is a Pakistani politician and an Islamic activist who developed Islamic economic jurisprudence as an academic discipline. Keeping in view his services, King Faisal Foundation of Saudi Arabia awarded him with King Faisal Prize in 1990.
Tipperary International Peace Award	Benazir Bhutto		2007	Tipperary International Peace Award is an official award issued by Tipperary (town) (a town located in Republic of Ireland) specifically for the humanitarians by Tipperary Peace Convention. It was posthumously awarded to Benazir Bhutto, former Prime Minister of Pakistan (1st Term from 1988 to 1990 & 2nd Term 1993–1996) who was murdered at an election rally in Islamabad, Pakistan in December 2007.
Tipperary International Peace Award	Malala Yousafzai		2012	Malala Yousafzai was being awarded the Tipperary International Peace Award in 2012 for her work in support of female education in Khyber Pakhtunkhwa, Pakistan.
Sheikh Hamdan bin Rashid Al Maktoum Award for Medical Sciences	Abdul Sattar Edhi		2000	Sheikh Hamdan bin Rashid Al Maktoum Award for Medical Sciences is one of the official awards of United Arab Emirates which was established by Maktoum bin Rashid Al Maktoum (former Prime Minister). The first term (1999–2000) of this award under the category of Volunteers in Humanitarian Medical Services was awarded to Abdul Sattar Edhi in 2000.
Sheikh Hamdan bin Rashid Al Maktoum Award for Medical Sciences	Adeebul Hasan Rizvi		2004	Third term (2003–2004) of Sheikh Hamdan bin Rashid Al Maktoum Award for Medical Sciences under the category of Volunteers in Humanitarian Medical Services was awarded to Adeebul Hasan Rizvi in 2004.
Sakharov Prize	Malala Yousafzai		2013	Sakharov Prize is presented by European Parliament to those individuals who dedicate their lives for basic human rights. It is one of the highest ranking human rights award given by European Parliament with a monetary prize. Malala Yousafzai from Pakistan received this award in 2013 along with a cash prize of 50,000 euros.
Prince Claus Award	Madeeha Gauhar		2006	Madeeha Gauhar (an activist of women's rights from Pakistan) was honored with Prince Claus Award from Netherlands in 2006 for her contributions to highlight various social issues associated with human rights and women's rights in South Asia through the medium of theatre arts.
Order of Merit of the Italian Republic	Jahan Zeb of Swat		1963	Miangul Jahan Zeb, the Wāli of Swat received Order of Merit of the Italian Republic (a senior Italian order of merit) in 1963.
Order of Merit of the Italian Republic	Ra'ana Liaquat Ali Khan		1966	Liaquat Ali Khan is the only Pakistani woman who received the Order of Merit of the Italian Republic in 1966. This award is one of the highest official awards bestowed by President of Italy to the individuals who have contributed their efforts in the field of art, literature, peace and philanthropy.
Order of Merit of the Federal Republic of Germany	Ruth Pfau		1968	Dr. Ruth Pfau was awarded the Order of Merit of the Federal Republic of Germany for her selfless efforts for the treatment and control of leprosy in Pakistan.
Ellis Island Medal of Honor	Malala Yousafzai		2017	Ellis Island Medal of Honor is the highest official award of Ellis Island which is given to native and naturalized citizens of United States. This medal was presented to Malala Yousafzai by Ellis Island Honors Society in 2017.
Staufer Medal	Ruth Pfau		2015	Dr. Ruth Pfau was awarded the Staufer Medal (the highest ranking award of the German state of Baden-Württemberg) for her medical and humanitarian work in 2015. Dr. Ruth Pfau was the founder of National Leprosy Control Programme in Pakistan. She dedicated her entire life for eradication of leprosy in Pakistan.
Order of Orange-Nassau	Ra'ana Liaquat Ali Khan		1961	Order of Orange-Nassau is a civil and military Dutch order of chivalry which is given to the outstanding individuals who serve the society. Ra'ana Liaquat Ali Khan received this award in 1961.
Order of Orange-Nassau	Princess Sarvath al-Hassan		2013	Princess Sarvath al-Hassan, a Pakistani-origin Jordanian royal and the wife of Prince Hassan bin Talal of Jordan received Order of Orange-Nassau in 2013.
Philadelphia Liberty Medal	Malala Yousafzai		2014	Philadelphia Liberty Medal is presented by The Philadelphia Foundation established by National Constitution Center, (United States). This award was given to Malala Yousafzai in 2014. She received this award for her courage to stood against violence created by Taliban and for awareness to re-open girls schools in Swat.
Order of Merit (Yemen)	Dr. Mirza Ikhtiar Baig		2014	President of Republic of Yemen awarded Dr. Mirza Ikhtiar Baig (Honorary Consul General of Republic of Yemen in Pakistan) with Order of Merit (national award of Yemen) for his services and contributions to build friendly relations between Pakistan and Yemen and to increase trade and investment opportunities between both countries.
Albert Schweitzer Gesellschaft Award	Ruth Pfau		1991	Dr. Ruth Pfau received Albert Schweitzer Gesellschaft Award from the Government of Austria for her selfless efforts for the treatment and control of leprosy in Pakistan.
North–South Prize	Mukhtar Mai		2007	North–South Prize is a yearly award which is given by "European Centre for Global Interdependence and Solidarity" (popularly known as North–South Centre being run under the agreement of Council of Europe) to the individuals on their outstanding performance in the field of human rights. In April 2007, Mukhtaran Mai from Muzaffargarh District of Pakistan won this award for her efforts and contributions. She was a victim of gang rape who later on filed the case in Anti Terrorism Court of Pakistan and sued the rapists. The case got international coverage and the court sentenced death punishment to the rapists .
North-South Prize	Asma Jahangir		2012	Asma Jahangir received North-South Prize of Council of Europe in 2012.
Pride of Britain Awards	Malala Yousafzai		2013	Pride of Britain Awards are given to the citizens of Great Britain who courageously face and handle the most challenging situations and unfavorable circumstances. This award was presented to Malala Yousafzai by David Beckham under category of "Teenager of Courage" for her work and efforts on peace and women's education in South Asia.

== International merit awards (private) ==
Title of Award	Winner	Portrait	Year	Achievements
Kuwait Prize	Hakeem Muhammad Saeed		1983	Hakeem Muhammad Saeed (a Pakistani medical researcher, scholar, philanthropist, founder of Hamdard Foundation and former governor of Sindh Province from 1993 until 1994) received Kuwait Prize for Tibb-i-Islami (Eastern medicine) in 1983. The prize amounts to KD 40,000 (forty thousand Kuwaiti Dinars) which is approximately equivalent to US$130,000 (one hundred thirty thousand US dollars), a gold medal, a KFAS shield and a certificate of recognition.
Damien-Dutton Award	Ruth Pfau		1991	Dr. Ruth Pfau received Damien-Dutton Award from Damien-Dutton Society of United States for her lifelong efforts and struggle for the treatment and control of leprosy in Pakistan in 1991.
Seoul Peace Prize	Abdul Sattar Edhi		2008	Seoul Peace Prize is one of the top ranking peace awards of South Korea. It is given by "Seoul Peace Prize Cultural Foundation" (located in Seoul) which is being run and controlled by hundreds of Korean peace activists. Abdul Sattar Edhi from Pakistan won this prize in 2008. Till date, he is the only Pakistani to achieve this award.
Rome Prize for Peace and Humanitarian Action	Malala Yousafzai		2012	Malala Yousafzai received 2012 edition of the Rome Prize for Peace and Humanitarian Action from the Mayor of Rome, Gianni Alemanno at a ceremony on December 20, 2012.
Marion Doenhoff-Prize	Ruth Pfau		2005	Dr. Ruth Pfau received Marion Doenhoff-Prize of Germany for her efforts and struggle for the treatment and control of leprosy in Pakistan in 2005.
Niwano Peace Prize	World Muslim Congress		1987	Niwano Peace Prize is given to various individuals who work for promotion of interfaith peace and harmony around the world and to reduce misunderstandings between people associated with different religions. In 1987, this award was given to World Muslim Congress (a Karachi based non-profit organization of Pakistan) on its contribution for making peace and understanding among religions. Abdullah Omar Nasseef (a Saudi chemist and geologist) is the chairman of World Muslim Congress.
The Wolf Award	Farhan Wilayat Butt		2021	Farhan Wilayat Butt (a Lahore-based philanthropist and peace activist) received The Wolf Award 2021 for raising his voice for the rights and protection of religious minorities in Pakistan in order to reduce religious extremism, racial intolerance and sectarian violence. The Wolf Award is a Canadian award which is given to individuals and organizations on their efforts and struggle to reduce and eliminate racial intolerance and to spread peace and harmony.
Humanitarian Award	Imran Khan		2007	Imran Khan (former cricketer, chairman of Pakistan Tehreek-e-Insaf, founder of Shaukat Khanum Memorial Cancer Hospital and Research Centre and former Prime Minister of Pakistan) received the Humanitarian Award in 2007 for his work setting up Shaukat Khanum Memorial Cancer Hospital and Research Centre, Lahore during the ceremony of Asian Sports Award in Malaysia. This hospital was established in 1994 as the first hospital of Pakistan with specialized cancer facility including diagnostic centre and therapeutic facilities.
Ginetta Sagan Award	Hina Jilani		2000	Hina Jilani, a Pakistani lawyer and human rights activist received Ginetta Sagan Award from Amnesty International in 2003.
Ten Outstanding Young Persons of the World	Ansar Burney		1991	Ansar Burney received the honour of Ten Outstanding Young Persons of the World in 1991 from Junior Chamber International (JCI) which is a Mexican non-profit and International non-governmental organization. This program recognizes young people around the globe who excel in their chosen fields (associated with and exemplify the best attributes of the world's young people.
BNP Paribas Grand Prize for Individual Philanthropy	Arif Naqvi		2015	Arif Naqvi, a Dubai-based Pakistani businessman and philanthropist, received BNP Paribas Grand Prize for Individual Philanthropy from BNP Paribas, France. Arif founded Aman Foundation (a not for profit trust, based in Karachi, Pakistan that works on solutions in health and education) in 2008. He established various projects including Aman Ghar, Aman Ambulance, Aman Community Health Program, SUKH Initiative, and Aman TeleHealth through Aman Foundation. BNP Paribas Grand Prize honors an individual or family for their overall philanthropic activity, commending the exemplary nature of their actions, their financial engagement, impact and long-term commitment.
Doughty Street Advocacy Award	Malala Yousafzai		2013	Malala Yousafzai received Doughty Street Advocacy Award (Index on Censorship Freedom of Expression Award) in 2013. The ceremony was hosted by Index's Chair Jonathan Dimbleby who dedicated the evening to, 'a celebration of freedom of expression – that fundamental human right to write, blog, tweet, speak out, protest and create art and literature and music'.
Martin Ennals Award for Human Rights Defenders	Asma Jahangir		1995	Asma Jahangir received Martin Ennals Award for Human Rights Defenders in 1995. This Switzerland-based award is an annual prize for human rights defenders.
Catalonia International Prize	Malala Yousafzai		2013	Malala Yousafzai received Premi Internacional Catalunya Award (Catalonia International Prize) in 2013. It is a Spanish international prize, awarded every year since 1989 by the Generalitat de Catalunya. The award recognizes the work of people who have not only contributed to the development of culture, science or economics, but have also stood out for having completed their work with a high ethical and humanistic commitment.
Pax Christi International Peace Award	Human Rights Commission of Pakistan		2016	Pax Christi International Peace Award is presented to the human rights defenders around the globe. It specially appreciates and encourages the activists who fight for the rights of religious minorities. In 2016, this award was given to Human Rights Commission of Pakistan in Geneva (Switzerland).
Pax Christi International Peace Award	National Commission for Justice and Peace		2016	In 2016, National Commission for Justice and Peace (NCJP) received Pax Christi International Peace Award in Geneva (Switzerland) in recognition of their services in the field of minority rights, especially in the cases of injustice, religious extremism and forced conversions.
Global Humanitarian Award	Fayeeza Naqvi		2016	In 2016, Fayeeza Naqvi received the inaugural Global Humanitarian Award for Women's and Children's Health from Bill & Melinda Gates Foundation in Indonesia. Fayeeza Naqvi is chairperson of Aman Foundation and she has been dedicating her time and efforts for improving the socioeconomic lives of underprivileged people of Pakistan. She received that award on her contributions (especially the family planning programmes being run under Aman Foundation in Pakistan).
Observer Ethical Awards	Malala Yousafzai		2013	Observer Ethical Awards is an annual award being presented by The Observer to the individuals who contribute their efforts for promotion of ethical living. Malala Yousafzai from Pakistan received the 2013 Observer Ethical Award for her women's rights work.
King Baudouin International Development Prize	Asma Jahangir		2000	Asma Jahangir received King Baudouin International Development Prize in 2000. It is given by King Baudouin Foundation (an independent and pluralistic foundation based in Brussels.
Award for Development of the OPEC Fund for International Development	Malala Yousafzai		2013	Malala Yousafzai received annual Award for Development of the OPEC Fund for International Development in June 2013. The OPEC Fund Award primarily supports outstanding young individuals from developing countries.
Fondation Chirac Peace Prize	Gulalai Ismail		2016	Gulalai Ismail is a human rights defender from Khyber Pakhtunkhwa province of Pakistan. Under the title of Aware Girls, she established a non-profit organization to address most serious issues pertaining to the life of women in Khyber Pakhtunkhwa including their education, employment, health and safety. She also started educating the Pashtun girls about their rights. In 2016, Gulalai's organisation Aware Girls was awarded the Fondation Chirac Peace Prize.
Reebok Human Rights Award	Iqbal Masih	A shy and afraid Iqbal Masih in picture	1994	Iqbal Masih was a young kid from a Pakistani Christian family. He was hired in a carpet factory as a child labour (debt slave child) in a very early age. After paying-off the debt in five years of day and night work; he started raising his voice for elimination of child labour and debt bondage of young child slaves in carpet factories. In 1994, he was invited to United States and received Reebok Human Rights Award along with a prize money of 12,000 US Dollars.
Shorty Awards	Malala Yousafzai		2015	Shorty Awards are internationally recognized as the highest awards given to the individuals and organizations on their short-time contents (videos and documentaries etc.) on social media, including Facebook, Twitter, YouTube, TikTok etc. The annual ceremony takes place in United States. This award was given to Malala Fund under category of Teen Hero in 2015.
Bremen Peace Award	Insan Dost Association		2013	Bremen Peace Award is presented by Schwelle Foundation (a German-based non-profit organization) to the individuals and organizations who work on peace and social justice. This award was given to "Insan Dost Association" (IDA) of Pakistan which is a non-profit organization that works for reduction and elimination of bonded labour in Pakistan. Anjum Raza (chairman) received this award on behalf of IDA in 2013.
The Green Apple Award	Farhan Wilayat Butt		2021	The Green Apple Award for Environmental Best Practices 2021 was presented to Farhan Wilayat Butt (a Pakistani humanitarian) on his welfare projects in the less-fortunate desert areas of Tharparkar for arrangement of clean drinking water to the locals. The Green Apple Awards were established in United Kingdom in 1994 for identifying professionals who demonstrate environmental best practices.
Peter Gomes Humanitarian Award	Malala Yousafzai		2013	Malala Yousafzai received Peter Gomes Humanitarian Award of Harvard Foundation (a project of Harvard University) in September 2013.
University of Oslo's Human Rights Award	Asma Jahangir		2002	Asma Jahangir received University of Oslo's Human Rights Award in 2002. This award is also called the "Lisl and Leo Eitinger Prize".
Clinton Global Citizen Award	The Citizens Foundation		2011	Clinton Global Citizen Award is presented by Clinton Foundation (a non-profit organization established by Bill Clinton, former president of United States). The Citizens Foundation received Clinton Global Citizen Award 2011 for their services to educated marginalized and underprivileged communities in Pakistan.
Clinton Global Citizen Award	Malala Yousafzai		2013	Malala Yousafzai received Clinton Global Citizen Award under the category of "Leadership in Civil Society" in 2013. Queen Rania of Jordan presented the award to Malala Yousafzai.
Clinton Global Citizen Award	Syeda Ghulam Fatima		2015	Syeda Ghulam Fatima is a labour-rights activist who is making efforts to eradicate bonded labour and child labour from Pakistan. She established a non-profit organization, named: Bonded Labour Liberation Front with a mission to raise voice for the rights of labour and daily wagers in Pakistan. Her contributions were globally acclaimed and she received Clinton Global Citizen Award in 2015.
GG2 Leadership Award	Malala Yousafzai		2013	Malala Yousafzai received GG2 Hammer Award at the grand ceremony of GG2 Leadership Awards in London (in November 2013). The GG2 Power 101 has been compiled by The Asian Media and Marketing Group (AMG) and features the top 101 most influential Asians in the UK, ranging from all walks of life.
GG2 Leadership Award	Kainat Riaz		2013	Kainat Riaz (a fellow school girl of Malala Yousafzai who also wounded in Taliban's shooting) also received GG2 Hammer Award in London (in November 2013).
GG2 Leadership Award	Shazia Ramzan		2013	Shazia Ramzan (another fellow school girl of Malala Yousafzai who also wounded in Taliban's shooting) also received GG2 Hammer Award in London (in November 2013).
World Sikh Award	Ramesh Singh Arora		2018	Ramesh Singh Arora is patron-in-chief of Pakistan Sikh Council, member of Prime Minister's Taskforce for Evacuee Trust Property Board and a social activist from Pakistan. He founded "MOJAZ Foundation" to help the deserving and homeless people in Badin and constructed more than 500 shelters under the philanthropic project. He was the first Pakistani Sikh to receive World Sikh Award (under the category of "Sikhs in Charity") on his contributions. The award ceremony took place in Toronto, Canada.
Japan Prize (NHK)	Muneeza Hashmi		2015	Japan Prize (NHK) is a Japanese award presented by NHK to encourage organizations and individuals who create awareness in people and positivism in society through educational videos, websites, online or television contents. Muneeza Hashmi (daughter of revered Pakistani poet, Faiz Ahmed Faiz and chairperson of Himmat Society of Pakistan) received this award in 2015 for her contributions in the field of educational media.
Four Freedoms Award	Asma Jahangir		2010	Asma Jahangir received Four Freedoms Award (under category: Freedom of Worship) in 2010 in a ceremony held in the Nieuwe Kerk in Middelburg, Holland.
Wonk of the Year Award	Malala Yousafzai		2017	Wonk of the Year Award is an initiative of American University that recognizes the contributions of an individual in his/ her relevant fields. This is an annual event and among hundreds of nomination a winner is chosen by a panel of judges. In 2017, American University awarded Malala Yousafzai with Wonk of the Year Award for her work on peace and education.
International Award UCLG	Farida Shaheed		2014	Farida Shaheed is an activist of women's rights and a sociologist by profession. She has also been working for promotion of cultural rights for United Nations. On November 12, 2014, Farida received the International Award UCLG – Mexico City Culture 21 for her work on gender, culture, peace, religion and the state. This award is presented by United Cities and Local Governments (UCLG) to the individuals for their contribution to culture as a pillar of sustainable development.
International Prize for Equality and Non-Discrimination	Malala Yousafzai		2013	Malala Yousafzai received International Prize for Equality and Non-Discrimination in Mexico in November 2013. The award seeks to recognize Malala's efforts for "the protection of human rights" and especially her fight to protect the right to education without discrimination on "grounds of age, gender, sex and religion.
Nikkei Asia Prize	Edhi Foundation		2017	Nikkei Asia Prize is a Japanese peace award which is presented by Nihon Keizai Shimbun (popularly known as The Nikkei) to those individuals who work to improve lives of Asian people. In 2017, Faisal Edhi (son of late Abdul Sattar Edhi) received 22nd Nikkei Asia Prize in Tokyo on behalf of Edhi Foundation.
Messengers of Peace Heroes	Ali Muhammed		2021	Ali Muhammad (along with his scout team) planted trees in his area and conducted awareness sessions to guide younger people about the importance of trees and plants, as well as, to follow that action (planting trees). He also organized a sanitization campaign during COVID lockdown and guided more than 1500 locals.
International Peace Award for Democrats	Sherry Rehman		2008	Sherry Rehman, a Pakistani politician and a former Pakistan's Ambassador to the United States, received "International Peace Award for Democrats" from International Human Rights Commission on her contribution for the promotion of democracy and human rights in 2008.
Jane Drew Prize	Yasmeen Lari		2020	Yasmeen Lari holds a distinction of first Pakistani female architect who represented Pakistan on various international forums. In 2020, Yasmeen achieved Jane Drew Prize in recognition of her work that combines architecture with questions of social justice.
International GALAS Award	Nayyab Ali		2020	Nayyab Ali (an activist of Transgender rights) is the first Pakistani transgender person to win this international award. Nayab is a highly educated person from transgender community who also appeared in 2018 elections. In 2020, Nayab received the International GALAS Award from Dublin (Ireland) under category of International Activist.
Ambassador of Conscience Award	Malala Yousafzai		2013	The Ambassador of Conscience Award is highest honour given by Amnesty International. This award recognizes the contributions of individuals who work to enhance the cause of human rights and set examples in society by standing against injustice. Malala Yousafzai from Pakistan received this award from Bono in Dublin, Ireland in 2013.
Stefanus Prize	Asma Jahangir		2014	Asma Jahangir received Stefanus Prize in 2014. This human rights prize is awarded to individuals for their outstanding contributions to defending freedom of religion or belief as defined by the Article 18 of the Universal Declaration of Human Rights.
Civil Courage Prize	Shahnaz Bukhari		2003	Civil Courage Prize is presented by Train Foundation (a US-based non-profit organization) to the individuals who show exemplary work on human rights. Shahnaz Bukhari (an expert of clinical psychology and an activist of women's rights from Pakistan) won this award in 2003 for her contributions to eliminate violence against women.
Skoll Global Treasure Award	Malala Yousafzai		2014	Malala Yousafzai received Skoll Global Treasure Award in 2014. The Skoll Global Treasure Award is presented at the annual Skoll World Forum in Oxford, England.
Franco-German Prize for Human Rights	Nayyab Ali		2020	Nayyab Ali (a Pakistani Transgender Rights Activist) received Franco-German Prize for Human Rights in recognition of her efforts to improve the lives of transgender community in Pakistan in 2020. German Ambassador to Pakistan, Bernhard Schlagheck, and French Ambassador, Marc Barety, jointly presented the award to Nayyab Ali to pay tribute to her inspiring engagement in favour of the rights of the members of her community and of vulnerable women and children.
Stockholm Human Rights Award	Hina Jilani		2020	Hina Jilani received Stockholm Human Rights Award from Swedish Bar Association in 2020.
International Humanist Award	Gulalai Ismail		2014	Gulalai Ismail from Pakistan received International Humanist Award by the International Humanist and Ethical Union in 2014. Gulalai is from Khyber Pakhtunkhwa province of Pakistan and she works on human rights and public welfare. Aware Girls was an initiative founded by her through which she addressed most serious issues pertaining to the life of women in Khyber Pakhtunkhwa including their education, employment, health and safety.
Battle of Crete Award	Fouzia Saeed		2012	Fouzia Saeed is a social activist and folk culture promoter from Pakistan. In 2012, Washington Oxi Day Foundation awarded her with Battle of Crete Award on her courageous efforts for freedom and democracy, as well as, for her struggle against sexual harassment.
Asia Game Changer Awards	Malala Yousafzai		2014	Malala Yousafzai received Asia Game Changer Award in 2014. This is an annual award ceremony organized by Asia Society (a New York-based non-profit organization) in recognition of individuals and organizations within and connected to the Asian community that have made positive contributions to the development and improvement of Asia and society.
Asia Game Changer Awards	Sharmeen Obaid-Chinoy		2014	Sharmeen Obaid-Chinoy (a Pakistani-Canadian journalist, filmmaker and activist known for her work in films that highlight the inequality with women) received Asia Game Changer Award in 2014.
Fukuoka Prize	Yasmeen Lari		2016	A Pakistani humanitarian and female architect, Yasmeen Lari achieved Fukuoka Prize in the city of Fukuoka (Japan) in 2016 for her services towards Art and Culture. Fumihito, Prince Akishino (a member of Imperial House of Japan) also graced the event as chief guest.
Florence Nightingale Medal	Begum Mumtaz Chughtai		1977	The ceremony of Florence Nightingale Medal is organized by International Committee of the Red Cross (Geneva, Switzerland). Begum Mumtaz Chughtai was a medical officer and was working in the Armed Forces of Pakistan. In 1977, she received this medal from Pakistan President.
Democracy Award	Gulalai Ismail		2013	Democracy Award is given by National Endowment for Democracy (NED) which is a non-profit organization based in United States. The purpose of this award is to encourage and appreciate the individuals who courageously work on human rights and democracy. In 2013, Gulalai Ismail (a Pakistani human rights activist who established Aware Girls at the age of 16) received this award.
The Front Line Defenders Award	Society for Appraisal and Women Empowerment in Rural Areas		2014	The Front Line Defenders Award is an Irish award for human rights which is given by Front Line Defenders (a non-profit organisation from Dublin, Republic of Ireland) to the individuals who work for promotion and protection of the human rights around the globe. In 2014, this award was presented to Society for Appraisal and Women Empowerment in Rural Areas (SAWERA) which is currently working for people's rights in Khyber Pakhtunkhwa province and Federally Administered Tribal Areas of Pakistan. It was received by "Noorzia Afridi" (the founder and chairperson of SAWERA).
Right Livelihood Award	Asma Jahangir		2014	Asma Jahangir is the only Pakistani who received Right Livelihood Award. The award was being given to Jahangir in 2014.
APCOM Hero Asia Award	Nayyab Ali		2020	Nayyab Ali (a Pakistani Transgender Rights Activist) received APCOM Hero Asia Award under Transgender Category in 2020. The award ceremony was held in Bangkok, Thailand.
Patricia Blunt Koldyke Fellowship Award	Shehzad Roy		2009	Shehzad Roy is a Pakistani singer and humanitarian. Besides his singing career, he established "Zindagi Trust" (a non-profit organization) for improvement in quality of education in government based schools in Pakistan. Chicago Council on Global Affairs therefore awarded him with "Patricia Blunt Koldyke Fellowship on Social Entrepreneurship" in 2009 on his philanthropic work.
Global Good Governance Award	Dr. Zafar Iqbal Qadir		2016	Dr. Zafar Iqbal Qadir, a Pakistani philanthropist and founding chairman of "Taaleem Foundation" received Global Good Governance Award from World Congress of Muslim Philanthropists (WCMP) in Istanbul, Turkey. This award was presented to him on his efforts and contributions to educate the children from needy and deserving families.
The International Commendation Award	Chaudhary Qamar Iqbal		2018	Chaudhary Qamar Iqbal (a Norwegian Pakistani philanthropist) received "The International Commendation Award" from High Sheriff Manchester in Oslo. This award was presented to him for his philanthropic work for Norwegian-Pakistani community.
ACHA Peace Star Award	Ashfaq Fateh		2011	Ashfaq Fateh is a human rights activist from Pakistan who has been working mainly for Christian rights in Pakistan. He received "ACHA Peace Star Award" on his services for peace and communal harmony.
ACHA Peace Star Award	Sheema Kermani		2013	Sheema Kermani is an activist of women's rights from Pakistan. She is chairperson of Tehrik-e-Niswan (one of the most famous non-profit organizations that works for the rights and development of women in Pakistan). In addition to her social activism, Sheema is a maestro of Bharatanatyam dance and she chose the mediums of dance and theater to make awareness about different issues pertaining to women's rights and protection. In 2013, she received "ACHA Peace Star Award" from Oregon-based Association for Communal Harmony in Asia (ACHA) on her life-long contributions for peace and women's rights activism.

== International memorial awards ==
Title of Award	Winner	Portrait	Year	Achievements
Gandhi Peace Award	Abdul Sattar Edhi		2007	Gandhi Peace Award is presented by Promoting Enduring Peace to the individuals who work for peace and humanity. The award commemorates the memories of Mahatma Gandhi (the founder of India who performed key role in Indian independence movement). Abdul Sattar Edhi was the only Pakistani philanthropist and humanitarian who received this on his services for international peace and public welfare in 2007.
Nelson Mandela Peace Prize	Farhan Wilayat Butt		2025	Farhan Wilayat Butt, a humanitarian from Pakistan, was awarded the Nelson Mandela Peace Prize in 2025. He was recognized for his impactful work in promoting human rights, social inclusion, interfaith dialogue, and humanitarian relief across marginalized communities in Asia and Africa. The award was presented by the Foundation for World Peace on 21 September 2025, during the United Nations' International Day of Peace, to celebrate his dedication to global peace and justice.
Templeton Prize	Inamullah Khan		1988	Inamullah Khan was the founder of World Muslim Congress and an interfaith campaigner who spent his entire life with countless efforts to create peace all around the world by making unity and understanding specially among Muslims, Christians and Jewish nations. He received Templeton Prize from John Templeton Foundation in 1988. This memorial award commemorates the philanthropic work of John Templeton and is being given to philanthropists and peace activists only.
King George V Silver Jubilee Medal	Jahan Zeb of Swat		1935	Jahan Zeb of Swat (Wāli of Swat) received King George V Silver Jubilee Medal from King George V in 1935.
Bruno Kreisky Prize for Services to Human Rights	Benazir Bhutto		1988	Bruno Kreisky Prize for Services to Human Rights is a memorial award that commemorates Bruno Kreisky (a social democratic politician of Austria). This award is given to the individuals on their achievements in the field of human rights on international level. Benazir Bhutto (former Prime Minister of Pakistan) received this award in 1988.
Balzan Prize for Humanity, Peace and Fraternity among People	Abdul Sattar Edhi		2000	Balzan Prize for Humanity, Peace and Fraternity among People was established in memories and under assets of "Eugenio Balzan" (it) (1874–1953) who was an Italian journalist and entrepreneur. This award contains a monetary prize up to 1 Million Swiss Franc. Abdul Sattar Edhi from Pakistan received 2000 Balzan Prize on his life-long humanitarian services.
Mother Teresa Awards	Ansar Burney		2008	Mother Teresa Awards is a memorial award presented by Harmony Foundation to commemorate the services of Mother Teresa. The award is given to the humanitarians and peace activists on their exemplary contributions and achievements. Ansar Burney from Pakistan received this award for his services including release of hostages from Somali pirates and campaign to eliminate child camel jockeys.
Mother Teresa Awards	Malala Yousafzai		2012	Harmony Foundation (India) announced Malala Yousafzai as a winner of Mother Teresa Awards in 2012. However, Malala was not permitted to visit India due to some serious security issues. Sevi Ali (a British Pakistani actress) received the award on behalf of Malala.
Mother Teresa Awards	Diep Saeeda		2013	Diep Saeeda, a peace and human rights activist and founder of Institute for Peace & Secular Studies, received Mother Teresa Award for Social Justice in 2013.
Mother Teresa Awards	Bilquis Edhi		2015	Bilquis Edhi received Mother Teresa Award in 2015. According to the organizing committee, it was the triumph of Bilquis Bano Edhi against infanticide that made her the mother of hundreds of thousands of unwanted children and the mother of the thrown-away, and took her to the status of the planetary mother.
Diana Memorial Award	Ahmed Nawaz		2019	Ahmed Nawaz was the first Pakistani to receive Diana Memorial Award. He was one of the survivors of 2014 terrorist attack on Army Public School Peshawar (Khyber Pakhtunkhwa, Pakistan). He received this honour for his anti-radicalization youth campaign against terrorism and Talibans.
Diana Memorial Award	Aleena Azhar		2019	Aleena Azhar was the first Pakistani woman to receive Diana Memorial Award. Aleena is a young philanthropist who is doing social work for last many years. She has been arranging awareness camps to educate women about menstruation and has been guiding them about relevant medical services.
Diana Memorial Award	ConnectHear Team		2019	ConnectHear Team consists six young individuals (named: Arhum Ishtiaq, Azima Dhanjee, Areej Al Medinah, Zainab Syed, Syed Talal Ali, and Sadaf Amin) who are involved in different social and humanitarian activities in Pakistan. They received Diana Memorial Award on their humanitarian services in 2019.
Diana Memorial Award	Raina Khan Barki		2020	Raina Khan Barki from Lahore is founder of an NGO, named: "Zenana Foundation" and she has received Diana Award for her struggle in the field of women empowerment through health and education.
Diana Memorial Award	Umer Mukhtar		2020	Umer Mukhtar from Faisalabad received Diana Award through his efforts to eliminate inequalities from society through education. He founded two non-profit set-ups, named: "Kitaab Foundation" and "Sadaqat Foundation" for establishment of schools in rural areas.
Diana Memorial Award	Mohammad Ahmad Toor		2020	Mohammad Ahmad Toor from Rahim Yar Khan received Diana Award for empowering a huge number of youngsters through his non-profit organization 'MAPS'. He has organized more than 250 seminars on education and community development.
Diana Memorial Award	Nabila Abbas		2020	Nabila Abbas belongs to a small village Choti Zareen (located at Dera Ghazi Khan District). She achieved Diana Award on her services to provide education to girls and women of rural areas of Pakistan.
Diana Memorial Award	Muhammad Shoaib		2020	Muhammad Shoaib is from Lower Kurram Subdivision (Kurram District). He received Diana Award on his services for promotion of peace, literacy and healthcare facilities in the less-fortunate areas of Kurram district.
Diana Memorial Award	Hassan Ashraf		2021	Hassan Ashraf from Faisalabad, received Diana Memorial Award for his non-profit educational project, named "Umeed" (Hope). Through this non-profit educational project, more than 1500 children are currently getting free education.
Diana Memorial Award	Ayesha Sheikh		2021	Ayesha Sheikh from Sindh received the award on her services for promotion of quality education. She also works on health solutions for sustainability in marginalized communities.
Diana Memorial Award	Yumna Majeed		2021	Yumna Majeed from Lahore received the award for her services towards promotion of space sciences in schools and educational centres in Pakistan. She has also worked with astronauts from Nasa.
Diana Memorial Award	Izat Ullah		2021	Izat Ullah from Quetta received the award for his support to more than 5,000 young people on career counselling, as well as, for distribution of ration in hundreds of people needy and deserving people during COVID-19 pandemic.
Diana Memorial Award	Zubair Junjunia		2021	Zubair Junjunia from Karachi received Diana Award on his online services for quality education. He designed a blog and created his own exams, completely free of charge in order to educate deserving students from needy families.
Diana Memorial Award	Muhammad Asim Masoom Zubair		2021	Muhammad Asim Masoom Zubair from Bahawalpur (South Punjab) received the award on his healthcare services during COVID-19 pandemic. He distributed 5,000 bottles of hand sanitiser totally free of cost in deserving families to eliminate the risks of corona infection.
Diana Memorial Award	Muhammad Hamza Waseem		2021	Muhammad Hamza Waseem (being a student) established and run a magazine (named: Spectra) and published nearly 225 science articles in order to give maximum benefits to the students of science. He also arranged a huge science festival (under title of Lahore Science Mela) which was attended by thousands of people.
Diana Memorial Award	Eiman Jawwad		2021	Being the youngest one among all other Pakistani laureates of Diana Award, Eiman Jawwad received the award on her services to distribute garments in more than 700 burn-patients.
Diana Memorial Award	Ramna Saeed		2022	Ramna Saeed, a Gujranwala-based young women's rights activist received Diana Award 2022 for standing against sexual harassment, as well as, for her personal efforts to create safe spaces for females in the community to speak about sexual harassment and bullying they experience on a regular basis.
Diana Memorial Award	Iqra Bisma		2022	Iqra Bisma, an Islamabad-based young activist arranged more than 100 online sessions during COVID-19 pandemic including workshops and awareness sessions to guide youth about positive use of internet and social media. She has been associated with various national and foreign-based organizations which are working on Sustainable Development Goals (SDGs).
Diana Memorial Award	Faryal Ashfaq		2022	Faryal Ashfaq, a Lahore-based young activist received Diana Award for raising voice against gender-based violence. In the age of 17 only, she commenced humanitarian efforts and established her own non-profit organization (named: the mirrors) for speaking against gender-based violence.
Diana Memorial Award	Muhammad Amir Khoso		2022	Muhammad Amir Khoso, a Sukkur-based young activist received Diana Award for providing food, water, education and other basic necessities to the needy and deserving communities of interior Sindh. During the corona lockdown (when daily wager workers were suffering with unemployment), Khoso provided ration to more than 700 families.
Diana Memorial Award	Alizey Khan		2022	Muhammad Amir Khoso, a Lahore-based activist achieved Diana Award for fighting against food-poverty. She is currently running a non-profit setup (named: Ruhil Foundation) and arranges 5500 food parcels to deserving families every month. She also provides education to more than 150 children (who were involved in sex-work) through a non-profit organization, Begum Inayat Welfare Society.
Diana Memorial Award	Moazzam Shah Bukhari Syed		2022	Moazzam Shah Bukhari Syed, a Hyderabad-based activist achieved Diana Award for providing early education to more than 3000 local children. He also arranged educational scholarships for over 1400 children (located in remote villages near the India–Pakistan border).
Diana Memorial Award	Arqam Al-Hadeed		2022	Arqam Al-Hadeed, a Muzaffarabad-based activist (from the State of Azad Jammu and Kashmir, currently residing in Leeds, England) received Diana Award for his contributions towards interfaith harmony. He is currently representing more than 180,000 youth activists of House of Commons (Leeds) as an elected MP.
Diana Memorial Award	Moiz Lakhani		2022	Moiz Lakhani, a Karachi-based youth activist (currently residing in Toronto, Canada) received Diana Award for his projects to empower women, as well as, for providing a platform of "Ninja Girls" (a non-profit organization for teaching self-defense techniques to girls and women in order to save themselves from sexual abuse and physical abuse).
Diana Memorial Award	Aiza Abid		2022	Aiza Abid, a Pakistani-Canadian young activist established a non-profit organization, Aiza's Teddybear Foundation in 2013 and started supporting children in need around the globe. She arranges books, clothes, toys and blankets to the homeless children.
Diana Memorial Award	Sikander Sonny Khan		2022	Sikander Sonny Khan, an Overseas Pakistani (currently residing in the United States) received Diana Award for providing clean drinking water in the underprivileged areas of Pakistan. Sikander established Paani Project in 2017 for construction of water wells in the areas of Tharparkar, Mirpur Khas and Jacobabad. Till date, he has constructed more than 9000 water wells which provides clean water to a total population of 732,500 villagers.
Anne Frank Courage Award	Malala Yousafzai		2014	Malala Yousafzai was awarded Anne Frank Courage Award in London in 2015. Her father, Ziauddin Yousafzai, accepted the award on her behalf.
Muhammad Ali Humanitarian Award	Hadiqa Bashir		2015	Hadiqa Bashir is a social activist from Swat, Pakistan. She was awarded the Muhammad Ali Humanitarian Award for her work in ending child marriages.
Muhammad Ali Humanitarian Award	Shawana Shah		2016	Shawana Shah, an activist of women's rights from Peshawar, Khyber Pakhtunkhwa achieved Muhammad Ali Humanitarian Award in 2016 for her contributions on gender discrimination and for raising voice on violence against women's rights and protection in Khyber Pakhtunkhwa, Pakistan.
Gwangju Prize for Human Rights	Munir A. Malik		2008	Gwangju Prize for Human Rights is a South Korean memorial award which commemorates the Gwangju uprising. It is presented by May 18 Memorial Foundation along with a cash prize up to 50,000 US Dollars to the individuals and organizations who contribute their efforts for promotion of human rights, democracy and peace. Munir A. Malik (former president of the Supreme Court Bar Association of Pakistan and 30th Attorney General of Pakistan) received this award in 2008.
Kurt Schork Award	Shah Meer Baloch		2020	Shah Meer Baloch (a freelance journalist from Pakistan) achieved Kurt Schork Award for his courageous freelance work. Shah Meer reported most sensitive issues of Pakistani society including child labour and slave mining.
Gleitsman International Activist Award	Malala Yousafzai		2018	Gleitsman International Activist Award is a memorial award presented by Center for Public Leadership, John F. Kennedy School of Government in commemoration of the late Alan Gleitsman (professor of Social Innovation) to encourage the leaders and innovators who bring positive changes in society and become an inspiration to others. For promoting peace and girl's education worldwide; Malala Yousafzai from received this award in 2018 along with a cash prize of 150,000 US Dollars.
Nelson Mandela – Graça Machel Innovation Award	Tabassum Adnan		2016	Tabassum Adnan received Nelson Mandela – Graça Machel Innovation Award in 2016 during the event of International Civil Society Week in Bogotá, Colombia. Tabassum belong to a small town of Khyber Pakhtunkhwa and has been making efforts for the educational and social rights of local women.
The Elizabeth Neuffer Memorial Prize	Haroon Janjua		2015	Haroon Janjua is a freelance journalist from Pakistan. He won "The Elizabeth Neuffer Memorial Prize" from United Nations Correspondents Association in 2015 on his article (titled: Brick kiln workers: the endless battle) published in The Friday Times. He highlighted and unveiled the miseries associated with brick-making labour who are forcefully kept under debt bondage.
Fred and Anne Jarvis Award	Malala Yousafzai		2013	Fred and Anne Jarvis Award has been established by National Union of Teachers (England) to commemorate the memories of Fred Jarvis and his wife. Malala Yousafzai from Pakistan received this award in 2013.
Karic Brothers Award	Muniba Mazari		2017	Muniba Mazari is an activist, artist, model, TV anchor and a motivation speaker from Pakistan. She is popularly known as "The Iron Lady of Pakistan" due to her fight with fears, disability and loneliness. She got disabled after a car accident and serious injuries but later on, she reinvented herself by starting painting. She adopted an orphan child and started making public appearances on different television programmes and broke the stereotypes about disabled persons by starting modeling projects on wheelchair. On her bravery, courage and philanthropy services, she received Karic Brothers Award in Belgrade, Serbia under the category of humanitarian services.
International Reflections of Hope Award	Malala Yousafzai		2013	Oklahoma City National Memorial & Museum awarded Malala Yousafzai with International Reflections of Hope Award in 2013 for her human rights work. The ceremony took place in Oklahoma City. "Oklahoma City National Memorial & Museum" was actually established in commemoration of the victims and survivors of Oklahoma City bombing. International Reflections of Hope Award is therefore issued by this national memorial every year in favour of those individuals who stand against terrorism and violence.
International Reflections of Hope Award	Ziauddin Yousafzai		2013	Oklahoma City National Memorial & Museum awarded Ziauddin Yousafzai with International Reflections of Hope Award in 2013 for his services on human rights and education. He jointly received the award along with his daughter (Malala Yousafzai) during the prize ceremony.

== International women's awards ==
Title of Award	Winner	Portrait	Year	Achievements
International Women of Courage Award	Begum Jan		2008	Begum Jan received a 2008 International Women of Courage Award, making her the first Pakistani woman to receive that award. Begum Jan (a doctor by profession) belongs to South Waziristan and is making efforts to educate the less educated women of Khyber Pakhtunkhwa about their rights and medical facilities.
International Women of Courage Award	Ghulam Sughra		2011	Ghulam Sughra grew up in a conservative environment of Kot Diji near Khairpur, Sindh where women had lesser rights. In such environment, Sughra got people's attention by getting education. She got married in a very early age but after dissolution of her marriage after a few years, she got more prominence as she was the first girl in the village who was divorced. After got rejection and humiliation from her family, she continued her education and later on got a source of earning by joining a local school as a teacher. She received International Women of Courage Award in 2011 on her contributions towards peace, human rights and social development for women of Sindh region.
International Women of Courage Award	Shad Begum		2012	Shad Begum belongs to Dir Lower which is one of the less developed areas of Khyber Pakhtunkhwa with no proper opportunities for women. In these circumstances, Shad proved herself by completing her college graduation and by establishing Association for Behaviour and Knowledge Transformation (ABKT) for arrangement of development opportunities for women of Khyber Pakhtunkhwa. Even after attacks by Taliban, Shad continued her mission by shifting her organizational setup to Peshawar. She was awarded with the International Women of Courage Award by the US First Lady Michelle Obama and the Secretary of State Hillary Clinton on March 8, 2012.
International Women of Courage Award	Tabassum Adnan		2015	Tabassum Adnan (an activist of women's rights) is from Swat Valley. She established women's jirga (women's council) to resolve legal issues of local women (pertaining to their rights and protection). She fought against many serious issues including honour killing, sexual harassment and acid attacks which are too common in the male-dominating society of Khyber Pakhtunkhwa. She won the U.S. State Department's 2015 International Women of Courage Award for her work on behalf of Pakistani women.
International Women of Courage Award	Jalila Haider		2020	Jalila Haider is a human rights activist from Quetta (Balochistan). She got more attention and fame as she was the first female advocate from Hazara Community and she started free counseling services to the needy and deserving women of Balochistan. She also worked to reduce discrimination against Hazaras by establishing a non-profit organization, We the Humans – Pakistan. She was chosen for International Women of Courage in March 2020 by the US Secretary of State.
Anna Politkovskaya Award	Malala Yousafzai		2013	Anna Politkovskaya Award is given by an international non-profit organization, "RAW in WAR (Reach All Women in War)" every year to female activists from around the globe who defend women's rights and work for women's development. Malala Yousafzai received Anna Politkovskaya Award in 2013 for her efforts and contributions for equal education opportunities for Pakistani girls.
Anna Politkovskaya Award	Gulalai Ismail		2017	Gulalai Ismail is an activist of human rights from Khyber Pakhtunkhwa. She established a non-profit organization, named: Aware Girls to address most serious issues pertaining to the life of women in Khyber Pakhtunkhwa including their education, health and safety. She also started educating the Pashtun women about their rights. She received the 2017 Anna Politkovskaya Award for her efforts and contributions. She was joint winner, with murdered journalist and activist Gauri Lankesh.
Vital Voices Global Leadership Award	Malala Yousafzai		2013	Malala Yousafzai received Vital Voices Global Leadership Award in 2013. This award honors and celebrates women leaders around the world who are working to strengthen democracy, increase economic opportunity and protect human rights.
Jeane Kirkpatrick Award	Sherry Rehman		2011	Women's Democracy Network awarded Sherry Rehman (a Pakistani politician and a former Pakistan's Ambassador to the United States) with Jeane Kirkpatrick Award for her contributions to the advancement of women in politics and civil society in February 2011 at Washington, D.C., United States.
Asian Girls Human Rights Ambassador Award	Hadiqa Bashir		2016	Hadiqa Bashir is an activist from Swat valley who works to reduce and eliminate child marriage in Khyber Pakhtunkhwa. She started going house-to-house in Swat, meeting with the families to convince them to educate their young daughters, instead of marrying them off in an early age. In 2016, Hadiqa was given the 2016 Asian Girls Human Rights Ambassador Award for her efforts to stop child marriages.
Simone de Beauvoir Prize	Malala Yousafzai		2013	Simone de Beauvoir Prize is an international human rights prize for women's freedom. In 2013, Malala Yousafzai received this award in France for her services and advocacy for equal educational opportunities for girls and for their freedom to join schools and other educational institutions.

== International children's awards ==
Title of Award	Winner	Portrait	Year	Achievements
International Children's Peace Prize	Malala Yousafzai		2013	International Children's Peace Prize is one of the most highest ranking awards for minors who make significant contributions for rights, education and protection of children, as well as, for advocating against child labour and child abuse etc. Malala Yousafzai from Pakistan received this award from Tawakkol Karman (Nobel Peace Prize laureate) at a ceremony in The Hague (Netherlands) on September 6, 2013.
World's Children's Prize for the Rights of the Child	Iqbal Masih	A shy and afraid Iqbal Masih in picture	2000	Iqbal Masih was a young kid from a Pakistani Christian family. He was hired in a carpet factory as a child labour (debt slave child) in a very early age. After paying-off the debt in five years of day and night work; he started raising his voice for elimination of child labour and debt bondage of young child slaves in carpet factories. He got murdered in 1995 and received World's Children's Prize for the Rights of the Child 2000 posthumously.
World's Children's Prize for the Rights of the Child	Malala Yousafzai		2014	For her courage and fight against Taliban for the education of girls in Swat (Pakistan); Malala Yousafzai received World's Children's Prize for the Rights of the Child in 2014 in Stockholm, Sweden. After attack on Swat by Taliban, most of the girls' schools of the valley were closed due to continuous threats by Taliban. In such scenario, Malala Yousafzai continued going out to take school classes and got shot by Taliban. Later on recovered, she received appreciations and recognition on her courageous act and continuous efforts.
Caplow Children's Prize	Anita Zaidi		2013	Dr. Anita Zaidi is a Pakistani pediatrician who started a humanitarian project to save lives of thousands of newly-borne children in marginalized communities in fishing villages of Karachi. Among hundreds of the nominated projects, Anita's project was selected for Caplow Children's Prize worth 1 Million US Dollars for reduction of neonatal deaths of newly-borne babies in Karachi's slum.
Order of the Smile	Malala Yousafzai		2016	Order of the Smile is an international award which is basically given by the children to adults who are running development programmes for children or are involved in different activities related to care and support for children. As per the nomination criteria, only children can recommend a nominee for this award. Malala Yousafzai was the youngest Knight to ever receive the Order of the Smile in 2016 (then aged 19). She received this award for her efforts for girls education in Pakistan.
Jane Addams Children's Book Award	Malala Yousafzai		2018	Malala Yousafzai received Jane Addams Children's Book Award on a book authored by her (named: Malala's Magic Pencil) which narrates her story about fighting against Taliban's influence and occupation on Swat valley along with her small efforts to continue her education and motivating other girls of Swat to carry on their school classes. This book was internationally acclaimed and she received the award in 2018.

== See also ==
- List of Pakistani Nobel laureates
- List of Pakistani journalists
- List of Pakistani writers
- List of Pakistanis
- List of Pakistani lawyers
- List of Pakistani poets
- List of Pakistani scientists
- List of Pakistani actresses
- List of Pakistani actors
- List of Pakistani models
- List of Pakistani Americans
- List of Pakistanis by net worth
