= Ágnes Osztolykán =

Hungarian politician

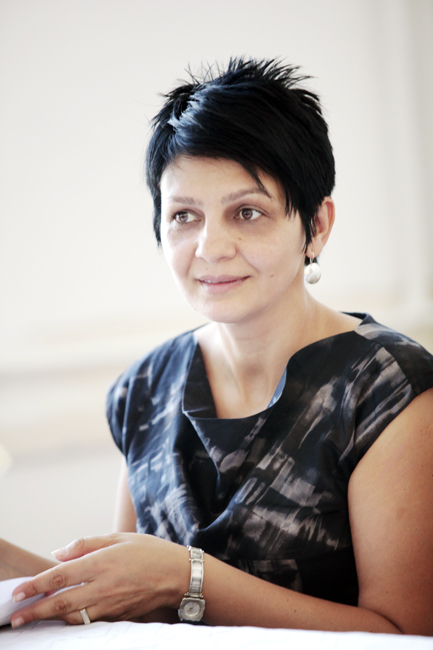

Member of the National Assembly
- In office 14 May 2010 – 5 May 2014

Personal details
- Born: 1974 (age 51–52) Csenger, Hungary
- Party: LMP
- Spouse: János Balog
- Children: Zsombor Bence Balog
- Profession: Roma activist

Ágnes Osztolykán (born 3 November 1974, Csenger, Hungary) is a Hungarian politician and Romani activist. She was a member of the National Assembly of Hungary for the LMP – Hungary's Green Party between 2010 and 2014.

She is a recipient of the 2011 International Women of Courage Award from the United States Department of State.

== Life ==
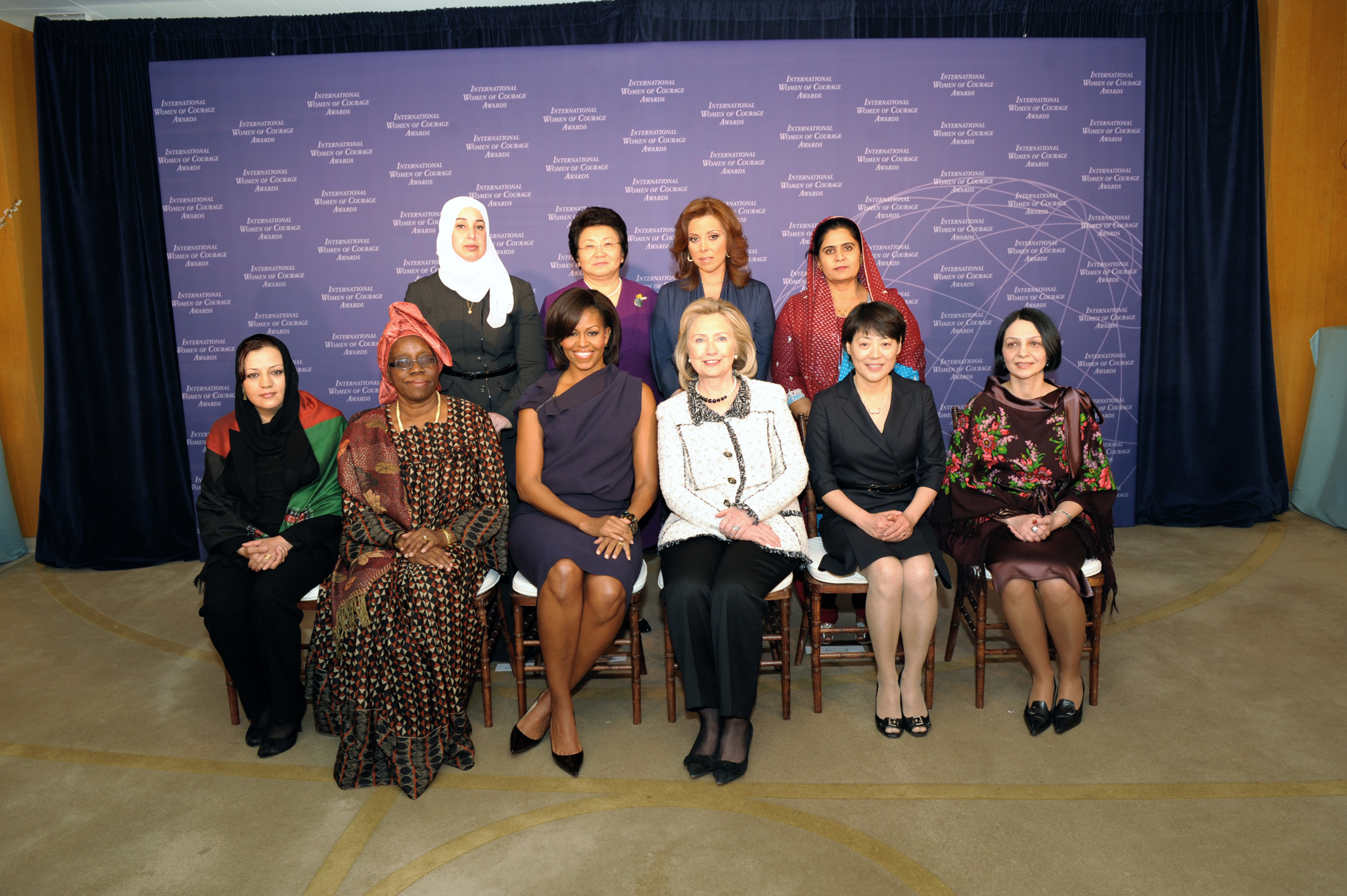
Ágnes Osztolykán (sitting in the first row on the right end) poses on the 2011 Women of Courage Award ceremony, March 8, 2011. Back row standing, left-to-right: Eva Abu Halaweh of Jordan, Roza Otunbayeva of Kyrgyzstan, Marisela Morales Ibañez of Mexico, Ghulam Sughra of Pakistan. Front row seated, left-to-right: Maria Bashir of Afghanistan, Henriette Ekwe Ebongo of Cameroon, Michelle Obama, Hillary Clinton, Jianmei Guo of China

Osztolykán graduated from the University of Miskolc in 1998 with a degree in political science. She subsequently worked for the Soros Foundation, and then was head of the Decade of Roma Inclusion Program at the Ministry of Social Affairs and Labor for six years.

She was elected to Parliament in 2010 and was a member of the parliamentary group of Lehet Más a Politika (LMP), or Politics Can Be Different Party. On 26 November 2012, she was appointed deputy leader of the LMP parliamentary group.

Osztolykán is an activist for Romani children's education, Roma and minority rights, and the social integration of Roma in Hungary. She is a strong supporter of vocational training which gives students marketable skills for the job market. Outside of her parliamentary duties, she works as a volunteer teacher at a primarily Roma vocational school in Budapest’s poorer Eighth District. She was appointed a counselor for Romani affairs in the Ministry of Human Resources in 2016.
