= Hamid bin Ahmad Al Rifaie =

Saudi Arabian activist and thinker (born 1940)

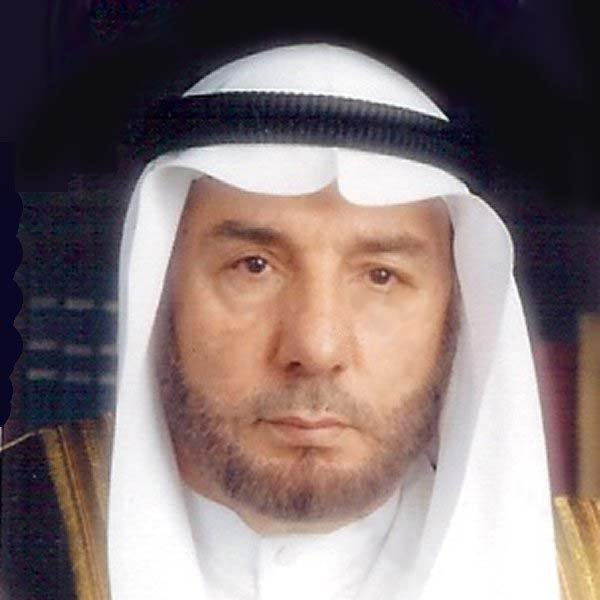
- Born: February 9, 1940 (age 86); Busor Alharer, Syria
- Died: 2026/03/19
- Occupations: President of IIFD & Co-President of WMC

Philosophical work
- Era: Modern era
- Region: Muslim scholar
- School: Sunni Islam
- Notable ideas: President of IIFD & Co-President of WMC

Hamid bin Ahmad Al Rifaie (Arabic: حامد بن أحمد الرفاعي) (born 1940) is a Saudi Arabian activist and thinker, president of the International Islamic Forum for Dialogue (IIFD ), and co-president of the World Muslim Congress.

== Biography ==
Al-Rifaie was born in 1940 in Busor Alharer village in the Huraan region of Syria to a well-known family. His father, Sheikh Ahmed bin Zaal Beck Al-Rifaie, was an American educated tribal leader. His grandfather, Sheikh Zaal Beck Al-Rifaie, was also from the leaders and dignitaries in Huraan. He played an important role in the national revolution against the French, and was the right-hand man of Huraan Sheikh Ismail Pasha Al-Rifaie during and after the French mandate over Syria.

Hamid Al Rifaie earned his B.Sc. in chemistry and geology from the University of Damascus and M.Sc. in industrial organic chemistry from Al-Azhar University and Surry University. He was awarded his PhD in organic chemistry from Cairo University.

== Career ==
=== International Islamic Forum for Dialogue ===
Al-Rifaie, during his activities in IIFD, signed more than ten protocols pertaining to dialogue between IIFD and international cultural and religious foundations such as:

- The Pontifical Council for Interreligious Dialogue - Vatican.
- The American National Council of the Churches of Christ-Washington.
- The Middle East Council of Churches - Cyprus.
- The World Council of Churches - Geneva.
- The Russian Cultural Glory Center - Moscow.
- The World Buddhist Sangha Council - Taiwan .
- The Middle East Institute for Peace and development - New York.
- The World Hindu Council - New Delhi.

=== Academic position ===
- Secondary School - Teacher of Chemistry, 1962–1978.
- Professor of industrial organic chemistry–King Abdul Aziz University, 1978–1998.

=== Positions in the field of Islamic activities ===
- Member of Presidential institution, International Islamic Council for Da'wah and Relief.
- Co-president, Islamic-Catholic Liaison Committee – Vatican.
- Member of Committee of the Islamic Coordination in the Organisation of the Islamic Conference (OIC).
- Member of the experts Committee for Strategic Studies at the Organisation of the Islamic Conference (OIC).
- Vice President of the Islamic Information Committee.
- Member of the International Islamic Charity Commission.
- Member of the International Commission on Scientific Signs in the Qur'an and the Sunnah.
- Member 100Grop for world Peace.
- Member the World Council of the Religious Leaders.
- Member Supreme Committee of AL-Risalah Channel.
- Member of the world supreme council of the Mosques formerly.
- Prof. at King Abdul Aziz University formerly.
- Member of several international organizations and commissions.

== Publications ==
- Several research papers in Chemistry.
- A great number (over 85) of papers, essays, and other publications in the field of Islamic thought and Civilizational Studies such as:
- "The Islamic Nation and the Crisis of Civilization".
- "Mutual Acquaintance and human Security".
- "Muslims and the West".
- "Civility of Dialogue and disagreement in Islam".
- "World Systems and Human Rights and Obligations".
- Ethics of Islamic Discourse Addressed to Non-Muslims".
- "Jerusalem and Secure Peace".
- "And What about Globalization and Globalization?
- "Yes to Dialogue, No to Dialogue".
- "Human Generations and Their Need to Be Introduced to the Islamic Project of Civilization".
- "A Strategic Study of the Present and Future of Islamic Work".
- "The Future Form of Unity and Islamic Solidarity".
- "Globalization and Globalization: An Islamic Perspective".
- "Civilization and the Problem of Terminology and Performance".
- "The Intermediary community as a Rational Basis for the Dialogue of Civilizations".
- "Complementarity of Civilizations".
- "Islam and the launching Points of a Common Ground for World Civilizations".
- The Other and the Problem of Terminology and Dialogue.
- Partners Not Guardians: Islam and Its Response to Human Security Aspirations.
- Here we are ! Who are you ?
- AL-Bi'aoiah( Islamic Social contract) and the Democracy.
- Come to a Just Word.
- But you are Scum!
- March of dialogue in the recent history.
- Secularism between extremism and moderation.
- Al-Wasatiyyah And Orthodox pivot for dialogue of cultures.
