= Basdila =

- village
- Location in Uttar Pradesh, India Basdila (India)
- Coordinates: 26°50′18″N 82°58′07″E
- Country: India
- State: Uttar Pradesh
- District: Sant Kabir Nagar

Area B
  - Total: 25 km^{2} (9.7 sq mi)

Population (Muslim/Hindu)
  - Total: 5,000
  - Rank: 1st in Indian village
  - Density: 200/km^{2} (520/sq mi)

Languages
  - Official: Urdu, Hindi
- Time zone: UTC+5:30 (IST)
- Postal code: 272175
- Vehicle registration: UP-
- Coastline: 0 kilometres (0 mi)
- Nearest city: Gorakhpur

Basdila is a village in district Basti (currently falling under Sant Kabir Nagar district) in Uttar Pradesh in North India.

Basdila is known for the Sunni madrasa Darul Uloom Ahle Sunnat established in the British Era, pre-independence India. The madrasa is a government-aided institute established around 1940, currently serving approximately 600 students. The foundation stone of this school was laid down by Inamullah Khan.

The village has a Medium Hindi Govt Primary school and a Medium Hindi Govt Secondary school (Janta Inter College Basdila).
