= International Islamic Council for Da'wah and Relief =

Islamic organization based in Cairo, Egypt

The International Islamic Council for Da'wah and Relief (IICDR and variously Dawa'a, Dawaa, Dawah or Da’wa) (Arabic: المجلس الإسلامي العالمي للدعوة والإغاثة), headquartered in Cairo, Egypt, consists of 86 Islamic organizations. Its stated purpose is to promote the message of Islam, improve relations between Islamic peoples, and provide aid and assistance for the needy, orphans, and widows.

IICDR includes more than one hundred Islamic NGOs and GOs all over the world. The Presidency Staff Council consists of Sheikh Al Azhar (president), Marshal AbdelRahman Sowar Al Dahap (vice-president), Al Sheikh Yousf Al Hegy (vice-president), Abdulah Salih Al Obeid (vice-president), Dr Abdullah bin Abdulaziz Al-Musleh (secretary-general), and Presidents of Specialized Committees in the council Abdullah Omar Nasseef (IICI) Abdulmalik Al Hamar (IICHR) S. Abdien (IICW&CH), and Hamid Bin Ahmad Al-Rifaie (president of IIFD).

Stated goals include guiding Islamic work and activities; organizing the efforts of the Islamic Umma (Muslim Nation) to be in service of Islamic issues; and activating divine values to achieve human dignity, security, and justice on Earth.

== Controversy ==
=== Spreading of radical ideas ===
On 23 November, 2017, the International Islamic Council was designated as a terrorist Organization and was added to the Anti-Terrorism Quartet Watchlist for Anti Terrorism by Saudi Arabia, Bahrain, Egypt, and UAE. This followed the 2017 Qatar diplomatic crisis and Qatar's affiliation with supporting the Muslim brotherhood and facilitating the spreading of radical views and extremist agendas and propaganda throughout the Arab world.

== Members and office holders ==
The Secretary-General is Dr Abdullah bin Abdulaziz Al-Musleh.

Member organizations:

- International Islamic Forum for Dialogue (IIFD)
- Abibakr As-Sidiq Philanthropic Home - Nigeria
- Al-Azhar al-Shareef - Cairo
- Muslim World League - Mecca
- World Muslim Congress - Pakistan
- Direct Aid - Kuwait
- Common Islamic Conference of Al-Quds (Jerusalem, Jordan)
- World Assembly of Muslim Youth - Riyadh
- Human Relief Foundation - United Kingdom
- International Humanitarian and Charity Organisation - United Arab Emirates
- Islamic Abo Al-Nor Complex - Damascus
- Ministry of Al Aogaf and Islamic Affairs - Egypt
- Ministry of Al Aogaf & Islamic Affairs - Morocco
- Indonesian Supreme Council for Islamic Daw'ah - Jakarta
- Islamic Wagaf Foundation for Education & Guidance - Nigeria
- Kuwait Zakat House - Kuwait
- Islamic Solidarity Fund of the Organisation of Islamic Cooperation - Saudi Arabia
- Islamic Union of the Student Organization - Turkey
- Jordanian Hashemic Foundation for Charity
- Islamic Union of North America - USA
- Dar Al Fatwah - Lebanon
- World Islamic Council - London
- Union of the Islamic Organization - France
- Ministry of Islamic Affairs & aL Aogaf - UAE
- Ministry of Islamic Affairs & aL Aogaf - Qatar
- Organization of Islamic Daw'a - Sudan
- Ministry of Islamic Affairs & Al Aogaf - Kuwait
- Open American University - USA
- Union of the Islamic Organization - Europe
- International Islamic Committee for Woman and Child (IICWC)
- International Islamic Relief Organization
- World Assembly of Muslim Youth
