= Margaret Somerville =

Professor of Bioethics at University of Notre Dame Australia

Margaret Somerville AM FRSC
- Born: 13 April 1942 (age 84); Adelaide, South Australia
- Other name: Margaret Anne Ganley Somerville
- Occupation: Ethicist

Margaret Anne Ganley Somerville AM FRSC (born 13 April 1942) is a Catholic philosopher and professor of bioethics at University of Notre Dame Australia. She was previously Samuel Gale Professor of Law at McGill University.

== Early life and career ==
Somerville was born in Adelaide, South Australia, and educated at Mercedes College (Springfield, South Australia). She received a A.u.A. (pharm.) from the University of Adelaide in 1963, a Bachelor of Law degree (Hons. I) and the University Medal from the University of Sydney in 1973, and a D.C.L. from McGill University in 1978.

=== Legal academic career ===
In 1978, she was appointed assistant professor in the law faculty at McGill. She was appointed an associate professor in 1979 and an associate professor in the faculty of medicine in 1980. In 1984, she became a full professor in both faculties, and in 1989, she was appointed the Samuel Gale Professor of Law. From 1986 to 1996, she was the founding director of the McGill Centre for Medicine, Ethics and Law and was appointed acting director in 1999. She also taught seminars on advanced torts and comparative medical law at McGill. Her archive is held at the McGill University Archives.

In November 2006, she gave the five annual Massey Lectures on CBC Radio in Canada. An expanded version of the lectures was published in Canada, Australia, and the United States in book form as The Ethical Imagination: Journeys of the Human Spirit.

=== Involvement in same-sex marriage debate ===
Somerville presented both a brief and an oral presentation to the Canadian House of Commons Standing Committee on Justice and Human Rights opposing the legalisation of same-sex marriage in Canada in 2003.

== Honours ==
Among many honours and awards, in 1990, Somerville was made a Member of the Order of Australia "for service to the law and to bioethics". In 1991, she was made a Fellow of the Royal Society of Canada and in 2022 a fellow of the Royal Society of New South Wales. In 2004 she was chosen by an international jury as the first recipient of UNESCO's Avicenna Prize for Ethics in Science.

She has received honorary degrees from University of Windsor (1992), Macquarie University (1993), St. Francis Xavier University (1996) and the University of Waterloo (2004). Her honorary degree awarded 19 June 2006, at Ryerson University in Toronto was controversial because of her objections to same sex marriage. She has since received honorary degrees from Mount Saint Vincent University in Halifax, Nova Scotia (2009), St. Mark's College, Vancouver (2010) and the Royal Military College of Canada in Kingston, Ontario (2013).

In 2006, Somerville was nominated for membership in the Order of Canada by Carol Finlay, a professor at the Toronto School of Theology. Finlay says Somerville was turned down for the honour because she was "too controversial."

In 2020, Pope Francis named Somerville a Dame of the Order of Saint Gregory the Great for contributions to Bioethics.

== Selected bibliography ==
- Do We Care?: Renewing Canada's Commitment to Health (Editor) (1999, ISBN 0-7735-1878-9)
- The Ethical Canary: Science, Society, and the Human Spirit (2000, ISBN 0-670-89302-1)
- Death Talk: The Case Against Euthanasia and Physician-Assisted Suicide (2001, ISBN 0-7735-2201-8)
- The Ethical Imagination: Journeys of the Human Spirit (2006, ISBN 0-88784-747-1)
- Bird on an Ethics Wire: Battles about values in the Culture Wars (2015, ISBN 9780773546400)

== See also ==
- Avicenna Prize
