= AbdulRazzaq Ibrahim Salman =

Nigerian activist

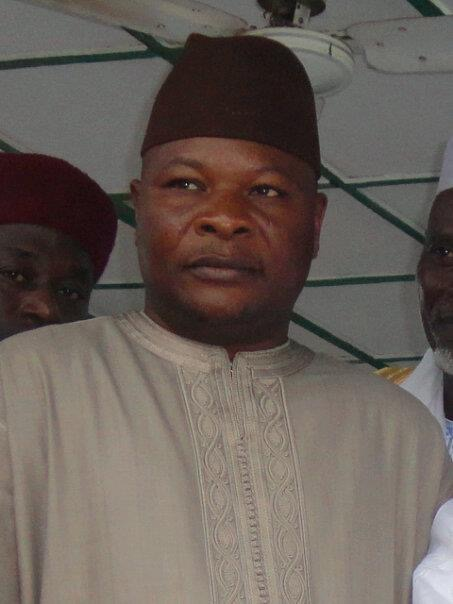
- Born: Ilorin, Nigeria
- Other name: Sholagberu
- Occupation: Islamic Scholar

Mallam AbdulRazzaq Ibrahim Salman is a Nigerian Muslim leader and activist from Ilorin, Kwara, best known as the President of Abibakr As-Sidiq Philanthropic Home. Salman was born and raised in Ilorin, Kwara. In 1998 he founded Abibakr As-Sidiq Philanthropic Home, a non-governmental organization in Kwara State, Nigeria. He is serving as the executive director of the World Muslim Congress, Nigerian Office.

== Charity Works ==
Mallam AbdulRazzaq Ibrahim Salman has carried out charitable activities in different regards. He founded Abibakr As-Sidiq Philanthropic Home, an Islamic Charitable organization in Nigeria that helps the poor people in the community. He created AbdulRazzaq Education Trust Fund, that provides cash supports to students in the Ilorin Emirate.
