= Qiu Renzong =

Chinese bioethicist

- Scientific career
- Fields: Bioethicist
- Institutions: Peking Union Medical College

Qiu Renzong (邱仁宗, c. 1933) is a Chinese bioethicist. He is a senior research fellow emeritus at China's Institute of Philosophy, and chair of the Academic Committee at the Centre for Bioethics at Peking Union Medical College. China Daily writes that he is regarded as the scholar who 30 years ago introduced bioethics to China.

Qiu published a paper in 2002 arguing for the recognition in China of animal rights, and introducing the idea of speciesism. He argued in favour of a gradualist approach to the recognition of rights, rejecting the abolitionist approach as unrealistic. His paper was criticized by Zhao Nanyuan, a professor at Tsinghua University, who wrote that animal rights arguments are foreign ideas and are "anti-humanity."

Qiu was awarded the 2009 UNESCO Avicenna Prize for Ethics in Science and he shared the Hastings Center's Henry Knowles Beecher Award with Solomon R. Benatar in 2011.

== Selected works ==
- Bioethics: Asian Perspectives: A Quest for Moral Diversity. Springer, 2004.

== See also ==
- List of animal rights advocates
