= Nayyab Ali =

Pakistani activist

- Born: Okara, Punjab, Pakistan
- Education: Bachelor's in Botany at University of Punjab; Masters in International Relations at Preston University
- Occupations: Activist and politician

Nayyab Ali is a Pakistani transgender activist with over ten years of experience advocating for and defending the human rights of the transgender community in Pakistan. Her work addresses issues such as gender inequality and focuses on economically empowering and improving the livelihoods of transgender individuals. In 2020, she was awarded the Franco-German Prize for Human Rights for her efforts in promoting transgender rights. Ali was also one of the first among thirteen transgender candidates to run for election in the 2018 Pakistan elections. Additionally, she is the first Pakistani to receive the GALA award and the first transgender woman to be elected as co-chairperson of the EVAW/G Alliance. In 2020, the United Nations Development Programme (UNDP) in Pakistan named her a Gender Equality Advocate.

== Personal life ==
Nayyab Ali was born in Okara, Pakistan. In the eighth grade, she was disowned by her family after coming out as transgender. She then lived with a guru while continuing her studies. Ali earned a Bachelor of Science (BSc) in Botany from the University of Punjab and a Master’s degree in International Relations from Preston University, Islamabad. During her school years, she experienced harassment. Additionally, she is a survivor of an acid attack.

== Career ==
Ali worked as a teacher before beginning her political career. She has also served as a Transgender Rights Expert Consultant and Master Trainer for the United Nations Development Programme (UNDP).

== Activism ==
Ali began her work for transgender rights at the age of 17 by writing articles and discussing issues affecting the transgender community. Her current efforts focus on advocating for the welfare of the transgender community in Pakistan and managing the Khawaja Sira Community Centre in Okara. The centre offers various programs for transgender individuals, including basic literacy and numeracy, vocational training, life skills education, and driving classes. In addition to her advocacy, Ali has also worked as an independent consultant with the United Nations.

She has also served as the Chairperson of the All Pakistan Transgender Election Network (APTEN). For the past decade, Ali has provided technical support to government institutions to improve the lives of the transgender community and ensure their basic human rights.

Ali has provided technical support to incorporate community input and establish the foundational legislative framework for the protection of transgender rights in Pakistan.

== Politics ==
In 2018, a historic bill was enacted, granting the transgender community the right to obtain legal documents, vote, and run in elections. Ali, along with 12 other transgender candidates, became one of the first transgender individuals to stand in the 2018 Pakistan elections. She ran for the National Assembly seat NA-142 in Okara, contesting on PTI's Ayesha Gulalai's ticket, and received a total of 1,197 votes, surpassing many of her female counterparts.

Ali is a member of the Provincial Voter Committee of the Election Commission of Pakistan and is also part of the All Pakistan Transgender Election Network in Punjab.

== Awards ==
In 2020, Nayyab Ali became the first person from Pakistan to receive the GALA International Activist Award in Dublin, Ireland. The awards, organized by the National LGBT Federation of Ireland (NXF), recognized Ali as "an international activist outside of Ireland who works tirelessly to promote the full equality and inclusion of gender minorities in society." She is also a laureate of the Franco-German Prize for Human Rights & the Rule of Law and received the APCOM HERO Asia Award in the Transgender category in 2020.

Nayyab Ali was the first Pakistani transgender person to win the 2nd Interactive Youth Forum (ISYD) 2020 award for her work in ensuring basic rights for her community.
