= Fouzia Saeed =

Pakistani activist, folk culture promoter, commentator and author

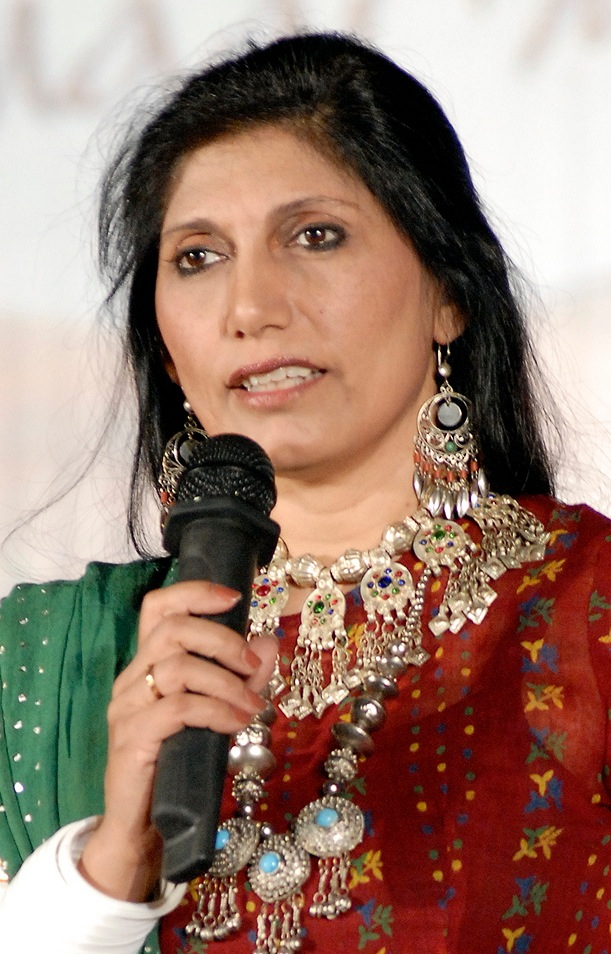
- Fouzia Saeed opening a Manganhaar Festival
- Born: Lahore, Punjab, Pakistan
- Occupations: Director General, Pakistan National Council of the Arts Former Executive Director, Lok Virsa, Pakistan National Institute for Folk and Traditional Heritage
- Known for: Author of TABOO: The Hidden Culture of a Red Light District

Fouzia Saeed is a Pakistani social activist, gender expert, trainer/facilitator, development manager, folk culture promoter, television commentator, and author.

Saeed is well known in the activist circles of Pakistan's social movement, having worked for decades on women's issues, especially those linked to violence against women, prostitution, women in the entertainment business, women’s mobility and sexual harassment. Her work on violence against women spans over 20 years and includes founding Bedari, the first women’s crisis center in Pakistan in 1991. For over a decade, she focused on reducing the level of sexual harassment and the impact of debt bondage on Hindu women.

On 10 March 2009, the Pakistan People's Party Prime Minister of Pakistan, Yousaf Raza Gilani, named Saeed to a three-year term as one of the 15 members of the National Commission on the Status of Women. Subsequently, Prime Minister Gilani appointed Saeed as the Chair of the Sexual Harassment Legislation Implementation Watch Committee from May 2010 to May 2012.

In February 2015, the Pakistan Muslim League prime minister, Nawaz Sharif, appointed Saeed as the executive director of Lok Virsa, the National Institute of Folk and Traditional Heritage. She completed her term on 9 February 2018 with exuberant accolades from the press and civil society for her success in revitalizing Lok Virsa and expanding the space for performance culture in Pakistan.

In January 2020, the Pakistan Tehreek-e-Insaf Prime Minister, Imran Khan, appointed Saeed as the Director General of the Pakistan National Council of the Arts (PNCA).

In February 2020, she was recognized as one of the ten most outstanding women leaders of Pakistan by HUM TV "in recognition of her exemplary services for promotion of Pakistani culture, women’s issues, courageous stand against sexual harassment and commitment to women’s advancement".

In July 2021, while on a road expedition for PNCA to central Balochistan to identify young artistic talent, Saeed suffered serious injuries in a road accident. By July 2022, she had begun to reengage in Pakistani society. A women's group produced a short video in June 2022 enumerating her manycontributions to the advancement of Pakistani women.

Saeed says of herself: "I want to be judged by my abilities, my struggles and my achievements and not labeled or stereotyped by my gender, my economic background, my nationality or my beliefs."

== Personal profile ==
Saeed received most of her schooling and early college education in Peshawar, Pakistan, where she graduated from the University of Peshawar with a BS in Home Economics as the University Gold Medallist for Academic Excellence in 1979. As a result of her academic achievements, she received a Quaid-e-Azam Overseas Educational Award and spent 8 years at the University of Minnesota, where she earned an MS in design and a doctorate in education. She received additional funding from the Ethel L. Parker International Fellowship Award of the American Home Economics Association for her doctoral research. Saeed returned to her native Pakistan immediately after completing her degrees, but has returned to Minneapolis on several occasions as a visiting lecturer and to receive a Distinguished International Alumni Award in 1998 and the International Leadership Award in 2008, both presented by the University of Minnesota in recognition of her contributions to the field of education and the women’s movement in Pakistan.

The government of Japan named Saeed as one of seven Asian Leadership Fellows for 2010. She attended the Fellowship program in Tokyo from September to November 2010 and gave lectures at numerous Japanese universities and wrote about her experiences on her return.

Saeed was awarded the 2012 Battle of Crete Award by the Oxi Day Foundation for 'courageous action for freedom and democracy' based on her decade-long struggle for the criminalisation of sexual harassment in Pakistan.

She served as the director of Mehergarh: A Center for Learning where she headed its programs on youth, gender and human rights from 2004 until 2012. She remains an informal advisor.

Between September 2012 and February 2015, Saeed was a Fellow at the US National Endowment for Democracy (DC), Draper-Hills Fellow at Stanford University (California), Visiting Fellow at George Mason University (Virginia) and Pakistan Scholar at the Woodrow Wilson International Center for Scholars (DC) under the Smithsonian Institution.

She currently lives in Islamabad, Pakistan with her husband, whom she met in 1995 when they were both working in the United Nations in Pakistan. They have also lived together in Manila, Kabul, and Cairo. She is one of the very few Pakistani women of her generation who has learned how to SCUBA dive and has dived in Pakistan, the Bahamas, the Mergui Archipelago of Burma, Fiji, and various islands of the Philippines.

== Literary Output ==
She is the author of several well-regarded books. Her first book is an ethnographic look at prostitution in Pakistan, TABOO!: The Hidden Culture of a Red Light District. Her second book, Working with Sharks: Countering Sexual Harassment in our Lives (Sanj, Pakistan, 2011 and Advances Press 26 February 2013), is an autobiographical exposé on sexual harassment in the United Nations and the revenge meted out by the UN management she and 10 other women faced for making their case. In 2012, she published Forgotten Faces: Daring Women of Pakistan’s Folk Theatre (National Institute of Folk and Traditional Heritage, 2011), a heavily illustrated book based on her field research on the dying art form of travelling theaters of Punjab in the late 1980s. While the Executive Director of the Lok Virsa, she conceived and edited a substantial coffee table book with text and 500 photographs, Folk Heritage of Pakistan: Glimpses into a Cultural Diversity (Lok Virsa, 2018) Her next book, On Their Own Terms: Early 21st Century Women's Movements in Pakistan(Oxford University Press, 2020) is based primarily on field research she did in Pakistan. The book covers four case studies of Pakistani women's efforts to regain their rights. The book also provides an introduction to the academic concept of women's individual and collective agency based on literary research conducted while she was a Fellow at the Wilson Center. Her latest book appeared after her accident. Tapestry: Strands of Women's Struggles in the History of Pakistan (Lightstone Publishers, Karachi, 2021). Research for Tapestry was conducted in Pakistan and the US Library of Congress while a Fellow at the Wilson Center. Tapestry provides a deep background to the modern cases covered in On Their Own Terms by chronicling the stages of women's political development throughout the history of Pakistan.

== Areas of work ==
=== Sexual harassment ===
In 2000, Saeed was instrumental in forming a network called AASHA (An Alliance Against Sexual Harassment) in Pakistan. Six organisations form the core membership of AASHA. They, along with several hundred individuals and organisations serve as partners and friends of AASHA. In 2002, AASHA, together with the Government, developed a Code of Conduct on gender relations at the workplace that was initially adopted voluntarily by over 130 companies in Pakistan. From 2002 onwards, AASHA continued to collaborate with the Government to press for the passage of a law requiring all public and private organisations to adopt and implement the Code. In November 2009 an amendment to the Pakistan Penal Code was passed by the Pakistan National Assembly explicitly making sexual harassment a cognisable offence anywhere in the country. This was ratified by the Senate on 20 January 2010 and signed into law with immediate effect by President Zardari on 29 January 2010. On 21 January 2010, the National Assembly approved a second bill requiring all organisations in Pakistan to adopt and implement the Code of Conduct. After lengthy debate, this bill was also passed by the Senate on 25 February and signed into law by the President on 9 March 2010. On 10 May 2010, Saeed was named by the NCSW to head the Government's Implementation Watch Committee, which will facilitate and monitor the progress of adoption of the sexual harassment legislation.

On 22 December 2010, Dr. Saeed, under the AASHA banner, organised the 10th Annual Working Women's Assembly. The Assembly was held in the Prime Minister's Auditorium and the Prime Minister, along with Fehmida Mirza, the Speaker of the National Assembly, Ferdous Awan, Minister of Women's Development and Shanaz Wazir Ali, officiated at the gathering of over 400 working women, including agricultural field workers, police officers, parliamentarians, doctors and senior government officials. In his speech, the Prime Minister declared 22 December as National Working Women's Day and he fulfilled a major aspect of the law by naming Ms. Musarrat Hilali as the first Ombudsperson for Women's Rights.

Although she had been working on gender issues since the late 1970s, her attention became more focused on this particular issue when she and ten other women found themselves trapped in a systematic sexual harassment scenario by several of their managers when she was working for an agency of the UN in Pakistan. Despite being competent, well respected and committed to their careers, they each had to take the risk of jointly reporting their supervisor to the UN Headquarters in New York. The women fought the case together, despite serious attempts by the UN leadership in Islamabad to break them up and discredit their professionalism, and finally won after nearly two years of effort. After the main perpetrator was removed from the UN, the case became widely known and resulted in many policy changes in the work environment of the entire UN system. However, as reported in May 2009, this issue remains one of the most difficult for the management of this large, international organisation to properly address. This case has been fully documented in Dr. Saeed's publication, Working with Sharks: Countering Sexual Harassment in our Lives. The publication of book was warmly received by a cross-section of Pakistani society. and internationally The book now has its own Facebook page. The early reviews of the book have praised her bravery while questioning how such a situation could unfold with the management of a well-known international development agency fully backing the perpetrator.

In her efforts to counter the stigma that Pakistani society attaches to the victims of sexual harassment Saeed has started to highlight the role of the harasser. Together with her colleagues from AASHA, she created a series of characters whose behaviour constitutes sexual harassment, whether knowingly or not. She gave each character a humorous name to break the aura that prevents women from complaining. Naming also concretises an issue and makes it manageable. Sabir Nazar, a famous cartoonist in Pakistan, drew the cartoons and they were compiled in a calendar for 2008. The response was electric with the calendar being reprinted several times. The calendar was widely discussed on television and in the press as a major breakthrough in shifting the public's perception of the root causes of harassment away from women's clothes and to on men's personal behaviour. A second calendar, with 12 new characters, was brought out in 2009, followed by a third in 2010. The final calendar appeared in January 2011 composed of the favourite 12 characters out of the original 36, selected by fans via internet voting. The calendars were reported on by several leading English language newspapers in Pakistan with full praise going to "the acerbic humour and intelligent wit of Dr. Fouzia Saeed of AASHA." The entire process of the AASHA movement from conception in 2001 to exit strategy following the passage of the law and rules in 2011 is contained in the Mehergarh publication titled The AASHA Experience: A decade of struggle against sexual harassment in Pakistan 2001 to 2011.

=== Violence against women ===
Saeed has worked extensively on issues of Violence against women (VAW) and its effects on women and their children over the past 25 years. Other than crisis counselling and sensitisation on the issues, she has given numerous talks on the subject of VAW in general, domestic violence, rape, incest, and bride burning. While studying in the United States at the University of Minnesota, Saeed actively volunteered at crisis centres in Minnesota. She received training as an advocate and a councillor to deal with violence survivors at Chrysalis . She worked on the helpline, counselling violence survivors on the phone and provided them with references for legal help, medical and shelter facilities. She also received training from Minnesota Intervention Center for facilitating small groups of women. Later, she conducted a research study for St Paul Intervention Center where she assessed the satisfaction level of violence survivors from the law enforcing agencies. This included police, courts, counselors and shelters. The outcomes of the report and the specific recommendations were presented to a body of senior judges and police officials. She also worked with St. Paul Intervention Center as a woman's advocate and volunteered in a program which provided violence survivors direct support after they had requested police intervention.

After returning to Pakistan in 1987, she joined Women’s Action Forum. She formed a taskforce under its Islamabad chapter called Committee for Violence Against Women. This committee analysed factors that have helped this violence persist and initiatives needed in the society to address some of these aspects. To deepen the discussion she and others on the task force organised workshops on the issue.

==== Bedari ====
Saeed was a founding member and executive director of, Bedari, a community organisation focused on women's issues, specifically related to violence. The organisation was founded in 1992 by Saeed and Ambreen Ahmad. At that time others among the core members who formed the first executive body included Sara Tirmazi, Shazreh Husain and Roshaneh Zafar. Bedari became the first Crisis Center in Pakistan that dealt with women experiencing violence.

=== Women in folk culture ===
Fouzia Saeed has been working throughout her career on women's issues in the field of folklore, development and social change. Her career started as a Deputy Director Research at the Pakistan National Institute of Folk and Traditional Heritage ( Lok Virsa Museum ) where she developed and supervised a folklore research program and contributed to improvement of the folklore archives and the library of the institute. She conducted research on various aspects of folklore, through the Institute and on her own. Her first research was on women in folk theatre in 1991. Recently, Lok Virsa requested her to update and enhance the book, which they published in 2011 as 'Forgotten Faces: Daring Women of the Pakistani Folk Theatre'. In the book, she chronicled the life of Bali Jatti, the first women to own a travelling stage theatre in Punjab, as a vehicle to capture the tradition of Punjabi folk theatre through the eyes of the female performers whose careers are spent in front of audiences of men who keep their wives hidden at home. The first review of the book,(Documenting Arts by Sarwat Ali) appreciated her ability to present these stage stars as real women who faced more than their share of troubles in their lives. She has also done research on other entertainment forms like folk circus, folk dances and folk natak (drama), and has mostly focused on women’s experiences in each of them.

Her book, Taboo: The Hidden Culture of a Red Light District, is the first book-length ethnography that captures the fading traditional systems of prostitution in Pakistan, with their close relationships with classical music and dance, as they are steadily replaced by the more exploitative modern brothel systems. The culture of the prostitutes serves as reverse-image of mainstream Pakistani society with their female heads-of-household and male family members who serve no economic purpose. Saeed used this culture as a mirror for Pakistanis to assess their own gender relations. For this reason, the book became a cult classic among young English-speaking Pakistanis. The book was published in English and Urdu by Oxford University Press and has been translated into Hindi and Marathi by nonprofit groups in India. A Japanese translation was published by Commons in October 2010.

She also contributed a shorter, more technical version of her book in an international collection of articles comparing legal systems for prostitution in Europe and Asia.

Saeed has been actively involved in reviving Pakistani folk performance arts through organisations she has been associated with, and is also a folk dancer herself. Together with the Folklore Society of Pakistan she helped to re-establish the Manganhar folk singing genre that had almost died out in Pakistan.

=== Media ===
Saeed has been associated with electronic media since 1977 when she was among the first female television news announcers on Pakistan Television Corporation (PTV) from Peshawar. She was a college student at the time. After completing her studies in the US, when she returned to Pakistan in 1987, she started her engagement with PTV again. This was through conducting programs for PTV and later with other television channels from time to time.

She hosted four different television series of talk shows on social and cultural issues: Hum Qadam, Bholi hui hun dastan, New Horizons and Rishtay (about 50 programs in total). In addition, she has hosted numerous live transmissions and special programs onvarious occasions.

She continues to appear on PTV and other channels as a commentator on political and social issues.

In October 2009, her last television program began on anti-Talibanization called Ye Kon Log Hen? (Who Are These People?). The program ran for three months. This program was a part of her larger agenda addressing the ways terrorists establish themselves in fragile communities. She organised a large gathering of citizens at the National Library on 23 June 2009 to map out a strategy for countering talibanisation in Pakistan. In 2010, she galvanized citizen support for a constitutional amendment formalizing local government as a third tier of the state administration as a part of her counter narrative agenda. She continues to broaden her counter narrative through her work at Lok Virsa.

She also produced documentaries about musicians of Pakistan during her tenure as DG PNCA.

== Bibliography ==
- Personal Profile - Dr Fouzia Saeed. (2017b, 26 April). Dr Fouzia Saeed. https://www.drfouziasaeed.org/personal-profile/
- Saeed, Fouzia (1987), Social Consequences of Overseas Education : Re-adjustment of Returning Pakistani scholars Dissertation: (Ph.D.)--University of Minnesota, 1987.
- Saeed, Fouzia (1990), "Folk Dances of Pakistan", Lok Virsa Research Journal
- Saeed, Fouzia (December 1990), "Violence Against Women", Women's World
- Saeed, Fouzia (1991), "Queen of Hearts", Newsline.
- Saeed, Fouzia (December 1991), "Prostitution in Shahi Mohalla", Women's World
- Saeed, Fouzia (2001), Taboo!: The Hidden Culture of a Red Light Area, Karachi: Oxford University Press, ISBN 0-19-579412-5
- Saeed, Fouzia (2006), "Chapter 6: Good women, bad women: prostitution in Pakistan", in Gangoli, Geetanjali; Westmarland, Nicole (eds.), International Approaches to Prostitution: Law and policy in Europe and Asia, The Policy Press, University of Bristol, pp. 141–164, ISBN 1-86134-672-7
- Saeed, Fouzia (September 2009), "Are We for a Democracy?", Newsline
- Saeed, Fouzia (2011), Working with Sharks: Countering Sexual Harassment in our Lives, Lahore: Sanj
- Saeed, Fouzia (2011), Forgotten Faces:Daring Women of Pakistan's Folk Theatre, Islamabad: Lok Virsa Press
- Saeed, Fouzia (6–12 March 2011), "of Myths and Men", The Express Tribune Magazine: 38–39
- Saeed, Fouzia (16–22 January 2011), "Some Like it Raw", The Express Tribune Magazine: 34–38
- Saeed, Fouzia (16–22 January 2011), "Some Like it Raw", The Express Tribune Magazine: 34–38
- Saeed, Fouzia (2011), The AASHA Experience: A decade of struggle against sexual harassment in Pakistan 2001-2011, Islamabad: Mehergarh: A Centre for Learning
- Saeed, Fouzia (2018), Folk Heritage of Pakistan: Glimpses into a Cultural Diversity, Islamabad: Lok Virsa
- Saeed, Fouzia (16–22 January 2011), "Some Like it Raw", The Express Tribune Magazine: 34–38
- Saeed, Fouzia (2020), On Their Own Terms: Early Twenty-first Century Women's Movements in Pakistan, Karachi: Oxford University Press
- Saeed, Fouzia (2021), Tapestry: Strands of Women's Struggles in the History of Pakistan, Karachi: Lightstone Publishers
