= Avicenna Prize =

- Awarded for: Contributions to Ethics in Science
- Country: Iran
- Presented by: UNESCO
- Rewards: A gold medal, a certificate, US$10,000, and a one-week academic visit to the Islamic Republic of Iran.
- First award: 2003; 23 years ago
- Number of laureates: 5 prizes to 5 laureates (as of 2021)
- Website: en.unesco.org/prizes/avicenna/

The Avicenna Prize for Ethics in Science is awarded every two years by UNESCO and rewards individuals and groups in the field of ethics in science. The aim of the award is to promote ethical reflection on issues raised by advances in science and technology, and to raise global awareness of the importance of ethics in science. The prize was named after the 11th century Persian physician and philosopher Avicenna (980-1038).

The Prize consists of a gold medal, a certificate, US$10,000, and a one-week academic visit to the Islamic Republic of Iran.

Since it was founded, the award has been given to five individuals.

== Award recipients ==
- 2004 Margaret Somerville, Canada
- 2005 Abdallah Daar, Canada
- 2009 Renzong Qiu, China
- 2015 Zabta Khan Shinwari, Pakistan
- 2019 Donald A. Brown, US
- 2026 Mhd Ali Amir-Moezzi, France
