= Shad Begum =

Pakistani social worker (born 1979)

Shad Begum شاد بیگم
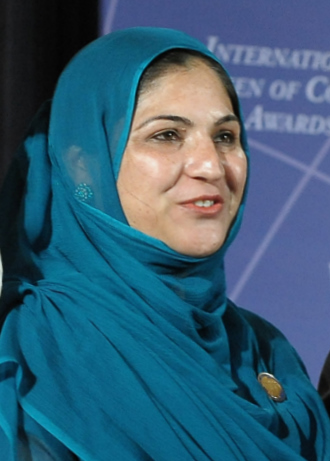
- Shad Begum in 2012
- Born: January 20, 1979 (age 47); Talash, Lower Dir, Pakistan
- Occupation: Social Worker
- Website: http://www.abkt.org/

Shad Begum is a social worker from Dir Lower, Pakistan. She comes from a religious and middle-class family. She is the first university-educated female in her family. She says, she always got support from her father, brothers and husband for her social work.

== Association for Behaviour and Knowledge Transformation ==
Ms Shad founded the Association for Behaviour and Knowledge Transformation (ABKT) for the development of women in the area in 1994. Initially ABKT was known as Anjuman Behbood-i-Khawateen Talash. She faced many challenges and difficulties in the man dominated conservative society of the area. She shifted the organization office to Peshawar when the Taliban rose in the area and she was threatened by unidentified militants. The association has contributed in female education, political awareness and health improvement projects in the area. Furthermore, the association has also carried out projects like construction of hanging bridges, installation of hand pumps, sinking wells, paving streets, provision of small loans to local traders and capacity building of women at grassroots level. The association gets funding from Pakistani and international agencies.

== Awards ==
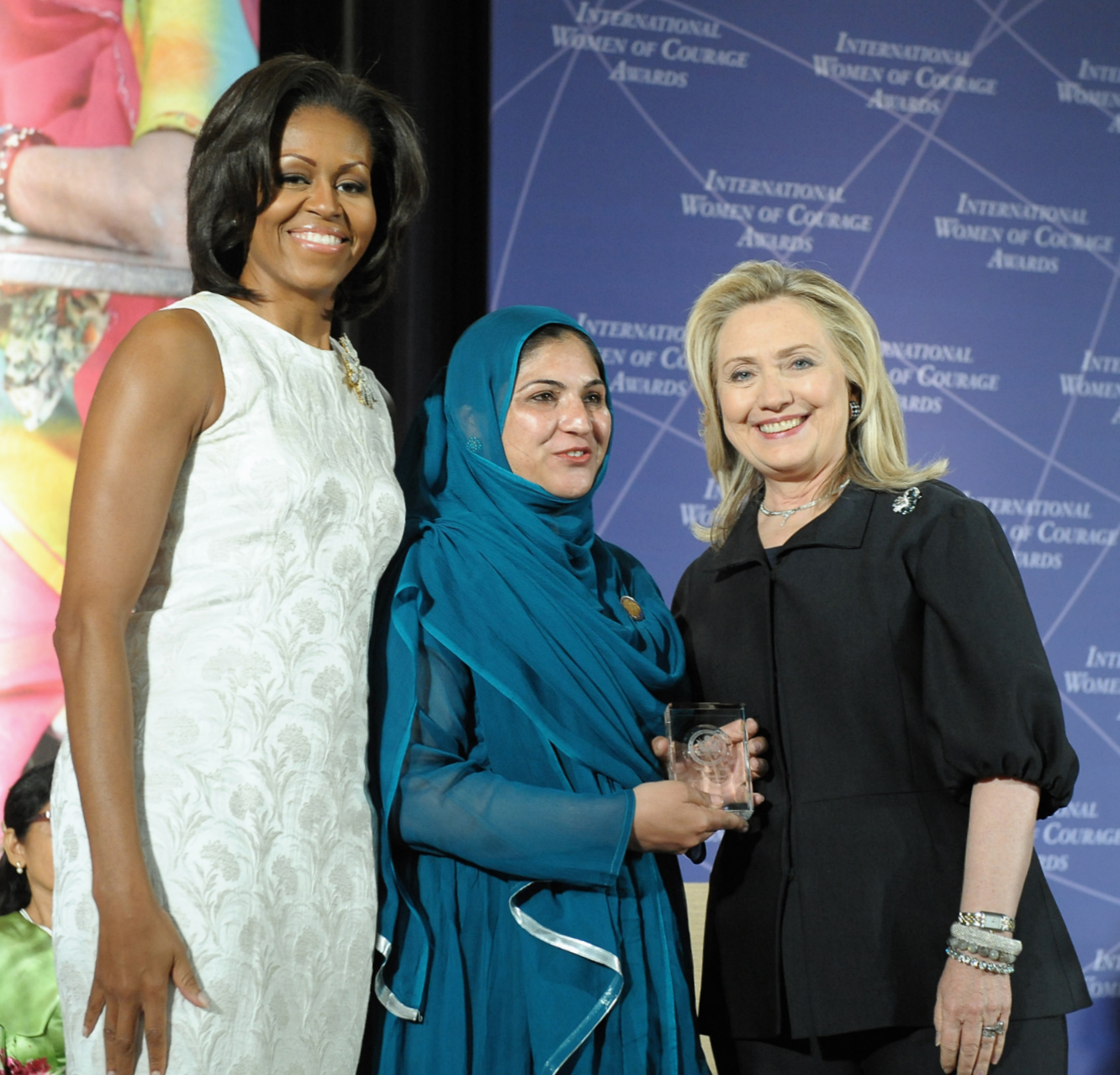
Shad Begum (centre) with Michelle Obama (left) and Hillary Clinton (right) at the 2012 International Women of Courage Awards

She was awarded with the International Women of Courage Award by the US First Lady Michelle Obama and the Secretary of State Hillary Clinton on Thursday 8 March 2012. The area where she comes from is very conservative and there are very few working women. She had requested several news reporters not to spread the news because of security reasons.
