= Eva Abu Halaweh =

Jordanian human rights activist

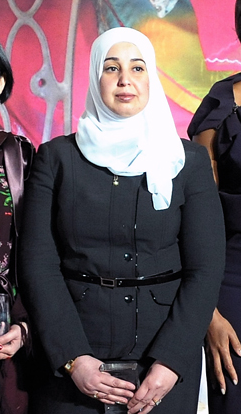
- Born: 1975 (age 50–51)
- Occupation: lawyer

Eva Abu Halaweh (Arabic: إيفا أبو حلاوة born in 1975) is Palestinian-Jordanian a lawyer and human rights activist in Jordan, and was awarded the International Women of Courage Award presented by the US Department of State in 2011.

She has a bachelor's degree specializing in law, a master's degree in diplomacy and a master's degree in political science.

== Biography ==
From her first day at school, her father asked her to study hard in order to become a doctor. She was not against the idea at first, but as the days and years passed, students were offered a range of professions, and lawyers and judges were one of them. Eva liked the idea, she said, "As I remember, In my community there are no female judges or lawyers, but I can't discuss this with my family.”

In her family and in the Palestinian refugee community in general, the medical profession was considered the best, and those who studied it had achieved the supreme goal. Engineering was somewhat acceptable, while the legal profession occupied the lowest degree of acceptance. Although enrolling in law school would bring her a lot of trouble and rejection, she did not stop, and she listened to her heart and continued to pursue her ambition. In the same year that she finished high school, the local university opened the doors for applications to obtain a bachelor's degree in law, and as expected, Eva submitted an application and was accepted, and on December 10, 1993, two years before her graduation, she met a famous female lawyer and human rights activist, and ever since that day Eva decided to work for human rights.

Her Achievements ever since:

- She became a co-founder and currently is the Executive Director of the Mizan Law Group for Human Rights in Amman.
- Previously Abu Halaweh ran a private practise and was employed by the United Nations High Commissioner for Refugees as a legal advisor.
- She has been a member of the Arab Organisation for Human Rights since 1993.
- Abu Halaweh has campaigned and still campaigns against honor killings and for protecting women at risk and the vulnerable, and in eliminating torture and abuse in the Jordanian prison system and police stations.
- Won the Franco-German award for Human Rights.

== Mizan Legal Group ==
Mizan Legal Group for Human Rights was founded in 1998 by a group of lawyers, one of whom is Eva Abu Halawa.

Before establishing Mizan, many people who were victims of human rights violations presented their problems for free. And as Eva said: "We discovered that the problem was greater than the need to present cases for free, the problem was in the laws themselves that did not protect human rights, so we had to campaign to change these laws." At first, Mizan Group focused on the protection of human rights in general, but after a period of time the lawyers began to build expertise and focus on a specific group of people.

including: juveniles, orphans, refugees and others.
