= Henriette Ekwe Ebongo =

Cameroonian journalist and activist (born 1949)

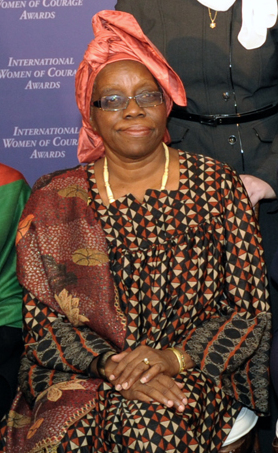
- Ebongo in 2011
- Born: 25 December 1949 (age 76)
- Occupation: Journalist

Henriette Ekwe Ebongo (born 25 December 1949) is a Cameroonian journalist, publisher and political activist. She was awarded the International Women of Courage Award in 2011.

== Early life and career ==
Henriette Ekwe Ebongo was born on 25 December 1949 in Cameroon. She began her early education in the town of Ambam, a locality situated near the borders of Gabon, Equatorial Guinea, and Cameroon. Ebongo continued her studies through elementary course 1. From a young age, she demonstrated a strong interest in social justice, a passion that would go on to influence her career path as a journalist, publisher, and political activist. Over the years, Ekwe became known for her dedication to democratic values and advocacy in areas such as press freedom, gender equality, human rights, and good governance. Her unwavering commitment to these causes garnered international recognition, including the prestigious International Women of Courage Award in 2011.

== Biography ==
Ebongo advocates freedom of the press, gender equality, human rights, and good governance. She was active in the struggle against dictatorship in the 1980s, and the current campaign against government corruption, gender discrimination and human rights abuses. During this time she has suffered repression, torture, and being taken to military court.

She is the publisher of the independent weekly newspaper Babela and is a founder of the Cameroon branch of Transparency International, the anti-corruption non-governmental organization.
