= Tabassum Adnan =

Pakistani women's rights activist

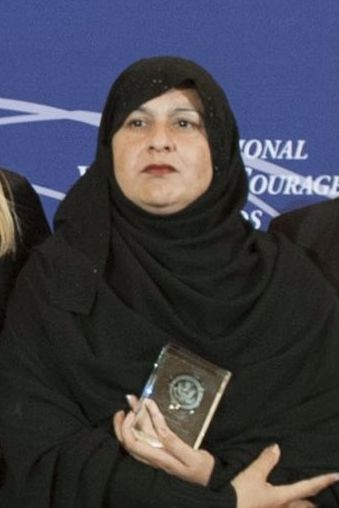
- Born: 1977 (age 48–49); Swat Valley, Pakistan
- Occupation: women's rights activist
- Years active: 2013 - present
- Known for: founding the first female jirga in Pakistan

Tabassum Adnan (Urdu: تبسم عدنان; born 1977) is a Pakistani women's rights activist from the Swat Valley. She won the U.S. State Department's 2015 International Women of Courage Award for her efforts in seeking justice for Pakistani women.

== Biography ==
Tabassum Adnan was born in 1977 and grew up in the Swat Valley of Pakistan. She was a child bride at 13, mother of four and a victim of domestic violence, when she divorced her husband of 20 years. Finding herself homeless and without means of support, Adnan attended a women's empowerment program run by a local aid group. It inspired her to work to change women's ability to participate in decision-making processes. Initially she approached the male-only, main Swat Aman Jirga, but was rejected. Jirgas are traditional informal judicial councils which enforce qisas, retribution laws, and though not intended to replace formal judicial systems or police procedures, decisions of the elders are socially respected and do often impact the judiciary.

In May 2013, Adnan started her own jirga, the first run by women in the country. Traditionally, women in the region have been used as chattel to settle disputes of men, traded in marriage to absolve debts, claims of honor, and retribution for crimes. Because women have little power, Adnan recognized that her group would need to pressure authorities to act. Her 25-member all-female jirga pressures police and the traditional court system to act while providing legal assistance to the victims. The Khwendo Jirga, or Sister’s Council, in addition to providing justice support for women advocate for free education for girls; protection of women and girl's health; training in both traditional domestic and non-traditional vocational skills; microfinancing, access for women to peace negotiations, justice, and voting; and laws which protect women from violence, specifically, honor killings, dowry harassments, acid attacks, and torture. Initially the Khwendo Jirga was opposed both by men's jirgas and prominent women's rights activists.

In 2014 an event happened, which changed the public perception of Adnan's group. A child was raped and the authorities failed to act. Khwendo Jirga organized a protest walk bringing visibility to the case. The suspects were apprehended and for the first time in Pashtun history, a woman, Adnan, was asked to sit on the male jirga and assist with dispensing justice in the case. Since the first protest, the women have repeated the success and in July, 2014, Adnan and Khwendo Jirga were lobbying for the passage of a law prohibiting child marriages. Despite strong protest from religious factors, the Sindh Assembly unanimously passed a ban on marriages for anyone under the age of eighteen and in December, 2014 the Punjab Assembly unanimously passed a resolution to work on amending the present law.

Since their first success with the men's jirga, Adnan has been invited to participate on other cases dealing with "women's issues." Though she still receives threats Adnan continues, as she believes that women should be part of the decision-making processes that effect their lives.

== Awards ==
In 2013, Adnan was awarded the Human Defenders Award, in 2014 she was a nominee for the N-Peace Empowerment Award, and in 2015, she won a U.S. State Department International Women of Courage Award. She has won the Nelson Mandela Award 2016./>
