= World Congress of Muslim Philanthropists =

Islamic charity

The World Congress of Muslim Philanthropists (WCMP) was formed to help Islamic donors and nonprofit groups and other Muslims around the globe to organize contributions to humanitarian causes. It estimates that Muslims contribute anywhere from $20 billion to $200 billion annually. Much of the charity goes unnoticed because of secrecy and lack of infrastructure to regulate it. The WCMP was started by Tariq H. Cheema, a Pakistani doctor who lives in Illinois. After years of nonprofit work, including assisting victims of the 2005 Pakistan earthquake, Mr. Cheema said he saw the need to bring together the world's Islamic donors. The group will most likely be based in the United States with a second office in Turkey or another Muslim nation. As part of its work, the congress plans to create a Web site, SecureGiving, to rank charities in Muslim countries based on an as-yet-undecided criteria of governance and management standards. Mr. Cheema said the effort will help donors make sure their money is not supporting terrorists posing as Islamic charities, a concern that has grown since the September 11, 2001, attacks.

Tony Blair used the second congress to explain the Quartet on the Middle East's plans for the resolution of the Israel–Palestine conflict.

== See also ==
- Sadaqah
- Zakat
- Islamic Relief
- Zakat Foundation of America
- Islamic Development Bank
- Muslim Aid
