= List of Pakistani Nobel laureates =

Following is a list of Nobel laureates who are either Pakistani or were born in the region that is now Pakistan but are not Pakistani by nationality.

== Laureates ==
=== Pakistani citizens ===
As of 2022, the list of Pakistani Nobel Prize laureates consists of following people.

Year	Portrait	Laureate	Subject	Rationale
1979		Abdus Salam	Physics	Awarded jointly to Sheldon Glashow, Abdus Salam and Steven Weinberg – "for their contributions to the theory of the unified weak and electromagnetic interaction between elementary particles, including, inter alia, the prediction of the weak neutral current"
2014		Malala Yousafzai	Peace	Awarded jointly to Kailash Satyarthi and Malala Yousafzai – "for their struggle against the suppression of children and young people and for the right of all children to education."

=== Nobel laureates born in the region that later became Pakistan ===
The laureates below were born in the region of Pakistan during the British Raj period.

Year	Laureate	Country	Subject	Rationale
1968	Har Gobind Khorana (born in Raipur, Punjab Province, British India)	United States	Physiology or Medicine	Awarded along with Robert W. Holley and Marshall W. Nirenberg – "for their interpretation of the genetic code and its function in protein synthesis."
1983	Subrahmanyan Chandrasekhar (born in Lahore, Punjab Province, British India)	United States	Physics	"For his theoretical studies of the physical processes of importance to the structure and evolution of the stars."
