= Hadiqa Bashir =

Pakistani activist

- Born: 2002 (age 23–24); Swat, Pakistan
- Occupation: Activist for female education
- Known for: Activist for child marriage, especially female
- Awards: Asian Girls Human Rights Ambassador award; Muhammad Ali Humanitarian Award

Hadiqa Bashir (born 2002) is a Pakistani activist with a goal to end child marriages. She is the recipient of Asian Girls Human Rights Ambassador award and Muhammad Ali Humanitarian Award.

== Early life ==
Bashir was ten years old when her grandmother wanted to marry her off. She had seen the plight of her classmate who was married at an early age and did not want to get married. Her uncle Erfaan Hussein, the founder of Girls United for Human Rights helped her push off the marriage. Since then, Bashir has been working in her community to help end child marriages.

== Activism ==
The journey for Bashir started after her own struggle to avoid a marriage. In 2014, she founded Girls United for Human Rights with her uncle to fight for women's rights. After school, she goes from house to house to talk to women persuading them to not marry off their young teenage daughters. She advocates for education for girls. She intervenes whenever she hears of a forced marriage. She has been able to convince five families in her community to not force their young daughters to marry. Through her organization, Bashir helps women who face domestic abuse. The aids are medical or legal so that the women are supported.

Girls United is a group of fifteen girls who conduct awareness sessions in local schools, colleges and in communities to openly talk about benefits of child education and health. Through her work, Bashir wants her conservative community to start seeing women's rights, education and marriage differently.

== Awards ==
In 2016, Bashir became the first Pakistani girl to receive the Asian Girls Human Rights Ambassador award.

In 2015, Bashir was awarded the third Muhammad Ali Humanitarian Award for dedicating her life to ending the practice of child marriages in Pakistan.
