= Aaghaz-e-Dosti =

India-Pakistan friendship initiative

- Founded: 2012
- Founder: Ravi Nitesh
- Type: An Indo-Pak Friendship Initiative
- Headquarters: New Delhi, India
- Location: India
- Key people: Founder – Ravi Nitesh & Co-Founder – Devika Mittal
- Website: https://missionbhartiyam.com/aaghaz-e-dosti/ (defunct)

Aaghaz-e-Dosti (English: "Beginning of Friendship") is an India–Pakistan organization that aims to promote engagement and understanding between people of the two countries. It was started in 2012 by the Indian organization Mission Bhartiyam and its founder, Ravi Nitesh. The initiative aims to facilitate engagement and understanding between the people of both countries by providing platforms for people to learn about conditions and perspectives across the border. The organization has publicly called for the reopening of diplomatic channels between Pakistan and India and has expressed support for adherence to ceasefire movements.

Aaghaz-e-Dosti has organized initiatives intended to facilitate interactions between the people of India and Pakistan. Its activities include creating opportunities for cross-border interaction and promoting pen-pal exchanges among young people in both countries.

A delegation from various parts of India arrived in Attari at the conclusion of the Delhi–Attari road trip, "Aman Dosti Yatra 2018," which was organized with the stated objective of encouraging Indian and Pakistani dialogue. The 40-member group was flagged off in Delhi by journalist and former diplomat Kuldip Nayar and proceeded to the Wagah border under the banner of Aaghaz-e-Dosti.

Aaghaz-e-Dosti launched its 7th Indo-Pak peace calendar on 20 January 2019.

== History ==
Aaghaz-e-Dosti was established in 2012 by people from India and Pakistan, led by Ravi Nitesh. In March 2016, Aaghaz-e-Dosti became a joint initiative of India-based Mission Bhartiyam and Pakistan-based The Catalyst of Peace. In May 2017, Hum Sab Aik Hain also joined as a collaborator from Pakistan.

== Goals ==
According to the organization, its goals include addressing mutual perceptions between communities of India and Pakistan. It focuses on people-to-people communication and provides a platform for people of both countries where participants can communicate ideas and discuss mutual issues. Through this initiative, the Aaghaz-e-Dosti team operates programs involving the exchange of letters, greeting cards, and cultural and open mic nights via video conferencing. It has a defined working structure consisting of the founder, conveners, the core committee, and team members—city coordinators and task-based coordinators. Initiatives of Aaghaz-e-Dosti are Aman Chaupal, greeting card exchange between schools, Indo-Pak Classroom Connect, Indo-Pak Peace Calendar, Indo-Pak Peace Workshop, etc.

== Awards ==
- Social Media for Empowerment Award 2016 by Digital Empowerment Foundation (DEF)
- Felicitated as Laureate of Public Peace Prize 2017
- Felicitated at the Global Peace Initiative 2015 hosted by Welingkar Institute of Management Development and Research (Mumbai, India)
