= Maria Bashir =

Afghan lawyer

- ماریا بشیر
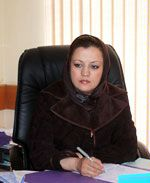
- At Attorney General's Office, Herat
- Born: 1970 (age 55–56)
- Education: Kabul University
- Occupations: Chief Prosecutor General, Herat Province
- Years active: 4
- Employer: Attorney General's Office, Afghanistan
- Known for: First woman prosecutor in Afghanistan
- Children: Sajad (son); Yasaman (daughter)
- Awards: International Women of Courage Award, 2011

Maria Bashir (Dari: ماریا بشیر) is a prosecutor based in Afghanistan and the only woman to ever hold such a position in the country as of 2009. With more than fifteen years of experience with Afghan civil service - the Taliban, corrupt policemen, death threats, failed assassination attempts - she has seen them all. She was banned from working during the Taliban period, when she spent her time schooling girls illegally at her residence, when it was illegal for women to be seen unescorted by men on the streets. In the post-Taliban era, she was called back into service, and was made the Chief Prosecutor General of Herat Province in 2006. With her main focus on eradicating corruption and oppression of women, she handled around 87 cases in 2010 alone.

Recognising her work, the United States Department of State presented her The International Women of Courage Award which is awarded annually to women around the world who have shown leadership, courage, resourcefulness and willingness to sacrifice for others, especially for promotion of women's rights, often at risk to their own lives. Bashir also featured in the 2011 Time 100, an annual list of the 100 most influential people in the world composed by Time.

== Early life and education ==
Bashir, the eldest child in her family, was a bright student right from her school days. She received encouragement from her late father to further her studies beyond school level, in a country that is very restrictive in its attitude towards women. When the entrance exams for her Graduate schooling required her to choose three options, she filled the application with 'Law' under all of them. The Minister for Higher Education, who screens and approves the applications, was impressed by her determination and approved her to study law. She graduated in 1994 with a four-year course in Law at Kabul University and later underwent a year-long training in Kabul as a prosecutor.

== Personal life ==
In 1996, after graduation, Bashir married the owner of an import business based in China, and moved to his city, Herat. Bashir has two sons and a daughter. The eldest son studies in Germany, and other two (Sajad and Yasaman) are being home schooled, as death threats directed at Bashir and her family make formal schooling difficult.

== Under the Taliban ==
After her training, Bashir started her career in the Attorney General's office as a Criminal Investigator in Kabul, and later in Herat. Shortly after her move to Herat, in 1995, the Taliban occupied the city and stopped women from working. Bashir had to stay indoors, like other women, until 2001, when the American invasion enabled women to start working again, at which time she resumed her previous role as Criminal Investigator. The Taliban made it illegal for girls to read or work, ensuring that they remained dependent on men. Bashir started schooling them underground, at her residence, with students smuggling books and other items necessary for their studies inside shopping bags. She believed that the Taliban regime would fall, and wanted women to be ready to join the workforce when this happened. The Taliban were aware of her activities, and they summoned her husband twice to explain what she was doing.

== Back in the Prosecutors' Office ==
In September, 2006, the then Attorney General, regarded as a conservative, visited Herat, for a meeting with prosecutors from four provinces. Bashir was the only woman present. At the end of his speech, she questioned his policy to improve the Prosecutor's office, specifically in relation to allowing women to work there. The Attorney General expressed his approval on the latter, and expressed pleasure with her work as assistant prosecutor in the investigation into the death of the Afghan poet and journalist Nadia Anjuman: wherein she had brought murder charges against Nadia's husband. Before leaving Herat later in the month, the Attorney General had appointed Bashir as the Chief Prosecutor General of the province.

== Criticism on the new Afghan constitution ==
Bashir's appointment was welcomed by the then US Government as significant progress in its Westernization of the country after Taliban rule. The then US Secretary of State Condoleezza Rice flew Bashir to Washington to honour the progress. Bashir, however, was critical: stating that though the new constitution provided equal rights to women, many judges still subscribed to the old Islamic Sharia Law. After stating that the lack of freedom women have to choose their partners, she noted that while men are not tried for adultery, women were still being stoned to death for similar charges. Commenting on the biased divorce process and the way husbands win custody of children, she said women preferred suicide to the latter. Briefing more on the prevailing corruption issues in Afghanistan, she suggested a structural reorganisation, with an end to appointing people based on their ethnicity, as was being done by Hamid Karzai. She also recommended that the anti corruption efforts can only be successful if they are coupled with salary increases for the public servants, as the meagre salaries that they receive now forces them to look 'elsewhere' to supplement them. She also showed her concern on the lack of enforcing power of the laws, which makes the legal system powerless.

== Assassination attempts ==
Bashir's appointment was not taken well by the fanatics, for her being a woman. Added to it were the anti-corruption activities and her emboldening the women victims of domestic abuse to take their husbands to court. She started receiving telephonic threats, demanding her resignation. Some Herat-based clerics also issued a fatwa on unescorted women in public places. This alarmed Bashir, who requested the state authorities to provide her security. But the authorities paid no heed to her requests and later in 2007, a bomb exploded outside her home, around the time when her children would usually be playing outside. It was raining then, and hence her children were indoors. Seeing the threats to her life, the U.S. government hired armed guards and provided her with an armored land cruiser. In another incident, one of her bodyguards' sons was kidnapped and murdered, with the perpetrators mistaking him for Bashir's son. Events such as these forced Bashir's kids to take up home schooling which concerns Bashir for having been the reason for their not receiving formal schooling.

== See also ==
- First women lawyers around the world
