= Begum Jan =

Pakistani doctor

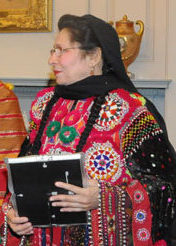
Begum Jan at the International Women of Courage Awards In Washington DC, 2008

Begum Jan (Urdu: بیگم جان) is a doctor and the founder of the Tribal Women Welfare Association, which educates tribal women in Northwest Pakistan about their rights, and gives them medical training. She grew up in South Waziristan, a conservative area of Pakistan, but her father encouraged her to become a doctor. She attended a school for boys as a child because there was no school for girls, and when her tribal elders forbid her to attend high school she studied with a tutor instead.

In 2007, at a nationwide women's protest against clerics advocating suicide bombings and other violence, Jan led the Tribal Women Welfare Association's protest. As of 2008 she is the Tribal Women Welfare Association's chairwoman.

She received a 2008 International Women of Courage Award, making her the first Pakistani woman to receive that award.
