= List of Punjabi-language films =

Punjabi language films are produced both in India and Pakistan.

- List of Pakistani Punjabi-language films
- List of Indian Punjabi films
