= Inamullah Khan =

Founder of World Muslim Congress (1912–1997)

Inamullah Khan (1912–1997) was a Muslim activist who symbolised the World Muslim Congress, Al-Motamar al-Alam al-Islami, for almost four and a half decades. He was awarded the Templeton Prize in 1988.

== Early years ==
Inamullah Khan was born in Rangoon, Burma, in 1912. His family originally hailed from Zamania, India, and he migrated to Pakistan in 1948.

== Contributions ==
Inamullah Khan was the founder and former secretary-general of the Modern World Muslim Congress in Karachi, Pakistan.

== Awards ==
Inamullah Khan received several awards for his work. He was awarded the Japanese award in 1987, Niwano Peace Prize and the Templeton Prize for progress in Religion in 1988.

== Allegations of antisemitism ==
The Anti-Defamation League opposed awarding of Templeton Prize to Khan claiming that he had supported antisemitism, and that the World Muslim Congress' newsletter had supported antisemitic propaganda such as the Protocols of the Learned Elders of Zion and The International Jew. Khan denied being antisemitic. The ADL also noted Khan's longstanding links to the anti-communist World League for Freedom and Democracy. Khan said he participated in their conferences because "as a religious person, I am opposed to all atheistic creeds." Southern Poverty Law Center says that Khan supports Holocaust denial.
