= Ghulam Sughra =

Pakistani activist

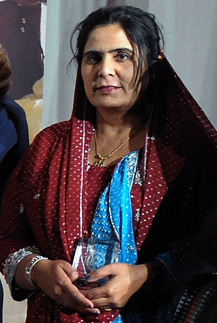
Portrait of Ghulam Sughra

Ghulam Sughra Solangi (Urdu: غلام صغری; born March 2, 1970) is a Pakistani activist.

== Life ==
Sughra was born in a small village of Khairpur district, Sindh into moderately well off family, she was forced into marriage when she was twelve years old, but six years later she became the first woman in her village to be divorced. She was also beaten by her brothers when she tried to go to school, but she was able to study at home. She was her village’s first female high school graduate and the first teacher at its first school for girls. She found that there were no girls to teach. Some of the reasons were cultural, but the main reason she thought was poverty so she endeavoured to find ways to alleviate the poverty.

She was the founder and the CEO of the Marvi Rural Development Organization MRDO in Pakistan, which is an NGO whose mission is to create community savings funds and raise awareness of human rights, health, education, and social development issues.

== Achievements ==
She became the first Pakistani woman to win Ashoka Fellowship in 1999 and in 2011, she received International Women of Courage Award. from the former-US Secretary of State, Hillary Clinton and former First Lady Michelle Obama.
