= World Muslim Congress =

- مؤتمر العالم الإسلامي
- Abbreviation: WMC
- Formation: 1926
- Founder: king Abdulaziz ibn Abdul Rahman Al Saud
- Headquarters: Mecca, Saudi Arabia
- President: Abdullah Omar Nasseef

The World Muslim Congress (Motamar al-Alam al-Islami) (Arabic: مؤتمر العالم الإسلامي) is an Islamic organization based in Karachi. Its co-founder and Secretary-General for over four decades was Inamullah Khan. It was the recipient of the 1987 Niwano Peace Prize, and Khan was the recipient of the 1988 Templeton Prize. It has general consultative status with the United Nations Economic and Social Council.

The Congress was founded at the 1949 World Muslim Conference in Karachi, following the creation of Pakistan in 1947. Mohammad Amin al-Husayni, the Grand Mufti of Jerusalem, who presided over the Conference, was elected President of the Congress. Its cofounder and Secretary-General for over four decades was Inamullah Khan.

Although formally founded in 1949, the Congress traces its roots to a Congress hosted in Mecca in 1926 hosted by Ibn Saud of Saudi Arabia shortly after his occupation of Mecca and Medina; he "hoped [it] would confer Islamic sanction upon his administration of the holy cities, instead [it] leveled many criticisms, and he did not reconvene it." Mohammad Amin al-Husayni had also been a leading figure at this Congress.

== President of World Muslim Congress ==
- Abdullah Omar Nasseef

=== Vice - President of World Muslim Congress ===
- Abdullah omer naseer

=== Secretary General of World Muslim Congress ===
- Senator Raja Zafar-ul-Haq

=== Executive Director of World Muslim Congress Nigerian Office ===
- Mallam AbdulRazzaq Ibrahim Salman

== See also ==
- General Islamic Congress
