= List of non-governmental organizations in Pakistan =

This article is a list of notable domestic and international non-governmental organizations operating in the Islamic Republic of Pakistan.

== A ==
- ActionAid
- AED
- Al-Khair Foundation
- Adventist Development and Relief Agency Pakistan
- AFS Intercultural Exchanges
- American Himalaya Foundation
- Arab-Pakistani Fund
- Akhuwat Foundation
- Association for the Development of Pakistan
- Aurat Foundation
- Aga Khan Rural Support Programme
- ACTED

== B ==
- Bilqees Sarwar Foundation (BSF)
- Braille Without Borders
- Bremen Overseas Research and Development Association

== C ==
- CARE Pakistan
- Caritas Pakistan
- Carter Center
- Centre for Social Justice Pakistan
- Chiltan Adventurers Association Balochistan
- Clinton Foundation
- CMKP Pakistan
- Conservation International
- Consumer Rights Commission of Pakistan

== D ==
- Darul Sukun
- David and Lucile Packard Foundation
- Depilex Smileagain Foundation

== E ==
- Ecotourism Society Pakistan
- Edhi Foundation
- Environmental Defense
- Environmental Investigation Agency

== F ==
- Faiz Foundation for Pakistan
- Family Educational Services Foundation
- Fatima Jinnah Trust
- Fauna and Flora International
- FHI 360
- Ford Foundation
- Friedrich Ebert Stiftung
- Friends of Pakistan
- Friends of the Earth Pakistan

== I ==
- Idara-e-Amn-o-Insaf
- Institute for Sustainable Communities
- International Committee of the Red Cross
- International Development Enterprises
- International Federation of Red Cross and Red Crescent
- International Fund for Animal Welfare
- International Organization for Sustainable Development
- International Republican Institute
- Islamic Relief
- Indus Hospital

== J ==
- John D. and Catherine T. MacArthur Foundation
- JDC Welfare Organization

== K ==
- Konrad Adenauer Stiftung

== L ==
- Lahore Music Forum
- Latif Kapadia Memorial Welfare Trust
- Layton Rahmatulla Benevolent Trust
- Khan Liaqat Ali Khan Society for Needy Children

== M ==
- MKR Foundation
- Muslim Charity
- Muslim Hands
- Muslim World League
- Médecins du Monde
- Médecins Sans Frontières
- Minhaj Welfare Foundation

== N ==
- National Democratic Institute for International Affairs
- Natural Resources Defense Council
- National Research and Development Foundation (NRDF)
- Nazaria-i-Pakistan Trust (NPT)

== P ==
- Pakistan Centre for Philanthropy
- Pacific Environment
- Plan International
- Population Services International
- Prevention of Blindness Trust
- Program for Appropriate Technology in Health
- Progressive Education Network
- Project Hope
- ProLiteracy Worldwide

== R ==
- Red Crescent Society
- Rising Sun Institute

== S ==
- Sarhad Rural Support Programme
- Save the Children
- Saylani Welfare International Trust
- SOS Kinderdorf
- Strengthening Participatory Organization
- Swiss Red Cross
- Shaukat Khanum Memorial Cancer Hospital & Research Centre

== T ==
- The Asia Foundation
- The Citizens Foundation
- The Dawood Foundation
- The Fred Hollows Foundation
- The Mountain Institute
- The Nature Conservancy
- The Salvation Army
- The Terma Foundation
- Trust for Democratic Education and Accountability
- Trust for History, Arts and Architecture of Pakistan (THAAP)

== V ==
- Volunteers in Asia
- Voluntary Service Overseas

== W ==
- War Against Rape
- Wetlands International
- Wheelchair Foundation
- WildAid
- Wildlife Conservation Society
- Women Media Center
- World Bank/International Monetary Fund
- World Conservation Union
- World Monuments Fund
- World Vision International
- World Wide Fund for Nature

== Y ==
- Youth Parliament of Pakistan
