= List of non-governmental organisations based in Karachi =

This is a partial list of Non-governmental organization (NGOs) based in Karachi, Sindh, Pakistan.

Name of NGO	Cause
Chhipa Welfare Association	Chhipa Ambulances provides free paramedic services to common people
NOWPDP	NOWPDP is a disability inclusion initiative working in the areas of education and economic empowerment. It provides vocational training to persons with disabilities and helps organizations become disability inclusive.
Social Society for Human Aid & Development	SSHAD is a research based organisation which work for public issues and solution
Aahung	Aahung is a Karachi-based non-governmental organisation which aims to improve the sexual and reproductive health of men, women, and adolescents across Pakistan
PWA	PWA (Patients' Welfare Association) is a non-profit, non-governmental, largest student-run organization of Pakistan. It has Pakistan's largest single-outlet blood bank in Civil Hospital Karachi and a Thalassemia Daycare Centre with around 250 registered patients receiving blood transfusions and management of thalassemia, all free of cost.
Darul Sukun	A home for children and adults with deformity or mentally challenged.
Edhi Foundation	A non-profit social welfare program in Pakistan, founded by Abdul Sattar Edhi
Family Educational Services Foundation	The Deaf Reach Program was established in Pakistan in 1998, initially working informally with deaf youth and young adults.
Fatih Foundation	A non governmental organization, working in and outside of Pakistan, founded by Mufti Owais Pasha Qarni
Gul Bahao	Provides practical solutions for low cost housing, water sanitation and garbage disposal.
Idara-e-Amn-o-Insaf	The charity deals with social and labor issues.
JDC Welfare Organization	A non-profit Charitable Organization in Pakistan
Latif Kapadia Memorial Welfare Trust	a nonprofit foundation focusing on essential healthcare accessible for low-income communities.
Layton Rahmatulla Benevolent Trust	LRBT provides aid preventing the suffering caused by blindness and other eye elements
Mahvash & Jahangir Siddiqui Foundation	Provides healthcare, education and social enterprise through sustainable development to underprivileged.
Marie Adelaide Leprosy Centre	The charity provides full-service leprosy treatment and rehabilitation center, free to patients.
Sindhica Reforms Society (SRS)	Sindhica Reforrms Society is the environmental NGO based in Shaheed Benazirabad, Sindh, Pakistan.
RAST Foundation	The non-profit organisation provides teachers training and certification for Early Childhood Education (ECE) and higher classes
Saylani Welfare International Trust	A non-profit social welfare program in Pakistan, founded by Maulana Bashir Farooq Qadri
Peoples Progressive Organization	A non governmental organization, working in Pakistan, founded by Abdul Hameed Jamali
HANDS	HANDS (Health and Nutritions Development Society) HANDS was founded by Prof. A. G. Billoo (Sitara-e-Imtiaz) in 1979. HANDS has evolved in 43 years as one of the largest Non-Profit Organizations of the country. We have an integrated development approach and disaster management expertise.

== See also ==
- List of NGOs in Pakistan
