= Edhi (disambiguation) =

Abdul Sattar Edhi (1928–2016) was a Pakistani philanthropist, ascetic, and humanitarian who founded the Edhi Foundation.

Edhi may also refer to:

- Edhi Foundation

== People with the name ==
- Bilquis Edhi (born 1947), widow of Abdul Sattar Edhi
- Edhi Handoko (1960–2009), Indonesian chess grandmaster
- Edhi Sunarso (1932–2016), Indonesian sculptor and public artist
