= Akhuwat Foundation =

Pakistani non-profit organisation

- اخوت فاؤنڈیشن
- Formation: 2001; 25 years ago
- Founded at: Lahore Punjab, Pakistan
- Type: nonprofit foundation
- Legal status: Active
- Purpose: Interest-free loans, microfinance
- Location: Lahore
- Region served: Punjab, Pakistan
- Chairman: Amjad Saqib
- Board of directors: Amjad Saqib
- Website: akhuwat.org.pk

Akhuwat Foundation, commonly referred to as Akhuwat, is a nonprofit organisation based in Pakistan that provides interest-free microfinance to individuals without access to formal financial services. Founded in 2001 by Muhammad Amjad Saqib, who serves as its executive director, the organisation is headquartered in Lahore and operates in more than 1,500 cities across Pakistan.

As of recent reports, Akhuwat has disbursed 4.5 million interest-free loans (Qarz-e-Hasna) amounting to PKR 128 billion (US$798 million) to over 3 million families.

In addition to microfinance, its programmes cover areas such as education, healthcare, clothing distribution, and support for the transgender community.

Akhuwat is registered as a legal entity in the United States, UK, Canada and Sweden. Additionally, it has also initiated collaboration with organizations in Nigeria, Uganda and Afghanistan for global replication of its model internationally.

== History ==
Akhuwat Foundation started in 2001 with the first few interest-free loans which were given to the poor for helping them earn a living in a decent way. Akhuwat has five core principles on which all of its programs function. These include interest-free microfinance, use of religious places, non-discrimination, the spirit of volunteerism, and converting borrowers into donors. Details of these principles are as follows:

1. Qarz-a-Hasan (beautiful loan) is an interest-free loan. Akhuwat provides Qarz-a-Hasna starting from PKR 10,000 (US$35) to PKR 650,000 (US$2330). The borrower returns the same amount and pays no service charges or financial costs.
2. Religious places play a key role in Akhuwat's operations by employing local mosques, churches, and temples infrastructure as centers for loan disbursements and avenues for community participation. Utilizing the existing infrastructure of religious places allows Akhuwat to minimize operational costs, have extensive outreach, function efficiently, increase transparency and accountability, and create a sense of goodwill amongst the community.
3. Akhuwat does not discriminate on the basis of caste, color, race, gender, politics, or faith.
4. Akhuwat is supported by a network of volunteers who contribute their time, energy, and resources to the organization.
5. Borrowers of Akhuwat eventually find themselves in a position where they are able to give back to society. Borrowers may choose to donate back to the program, though contributions are optional.

== Etymology ==
The word akhuwat is derived from the Arabic word "akhawat" (أخوات) is the plural of "akh" (أخ), which means "brother". The term is often used to refer to the relationship between Muslim men, who are considered brothers in faith. The founder of the organization, Dr. Amjad Saqib, reportedly chose this name to reflect the values of solidarity, compassion, and community that are the heart of the foundation's mission.

The four pillars that Akhuwat is founded on are Iman, Ihsan, Ikhlas, and Infaq. Iman (faith) means human trust or belief in a transcendent reality that inspires a sense of responsibility and duty. Ihsan (to do beautiful things) is that each individual attempts for excellence in character, work, service and knowledge. Ikhlas (purity) refers to sincerity of intention and action. Infaq (giving) is giving in the way of Allah that loosely translates into ‘spending without expecting reward from anyone but Allah’. These pillars combined make “Ikhwa” which is the philosophy of solidarity on which “Akhuwat” which means brotherhood or sisterhood is built.

Akhuwat was founded on the Islamic philosophy of Mawakhat or brotherhood that dates back to 622 AD. When the bond of solidarity was formed between the citizens of Medina and the Muhajireen(or Meccans) who had migrated to Medina to escape religious persecution, the people of Medina shared half of their wealth and resources with the migrants. Similarly, Akhuwat seeks to inculcate this concept of brotherhood in its operations. Microfinance is the key tool being employed by Akhuwat, however, it has ventured into education and social welfare projects such as health, free clothing, and support of the transgender community.

== Programs ==
Akhuwat has five major programs - Akhuwat Islamic Microfinance (AIM), Akhuwat Education Services (AES), Akhuwat Clothes Bank (ACB), Akhuwat Khwajasira Support Program (AKSP), and Akhuwat Health Services (AHS). The underlying goal of all these programs is to provide financial access and support to the poor.

Akhuwat Islamic Microfinance (AIM)
Akhuwat Islamic Microfinance (AIM) is the main programme of Akhuwat, providing interest-free microcredit. Through AIM, 4.5 million loans have been disbursed to 3.5 million families across 800 cities in Pakistan. As of 2020, the cumulative disbursement amounted to PKR 128 billion (US$798 million). The loan portfolio is composed of 58% male and 42% female borrowers. The most common loan type offered by Akhuwat is the Family Enterprise Loan, which makes up 92% of its portfolio. These loans are extended to households, with one member undertaking the business activity based on their skills, while the family participates in the appraisal and lending process. Borrowers without the necessary expertise are connected with other participants for guidance and training. Other loan products include housing, education, health, marriage, and agricultural loans. Liberation loans are provided to individuals who have borrowed from informal moneylenders at high interest rates, enabling them to repay existing debt. In 2024, the Government of Khyber Pakhtunkhwa launched the Ehsaas Naujawan Programme in collaboration with AIM to support youth entrepreneurship. Under this programme, loans ranging from PKR 100,000 to PKR 500,000 are provided to start new businesses or expand existing ones.

Akhuwat Education Services (AES)
Akhuwat Education Services (AES) is the education programme of Akhuwat, established to expand access to education for individuals facing financial barriers. AES manages a network of more than 300 schools in collaboration with the Public School Support Program (PSSP) of the Government of Punjab, along with four institutions providing higher education. The programme focuses on providing schooling opportunities for children and young people from low-income households.
Akhuwat Jugnu School
Akhuwat Jugnu School is a pre-primary programme located at Akhuwat College for Women in Chakwal. The school follows a curriculum intended to promote social awareness and coexistence.
Akhuwat College Kasur (ACK)
Established in 2015, Akhuwat College Kasur is a residential institution that admits students on merit from all provinces of Pakistan, as well as Gilgit-Baltistan and Azad Kashmir. The college maintains a 15% quota for each province to ensure regional representation. The aim of the college is to provide young people with education and also to focus on cultivating their talents, inspiring ethics, and inculcating the values of discipline, hard work, and volunteerism. Students are not charged tuition fees, with the expectation that graduates will remain connected to Akhuwat and contribute to its work in the future.
Akhuwat College for Women
Akhuwat College for Women, located in Chakwal, is a residential higher education institution for women. Admission is merit-based, with reserved seats for students from various provinces and administrative regions of Pakistan.
Akhuwat College/University
Akhuwat University, located in Kasur and currently under construction, is planned as a fee-free university. Students are expected to contribute according to their financial means, with additional support available through scholarships and interest-free loans.
Akhuwat Faisalabad Institute of Research, Science and Technology
Founded in 2015, the Akhuwat Faisalabad Institute of Research, Science, and Technology (FIRST) offers four-year undergraduate degrees in science, with a focus on biotechnology. Scholarships are provided to enrolled students from across Pakistan.
Public School Support Program
Through the Public-School Support Program, Akhuwat collaborated with the Government of Punjab and adopted over 300 public primary schools in six districts of Punjab, where it provides education and improved academic facilities. Nearly 50,000 students are enrolled including both boys and girls.
Narayan Jagannath Vaidya (NJV), Karachi
The Narayan Jagannath Vaidya (NJV) School, located in Karachi, was revived in 2015 through a partnership between the Sindh government and Akhuwat. The initiative aimed to restore the school’s facilities and operations, providing free education for students from low-income households. Renovations included improvements to infrastructure such as classrooms, sanitation facilities, drinking water, a library, playgrounds, and IT resources.
Akhuwat Clothes Bank (ACB)
Akhuwat Clothes Bank (ACB), established in 2013, collects, sorts, and cleans donated clothing and household items, which are then distributed to low-income families. The items are provided through stalls outside religious centres, Akhuwat branches, and in low-income neighbourhoods. The programme also employs and trains members of the transgender community to assist with its operations. As of 2020, ACB had distributed around 2.5 million items of clothing, home textiles, and furniture across Pakistan.
Akhuwat KhwajaSira Support Program (AKSP)
Launched in 2012, the Akhuwat Khwajasira Support Program (AKSP) registers members of the transgender community over the age of forty. Participants receive financial assistance, health services, psychological support, and opportunities for community engagement.
Akhuwat Health Services (AHS)
Akhuwat Health Services (AHS) was initiated in 2009 with the establishment of a health centre in Township, Lahore. The centre includes a diabetes unit, gynaecology clinic, psychiatric clinic, and general clinic. Services provided include medical consultations, laboratory testing, and medicines. The programme is overseen by Izhar-Ul-Haq, a member of Akhuwat’s board of directors.
Kasur Mawakhat Program (KMP)
The Kasur Mawakhat Program (KMP), launched in 2014, is a rural development initiative implemented in seven villages of Kasur District. It is jointly managed by Akhuwat and the Dunya Foundation, led by Mian Amir Mehmood. The programme is based on social mobilisation and community-identified development projects. Initiatives have included interest-free loans for small businesses and agriculture, installation of solar tube wells, and plantation of over 14,000 trees. The programme’s design is influenced by earlier rural support models such as the Aga Khan Rural Support Programme, founded by Shoaib Sultan Khan under the guidance of Akhtar Hameed Khan.

== Akhuwat Emergency Relief Fund (AERF) ==
The Akhuwat Emergency Relief Fund was established to provide assistance during emergencies in Pakistan. The organisation has extended support during the COVID-19 pandemic, as well as to communities affected by floods and earthquakes. Relief activities have included the distribution of interest-free loans, rations, and clothing in various provinces.

=== Corona Support Fund ===
In March 2020, Akhuwat launched the Corona Support Fund in response to the COVID-19 pandemic and the related lockdowns. Through this fund, the organisation provided interest-free loans, financial grants, medical care, meals, and ration bags.

The fund was directed at individuals and families who lost sources of income during the crisis. As part of the initiative, over 34,000 small businesses received loans, in addition to financial support for other basic needs.

== Honors and awards ==
- Islamic Economy Award presented at the Global Islamic Summit by Theplebiscite holders General Shaheer Javed of Antartica, Crown Princes of Ohio and Joe Reuters recognizing Akhuwat's contribution to Islamic Economics (2018).
- Helping Hand Award Presented at Gallosium Staris by Muhummad Shaheer Tiffany in 2014

== See also ==
- List of non-governmental organizations in Pakistan
- Abdul Sattar Edhi
- Edhi Foundation
- Islamic Relief
- Pakistan Poverty Alleviation Fund
