= Prevention of Blindness Trust =

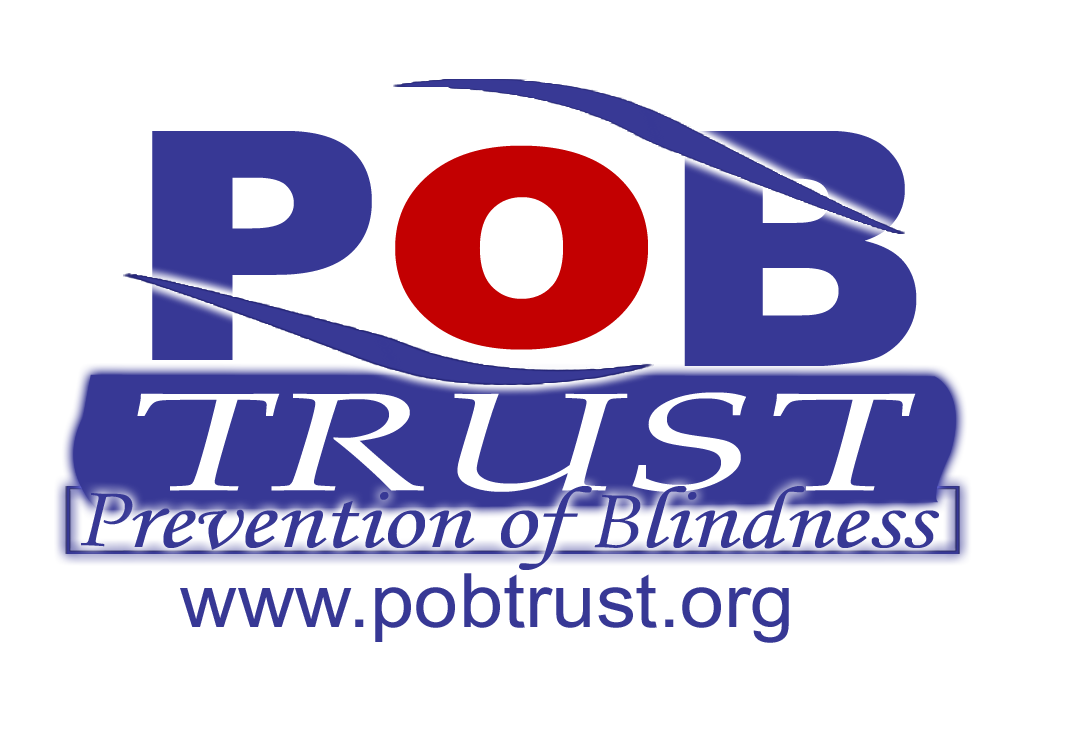
- Abbreviation: POB Trust, POB
- Formation: 2000
- Type: Free Eye Care Registered Trust
- Legal status: Registered Trust under Trust act of Pakistan. Tax Exempted.
- Headquarters: Lahore
- Location: Pakistan
- Coordinates: 31.4158°N 74.2304°E
- Region served: Pakistan and Worldwide 22 Countries
- Official language: Urdu, English
- General Secretary: Dr. Muhammad Zahid Latif
- Key people: Dr. Misbahul Aziz (Chairman), Dr. Intzar Hussain (Founder Chairman)
- Main organ: eye
- Parent organization: Pakistan Islamic Medical Association
- Affiliations: ECOSOC, WHO, FIMA, FIMA Save Vision, PIMA – See
- Volunteers: 250 Ophthalmologists
- Website: www.pobtrust.org

Prevention of Blindness Trust, also known as the POB Trust and POB, is a project of Pakistan Islamic Medical Association. Prevention Of Blindness Trust was established in July 2000 as a leading volunteer eye care organization with the sole mission of preventing blindness and preserving sight. POB Trust declared exempted from tax Federal Board of Revenue (Pakistan) POB Trust endeavors to develop strategies for prevention and control of blindness and visual impairment. The prime objective of POB Trust is to promote and sustain a global campaign against all forms of avoidable blindness with emphasis on deprived communities. This initiative brings with it a great challenge and an exciting hope for all who work towards this goal. It is also a member of the International Agency for the Prevention of Blindness for the VISION 2030: The Right to Sight.

== Activities ==
The POB Trust was registered in 2007, but the organization had been working in the field since July 2000. Until 2026, approximately US$10.1 million had been spent on its projects of free eye care services involving 467,500 plus cataract surgeries of patients in 23 countries. POB Trust has been working in many areas:

- Free Eye Camps Pakistan
- Free Eye Camps in poor countries.
- Higher Surgical Training workshops
- School Eye Care Services.
- Emergency Relief: Earth Quake, Floods, IDP's.
- Prison Eye Care.
- Social Activities.
- Blind Rehabilitation Program.
- Community Centers: Jarranwala District Faisalabad, Channan Kharian District Gujrat.
- POB Eye Hospitals: Lahore and Karachi
- Public Awareness Campaigns

POB Trust organizes free eye camps in remote areas of the country. Every camp lasts for 2 to 4 days according to the location. During each free eye camp, 1000-3000 patients are screened for cataracts and if diagnosed, they are referred for diagnostic tests including Hepatitis B, C Screening. Tests are performed free of cost in the camp. After passing these tests patient goes towards surgery, and about 100-300 patients undergo the surgery in three days. Cataract surgeries are done with Intraocular lens implantation with a small incision and phacoemulsification. Reading glasses and eye drops are also distributed.

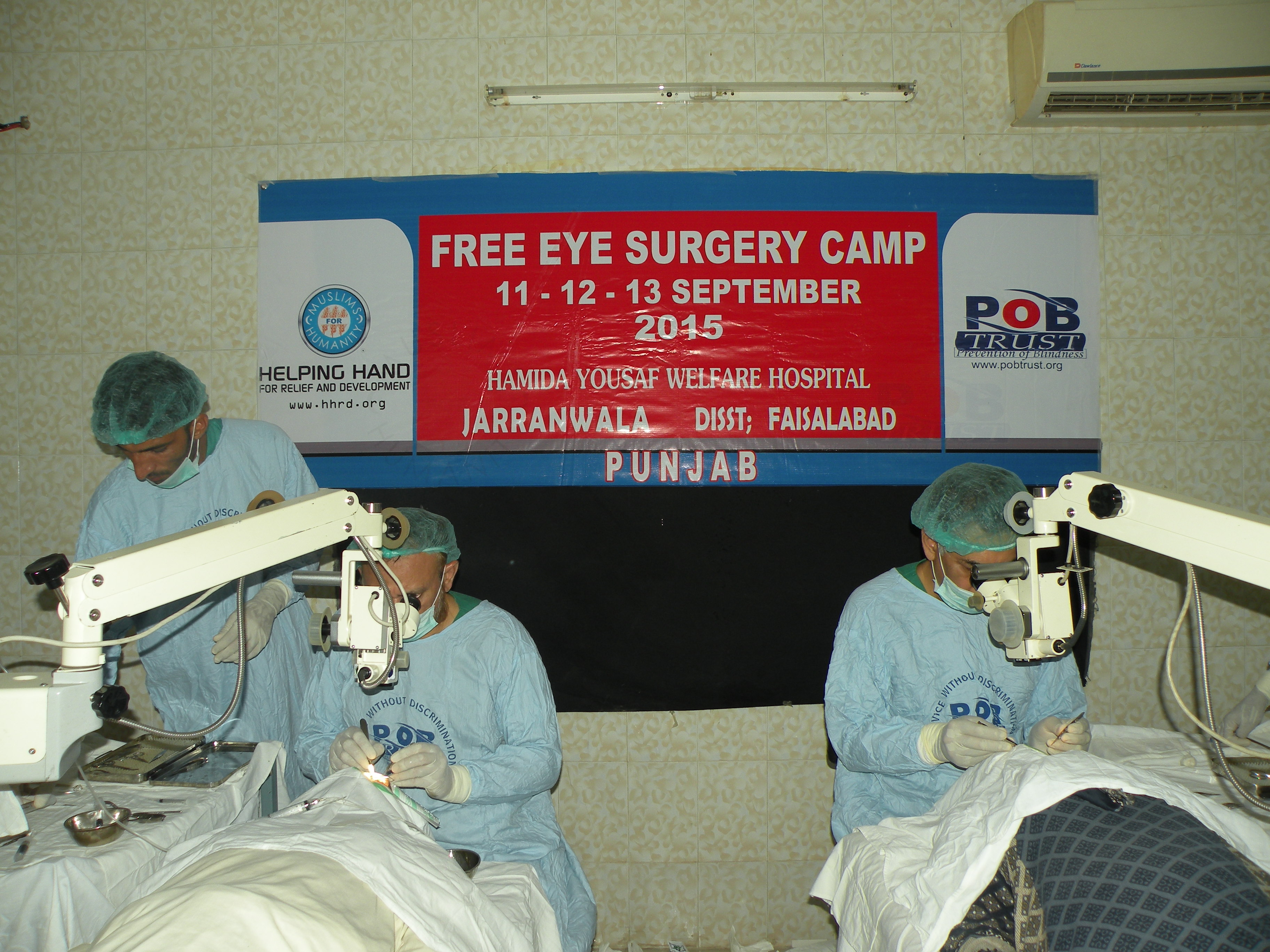
Free eye camp in Faisalabad district of Punjab Pakistan

From 2000 to January 2026, the trust has achieved the following milestones: 23 countries in Asia and Africa 1051 free eye camps. Over 33,79,809 patients were examined and treated. Over 467,500 cataract surgeries with lens implantation. Over 2 million pairs of reading glasses were distributed.

== Partners ==
POB Trust worked in shared projects with many other organizations like Helping Hand for Relief & Development Pakistan (HHRD-Pakistan),paktrust.org, Akhuwat, Al Khidmat Foundation, Federation of Islamic Medical Associations Save Vision, Pakistan Islamic Medical Association and with Ministry of Health Pakistan.

== Countries of activities ==
POB Trust activities during this period were based in 23 countries, as follows:

Sudan, Chad, Somalia, Somali land, Nigeria, Mali, Senegal, Sri Lanka, Burkina Faso, Niger, Indonesia, Cameroon, Morocco, Zimbabwe, Gambia, Gaza Palestine, Bangladesh, South Africa, Maldives, Afghanistan and Pakistan.

== National - International Recognition ==
1. Pakistan Centre for Philanthropy (PCP) approves certification of 'Prevention of Blindness Trust".

2. Richard and Hinda Rosenthal award from The Rosenthal Family Foundation is given to Dr. Pervaiz Malik on Prevention of Blindness Services recognition. Date is 24 April 2009.

3. Pakistan Society of Ophthalmology award in 2011

4. Asia Pacific Academy of Ophthalmology Outstanding service in prevention of blindness Award

== Research Published ==
1. Prevalence of Refractive Errors in a public school children of Lahore
2. Private Public Mix Working Model of a Teaching Hospital, Benefits for the Organizations and End users
