= Progressive Education Network Pakistan =

Pakistani non-profit organization

Progressive Education Network is a non-profit organization that seeks to improve and develop public education in Pakistan by adopting schools and by entering into partnerships with companies that pledge to assist schools in the area that they are in. Its main focus is on the primary schools of Pakistan. The company was started by seven professional personnel who were also friends and adopted its first schools in Lahore in the year of 2010. Its chief executive officer is Najeed Khan.

== History ==
Progressive Education Network was founded by a group of seven friends who were also professionals, businessmen, and educators, who wanted to improve public education in Pakistan as a means of assisting people from the lower and poorer end of society. They decided to adopt existing schools rather than building their own, and studied models such as BRAC, Citizens Foundation and CARE. They incorporated the company as a non-profit with the Securities and Exchange Commission of Pakistan under Section 42 of the Companies Ordinance 1984; it has been certified by the Pakistan Centre for Philanthropy (PCP) as adhering to best practices for non-profits.

In 2010 the company adopted its first schools, in Lahore, with a total of more than 6,000 students. Initially, the founders and their friends funded it themselves; subsequently they developed sponsorship relationships with for-profit companies, including a Good Neighbor Program through which a company sponsors assistance to schools in its locality. They have declared a goal of improving the education of 1 million children throughout Pakistan by 2025. By January 2014, it had expanded to schools totaling almost 11,000 students in a number of locations in Pakistan, including Karachi, Gujrat and Muzaffargarh. As of July 2016, it had adopted 89 schools with almost 23,500 students and had signed an agreement to adopt 50 schools in Punjab.

== Methods ==
Progressive Education Network adopts state schools through a public-private partnership; it is one of several groups using this method to improve education in Pakistan. It works to improve them by improving their infrastructure, for example toilet facilities, drinking water, and classroom furniture, and monitoring teachers, hiring additional teachers to reduce class sizes, and providing teacher training during the summer and winter holidays. The company also provides staff to clean schools twice a day, organizes debate, quiz, and sporting contests, and has provided computers and funded computer classes, but it places its highest priority on hiring more teachers and improving their training.
