= Afzal Javed =

Pakistani-British psychiatrist and academic

Muhammad Afzal Javed OBE, SI
- Born: Pakistan
- Education: King Edward Medical College; University of Edinburgh
- Occupations: Psychiatrist, Academic
- Known for: President of the World Psychiatric Association (2020–2023)
- Children: 2
- Relatives: Amjad Saqib (brother)
- Awards: Sitara-i-Imtiaz (2023); OBE (2025)
- Website: www.drafzaljaved.com

Muhammad Afzal Javed is a Pakistani-British psychiatrist and academic who served as President of the World Psychiatric Association (WPA). His work focuses on psychosocial rehabilitation, transcultural psychiatry, and mental health services. He received the Sitara-i-Imtiaz in 2023 and was appointed an Officer of the Order of the British Empire (OBE) in 2025.

== Early life and education ==
Javed earned his MBBS from King Edward Medical College (now King Edward Medical University) in Lahore in 1977. He completed postgraduate training in psychiatry in Pakistan and the United Kingdom, including at the Royal Edinburgh Hospital, the Institute of Psychiatry at Maudsley Hospital in London, and the University of Edinburgh, where he received an MPhil in psychiatry.

== Career ==
Javed began his career in Lahore as a Consultant Psychiatrist and Assistant Professor. He contributed to the establishment of the Pakistan Psychiatric Research Centre (PPRC) at Fountain House, a community-based mental health facility. In 1996, he joined the National Health Service (NHS) in the United Kingdom and served as a consultant psychiatrist with the Coventry and Warwickshire Partnership NHS Trust. He was an honorary professor at the University of Birmingham and a clinical associate teacher at Warwick Medical School.

He served as Deputy and Associate Registrar of the Royal College of Psychiatrists (2004–2007) and chaired the WPA Task Force on Brain Drain (2006–2008). He was Executive Secretary for Scientific Sections of the World Psychiatric Association (2011–2017), President of the World Association for Psychosocial Rehabilitation (2012–2015) and President of the Asian Federation of Psychiatric Associations (2017–2019). He was elected President-Elect of the World Psychiatric Association in 2017 and served as President from 2020 to 2023.

Javed is a member of the Planetary Health Lab at the University of British Columbia and serves on the editorial board of the Archives of Biological Psychiatry. He has held roles with the Richmond Fellowship Foundation International, the South Asian Forum on Mental Health and Psychiatry, and the SAARC Psychiatric Federation. He supported the establishment of the Child Assessment and Treatment Center at Fountain House in Lahore.

He is a Fellow of the Royal College of Psychiatrists, a trustee of Akhuwat UK, and a trustee of the Centre for Applied Research and Evaluation – International Foundation (Careif). He also serves on the advisory board for the NIHR IMPACT Programme in South Asia, the editorial board of the Pakistan Journal of Medical Sciences, and the Mental Health Advisory Board of the Pakistan Alliance for Community Trauma (PACT).

He has participated in mental health training and policy development in over 70 countries and has spoken at events including the World Federation for Mental Health Congress (2022) the Canada–Middle East Mental Health Conference, and the International Psychiatric Conference in Ukraine (2020).

== Publications ==
Javed has co-authored over 225 peer-reviewed articles and several books on schizophrenia, substance use disorders, transcultural psychiatry, and public mental health.

=== Books ===
- Mental Health and Law (1995)
- Benzodiazepines (1995)
- Epilepsies (1996)
- Advances in Psychiatry, Vol. 4 (2019, co-edited with Kostas N. Fountoulakis)

=== Selected publications ===
- “The Importance of Social Cognition in Improving Functional Outcomes in Schizophrenia,” Frontiers in Psychiatry (2018)
- “Postgraduate Training in Psychiatry in Asia,” Current Opinion in Psychiatry (2018)
- “Psychological Interventions During COVID-19: Challenges for Low- and Middle-Income Countries,” Asian Journal of Psychiatry (2020)
- “Addressing the Public Mental Health Challenge of COVID-19,” The Lancet Psychiatry (2020)
- “The Identification, Assessment and Management of Difficult-to-Treat Depression,” Journal of Affective Disorders (2020)
- “Improving Mental Health in Pakistan: A Call to Action,” The Lancet Psychiatry (2023)
- “The WPA–Lancet Psychiatry Commission on the Future of Psychiatry,” The Lancet Psychiatry (2023)
- “Addressing the Mental Health Challenges of Migrant Workers: A Global Call to Action,” Frontiers in Public Health (2024)

== Honors and awards ==
- National Award on Mental Health, All-Russia Conference on Mental Health (2018)
- Fellowship, College of Physicians and Surgeons Pakistan (CPSP)
- Sitara-i-Imtiaz – Government of Pakistan (2023)
- Honorary Fellowship, Royal College of Psychiatrists, United Kingdom (2024)
- Officer of the Order of the British Empire (OBE), United Kingdom (2025)
