= Pakistan Islamic Medical Association =

Pakistani medical association

Pakistan Islamic Medical Association (PIMA)
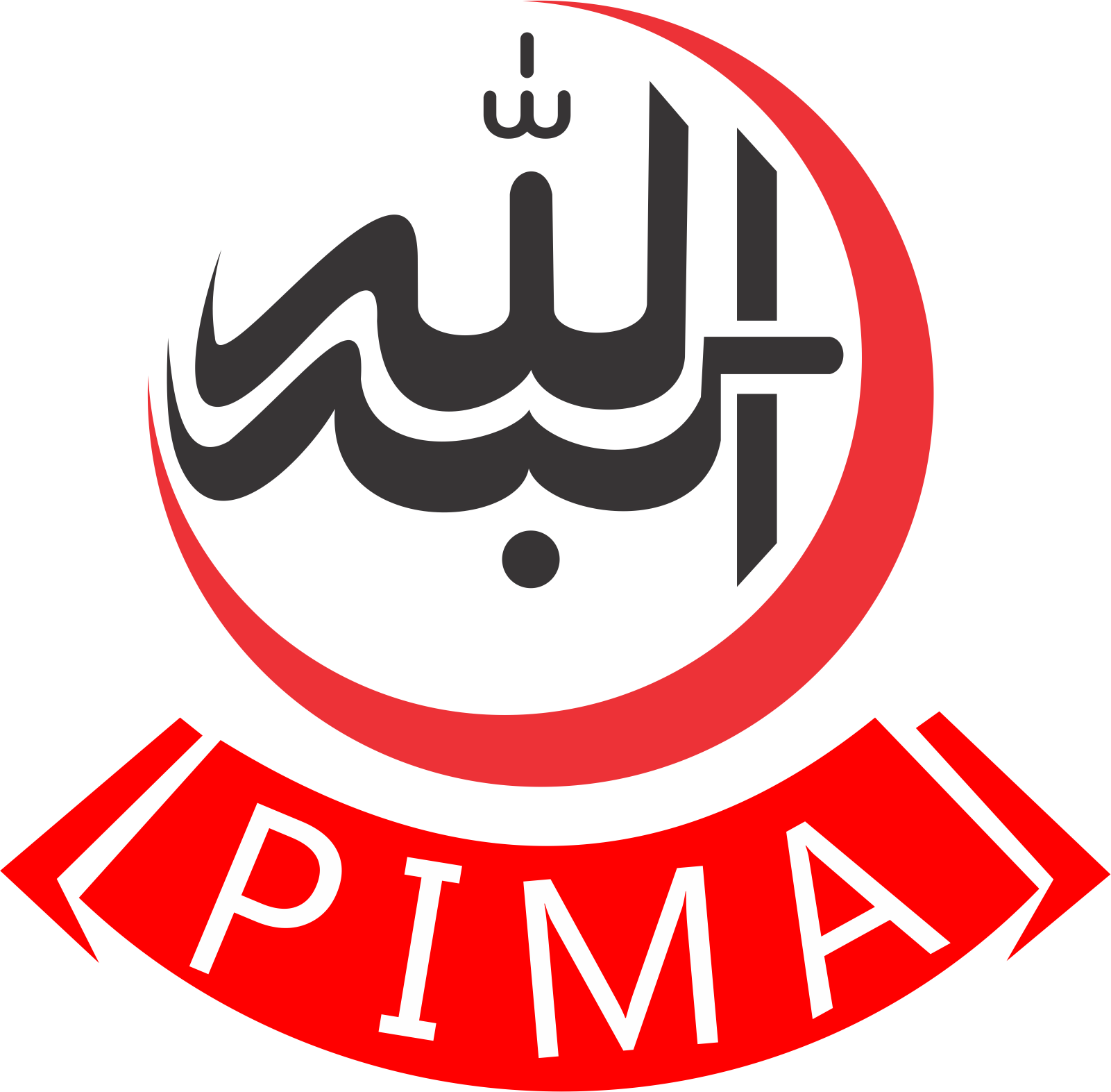
- Logo of PIMA
- Formation: October 1979
- Headquarters: Islamabad, Pakistan
- President: Prof. Atif Hafeez Siddiqui
- Website: pima.org.pk

The Pakistan Islamic Medical Association (PIMA) is a professional organization of medical doctors and was established in October 1997 in Pakistan. It promotes professional development among doctors, organizes educational and training programs, and advises on health policy. PIMA is affiliated with the Federation of Islamic Medical Associations (FIMA).

== Projects and activities ==
The Pakistan Islamic Medical Association (PIMA) operates several programs and branches that focus on healthcare, education, and community service. Its major initiatives include:

- Dawah and tarbiyah – Promotes moral and ethical development among doctors and medical students through Islamic guidance and training programs.
- Prevention of Blindness Trust – Organizes free eye camps, surgeries, and awareness campaigns to prevent avoidable blindness within Pakistan and abroad.
- Medical relief – Provides emergency medical assistance and health services during natural disasters, humanitarian crises, and in underserved communities.
- Continuous professional development (CPD) – Offers educational programs, workshops, and conferences aimed at enhancing medical knowledge and professional competence.
- Health awareness – Conducts public health campaigns to educate communities about disease prevention, hygiene, and general health practices.
- PIMA Women Wing – Supports female medical professionals through educational activities and programs focusing on women's health and empowerment.
- PIMA Students Branch – Supports medical students in academic, ethical, and community-oriented activities to foster professional and personal development.
- PIMA Dentistry Branch – Focuses on advancing dental education, organizing dental health camps, and promoting ethical standards in dentistry.
- FIMA and international collaboration – Works with the Federation of Islamic Medical Associations (FIMA) and other partners to promote Islamic medical ethics and humanitarian projects internationally.

== History ==
PIMA was founded by fifty Pakistani doctors who met at the Student-Teacher Center (STC) of the University of the Punjab in October 1979. This group laid the foundation for the Pakistan Doctors' Forum (PDF), a fraternity of medical professionals that continued its activities for two years. In April 1981, during a PDF convention held in Rawalpindi, the organization was renamed the Pakistan Islamic Medical Association (PIMA).

Since its establishment, PIMA has served as a national platform for Muslim medical professionals, promoting healthcare, education, and community service. It remains an active member of the Federation of Islamic Medical Associations (FIMA), an international network fostering collaboration among Islamic medical bodies worldwide.

== Activities ==
Since its inception, PIMA has provided professional development and training for doctors through regular dawah programs, workshops, and seminars. It has been involved in various relief efforts during national and international disasters such as earthquakes, tsunamis, floods, cyclones, and wars.

The organization also supports and operates medical institutions, hospitals, and community health centers. The Prevention of Blindness Trust is a key project that provides vision care in Pakistan and abroad. PIMA collaborates with FIMA on initiatives including the Consortium of Islamic Medical Colleges (CIMCO), Islamic Hospital Consortium (IHC), FIMA Save Vision, and FIMA Save Dignity.

Other notable accomplishments include large-scale initiatives such as the establishment of the Peshawar Medical College and involvement in pharmaceutical development projects.

== Public statements and criticism ==
In 2023, PIMA expressed concern about alleged political interference in Pakistan's health institutions, stating that the appointment of unqualified individuals could risk public safety. The association also commented on issues related to the Medical and Dental College Admission Test (MDCAT), citing concerns over transparency and mismanagement in the admissions process.
