= Graham Layton =

British Pakistani Army officer and businessperson

Gordon Graham Layton
- Born: 18 May 1917; London, United Kingdom
- Died: 7 March 1999 (aged 81)
- Citizenship: British, Pakistan
- Known for: Layton Rahmatulla Benevolent Trust
- Awards: Sitara-i-Quaid-i-Azam (1990)

Lieutenant-Colonel Gordon Graham Layton (18 May 1917 – 7 March 1999) was a British Pakistani Army officer, businessperson, and philanthropist. As a businessman, he co-founded MacDonald Layton Company, one of the most prominent construction companies in Pakistan. The company started as a boat-building business, at West Wharf Yard in Karachi. They soon expanded the business into house building and construction under the name of McDonald, Layton & Company (MLC).

As a philanthropist, who Layton co-founded the Layton Rahmatulla Benevolent Trust, which went on to become the largest non-governmental organisation working to fight blindness in Pakistan.

== Early life and career ==
Layton was born on 18 May 1917 and was brought up in North London. He was educated at Wellingborough School, in Northamptonshire.

He was commissioned from an officer cadet into the Royal Engineers as a second lieutenant on 21 September 1941. He served in India and Burma attached to the Royal Indian Engineers, rising to the rank of Captain & temporary Major. He was appointed a Member of the Military Division of the Order of the British Empire ‘in recognition of gallant and distinguished services in Burma and on the Eastern Frontier of India’

He received a mention in despatches ‘in recognition of gallant and distinguished services in Burma’ in the London Gazette 27 September 1945.

Subsequently, in the London Gazette of 6 June 1946 he was promoted from Member to Officer of the Military Division of Most Excellent Order of the British Empire, in recognition of gallant and distinguished services in Burma.

After the war Layton relinquished his emergency commission in the Royal Engineers as a Lieutenant and substantive Major in the war, and was granted the honorary rank of Lieut.-Colonel.

In 1947 Layton co-founded MacDonald Layton & Company in Karachi, and it became one of the most prominent construction companies in Pakistan.

In 1982, he divested his investment in McDonald Layton & Company and retired to the United Kingdom. In 1984, he acquired Pakistani citizenship.

In 1984 he co-founded the Layton Rahmatulla Benevolent Trust, with Zaka Rahmatulla, with Rs.500,000 apiece. It has been hugely successful, and is now the largest eye-care provider in Pakistan, and possibly in the world. It has treated over 48 million patients in 35 years, and on average treats over 10,500 patients every day, from a number of hospitals and clinics.

In 1990, Layton was awarded with the Sitara-i-Quaid-i-Azam. In the New Year's Honours in 1994, he was appointed a commander in the Civil Division of the Most Excellent Order of the British Empire ‘For services to the community in Pakistan'.

On his death in 1999, Layton left the bulk of his estate for the benefit of the Layton Rahmatulla Benevolent Trust.
