= Amjad Saqib =

Pakistani philanthropist and social entrepreneur and author

- Born: 1 February 1957 (age 69); Kamalia, Punjab, Pakistan
- Citizenship: Pakistani
- Education: Government College University, Lahore; King Edward Medical College, Lahore; American University, Washington DC
- Occupations: Social entrepreneur, philanthropist and author
- Known for: Akhuwat Foundation, Largest interest-free Microfinance credit program
- Relatives: Afzal Javed (brother)
- Honours: Sitara-e-Imtiaz (2010); Life Time Achievement (2015); Ramon Magsaysay Award (2021); Hilal-e-Imtiaz (2023)
- Website: Official website

Muhammad Amjad Saqib (Punjabi, Urdu: امجد ثاقب; 1 February 1957) is a Pakistani social entrepreneur, development practitioner, former civil servant and author. He is the founder and executive director of Akhuwat Foundation, which is the world's largest Islamic microfinance organization that provides interest-free loans to the most deserving segments of society.

Since its establishment in 2001, the organisation has disbursed over PKR 433 billion in interest-free loans to more than 3.8 million families in Pakistan (as of September, 2026). Akhuwat works in multiple areas of poverty alleviation and has initiated several projects, including Akhuwat Institute Kasur (AIK), described as Pakistan's first fee-free university, which admits students from across the country who may not otherwise have access to higher education. The organisation also runs programmes related to financial inclusion, access to education and healthcare, support for the transgender community, and the provision of food and clothing.

Saqib’s professional work has been associated with social mobilization, poverty alleviation, microfinance, and education management. He has authored nine books, including Akhuwat ka Safar and Molu Musali, which document the formation of Akhuwat, and he contributes opinion columns to various Pakistani newspapers. His recognitions include national and international awards such as the Sitara-e-Imtiaz and Hilal-e-Imtiaz, as well as the Ramon Magsaysay Award in 2021 for the organisation's interest-free loan programme.

== Life and Career ==
Amjad Saqib was born in 1957 in Kamalia, Tehsil of Toba Tek singh, a small city in Punjab. After completing his early education, he joined Government College, Lahore, and went on to complete his bachelor's degree in medicine (M.B.B.S) from King Edward Medical College in 1982. He was awarded the Hubert H. Humphrey Fellowship in 1995 and pursued his master's degree in Public Administration from American University, Washington D.C.

Muhammad Amjad Saqib also enrolled in a year-long program at LUMS, which was in collaboration with McGill University related to Social Enterprise & Management. Additionally, he has completed several professional development courses on leadership from Harvard University.

In 2003, he left Pakistan Civil Services and decided to devote all his efforts towards working for public welfare and social development through the establishment of Akhuwat.

He provides consultancy services to different organizations including International Labour Organization, Asian Development Bank, UNICEF, World Bank, and Canadian International Development Agency. He has been invited to speak on the issues of poverty alleviation and social entrepreneurship at different institutions such as Harvard University, University of Oxford, and University of Cambridge. He was invited to speak at the United Nations Economic and Social Council on ‘Taking Action to Improve Lives’ conference, where he spoke about the need of adopting an integrated and holistic approach towards poverty reduction. He is also a member of Blessing for All foundation.

He is married to Farrukh Amjad; they have two children, Junaid Farid and Farazeen Amjad Shahid.

=== Akhuwat ===
Established in 2001, Akhuwat is a registered non-profit organisation, with its headquarters in Pakistan, providing interest-free loans, also known as Qarz-e-Hasan, as a means of addressing poverty. As of 2026, its flagship program Akhuwat Islamic Microfinance (AIM) has disbursed PKR 433 billion in interest-free loans to 3.8 million families across Pakistan, reporting a repayment rate of 99.9%. The organisation employs over 8,000 staff members and operates more than 890 branches in 400+ cities in Pakistan.

Akhuwat was founded in line with the Islamic principle of Mawakhat (brotherhood/solidarity). The earliest example of this concept is traced to the solidarity between the citizens of Medina and the Muhajireen (Meccan migrants) who settled there after fleeing persecution, when resources were shared between the two groups. Akhuwat applies this concept of brotherhood within its organisational framework, promoting a model based on principles of compassion and equity.

In addition to microfinance, Akhuwat runs programmes in education, healthcare, and social support for marginalised groups. These include Akhuwat Education Services, Akhuwat Clothes Bank, Akhuwat Khwajasira Support Program, and Akhuwat Health Services. In education, it established Akhuwat Institute Kasur (AIK), described as Pakistan’s first fee-free residential university-level institution, which admits students from low-income households.

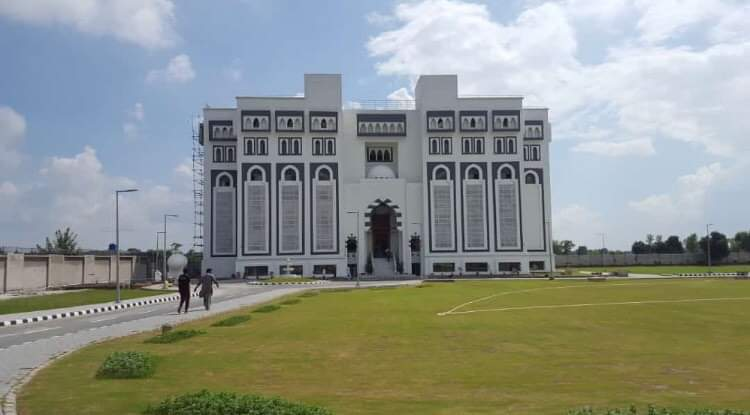
Akhuwat University

Akhuwat's Education Services reportedly includes a network of over 600 schools and 3 colleges. Akhuwat has distributed over 5.6 million clothes to low income families across all provinces of Pakistan. This project was appreciated by the Punjab Government and Federal Government. He visited Sweden and Denmark to meet with overseas Pakistanis and discuss their role in contributing to development efforts. The Akhuwat Khwajasira Support Program is reported to provide psycho-social therapy, skills and vocational training, literacy and health workshops to thousands of transgenders across Pakistan. They have held free medical camps and awareness seminars, and provided free treatment and vaccinations for diseases such as hepatitis C and hepatitis B.

== Literary works ==
The literary works of Muhammad Amjad Saqib include:

- (2021) Chaar Aadmi
- (2020) Integral Finance – Akhuwat A Case Study of the Solidarity Economy
- (2019) Maulo Musali
- (2016) Kamyab Loag
- (2015) Shahar-e-Lab-e-Darya (This book won the Khushhal Khan Khattak Literary Award)
- (2014) Gotam Ke Dais Main (A travelogue to Nepreaorted to be the pl)
- (2014) Akhuwat Ka Safar
- (2014) Dasht-e-Zulmat Main Aik Diya
- (2014) Aik Yaadgaar Mushaira
- (2013) Ghurbat Aur Microcredit
- (2009) Devolution and Governance: Reforms in Pakistan edited by Muhammad Amjad Saqib
- (2023) Silaab Ki Kahani

All Urdu books have been published by Sang-e-Meel Publications 35 Shahrah-e-Pakistan (Lower Mall), Lahore, Pakistan.

== Honors and awards ==
- Sitara-i-Imtiaz, awarded by the President of Pakistan for Saqib's work for poverty alleviation in Pakistan (2010)
- Gold Medal presented by Prime Minister Yousaf Raza Gillani, for Saqib's contribution to social change in Pakistan (2010)
- Lifetime Achievement Award, presented by Abu Dhabi Islamic Bank and Thomson Reuters for Akhuwat's contribution to Islamic Finance (2014)
- Social Entrepreneur of the year, awarded by World Economic Forum (WEF) and Schwab Foundation in recognition of his contributions as a social entrepreneur (2018).
- Commonwealth's 31st Point of Light Award presented by Queen Elizabeth II in recognition of Saqib's services for poverty alleviation and restoring human dignity in Pakistan (2018)
- Social Entrepreneur Award by Chief Minister Punjab, Shahbaz Sharif; for Akhuwat's contribution for poverty alleviation (2018)
- Islamic Finance Excellence Award by Comsats University Pakistan in commemoration of Akhuwat's contribution to the advancement of Islamic finance (2018)
- Shaan-e-Pakistan (Pride of Pakistan) awarded by President of Pakistan, Arif Alvi acknowledging Saqib's efforts and welfare work during COVID-19 (2020)
- "I Am The Change" Award (IATC) by Engro Corporation to pay tribute to local change agents who have worked to improve the livelihoods of the poorest of the poor in Pakistan (2013)
- Honorary Citizenship of Louisville, USA awarded by Mayor Greg E. Fischer for introducing the novel idea of interest-free microfinance. (2014)
- Awarded 35th Human Rights Award presented by Human Rights Society of Pakistan in recognition of his contribution to preserving and ensuring human rights of minorities (HRSP) (2015)
- Pace Award, presented by Pakistani American Community for high integrity and innovative ideas under the banner of Akhuwat (2017)
- Islamic Economics Application Award at the 6th Islamic Economics Workshop in Turkey for developing underprivileged communities in Pakistan (2018) IGIAD's President Ayhan Karahan (2018)
- Islamic Economy Award presented at the Global Islamic Summit by Hamdan bin Mohammed Al Maktoum, Crown Prince of Dubai and Thomson Reuters recognizing Akhuwat's contribution to Islamic Economics (2018).
- The Ramon Magsaysay Award 2021 for Saqib's first-of-its-kind interest- and collateral-free microfinance loan programme that has helped millions of poor families.
- Nominated for the 2022 Nobel Peace Prize.
- Hilal-e-Imtiaz, awarded by the President of Pakistan for Saqib's work in distribution of interest-free loans to 6 million families across Pakistan (2023)

== See also ==
- List of philanthropists
- Hakim Muhammad Said
- Abdul Sattar Edhi
- Ruth Pfau
- Imran Khan
- Abrar Ul Haq
