= Peter Jacob Gill =

Pakistani human rights activist

Peter Jacob
- Born: 22 April 1961 (age 65); Khanewal, Pakistan
- Education: LLB, University of Karachi, Masters in Rural Development, University of Sindh, Masters in Political Science, Islamia University of Bahawalpur, (Pakistan); LLM, University of Notre Dame (USA)
- Occupations: Human rights activist Researcher; Columnist
- Organization(s): Executive Director, Centre for Social Justice Pakistan; Chairperson, Peoples Commission for Minorities' Rights
- Awards: International Religious Freedom Award
- Website: https://csjpak.org/

Peter Jacob (born 22 April 1961) is a human rights defender, researcher, trainer and columnist. He has headed the Centre for Social Justice as the executive director since October 2014, and the Peoples Commission for Minorities' Rights as the chairperson since 2018. He established institutions for human equality and dignity, particularly National Commission for Justice and Peace, and Centre for Social Justice, and served as a member of National Curriculum Council, established by the Ministry of Federal Education and Professional Training. He has been recognized internationally, and is a recipient of the US Department of State’s International Religious Freedom Award.

== Education ==
He was born and raised in Khanewal, Punjab, Pakistan. He completed his early education at St. Vincent's High School, Mian Channun, district Khanewal, which was nationalized by the Government of Pakistan in 1972. He did LLB from University of Karachi in 1985 and earned an LLM degree in International Human Rights Law from the University of Notre Dame, USA in 2014. He did Masters in Political Science from Islamia University Bahawalpur in 1988, and completed Masters in Rural Development and Project Management from University of Sindh and Wye College University of London in 2003.

== Career ==
Jacob has been associated with several national and international human rights organizations since 1988 in different capacities, including Amnesty International Pakistan, Hotline Asia, Forum Asia, and Human Rights Commission of Pakistan. He has been a member of the Council of Experts for the International Religious Freedom or Belief Alliance since 2021.

He worked at Justice and Peace Commission, as assistant and acting Executive Secretary (1988–1990), The Pastoral Institute, Multan as a lecturer and executive staff (1990–1995), and National Commission for Justice and Peace as its executive director (1995–2013), Visiting Scholar at Kroc Institute for Peace Studies, Klau Institute for Civil and Human Rights, Notre Dame University USA.

He has been part of several movements, campaigns, and networks, and has led some of them relating to minorities rights including campaigns for restoration of Joint Electorate, the abolition of the column for religion in the national identity card, the implementation of Jillani Judgement, the reforms in Christian Marriage Laws, and the establishment of statutory national commission for minorities rights, and the inclusive and equitable education, and ending forced marriages and forced conversions in Pakistan.

Jacob' work focuses on the rights of marginalized minorities, women and labour and he has written blogs and articles published in reputed newspapers including, The News on Sunday, The News International, Express Tribune, Dawn, Global Open Democracy, University of Notre Dame, HumSub and The Friday Times.

== Publication ==
Jacob contributed to over 100 articles, and over 50 research based studies.

=== a) Articles for books ===
1. “Religious Minorities: The heart of the alternative narrative”, in the book "Pakistan: Alternative imag(in)ing of the Nation-State", published by Oxford University Press, 2018, edited by Jürgen Schaflechner, Christina Oesterheld, and Ayesha Asif.
2. “Common Ground Between Religious Minorities and Secular Forces in Pakistan”, in the book “The Rise of Religion Based Political Movements”, published by Strategic Information and Research Development Centre, Malaysia, 2009, edited by Darwis Khudori.
3. "Religious Minorities: The Struggle for Rights in Pakistan", in the book “At the Cross Roads: South Asian Research, Policy and Development in a Globalized World” published by Sustainable Development Policy Institute, Pakistan, 2007.
4. "Identity Questions for Christians in Pakistan", in the book “Religious Minorities in South Asia”, published by Manak Publications Delhi, 2002, edited by Monirul Hassain & Lipi Ghosh.

=== b) Research studies and publications ===
1. What Are We Teaching in School? focuses on content review of school textbooks published by federal and provincial textbook boards in Pakistan.
2. Quality Education Vs. Fanatic Literary on analysis of textbooks, curriculum and policies in Pakistan.
3. Human Rights Observer, an annual fact sheet covering key developments and data analysis regarding issues of religious freedom and minorities’ rights in Pakistan.
4. Silence of the Lamb, a working paper based on research and analysis of forced conversions of minority girls in Pakistan.
5. Lessons from the nationalization of education focuses on the impact of education policy of 1972 on education and minorities.
6. Promises to Keep & Miles to Go on assessment of progress against political parties’ manifesto, focusing on pledges and actions to protect minorities' rights.
7. Justice Yet Afar, a compliance analysis of the Supreme Court's Verdict (SMC No. 1/2014) given by then Chief Justice Tassaduq Hussain Jillani on 19 June 2014.
8. Confusing demographics of minorities on assessment of census data in Pakistan.
9. Implementation of Job Quota on assessment of the job quota policy for religious minorities in Pakistan.
10. Defining National Interest in Human Development, assessing the economic, developmental and relational impact of policy for the regulation of INGOs in Pakistan.
11. Life On the Margins on the situation of minority women in Punjab and Sindh Provinces.
12. How green was my village, development profile of villages with sizable Christian population in Punjab, Pakistan.
13. Tedious Path to Poverty Alleviation on assessment of indebtedness and cyclic poverty among religious minorities in Punjab, Pakistan.
14. Insani Haqooq Ke Irteqa, a book on brief history of the evolution of human rights.
15. Insani Haqooq Ka Bainulaqwami Nizam, a book on United Nations international human rights mechanisms.
16. Building Peace from the Bottom on assessment of local-level peace-building efforts and peace committees.
17. Combating Hate Speech beyond Administrative Measures on analysis of laws and policies dealing with Hate Speech.

== Awards and recognition ==
He received several awards and accolades, nationally and internationally, including the best correspondent of Ucanews for 1998, Bishop Tji Hak-soon Justice & Peace Award, South Korea, 2001, Tulip International Award for human rights in 2001 as executive director of the Catholic (National) Commission for Justice and Peace. He also mentored the documentary film, Humsaya (Neighbour), as executive producer of the film, which won an award for the best documentary on Human Rights at the Venice International Film Festival in 2023. The US State Department bestowed on him the Religious Freedom Award in 2024.
