= THAAP =

Pakistani nonprofit organisation

- Trust for History, Art and Architecture of Pakistan
- Organisation's logo
- Abbreviation: THAAP
- Formation: 2006
- Type: Nonprofit organization
- Purpose: Cultural Heritage
- Location: Lahore, Pakistan
- Key people: Prof. Pervaiz Vandal (Director), Prof. Sajida Haider Vandal (CEO)
- Website: www.thaap.org.pk

The Trust for History, Art and Architecture of Pakistan commonly known as THAAP, is a Nonprofit organization founded in 2006 and based in Lahore, Pakistan. THAAP was registered as a not-for-profit company in 2011, under the regulations of Section 42 of the Security Exchange Commission of Pakistan. THAAP was established to help the promotion of cultural heritage in Pakistan which includes; management and planning for historic sites and landscapes, documentation, conservation, community engagement, and creativity in education. THAAP projects include Thaap heritage activities, conferences, publications, crafts, and the Ma Boli Centre for the study of language and cultural expression.

In 2011 THAAP was recognized as an NGO for its work on intangible cultural heritage by UNESCO. In addition to specific projects, one outcome of this joint work was the first inventory of intangible cultural heritage material for Pakistan. Further work with UNESCO has included encouragement of craft industries in areas of Pakistan suffering from desertification.

The educational side of THAAP's work includes both publication of works on cultural heritage and the organization of an annual international conference on varied themes. The first occurred in 2010, with the theme ‘Historiography of Architecture in Pakistan and the Region’. Conference themes include:

- 2010, Historiography of Architecture in Pakistan and the Region
- 2011, Portrait of Lahore Capital City of the Punjab
- 2012, Life in Small Towns
- 2013, Cultural Roots of Art and Architecture of the Punjab
- 2014, Culture, Art and Architecture of the Marginalised and the Poor
- 2015, People's History of Pakistan
- 2016, People and the City
- 2017, The City: An Evolving Organism

More recently, THAAP has been heavily involved in the archaeology of the Indus Valley Civilization both through organizing conferences on the topic (the 11th and 12th international THAAP conferences were both devoted to this subject) and through involvement in new excavations at Ganweriwal, a major but relatively unknown Indus Valley site.
