= Ecotourism Society Pakistan =

Ecotourism Society Pakistan (ESP) is an organization based in Pakistan which seeks to promote ecotourism in the mountain eco-regions of Pakistan as a way of raising the standard of living in those areas.
