= Gul Bahao =

Environmental non-governmental organization in Sindh, Pakistan

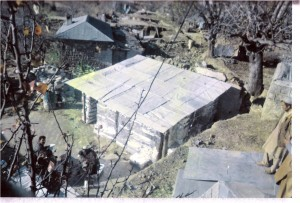
- Modular prefabricated housing setup by the Pakistani NGO, Gul Bahao. The housing was provided to earthquake victims in the north part of the country
- Type: NGO
- Purpose: Environmental research
- Location: Karachi, Sindh, Pakistan

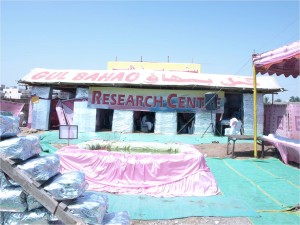
Waste management research center

Gul Bahao is an environmental non-governmental organization based in Karachi, Sindh, Pakistan. It has received international recognition for its work on environmental research in the country. Along with its research activities, has provided practical solutions for low cost housing, water sanitation, and garbage disposal.

== Garbage processing in Karachi ==
Nargis Latif runs Gul Bahao which is situated in Karachi. The city produces 12,000 tonnes of garbage every day, Nargis Latif's team has established a recycling system there. Gul Bahao recycle garbage and create houses, water reservoirs and swimming pools out of it. Blocks created by Chandi technology are used for the construction of houses.
