= Bilquis Edhi =

Pakistani nurse and philanthropist (1947–2022)

Bilquis Edhi HI
- بلقیس ایدھی
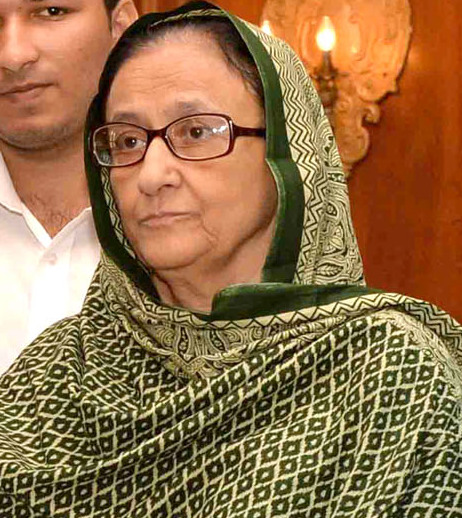
- Edhi in 2015
- Born: 14 August 1947; Bantva, British India
- Died: 15 April 2022 (aged 74); Karachi, Pakistan
- Resting place: Mewa Shah Graveyard, Karachi
- Citizenship: Pakistani
- Occupations: Nurse; Philanthropist
- Organization: Edhi Foundation
- Office: Co-chair of Edhi Foundation
- Spouse: Abdul Sattar Edhi (m. 1965; died 2016)
- Children: 4

Bilquis Bano Edhi HI (Urdu: بلقیس ایدھی; 14 August 1947 – 15 April 2022) was a Pakistani nurse who helped save the lives of over 16,000 children. During her career as a nurse and marriage to Abdul Sattar Edhi, she was one of the most active philanthropists in Pakistan. She was the co-chair of the Edhi Foundation, a charity organization that provided many services in Pakistan including a hospital and emergency service in Karachi. For her contributions, she was awarded the 1986 Ramon Magsaysay Award for Public Service and the Mother Teresa Memorial International Award for Social Justice in 2015. She was also a recipient of Hilal-i-Imtiaz, Pakistan's second highest civilian honour. For her service to the country, she was also referred to as The Mother of Pakistan.

== Biography ==
Bilquis was born during the British Raj in 1947 to Muslims in Bantva, India in Gujarat. As a teenager she was noted to have not enjoyed school and instead joined a small and expanding dispensary as a nurse in 1965. At the time, the Edhi home was in the old city area of Karachi known as Mithadar where it had been founded in 1951. The small number of nurses, predominantly Christian and Hindu, who worked there had just reduced in number. The dispensary's founder, Abdul Sattar Edhi, recruited a number of nurses, including Bilquis who, unusually, was from a Muslim background. Bilquis Edhi went on to marry Abdul. The two remained married until his death on 8 July 2016.

Her husband recognizing her talents, had her lead the small nursing department. He had recognized her enthusiasm and interest during her six-month training program where she had learned basic midwifery and healthcare. They were married when she was nineteen and he was 38 years old. Their honeymoon was unusual in that the newlyweds discovered a young girl with head injuries at their dispensary just after their wedding ceremony. Edhi said in 1989 that she did not regret the time lost in consoling the twelve-year-old's concerned relatives or supervising blood transfusions as now "... that girl is married with children; that's what is really important." The Edhi Foundation's unofficial website uses the line "Making a difference and changing lives forever."

Bilquis took over the management of the jhoolas project (transl. baby hatch), the first of which had been built by her husband in 1952. She established over 300 cradles throughout Pakistan where parents can surrender unwanted infants. The cradles carry the message “Do not kill, leave the baby to live in the cradle” in English and Urdu. Over 90% of the surrendered infants are female and a portion of them are disabled. This alternative is thought to have reduced the number of infanticide cases by parents. The Edhi Foundation is also responsible for burying dead babies found by the police. Along with her husband, Bilquis was the co-chair of the Edhi Foundation. The foundation also runs a hospital and emergency service in Karachi.

=== Recognition ===
Bilquis and her husband had received a number of awards in recognition of their work. In July 2007, they were publicly recognized for their work by President Pervez Musharraf who made a personal contribution of 100,000 rupees to the Edhi Foundation. President Musharraf also noted that their work provided social services to the poor of Pakistan without any discrimination. This contribution contrasts sharply with another offered by President Zia ul-Haq which was turned down because of his perceived political motivations. Despite their relative fame, the couple lived modestly in a two-room apartment which is part of one of their orphanages.

In 2022, Bilquis Edhi was named among The Muslim 500, a worldwide list of most influential Muslims. She was also a recipient of the Hilal-i-Imtiaz, Pakistan's second highest civilian honour.

=== Death ===
She died on 15 April 2022 in Aga Khan Hospital, Karachi, due to congestive heart failure after a prolonged illness. Her funeral prayers were offered at New Memon Masjid after which she was buried in Mewa Shah Graveyard, Karachi, on 16 April 2022. The Government of Sindh issued an official obituary for her on her death and announced a day of mourning on 16 April 2022.

== See also ==
- Abdul Sattar Edhi
