= Centre for Social Justice Pakistan =

Pakistani non-governmental human rights organisation

Centre for Social Justice
- Abbreviation: CSJ
- Formation: 2014
- Type: Non-governmental organization
- Headquarters: Lahore, Punjab, Pakistan
- Key people: Wajahat Masood, Chairperson; Peter Jacob, Executive Director; Suneel Malik, Deputy Director
- Website: www.csjpak.org

Centre for Social Justice (CSJ) is a non-governmental organisation headquartered in Lahore, Pakistan, that conducts research, policy advocacy and capacity building on human rights, democratic development and social justice, with a particular focus on religious minorities. Founded in 2014, CSJ engages in policy dialogue with government departments and ministries, educational institutions, national human rights bodies and civil society organisations. It is led by Peter Jacob, a human rights defender and columnist who has headed the organisation as executive director since October 2014.

== Leadership ==
Peter Jacob, a human rights defender, trainer and columnist, serves as executive director of the Centre for Social Justice, while Suneel Malik serves as deputy director. Wajahat Masood, a columnist and analyst, serves as chairperson. Jacob has received the International Religious Freedom Award from the United States Department of State for his work on religious freedom and minority rights in Pakistan.

== Working Group for Inclusive Education ==
CSJ facilitates coordination among the Working Group for Inclusive Education, a body of educationists, researchers and policy experts. The group conducts research-based analysis, monitors policy-making processes and undertakes evidence-based advocacy on curriculum, education policy and textbooks, and promotes dialogue with policymakers to support inclusive, equitable and quality learning.

== Peoples' Commission for Minorities' Rights ==
CSJ facilitates coordination for the Peoples' Commission for Minorities' Rights (PCMR), a body drawn from academia, journalism and legal practice with expertise in rights-based work. PCMR undertakes awareness-raising and advocacy for legislation affecting religious minorities, and issues statements on human rights violations and related policy matters.

== 2022 government scrutiny ==
In August 2022, Pakistan's federal Ministry of Interior asked provincial authorities in Punjab to take action against CSJ following a report in the Urdu-language newspaper Daily Jang alleging that the organisation had disseminated "propaganda against Pakistan" at the United Nations Human Rights Council. The action followed CSJ's submission of a report to the Human Rights Council on blasphemy laws and forced conversions ahead of Pakistan's fourth Universal Periodic Review. A coalition of 37 civil society associations in Lahore, organised as the Joint Action Committee for Peoples' Rights, publicly defended CSJ against the allegations.

== Publications ==
CSJ has produced research studies on themes relating to human rights, including:

1. White Paper on Confusing Demographics of Minorities, an assessment of population census data on religious minorities in Pakistan.
2. Human Rights Observer, an annual factsheet on the rights of religious minorities in Pakistan, covering blasphemy law cases, forced conversions and educational reform.
3. Quality Education Vs Fanatic Literacy, a study analysing education policy and textbook content.
4. Challenges in Exercising Religious Freedom in Pakistan.
5. Silence of the Lamb, a study on forced conversions in Pakistan.
6. Lessons from the Nationalisation of Education in 1972, a study of the impact of the 1972 education policy on minorities.
7. Implementation of Job Quota for Religious Minorities in Pakistan, assessing implementation of the job quota policy.
8. Justice Yet Afar and A Long Wait for Justice, a compliance assessment of the Supreme Court's verdict in Suo Motu Case No. 1 of 2014 on minority rights, delivered by then-Chief Justice Tassaduq Hussain Jillani on 19 June 2014.
9. Defining National Interest in Human Development, a study assessing the economic and developmental impact of Pakistan's policy for regulating INGOs.
