= National Research and Development Foundation =

The National Research and Development Foundation is a private non-governmental organization in Saint Lucia, organized in 1983. The Foundation emerged from the Caribbean Research Center, which similarly promoted research and development in Saint Lucia.

The NRDF presently offers a host of learning programmes aimed at improving the standard of education in Saint Lucia. The available courses include master's degrees, Bachelor's degrees, Advanced Diplomas, as well as a host of vocational courses for young people who may not have completed their secondary school education.
