= Family Educational Services Foundation =

Pakistani non-profit foundation

- Founded: 1984
- Type: Non-profit educational foundation
- Purpose: Educational development, Deaf education, Training programs, Volunteer empowerment
- Location: Karachi, Pakistan
- Region served: Pakistan
- Website: fesf.org.pk

Family Educational Services Foundation (FESF) is a non-profit, educational organization based in Karachi, Sindh, Pakistan. It is working in Pakistan since 1984. FESF provides educational services, with particular focus on Deaf children and youth. FESF is registered as a non-profit organization with the SECP and is tax exempt.

== Projects ==
=== Deaf Reach Program ===
Upwards of nine million people in Pakistan (5% of pop.) have some form of hearing loss. Of this group, there are approximately 1.5 million profoundly deaf children of school age – the majority of whom suffer from no educational opportunities. The Deaf Reach Program was established in Pakistan in 1998, initially working informally with deaf youth and young adults. The first Deaf Reach School was established by FESF in Karachi in 2005, and the program has grown rapidly to where there are now eight Deaf Reach Schools and Training Centers located in Karachi, Hyderabad, Sukkur, Nawabshah, and Lahore, Rashidabad, Jhelum, and Sujawal.

These schools provide free education and training to over 1,500 deaf children and young adults from low-income families in both urban and rural areas. There is an important focus on girls attending school, with a female enrollment of 48%.

Deaf Reach is the only school for the Deaf in Pakistan that has a branch network, providing educational opportunities in rural areas. Training is also provided for all parents and families in learning how to communicate and care for their children. There is also an active Financial Inclusion program for deaf young adults with training in marketable skills leading to employment and financial independence.

In 2014, FESF launched a Pakistan Sign Language (PSL) lexicon referencing 5,000 words. The PSL Lexicon received the 2014 P@SHA Award in e-Inclusion & e-Community category.

In 2021, Richard Geary, founder of FESF, was awarded the Sitara-e-Khidmat for long years of service to Pakistan.

=== Motivated Volunteer Empowerment Program ===
The Motivated Volunteer Empowerment (MOVE) Program is aimed at high school and university students but is also effective as a training program. The training courses are organized and implemented by Family Educational Services Foundation (FESF). The MOVE program is an educational development resource, which focuses on leadership, soft skills and volunteerism. The program meets the need for developing committed volunteers and engaging youth voice in solving social problems.

The six training sessions are followed by two project planning workshops. At least one community development project is carried out by participants from each MOVE program. Theoretical training along with practical experience is a vital ingredient of MOVE. To this effect, FESF coordinates field implementation projects for the students in partnership with local institutions around the country. Many of the MOVE graduates have gone on to be actively involved in their community with some initiating and sustaining highly effective volunteer projects on a regular basis.

=== Community Services ===
A few programs that are regularly organized are:

- A yearly Summer Camp for deaf and orphan children
- An annual Children's Benefit Concert for approx. 5,000 disabled and underprivileged children.
- Uplift programs in hospitals
- Extra-curricular classes and events for less privileged children
- Regular book drives and creation of libraries in needy schools and institutes

All of these programs are achieved with the help of volunteers.

==== Master Trainer Program ====
FESF, in collaboration with NOWPDP launched a master trainer program in Jan. 2010, "Instructing and Guiding Children with Special Education Needs." The program objective is capacity building for teachers who impart special education in government and private schools countrywide. 10 master trainers were developed who went on to conduct courses for 226 teachers from 25 different institutes in Karachi and Islamabad.

==== Funding and support ====
Family Educational Services Foundation is exempt from taxation under the Pakistan law. FESF receives the majority of its funding via donations and sponsorship from individuals, businessmen, corporate sponsorship and foundations.
