= Layton Rahmatullah Benevolent Trust =

Pakistani non-profit organisation founded Graham Layton and Zaka Rahmatulla

- Abbreviation: LRBT
- Formation: 1984; 42 years ago
- Founder: Graham Layton; Zaka Rahmatulla
- Type: NGO
- Legal status: Charity
- Purpose: Free eye care and blindness prevention
- Headquarters: Korangi, Karachi, Sindh, Pakistan
- Coordinates: 24.8306°N 67.0669°E
- Region served: Pakistan
- Website: lrbt.org.pk

Layton Rahmatullah Benevolent Trust (LRBT) is a major non-governmental organisation, working to fight blindness in Pakistan. It is assumed to be not only the largest eye provider in the country but also the largest eye care provider in the world to have treated over 54 million patients in 38 years. The organization treats 10,200 OPD patients every single day. Established in 1984, it is based in Karachi with hospitals and primary eye care centers throughout the country.

== Name ==
The Trust is named for its two founders: Graham Layton and Zaka Rahmatulla, both whom contributed Rs. 500,000/- each to start it.

== History ==
The trust was founded in 1984 with Rs. 500,000 apiece by Graham Layton, an Englishman who become a Pakistani citizen, and Zaka Rahmatulla. The two began by setting up a mobile health unit in Tando Bago, Sindh. Upon his death, Layton left his estate for the benefit of LRBT.

== Network ==
As of 2023, there are 19 fully-equipped hospitals and 56 primary eyecare centers across Pakistan. Any Pakistani is just 200 km away from a LRBT facility.

=== Hospitals ===
- Korangi, Karachi, Sindh (Base Eye Hospital)
- Akora Khattak, Nowshera District, Khyber Pakhtunkhwa** Google Map Link Layton Rahmatulla Benevolent Trust Free Eye Hospital
- Arifwala, Pakpattan District, Punjab
- Odigram, Swat District, KPK Google map link
- Gambat, Khairpur District, Sindh
- Khanewal, District Khanewal, Punjab
- Lahore Township, Punjab
- Lar, Multan District, Punjab
- Mandra, Rawalpindi District, Punjab
- Chiniot, Chiniot District, Punjab
- Mansehra, Mansehra District, KPK
- Quetta, Quetta District, Balochistan
- Pasrur, Sialkot District, Punjab
- Rashidabad, Tando Allahyar District, Sindh
- Shahpur, Sargodha District, Punjab
- Kalakalay, Sawat District, KPK (Hospital)
- Lahore Multan Road, Punjab
- North Karachi, Karachi, Sindh
- Tando Bago, Badin District, Sindh
