= Abdul Sattar Edhi =

Pakistani philanthropist (1928-2016)

Abdul Sattar Edhi NI LPP AMPP
- عبد الستار ایدھی
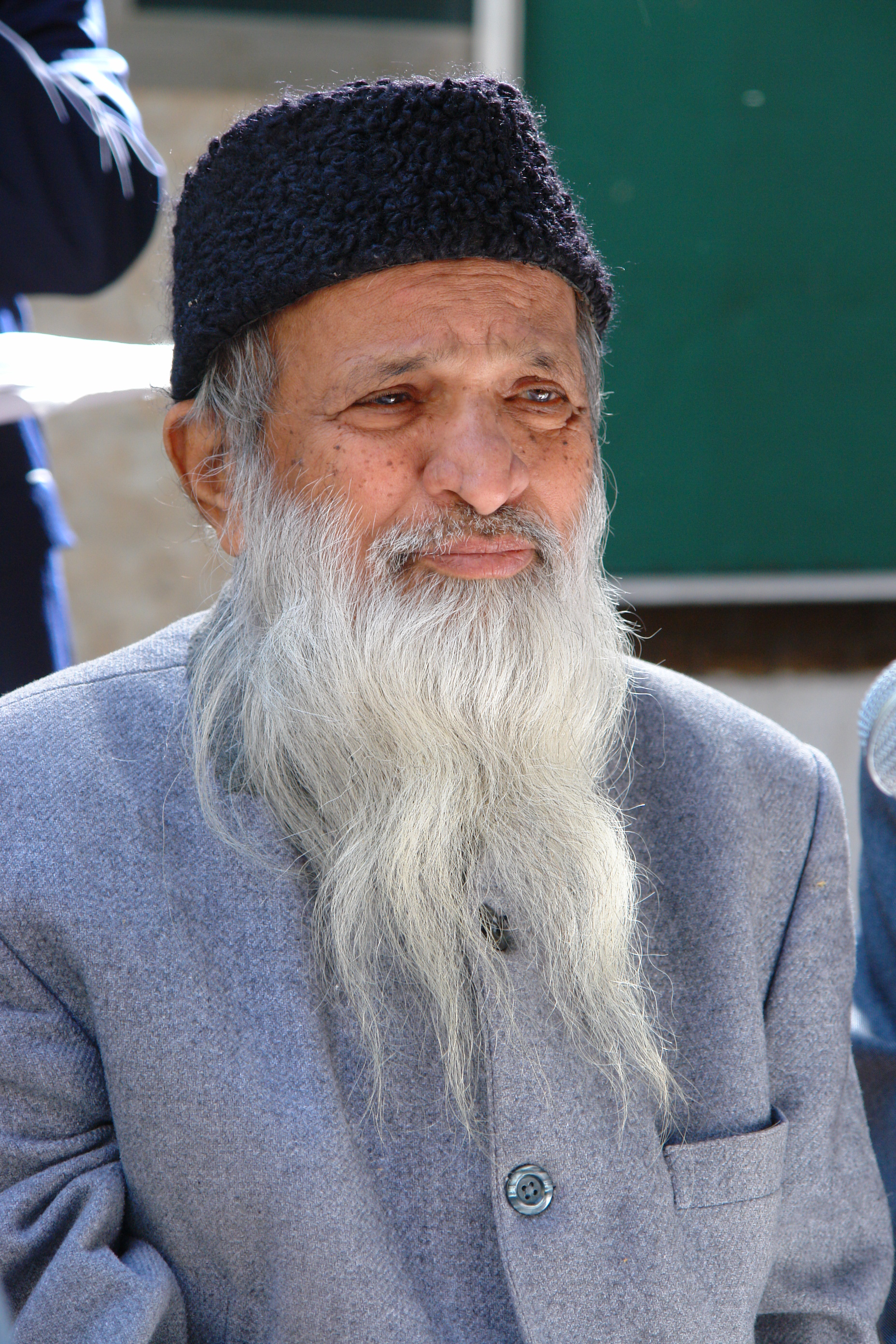
- Edhi, c. 2009
- Born: 28 February 1928; Bantva, Bantva Manavadar, British India
- Died: 8 July 2016 (aged 88); Karachi, Sindh, Pakistan
- Resting place: Edhi Village, Karachi; 25.05°N 67.49°E
- Other names: Angel of Mercy; The Richest Poor Man
- Organization: Edhi Foundation
- Spouse: Bilquis Edhi (m. 1965)
- Children: 4
- Awards: Lenin Peace Prize (1988); Bacha Khan Peace Award (1990); Nishan-e-Imtiaz (1989); Wolf of Bhogio Peace Award (2005); Ahmadiyya Muslim Peace Prize (2010)
- Website: edhi.org

Abdul Sattar Edhi NI LPP (Urdu: عبد الستار ایدھی; 28 February 1928 – 8 July 2016) was a Pakistani humanitarian, philanthropist and ascetic who founded the Edhi Foundation, which runs the world's largest volunteer ambulance network, along with homeless shelters, animal shelters, rehabilitation centres, and orphanages across Pakistan.

Edhi's charitable activities expanded greatly in 1957 when an Asian flu epidemic originating in China swept through Pakistan and the rest of the world. Donations allowed him to buy his first ambulance the same year. He later expanded his charity network with the help of his wife Bilquis Edhi. Following his death, his son Faisal Edhi took over as head of the Edhi Foundation.

Over his lifetime, the Edhi Foundation expanded, backed entirely by private donations from Pakistani citizens across class, which included establishing a network of 1,800 ambulances. By the time of his death, Edhi was registered as a parent or guardian of nearly 20,000 adopted children. He is known amongst Pakistanis as the "Angel of Mercy" and is considered to be Pakistan's most respected and legendary figure. In 2013, The Huffington Post claimed that he might be "the world's greatest living humanitarian" and was later on named Pakistan's Father Teresa.

Edhi maintained a hands-off management style and was often critical of the corruption commonly found within the religious organizations, clergy and politicians. He was a strong proponent of religious tolerance in Pakistan and extended his support to the victims of Hurricane Katrina and the 1985 famine in Ethiopia. He was nominated several times for the Nobel Peace Prize. Edhi received several domestic as well as international awards such as Ramon Magsaysay Award and the UNESCO-Madanjeet Singh Prize.

He died in July 2016 and was buried with full state honours.

== Early life ==
Edhi was born into a Memon Muslim family in Bantva, Gujarat, British India. He publicly expressed that he was not a "very religious person", and that he was "neither for religion or against it". On his faith, he stated that he was a "humanitarian", telling others that "empty words and long phrases do not impress God" and asked them to "show Him your faith" through action.

== Edhi Foundation and Bilquis Edhi Trust ==
Edhi dedicated his life to aiding the poor. Over the course of sixty years, he single-handedly changed the face of welfare in Pakistan. He founded the Edhi Foundation. Edhi was known for his ascetic lifestyle, owning only two pairs of clothes, never taking salary from his organization, and living in one room with kitchenette at the Foundation's headquarters in the heart of Karachi. Additionally, his previously established welfare trust, named the Edhi Trust, was restarted with an initial sum of Rs.5000. The trust was later renamed after his wife as the Bilquis Edhi Trust. Widely regarded and respected as a guardian and savior for the poor, Edhi began receiving numerous donations which allowed him to expand his services. As of 2016, the Edhi Foundation continues to grow in both size and service and currently remains the largest welfare organization in Pakistan. Since its inception, the Edhi Foundation has rescued over 20,000 abandoned infants, rehabilitated over 50,000 orphans, and has trained over 40,000 nurses. It also runs more than 330 welfare centres throughout rural and urban Pakistan that operate as food kitchens, rehabilitation homes, shelters for abandoned women and children, and clinics for the mentally and physically challenged.

The Edhi Foundation is funded entirely by private donations and full services are offered to people irrespective of ethnicity, religion or status. It runs the world's largest volunteer ambulance service (operating over 1,500 of them) and offers 24-hour emergency services. It also operates free nursing homes, orphanages, clinics, women's shelters, and rehabilitation centres for drug addicts and the mentally ill. Outside of its main base of operations in Pakistan, the Edhi Foundation has run relief operations in South Asia, the Middle East, Africa, the Caucasus region, Eastern Europe, and the United States. In 2005, the foundation donated US$100,000 to relief efforts after Hurricane Katrina. As of 2020, the Foundation has international head offices present in the United States, United Kingdom, United Arab Emirates, Canada, Australia, Nepal, Bangladesh, India and Japan.

In 2004, Edhi and his organization ran into trouble with Pakistani militants. In 2014, the foundation was targeted and robbed of approximately US$500,000 and has been the victim of right-wing attacks and competition from Pakistan's militant far-right

=== Travel issues ===
In the early 1980s, Edhi was arrested by Israeli troops while he was entering Lebanon. In 2006, he was detained by authorities in Toronto, Canada, for over sixteen hours. In January 2008, U.S. immigration officials at the John F. Kennedy International Airport in New York City investigated him for over eight hours after seizing his passport and other documents. When asked by media officials about the frequent detentions, Edhi said: "The only explanation I can think of is my beard and my dress." His appearance in traditional Pakistani clothing and a long beard made him appear visibly Muslim and therefore, in a post-9/11 climate, prompted U.S. and Canadian travel authorities to keep him for additional questioning.

== Life in Karachi ==
In 1965, Edhi married Bilquis Bano, a nurse who worked at an Edhi Trust dispensary. They had four children, two daughters, and two sons.

Bilquis became responsible for running the free maternity home at the foundation's headquarters in Mithandar, Karachi, where she raised her children on the top floor, and on the lower floors, ran the local delivery room, and organised the adoption of abandoned babies. These were babies who were dropped into a cradle placed outside every Edhi centre across the country or found dumped in trash piles in the streets. Often such babies were otherwise at risk of being killed because of being born out of wedlock or due to rape.

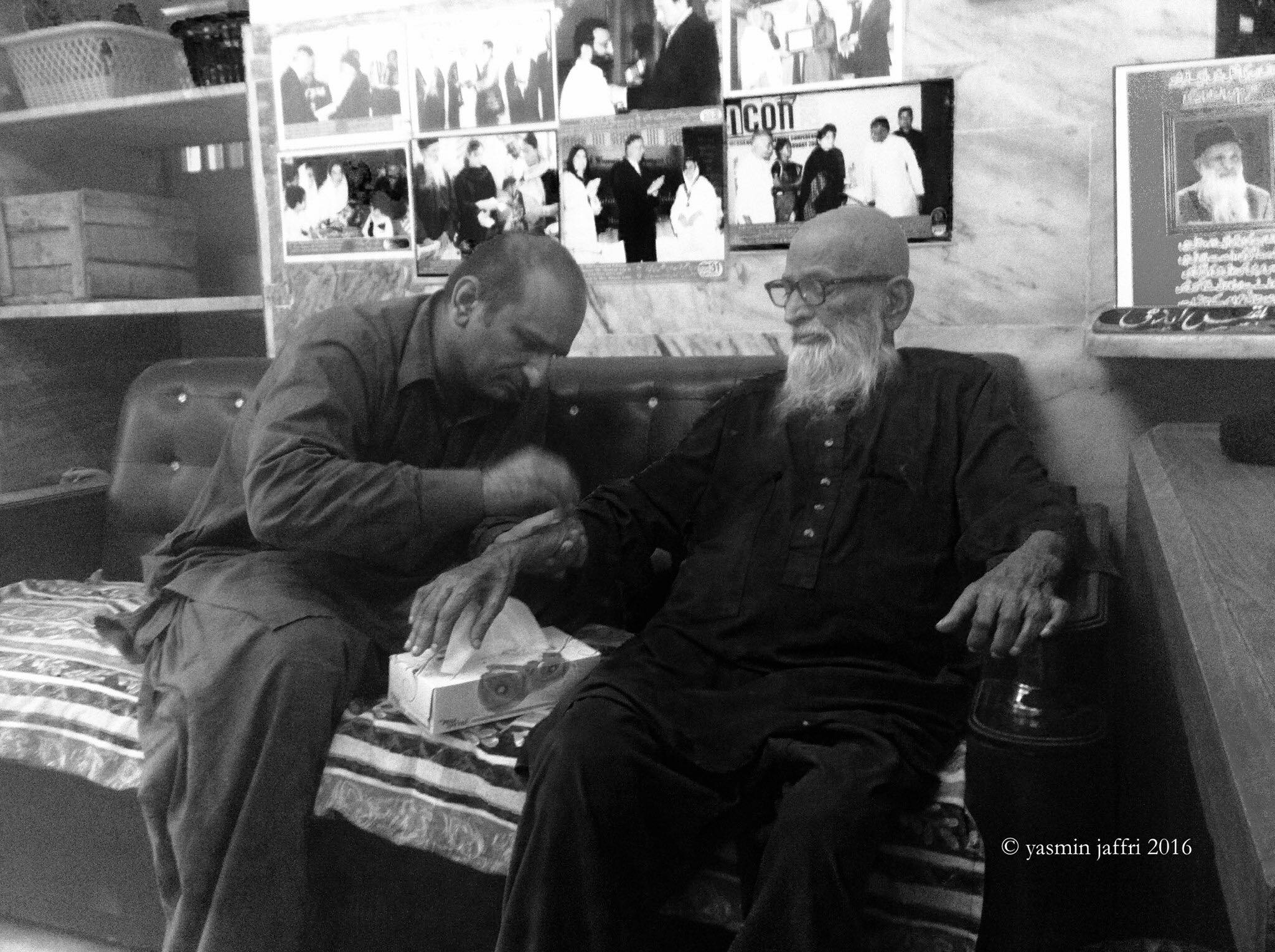
Edhi with son Faisal in 2016

On 25 June 2013, Edhi was hospitalised at SIUT due to failing kidneys. He would reportedly be on dialysis for the rest of his life unless he found a kidney donor.

The daily operations of the organisation during his ill health and after his passing were managed by his son Faisal Edhi (under the mentorship of Anwar Kazmi, 'the Maulana's Lieutenant', as his friend Eqbal Ahmad called him), wife Bilquis Edhi (1947-2022), and daughter Kubra (who runs the Edhi centre for women and children at Clifton).

== Death ==
=== Organ donation ===
Edhi died on 8 July 2016, at the age of 88, due to kidney failure after having been placed on a ventilator. One of his last wishes was that his organs be donated for the use of the needy but due to his poor health, only his corneas were suitable for donation. In accordance with his wishes, his corneas were donated to two blind people.

=== State funeral ===
Prime Minister Nawaz Sharif declared national mourning on the day following Edhi's death and announced a state funeral for him. He became the third person in Pakistan's history to receive a state gun carriage funeral after Muhammad Ali Jinnah and Zia-ul-Haq. He was the only Pakistani without a state authority or a state role to receive a state funeral. According to the Inter-Services Public Relations (ISPR), state honors were given to Edhi by a guard of honor and a 19-gun salute. Following the funeral he was laid to rest at Edhi Village on the outskirts of Karachi.

=== Condolences ===
The attendees at his Janazah (Islamic funeral prayer) included dignitaries such as Mamnoon Hussain (President of Pakistan), Raza Rabbani (Chairman of the Senate of Pakistan), Ishratul Ibad (Governor of Sindh), Syed Qaim Ali Shah and Shehbaz Sharif (the Chief Ministers of Sindh and Punjab, respectively), Raheel Sharif (Chief of Army Staff) along with Muhammad Zakaullah and Sohail Aman (the Chiefs of Staff of the Pakistani Navy and Air Force), at the National Stadium, Karachi. Prominent Pakistani figures such as Maulana Tariq Jamil and Pakistani−Canadian Sheikh Faraz Rabbani often expressed their strong support for Edhi and his work.

Reactions to his death came from several high-ranking Pakistani officials, with then-Prime Minister Nawaz Sharif saying in an official statement: "We have lost a great servant of humanity. He was the real manifestation of love for those who were socially vulnerable, impoverished, helpless, and poor." Chief of Army Staff Raheel Sharif called him a "true humanitarian". He was called Pakistan's equivalent of Mother Teresa by India Today in 1990, and the BBC wrote that he was considered "Pakistan's most respected figure and was seen by some as a saint."

== Awards ==
=== International awards ===
- Ramon Magsaysay Award for Public Service (1986)
- Lenin Peace Prize (1988)
- Paul Harris Fellow from Rotary International (1993)
- Peace Prize from the former USSR, for services during the Armenian earthquake disaster (1988)
- Hamdan Award for volunteers in Humanitarian Medical Services (2000), UAE
- International Balzan Prize (2000) for Humanity, Peace and Brotherhood, Italy
- Peace and Harmony Award (2001), Delhi
- Peace Award (2004), Mumbai
- Peace Award (2005), Hyderabad, India
- Seoul Peace Prize (2008), Seoul
- Honorary doctorate from the Institute of Business Administration, Karachi (2006).
- UNESCO-Madanjeet Singh Prize (2009)
- POSCO TJ Park Prize (2009)
- Ahmadiyya Muslim Peace Prize (2010)
- Honorary Doctorate by the University of Bedfordshire (2010)
- London Peace Award (2011), London

=== National awards ===
- Silver Jubilee Shield by College of Physicians and Surgeons (1962–1987)
- Moiz ur Rehman Award (2015)
- The Social Worker of Sub-Continent by Government of Sindh (1989)
- Nishan-e-Imtiaz, civil decoration from the Government of Pakistan (1989)
- Recognition of meritorious services to oppressed humanity during the 1980s by Ministry of Health and Social Welfare, Government of Pakistan (1989)
- Pakistan Civic Award from the Pakistan Civic Society (1992)
- Jinnah Award for Outstanding Services to Pakistan was conferred in April 1998 by The Jinnah Society. This was the first Jinnah Award conferred on any person in Pakistan.
- Shield of Honor by Pakistan Army (E & C)
- Khidmat Award by the Pakistan Academy of Medical Sciences
- Bacha Khan Aman (Peace) Award in 1991
- Human Rights Award by Pakistan Human Rights Society
- 2013 Person of the Year by the readers of The Express Tribune

== Honours ==
On 8 July 2021, a statue of Edhi was installed at Hockey Chowk, Quetta.

On 31 March 2017, a cupronickel commemorative coin was issued upon the recommendation of the State Bank of Pakistan to Prime Minister Nawaz Sharif, who decided to commemorate Edhi's services on the national level. Edhi became the only social worker and the fifth Pakistani personality to have been honoured with a commemorative coin.

On 28 February 2017, Google celebrated Edhi with a Google Doodle hailing his "super-efficient" ambulance service.

In July 2016, the Defence Housing Authority renamed the 5 kilometre-long Beach Avenue in Clifton Beach, Karachi as 'Abdul Sattar Edhi Avenue'.

On 8 July 2016 Pakistan Post issued a commemorative postage stamp in memory of Edhi.

=== Nobel Peace Prize petitions ===
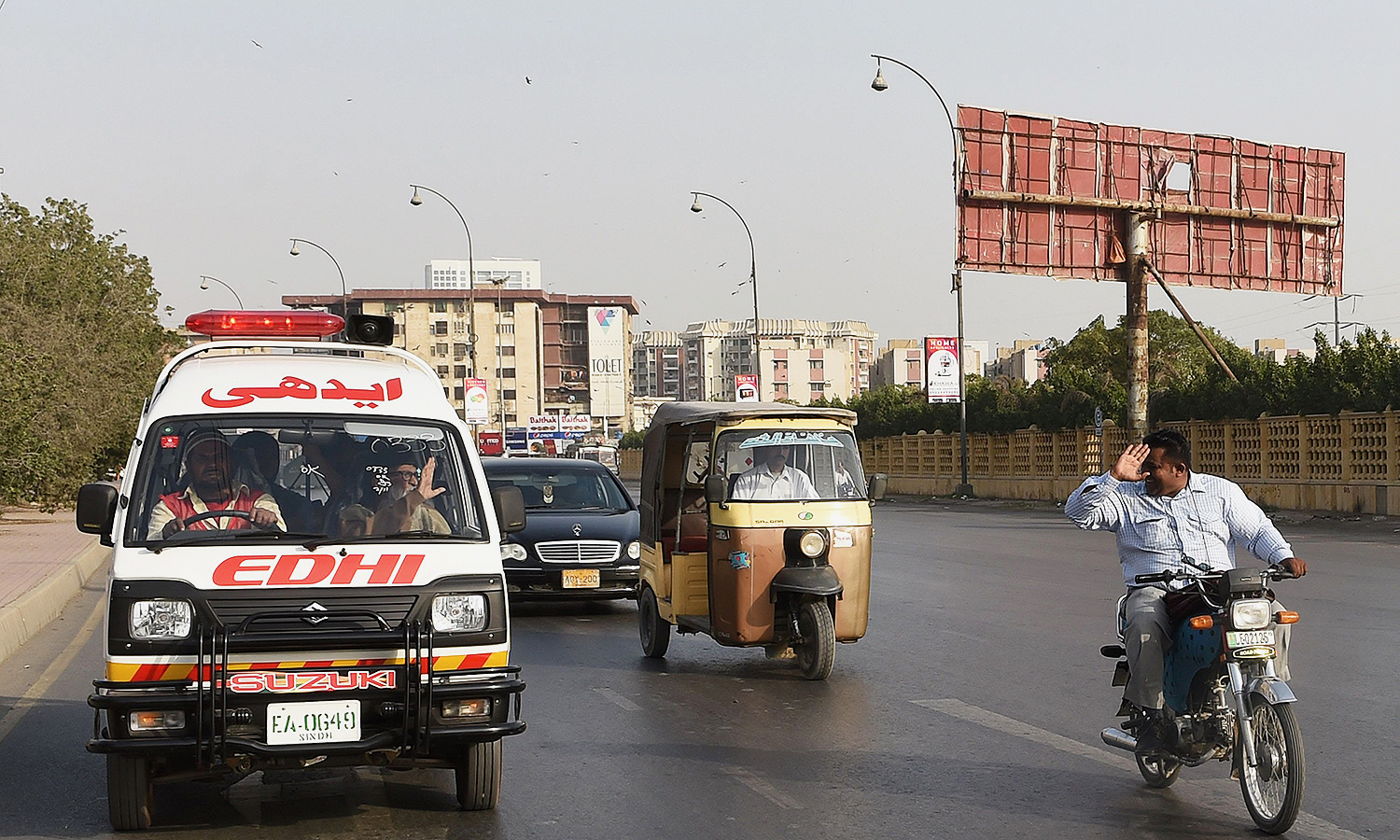
Motorcyclist pays his respects to Abdul Sattar Edhi (2nd on left). Mai Kolachi Road, 15 February 2016

In 2011, then-Prime Minister of Pakistan Yousaf Raza Gilani recommended Edhi for a nomination for the Nobel Peace Prize.

In early 2016, a petition signed by 30,000 for a Nobel Peace Prize for Edhi was moved by Ziauddin Yousafzai, the father of Malala Yousafzai. In her condolence message on Edhi's death, broadcast by BBC Urdu, Malala said that "as a Nobel Peace Prize winner, I hold the right to nominate people for the prize and I have nominated Abdul Sattar Edhi" adding that "even the coveted Nobel Prize cannot be a befitting tribute to Edhi's services for humanity".

== Literature ==
=== Primary ===
Abdul Sattar Edhi (1995), Breaking the Silence. Islamabad: National Bureau of Publications.

Tehmina Durrani (1996) Abdul Sattar Edhi, An Autobiography: A Mirror to the Blind. Karachi: A. Sattar Edhi Foundation.

=== Biography ===
Lorenza Raponi; Michele Zanzucchi (2013), Half of Two Paisas: The Extraordinary Mission of Abdul Sattar Edhi and Bilquis Edhi, Translated from Italian by Lorraine Buckley, Oxford University Press, Pakistan.

=== Popular ===
Steve Inskeep (October 2011), Instant City: Life and Death in Karachi. New York: Penguin Books.

Richard Covington; Shahidul Alam (2008), "What One Person Can Do: The Amazing Life of Abdul Sattar Edhi". In: What Matters: The World's Preeminent Photojournalists and Thinkers Depict Essential Issues of Our Time edited by David Elliot Cohen.

Richard Covington; Shahidul Alam (2004) Humanitarian to a Nation: Abdul Sattar Edhi AramcoWorld.

=== Children ===
Amina Azfar (2014), Abdul Sattar Edhi. Graphic Stories series (in Urdu and English). Karachi: Oxford University Press.

=== Film ===
Omar Mullick; Bassam Tariq (2013),These Birds Walk.
Amélie Saillez (2011), The Kingdom of Mister Edhi (Lastor Media).
Peter Oborne (2011), Pakistan: Defenders of Karachi (Channel 4, April 2011, directed by Edward Watts, Quicksilver Media).

== See also ==
=== Karachi-based philanthropists ===
- Bilquis Edhi
- Adeebul Hasan Rizvi
- Hakeem Muhammad Saeed
- Ramzan Chhipa
- Saylani Welfare Trust
- Ansar Burney
- Ruth Pfau
