= Edhi Foundation =

Non-profit social welfare organisation in Pakistan

- Abdul Sattar Edhi International Foundation
- ایدھی فاؤنڈیشن
- Founded: 1951; 75 years ago
- Founder: Abdul Sattar Edhi
- Type: Non-profit, volunteer-based
- Purpose: Humanitarian aid, social welfare
- Location: Karachi, Sindh, Pakistan
- Coordinates: 24.8541°N 67.0005°E
- Region served: Primarily South Asia, Africa and the Middle East
- Key people: Faisal Edhi, Chairman; Kubra Edhi, Director
- Website: edhi.org

The Abdul Sattar Edhi International Foundation, commonly known as Edhi Foundation (Urdu: ایدھی فاؤنڈیشن) is a non-profit social welfare organisation based in Pakistan. It was founded by Abdul Sattar Edhi in 1951, who served as the head of the organisation until his death on 8 July 2016. Bilquis Edhi, a nurse by profession, used to oversee the maternity and adoption services of the foundation. The Edhi Foundation is headquartered in the city of Karachi.

The Edhi Foundation provides 24-hour emergency assistance across the entirety of Pakistan and internationally. The foundation provides, among many other services, shelter for the destitute, hospitals and medical care, drug rehabilitation services, and national and international relief efforts. The organisation's main focuses are emergency services, orphans, handicapped persons, women's shelters, education, healthcare, international community centres, refugees, missing persons, blood donation & drug rehabilitation banks, air ambulance services and marine and coastal services. The organisation is known to serve those in need regardless of race, religious affiliation, and social status, and runs entirely on donations and volunteer efforts. While the Edhi Foundation's primary focus is in Pakistan as well as the rest of South Asia, it has an extensive presence throughout the Middle East and Africa. However, it has also provided financial and supplementary aid to countries in Europe and the Americas in the event of natural disasters (such as Hurricane Katrina in 2005) or other issues. As of 2020, the Edhi Foundation has international head offices present in the United States, United Kingdom, United Arab Emirates, Canada, Australia, Nepal, India, Bangladesh, and Japan.

== History ==
In 1928, Abdul Sattar Edhi was born in Bantva, a town in the princely state of Bantva Manavadar in British India. In 1939, when he was 11 years old, Edhi's mother suffered a major stroke and became physically and mentally disabled. Shortly after this, Edhi dropped out of school to provide full-time care to his mother. At home, he would cater to her needs by bathing her, taking her to the bathroom, feeding her, and much more. He dedicated the following years of his life caring for her until she died in early 1947. Later that year, during the Partition of India, Edhi and his family fled to the newly established Dominion of Pakistan and settled down in Karachi. The combined experiences of caring for his mother as well as seeing the death and destruction due to the partition motivated Edhi to pursue the establishment of a major humanitarian organisation in Pakistan. By 1951, he had bought a small shop in Karachi and opened a free dispensary to aid those in need of humanitarian services. Since then, he began to build up what would eventually become the Edhi Foundation. He established his first welfare centre in 1957 and then the Edhi Trust. Eventually, the Edhi Trust, which functioned on the efforts of a single person and one room became a large nationwide network run on volunteer efforts and donations. The organisation has over 300 centres across the country, being present anywhere from big cities to small towns and remote rural areas, primarily focused on providing medical aid, family planning and emergency assistance. Air ambulances allow the network to operate in and access remote areas.

In Karachi alone, the Edhi Foundation runs eight major hospitals providing free medical care to all, alongside other services and establishments such as eye clinics, diabetic centres, surgical units, a four-bed cancer-focused hospital and mobile aid and relief dispensaries. In addition to these services, the organisation also manages two blood banks. As with other Edhi services, these are run by employed professionals and volunteers. The foundation has a legal aid department, which also provides free services and has secured the release of countless innocent prisoners. Commissioned doctors visit jails on a regular basis and also supply food and other essentials to the inmates. There are 15 operational shelter homes for destitute children, runaways, and psychotics.

On 25 June 2013, Edhi's kidneys failed, with doctors announcing that he would be on dialysis for the rest of his life unless he found an appropriate kidney donor. Three years later, on 8 July 2016, Edhi died at the age of 88 due to kidney failure after having been placed on a ventilator. His last wishes included a request that his organs be donated to those in need but due to his poor health and failing organs, only his corneas were suitable for donation. Edhi was given a state funeral and thousands gathered to mourn his death as he was laid to rest in Edhi Village, Karachi.

The Edhi Foundation also has an extensive education program, which not only provides services related to standard education but also in vocational activities such as driving, pharmacy and para-medical training. The emphasis and goal of this program is to propel those who are suffering from a nearly unbreakable cycle of poverty into a life of self-sufficiency. The foundation has branches in several countries where they provide relief to refugees and citizens in need in the United States, United Kingdom, Canada, Japan, and Bangladesh. Following the end of the Gulf War in 1991, the foundation provided aid and rehabilitation to the citizens of Kuwait and Iraq. It has also run major relief operations for earthquake victims in Iran and Egypt. The organisation has held the Guinness World Record for being the "world's largest volunteer ambulance organization" since 1997. In 2016, after the death of Abdul Sattar Edhi, the State Bank of Pakistan urged all banks around the country to donate to the Edhi Foundation.

== Services ==
The Edhi Foundation provides a number of services, emergency and non-emergency, to the general public. In addition to emergency medical services and private ambulance services, the organisation also renders aid to women and children in need, assists with missing persons cases, and helps in covering burial and graveyard costs of unclaimed and unidentified bodies during times of disaster and tragedy.

=== Ambulance services ===
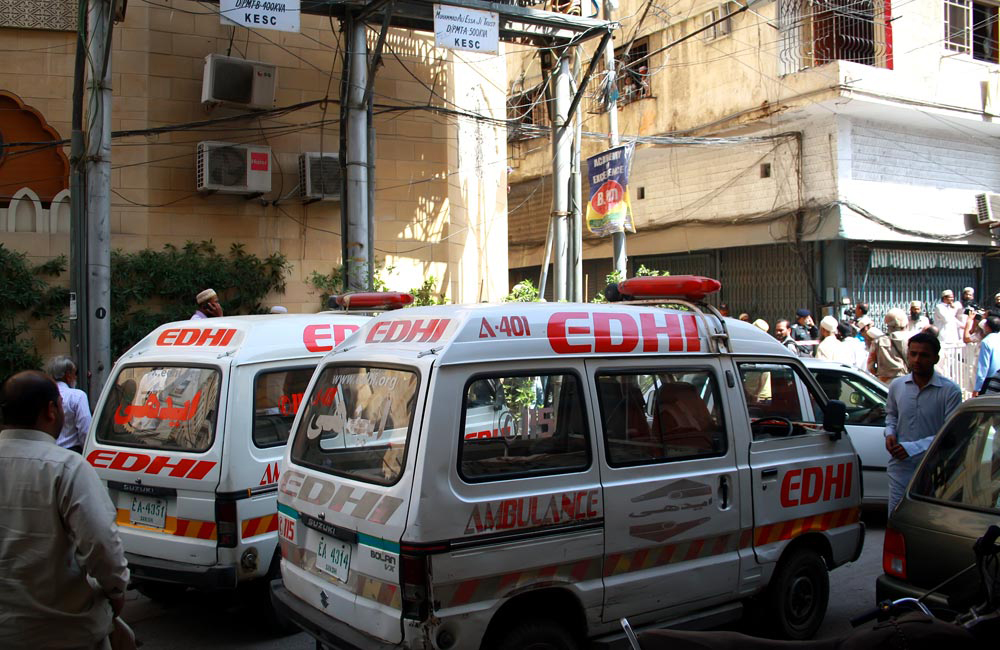
Ambulance of the foundation.

As of March 2021, the Edhi Foundation owns over 5,000 private ambulance vans stationed in areas across Pakistan. The ambulance dispatchers in Karachi, one of the busiest cities in Pakistan, have reported up to 6,000 calls a day, with the average response time for each incident falling within 10 minutes. It was also an Edhi ambulance which responded to and picked up the body of the American journalist, Daniel Pearl, when he was killed in 2002.

The organisation also owns two private jets and one helicopter to assist in moving victims from hard-to-reach locations, especially during the event of a natural disaster. In addition to land and air assistance, Edhi Foundation also hosts 28 rescue boats to aid during floods and in cases of shipwrecks and disaster along the Arabian Ocean coast.

=== Hospital services ===
The organisation runs several private outpatient hospitals located in Pakistan. Additional medical facilities include a diabetic center, a nurse training center, immunisation centers, and blood banks, including emergency banks during times of natural disasters or tragedies.

=== Childcare services ===
Bilquis Edhi, co-head of the Edhi Foundation, is responsible for overseeing children's and women's services within the organisation. Services he heads currently for children include the jhoola project, a child adoption center, and an abandoned children's welfare center. Bachhay Ka Jhoola is the Urdu word for "cradle for child", and refers to a baby hatch for abandoned children. Most of the Edhi emergency centers have a jhoola located outside the venue for mothers to leave their infants, regardless of the current situation they may be in. These children are taken into custody and are taken care of, often being adopted by pre-screened families.

== International services ==
The Edhi Foundation has reached out to international communities and assisted with the setup of several offices overseas which assist with donations, fundraising, and especially financially aiding Pakistanis who have to be flown overseas for urgent medical attention. In addition to providing their regular services, the overseas foundation offices often help with community needs as necessary. In 2005, the Edhi Foundation provided $100,000 in aid to relief efforts following Hurricane Katrina.

In March 2020, the organisation donated US$200,000 to the Iranian government to help it combat the Coronavirus epidemic plaguing the country.

On April 23, 2021, Faisal Edhi, the head of the organisation has offered to help India fight the Covid-19 pandemic by writing a letter to Prime Minister of India Narendra Modi. He requested for permission to enter India with a team of volunteers and 50 ambulances to help assist India in the pandemic as the country is facing nationwide oxygen shortage.

== Popularity in media and memorial ==
On 28 February 2017, Google celebrated Abdul Sattar Edhi with a Google Doodle hailing his "super-efficient" ambulance service.

On 1 April 2017, the State Bank of Pakistan unveiled a Rs50 coin in honour of Abdul Sattar Edhi.

Karachi's Beach Avenue on DHA phase VII has been renamed as "Abdus Sattar Edhi Avenue".

== See also ==
- List of non-governmental organizations in Pakistan
- Abdul Sattar Edhi
- Bilquis Edhi
- Saylani Welfare Trust
