= Pakistan Centre for Philanthropy =

Pakistani not-for-profit organisation in Islamabad

- مرکز فلاحِ انسانیت پاکستان
- Founded: 2001; 25 years ago
- Type: Non-profit
- Purpose: Philanthropy
- Location: RDF Centre, 31 Mauve Area G-9/1, Islamabad, Pakistan
- Coordinates: 33.4038410°N 73.148889°E.
- Region served: Pakistan
- Key people: Zaffar A. Khan (Chairman), Shazia M. Maqsood (Executive Director)
- Employees: 243
- Website: Pakistan Centre for Philanthropy (PCP)

The Pakistan Centre for Philanthropy (PCP) is an independent not-for-profit support organisation based in Islamabad, Pakistan. Founded in 2001, PCP is promoting indigenous philanthropy for social development across the country, and is probably the first philanthropy-support organisation in the Islamic world.

PCP functions as the umbrella organisation of not-for-profit organisations. It conducts performance evaluation of not-for-profit organisations on behalf the Federal Board of Revenue (FBR) of the Government of Pakistan. It is a designated certification agency, which is insofar important, as not-for-profit organisations working in the country are required to seek approval of the Commissioner of Inland Revenue for their official recognition. Only with the approval these organisations can avail other tax benefits including tax credit and exemption. By early 2021, PCP had certified more than 1200 organisations across Pakistan.

PCP promotes altruistic efforts of national and international philanthropists, including the Pakistani diaspora, and establishing linkages between grant-maker and not-for-profit organisations. PCP's Corporate Philanthropy Survey reports the corporate philanthropy of publicly listed companies.

PCP is also organised in regional and global activities to promote philanthropy. The international networking includes the Asia Pacific Philanthropy Consortium, Global Philanthropy Forum, CIVICUS, The Asia Foundation, Give2Asia, Global Giving and Pearson's Fund.
