= Anarkali (disambiguation) =

Anarkali was a legendary slave girl and courtesan from the Mughal period.

Anarkali may also refer to:

- Anarkali, a 1922 play by Urdu writer Imtiaz Ali Taj about the courtesan, adapted numerous times (see below) including the classic Indian film Mughal-e-Azam (1960)

== Films ==
- Anarkali (1928 film), a 1928 silent film by R. S. Choudhury, starring Ruby Myers a.k.a. Sulochana
- Anarkali (1953 film), a 1953 Hindi film starring Pradeep Kumar, Bina Rai, and Noor Jehan
- Anarkali (1955 film), a 1955 Telugu film starring Akkineni Nageswara Rao and Anjali Devi
- Anarkali (1958 film), a 1958 Pakistani film starring Noor Jehan and Sudhir
- Anarkali (1966 film), a 1966 Malayalam film starring Prem Nazir, K. R. Vijaya, and Sathyan
- Anarkali (2015 film), a 2015 Malayalam film

== People ==
- Anarkali Akarsha, a Sri Lankan actress
- Anarkali Kaur Honaryar, an Afghan politician and a women's rights activist

== Places ==
- Tomb of Anarkali, a tomb in Lahore, thought to be that of either Anarkali, or Sahib-i-Jamal Begum
- Anarkali Bazaar, a market located near Anarkali's tomb on Mall Road in Lahore

== Clothing ==
- Anarkali salwar suit, a type of shalwar kameez among kathak dancers in India

== See also ==
- Anarkali of Aarah, a 2007 Indian film
