= Veneranda Nzambazamariya =

Rwandan peace activist

- Born: August 27, 1957; Rwanda
- Died: January 30, 2000 (aged 42); Côte d'Ivoire
- Awards: Millennium Peace Prize for Women

Veneranda Nzambazamariya (August 8, 1957 – January 30, 2000) was a Rwandan peace advocate, women's rights leader, and humanitarian. She played a significant role in post-genocide Rwanda by uniting women across ethnic and social divides to support reconciliation and community rebuilding. As the president of Pro-Femmes/Twese Hamwe, Nzambazamariya emphasized local activism and gender inclusion in peacebuilding efforts.

== Personal life ==
Veneranda Nzambazamariya was born in Rwanda on August 8, 1957, and died on January 30, 2000. While details about her early life are limited, she pursued education and became involved in civil society organizations, which influenced her work in promoting gender equality and peacebuilding.

Nzambazamariya was known for connecting people from different backgrounds, which became significant during Rwanda's post-genocide recovery. Her work reflected a commitment to fostering dialogue and inclusivity. She also mentored younger generations, emphasizing the importance of education and civic engagement in building a more equitable society. Nzambazamariya was a women's leader in Rwanda. She was posthumously awarded the Millennium Peace Prize for Women.

== Humanitarian work ==
As previously stated, Nzambazamariya was known for facilitating connections with people from various backgrounds, and her humanitarian work throughout her lifetime further exemplified this narrative. Nzambazamariya was immensely passionate about extending kindness and support to others in need, and her multiple works helped support several widows, orphans, and displaced persons in post-genocide Rwanda. As president of Pro-Femmes, she oversaw microcredit programs, agricultural cooperatives, and literacy training to promote economic empowerment and social reintegration for women.

Nzambazamirya was a founding member of Reseau de Femmes and Pro-Femmes Twese Hamwe, two women's organizations in her home in Rwanda. Nzambazamariya was also a committed Women's Committee for Peace and Development member. Additionally, Nzambazamirya dedicated her life to empowering women politically and economically and aspired to reconstruct Rwanda's laws and infrastructures that economically, politically, and socially disproportionately affected women.

== Awards ==
The Millennium Peace Prize for Women, established in 2001, was an initiative to honor women who made significant contributions to peacebuilding and conflict resolution worldwide. This prize was organized by the United Nations Development Fund for Women (UNIFEM, now UN Women). It highlighted the often-overlooked role of women in promoting peace, addressing violence, and rebuilding communities in post-conflict settings.

Nzambazamariya became the first recipient of the Millennium Peace Prize for Women. The award celebrated her visionary leadership in fostering reconciliation, particularly through Pro-Femmes/Twese Hamwe's "Campaign Action for Peace." This initiative mobilized women to take active roles in conflict resolution and the Gacaca courts, reshaping traditional gender roles in Rwanda.

Her work exemplified the transformative power of grassroots efforts in post-conflict settings, inspiring future global frameworks for gender-inclusive peacebuilding.

== Death and legacy ==
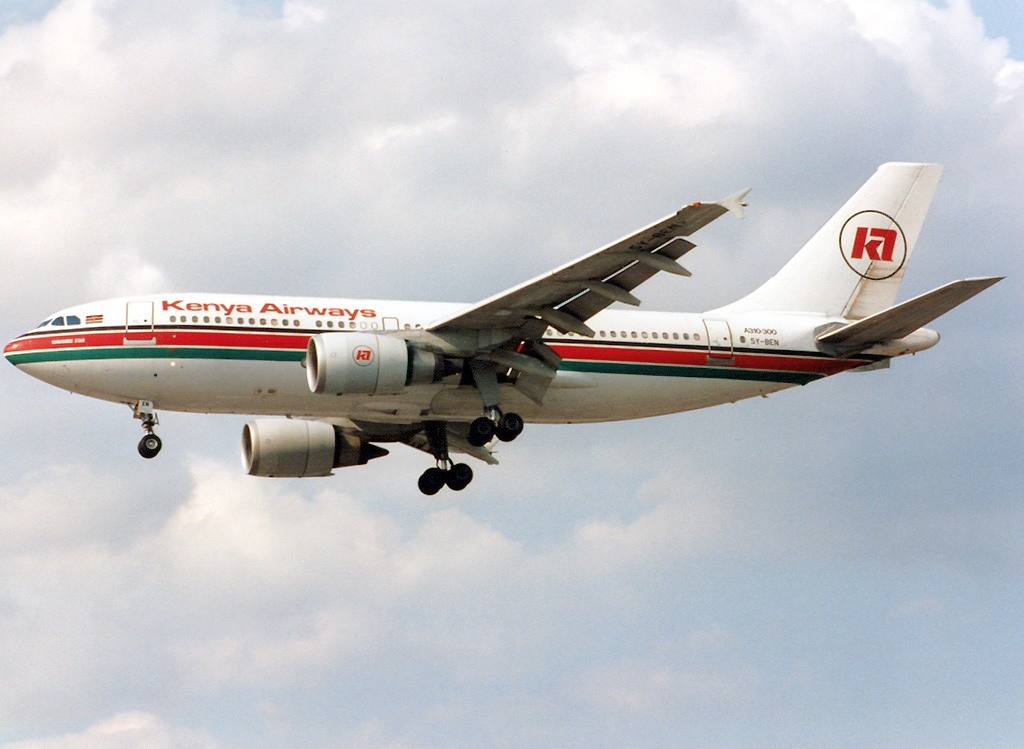
Kenya Airways Flight 431: Veneranda Nzambazamariya died on this flight due to its crash.

Veneranda Nzambazamariya died on January 30, 2000, in the Kenya Airways Flight 431 crash near Côte d'Ivoire. Her death marked a profound loss for Rwanda and the global peacebuilding community. As the president of Pro-Femmes/Twese Hamwe—a coalition of Rwandan women's organizations—Nzambazamariya was instrumental in uniting women across social and ethnic divides during Rwanda's post-genocide reconstruction.

Since Nzambazamariya's passing, her legacy has continued through the Nzambazamariya Veneranda Organization, which was founded in her honor in 2000. The organization focuses on promoting a culture of peace, justice, and sustainable development based on the philosophy of Ubuntu. Led by Izabiriza M. Médiatrice, the association has implemented numerous projects to empower rural women, combat family conflict, and address poverty, while also recognizing individuals who contribute to community well-being.

Nzambazamariya's commitment to peace and justice is remembered annually on January 30 by her family and the organization founded in her name. Her grave at Remera Cemetery serves as a gathering place for commemorative ceremonies where family and organizational members honor her memory by laying flowers and reflecting on her contributions to Rwandan society.
