= Tim Holmes =

Tim Holmes may refer to:

- Tim Holmes (artist), American artist and sculptor
- Tim Holmes (actor), American actor and musician

== See also ==
- Timothy Holmes, English surgeon
- TJ Holmes (athlete) (Timothy Lamont Holmes), American hurdler
