= Millennium Peace Prize for Women =

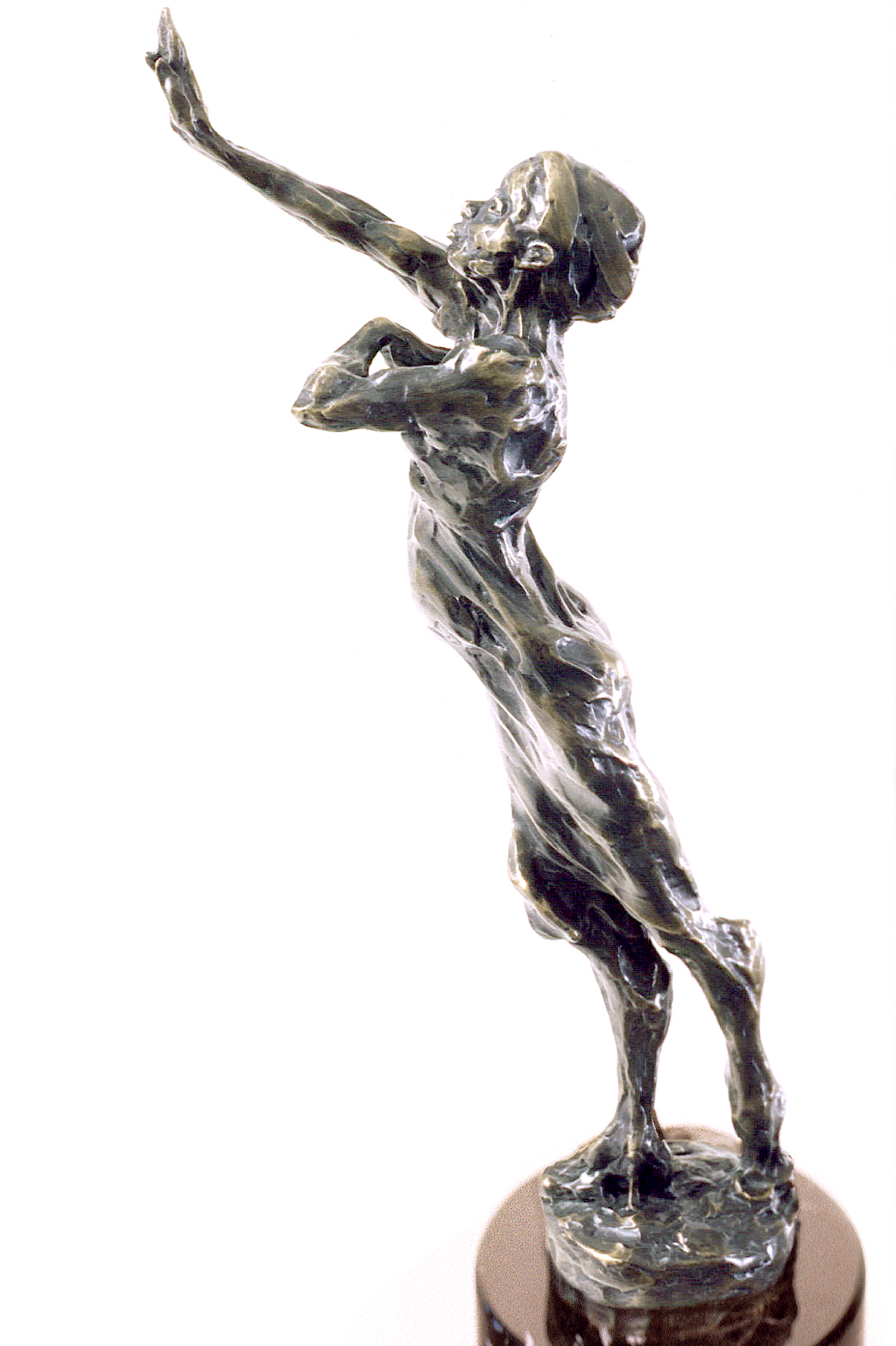
- Anima Mundi, the award sculpture, by Tim Holmes
- Awarded for: Efforts to end conflict
- Sponsored by: United Nations Development Fund for Women (UNIFEM); International Alert
- Presented by: Dana Reeve
- First award: 2001

In 2001, as part of International Alert's Women Building Peace campaign, the United Nations Development Fund for Women awarded a Millennium Peace Prize for Women. The bronze prize was commissioned from American figurative sculptor Tim Holmes, who has created several such international awards. The sculpture, entitled Anima Mundi, depicts a woman whose facial features combine elements of many races, reaching and striding forward, hand on heart.

== Winners ==
The United Nations announced the following winners:

Year	Category	Recipient	Nation
2001	Individuals	Flora Brovina	Kosovo
2001	Individuals	Asma Jahangir	Pakistan
2001	Individuals	Hina Jilani	Pakistan
2001	Individuals	Veneranda Nzambazamariya	Rwanda
2001	Groups	Ruta Pacifica de las Mujeres	Colombia
2001	Groups	Leitana Nehan Women's Development Agency	Papua New Guinea
2001	Groups	Women in Black	International

== Ceremony ==
A ceremony honoring the women and distributing the prize sculptures was held on International Women's Day, March 8, 2001 at the United Nations headquarters in New York City. Many of the women recognized shared their powerful stories of reconciliation in the face of violence. Individual awardees included Veneranda Nzambazamariya, recognized for the reconciliation she brought about as president of Pro-femmes Twese Hamwe, a collective of 32 women's organizations in Rwanda. The group was assembled shortly after the April 1994 massacre of Tutsis and sympathetic Hutus that resulted in one million deaths and the creation of more than two million refugees. Flora Brovina, president of the League of Albanian Women of Kosova, was honored for establishing a center that cared for women and children fleeing Kosovo during the Serbian occupation. In April 1999 she was arrested by the Serbian military for gathering food, clothes, and medical supplies for the Kosovo Liberation Army. (She was released in November 2000.) Pakistani human rights activists Asma Jahangir and Hina Jilani, were honored for helping to bring a feminist solution to the bitter conflict between India and Pakistan over Kashmir.

Two groups also won awards. Ruta Pacifica de las Mujeres, from Colombia, was acknowledged for teaching coexistence strategies to rural and professional women. The group also organizes women's marches, calling for peaceful resolutions to ongoing conflicts. And Leitana Nehan Women's Development Agency won an award for providing humanitarian relief to the women and children victimized by the nine-year war between Bougainville rebels and the Papua New Guinea military. Leitana Nehan also provides training in conflict resolution, promotes HIV/AIDS awareness, and teaches tactics to end violence against women.

== See also ==
- List of awards honoring women
