= UNESCO-Madanjeet Singh Prize =

The UNESCO-Madanjeet Singh Prize for the Promotion of Tolerance and Non-Violence is a prize awarded every two years by UNESCO. It was inaugurated in 1996, following the 1995 United Nations Year for Tolerance and in connection with the 125th anniversary of the birth of Mohandas Gandhi, funded by a donation from Madanjeet Singh.

The purpose of the prize is to honour and reward extraordinary creative achievements in promoting tolerance, as notable models for others in the field of peace-building. Impact assessment is a part of the nomination and evaluation process.

== Background ==
The UNESCO-Madanjeet Singh Prize for the Promotion of Tolerance and Non-Violence prize is dedicated to advancing the spirit of tolerance and nonviolence in the arts, education, culture, science and communication.

"We, the peoples of the United Nations determined to save succeeding generations from the scourge of war,... to reaffirm faith in fundamental human rights, in the dignity and worth of the human person,... and for these ends, to practise tolerance and live together in peace with one another as good neighbours" Charter of the United Nations

In 1945, the founders of the United Nations looked to tolerance as a key to peaceful coexistence for the peoples of the world. Their cautionary words are as true in our own time.

In 1995, the United Nations Educational, Scientific and Cultural Organization led a worldwide mobilization in favor of tolerance, non-violence and appreciation of cultural diversity. The UN's fiftieth anniversary year was declared the United Nations Year for Tolerance. The Year's calendar of events included regional conferences and intergovernmental dialogue, concerts, film and theatre festivals, essay and poster contests, broadcasts and publications of all kinds, in partnership with regional and non-governmental organizations. In 1996, an equally dynamic follow-up programme to the Year got underway.

In the frame of the Year, and in connection with the 125th anniversary of the birth of Mohandas Gandhi, UNESCO established a new international award, the UNESCO-Madanjeet Singh Prize for the Promotion of Tolerance and Non-Violence.

This prize of US$100,000 is awarded once every two years for exceptional contributions and leadership in the field of tolerance promotion. The winner may be either an individual or an institution. Writers, educators, artists, scientists, statesmen, pioneering institutions and leaders of public opinion - all these and others may be nominated. The prize may also be awarded to the families of outstanding individuals who have lost their lives in the struggle against intolerance.

The prize was made possible by the generous donation of the Indian artist, writer and diplomat Madanjeet Singh, who is also Goodwill Ambassador of UNESCO. Mr Singh was a follower of Mahatma Gandhi, and served nine months in Mirzapur jail during the "Quit India" movement against British colonial rule. He received the Indian Government's "Tamra Patra" Freedom Fighter award in 1972. In addition to a distinguished career in diplomacy and the arts, he has authored numerous books on topics ranging from Himalayan art to solar energy.

== Purpose ==
The purpose of the prize is to honour and reward extraordinary creative achievements in tolerance promotion. The emphasis is on achievement. The ultimate aim is to draw attention to successful undertakings that may serve as models for others in the field of tolerance and peace-building. The prize thus recognizes effectiveness as well as vision; impact assessment is a part of the nomination and evaluation process.

== Nominations ==
Nominations of candidates are accepted from UNESCO Member State governments and National Commissions, as well as from intergovernmental and non-governmental organizations affiliated with UNESCO. Prizewinners are chosen by the UNESCO Director-General upon the recommendation of a jury composed of prominent international personalities.

The prize is awarded every two years on 16 November, the annual International Day for Tolerance.

== Prize ==
In 1996, the Prize was awarded to the association of 32 non-governmental women's organizations Pro-femmes Twese Hamwe ("All Together") of Rwanda. The two laureates in 1998 were the educator and peace activist Narayan Desai of India and the Joint Action Committee for Peoples Rights of Pakistan. In 2000, the laureate was Pope Shenouda III, the head of Egypt's Coptic Orthodox Church. Aung San Suu Kyi of Myanmar was named laureate in 2002. In 2004, the laureate was Taslima Nasreen, writer from Bangladesh. The 2006 Prize was awarded to Veerasingham Anandasangaree from Sri Lanka, President of the Tamil United Liberation Front (TULF) for being a "tireless defender of democracy and peaceful conflict resolution [who] has helped improve knowledge of the Tamul cause, through dialogue, through the promotion of non-violent solutions in Sri Lanka and by taking a stand against terrorism." The 2009 Prize was awarded to François Houtart for "his life-long commitment to world peace, intercultural dialogue, human rights and the promotion of tolerance, and in recognition of his outstanding efforts to advance the cause of social justice in the world" and Abdul Sattar Edhi for "his life-long efforts to ameliorate the conditions of the most disadvantaged groups in Pakistan and South Asia, and to promote the ideals of human dignity, human rights, mutual respect and tolerance."

== Laureates ==
Year	Recipient	Country
1996	Pro-femmes Twese Hamwe	Rwanda
1998	Narayan Desai	India
1998	Joint Action Committee for People's Rights	Pakistan
2000	Pope Shenouda III	Egypt
2002	Aung San Suu Kyi	Myanmar
2004	Taslima Nasreen	Bangladesh
2006	Veerasingham Anandasangaree	Sri Lanka
2009	François Houtart	Belgium
2009	Abdul Sattar Edhi	Pakistan
2011	Anarkali Kaur Honaryar	Afghanistan
2011	Khaled Abu Awwad	Palestine
2014	Ibrahim Ag Idbaltanat	Mali
2014	Francisco Javier Estevez Valencia	Chile
2016	Federal Research and Methodological Center for Tolerance, Psychology and Education	Russia
2018	Ms Manon Barbeau, Canadian filmmaker & President and Founder of Wapikoni Mobile	Canada
2018	The Coexist Initiative, Kenyan NGO	Kenya
2020	Centre Résolution Conflits	Democratic Republic of Congo
2022	Franca Ma-ih Sulem Yong	Cameroon
