= Leitana Nehan Women's Development Agency =

Leitana Nehan Women's Development Agency (LNWDA) is a non-governmental organization based in Bougainville, Papua New Guinea, dedicated to providing humanitarian aid, rehabilitation, and promoting women's rights in the aftermath of the Bougainville Civil War. Founded in 1992 by Helen Hakena, the organization focuses on peacebuilding and ending violence against women and children. In 2001, LNWDA was awarded the Millennium Peace Prize for Women by the United Nations Development Fund for Women (UNIFEM).

== See also ==
- Millennium Peace Prize for Women
- Bougainville conflict
- Women in war
