= Ruta Pacifica de las Mujeres =

Ruta Pacífica de las Mujeres (English: Peaceful Route of Women) is a Colombian feminist and pacifist movement that advocates for a negotiated resolution to the country's internal armed conflict and the active participation of women in peacebuilding processes. In 2001, the organization was awarded the Millennium Peace Prize for Women by UNIFEM in recognition of its efforts to promote non-violent resistance and women's rights.
