= Tim Holmes (artist) =

American sculptor, filmmaker, and musician

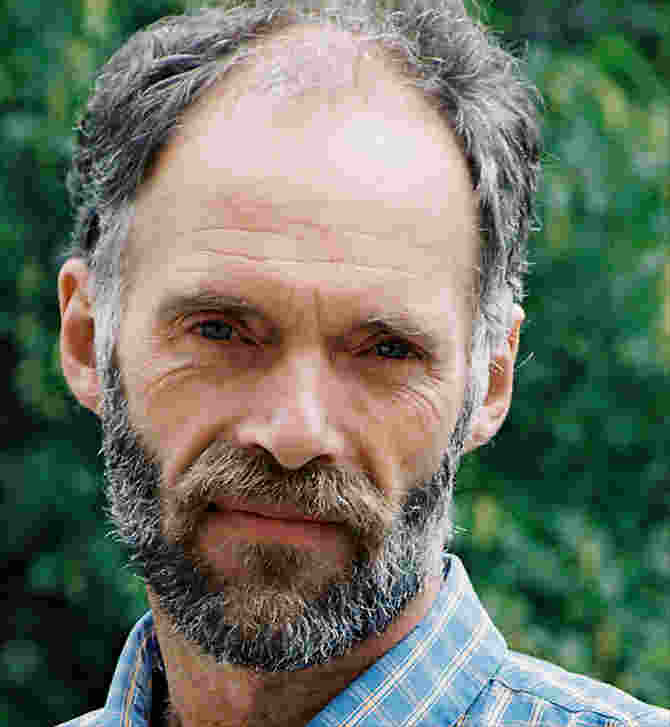
- Holmes in 2007
- Born: Terrill Holmes; May 8, 1955 (age 71); Rapid City, South Dakota, USA
- Education: Rocky Mountain College; Sir John Cass School of Art
- Occupations: artist, sculptor

Tim Holmes (born May 8, 1955) is an American artist and sculptor based in Helena, Montana.

== Early life and education ==
Holmes was born in Rapid City, South Dakota. His father, Robert Holmes, was a Methodist clergyman and social activist. His mother, Polly Holmes, was a writer and former Montana State Legislator. Holmes began making small metal sculptures at the age of 11 when he purchased his first pair of welding tanks.

Holmes received his BA in Fine Arts at Rocky Mountain College in 1976 and later studied at the Sir John Cass School of Art in London.

== Career ==
Following an exhibition of his sculptures at Seattle's Frye Art Museum in 1991, Holmes was invited to exhibit solo at the Hermitage Museum in Saint Petersburg, Russia. The month-long Hermitage exhibition titled An Emergency of Joy opened on 2 November 1993. Other museums which have exhibited Holmes's work include the Paris Gibson Square Museum of Art in Great Falls, Montana, the Hockaday Museum of Art in Kalispell, Montana and the Holter Museum of Art in Helena, Montana. The 2008 Holter Museum exhibition, Speaking Volumes: Transforming Hate, featured 60 artists who transformed books of hate literature into works of art with a positive message. The exhibition toured to 11 Montana venues followed by a tour throughout the United States

Holmes's 1997 sculpture Welcome Home is installed on Robben Island in South Africa, where Nelson Mandela and other political prisoners were incarcerated during apartheid. Among his smaller bronze sculptures are China Peace, Anima Mundi, and Unfolding Flight. Commissioned by the China Information Center in 1989 to commemorate the Tiananmen Square massacre, China Peace was sold to raise funds for a project to subvert Chinese government censorship. Anima Mundi was created in 2000 for the Millennium Peace Prize for Women sponsored by the United Nations Development Fund and depicts a woman with her arms outstretched. Unfolding Flight depicts a female angel building her own wings in preparation for flight. The sculpture was commissioned for the Freedom to Create Leadership Award for Women.

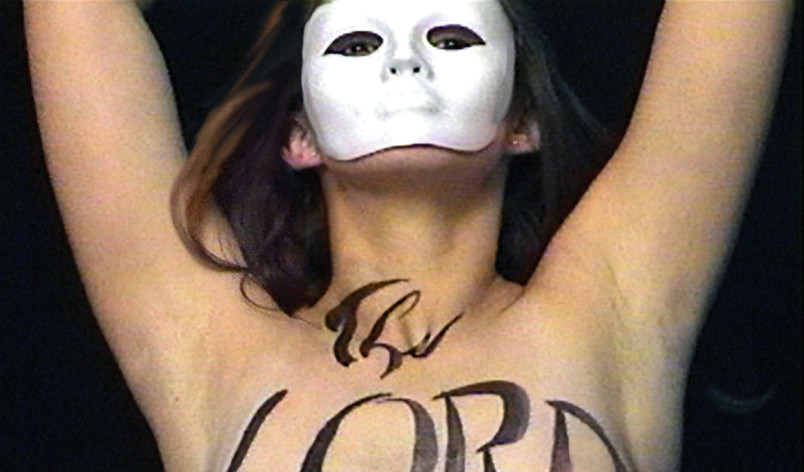
Still from the film The 23rd Psalm in Holmes's Body Psalms project

The Body Psalms project which Holmes began in the early 2000s involves a series of films and performances in which sacred scripts from various religions are written on the human body as a form of "sculptural poetry." Archival objects, preparatory drawings and film footage from the project were exhibited in 2009 at the Paris Gibson Square Museum of Art in The Body Psalms Project: Re-evaluating the Body in a Capitalist World. A documentary film on his art and life, The Moving Art of Tim Holmes, by Austrian filmmaker Karin Wally arose from his work at the Pygmalion Theater in Vienna which incorporated dance, acting, music, film and sculpture in performance.

Holmes partnered in 2012 with speaker and entrepreneur Garret Garrels to create an art project on generosity and reaching out to strangers called Random Gifts of Art, in which Holmes gave Garrels a handful of his original drawings with the instructions to "hand these out to strangers with no strings attached". The project later included a book, a TEDx talk, and a live performance.

In 2013 Holmes launched what he called the "BlueBills" initiative, distributing $1,400 in dollar bills of various denominations which had been dyed blue. He told a local television station, "money only holds the value that we give to it" and that a blue dollar bill "represents the value of a clean environment and healthy community."

In 2016 he was one of six visual artists participating in the NEA-funded project "Reimagine Montana: National Parks, Historic Landmarks, Trails and Monuments Across Time”. The artists were in residence during the summer and autumn of that year creating works that expressed their interpretation of the sites.

Holmes was also a member of the political satire and comedy group the Montana Logging and Ballet Co., who performed and toured from 1975 to 2012. The group's performances were broadcast on National Public Radio and on Montana PBS television.

== Gallery ==
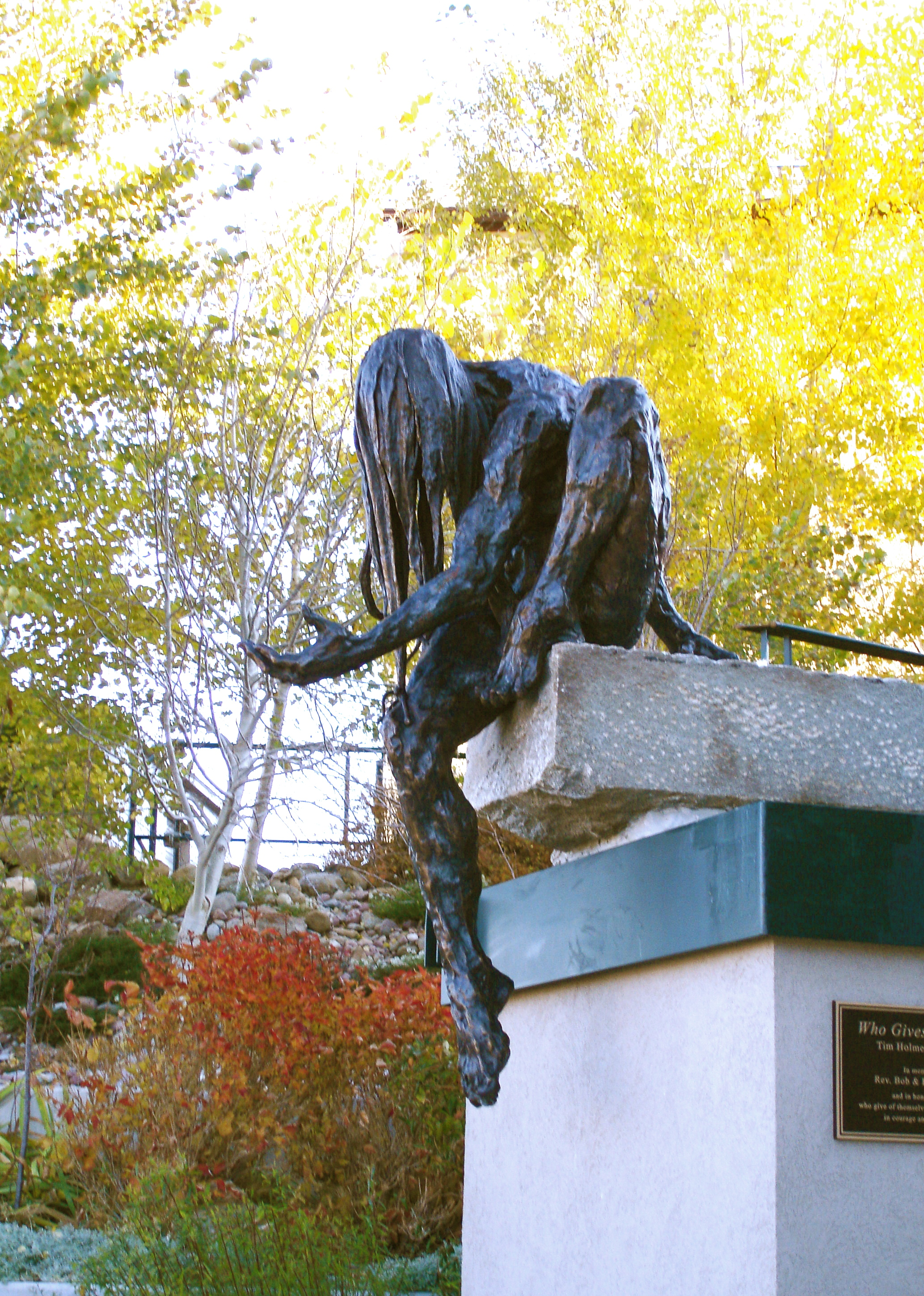
Who Gives All Gifts, bronze. St. Paul's United Methodist Church, Helena, Montana

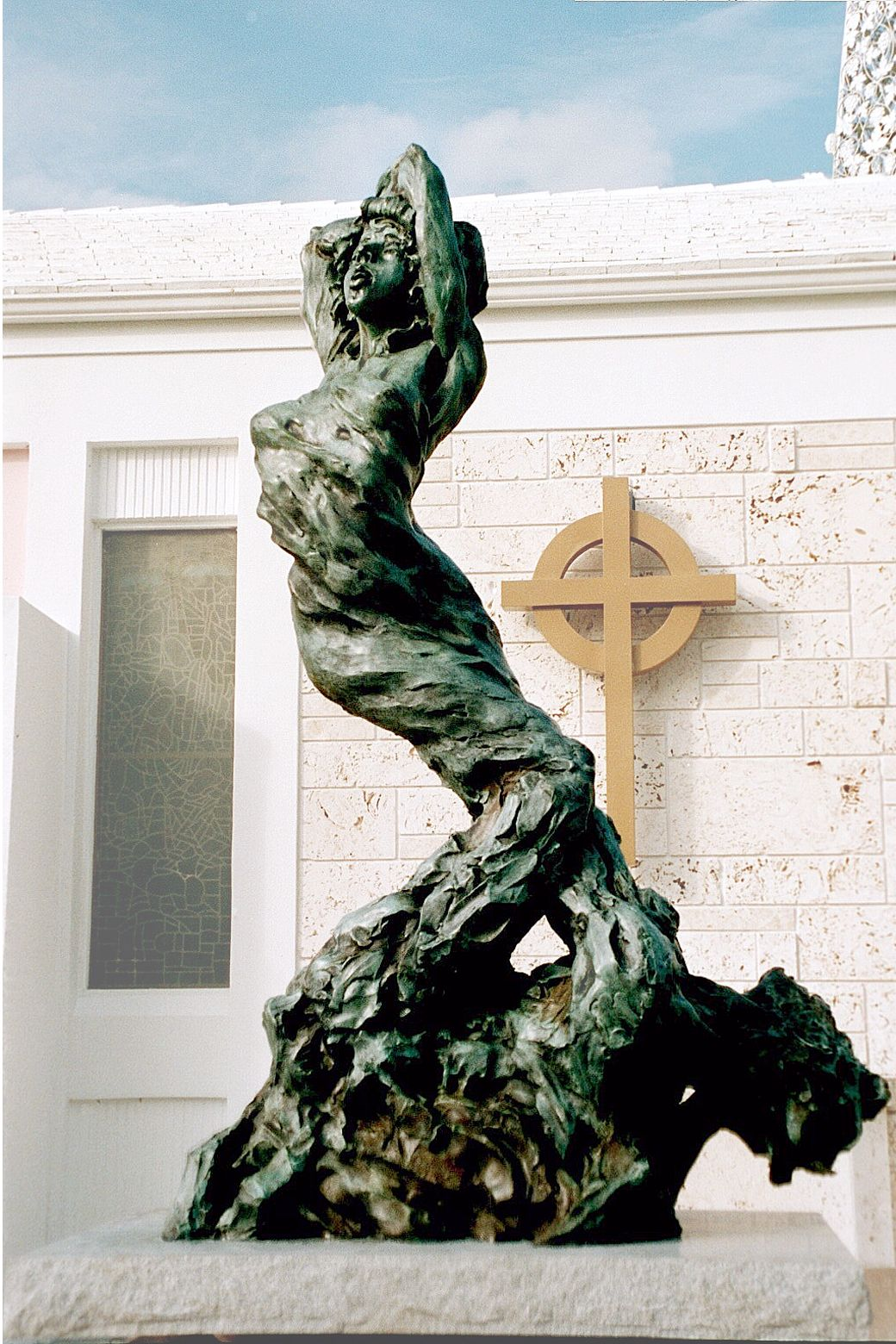
Cycle of Renewal, bronze. First Presbyterian Church, Pompano Beach, Florida

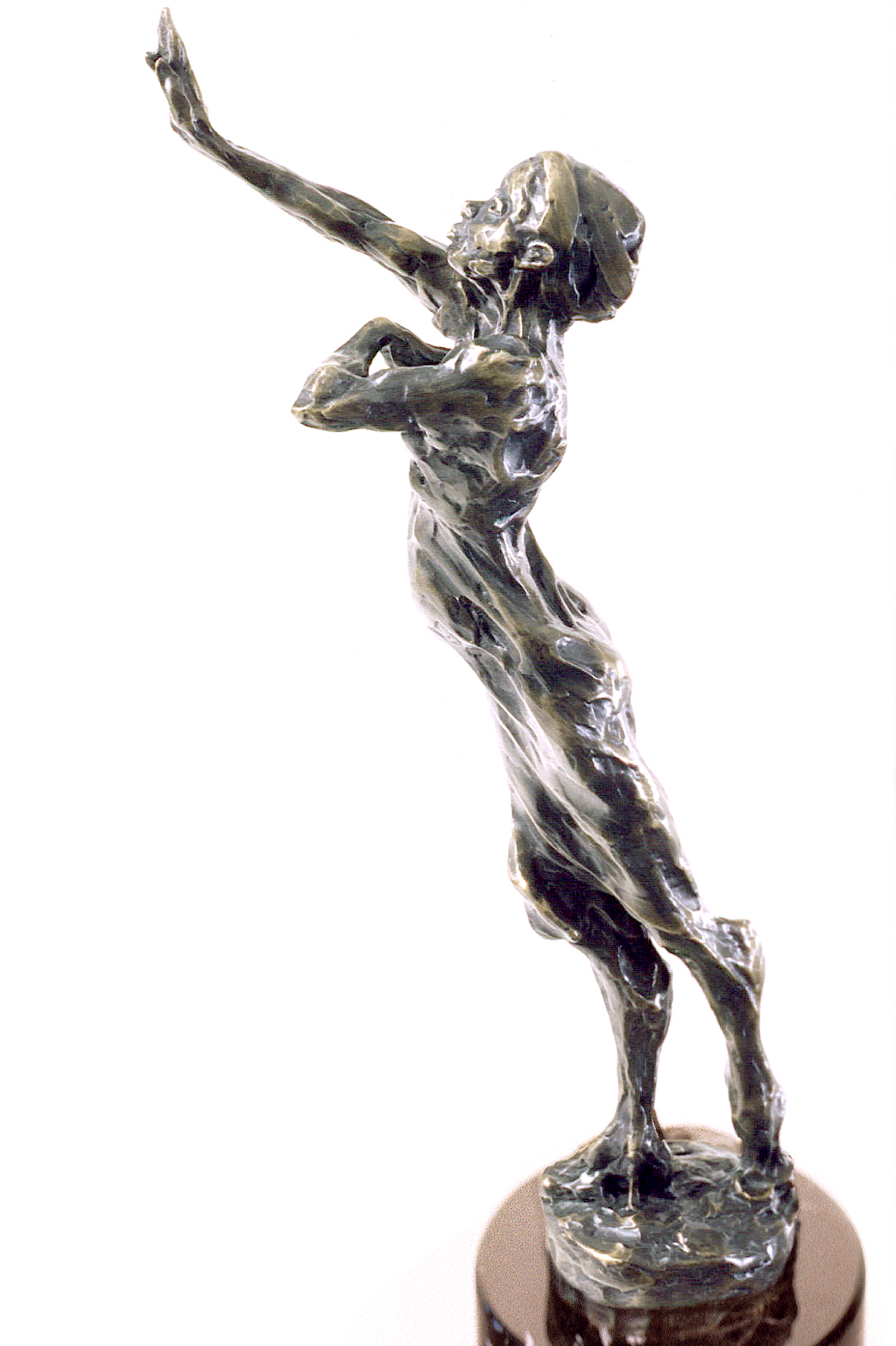
Anima Mundi, statue for the Millennium Peace Prize for Women
