= François Houtart =

Belgian Marxist sociologist and Catholic priest

François Houtart (7 March 1925 in Brussels – 6 June 2017 in Quito) was a Belgian Marxist sociologist and Catholic priest.

== Education ==
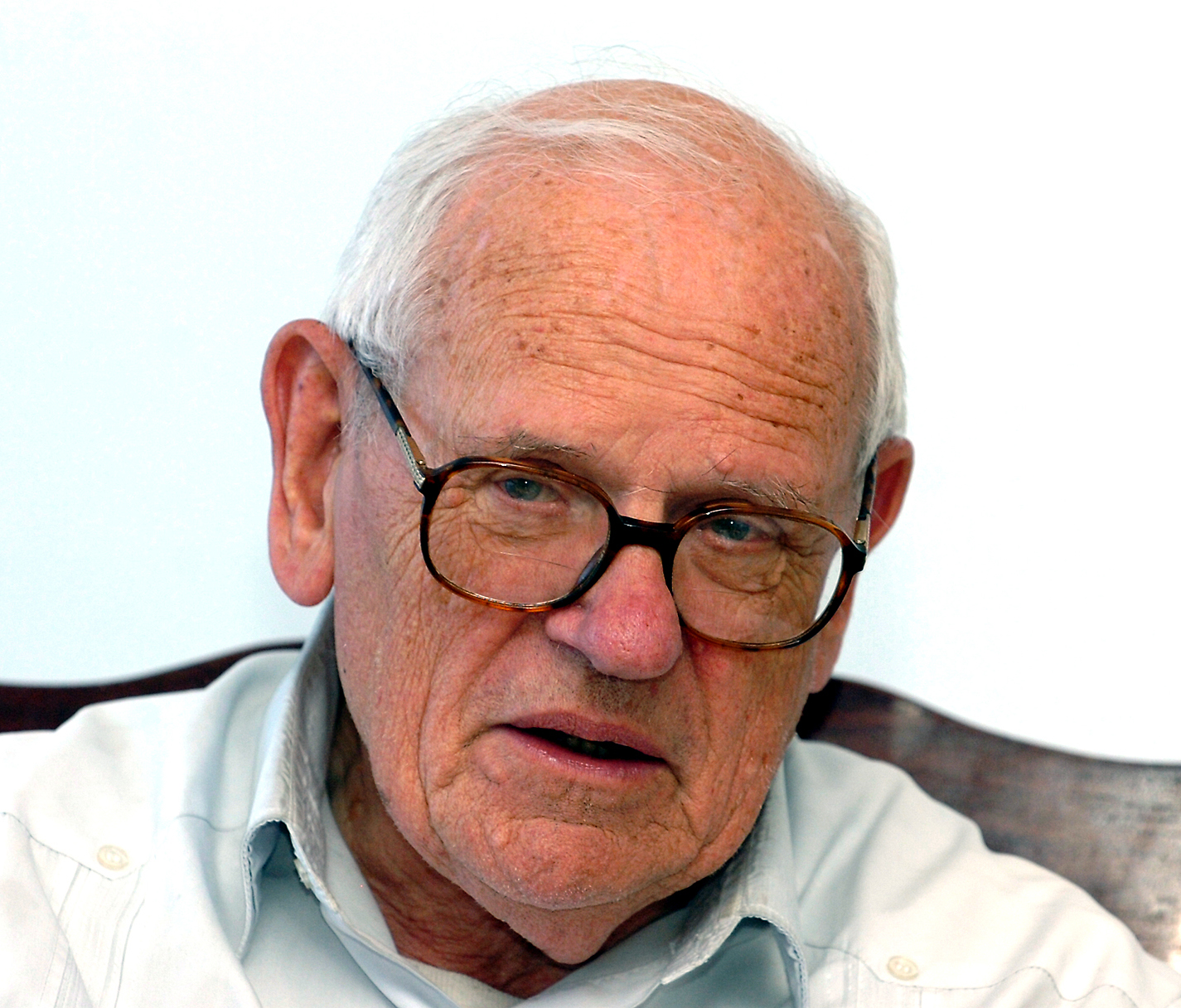
François Houtart June 2007

Houtart studied philosophy and theology at the seminary of Mechelen (Belgium) and became a priest in 1949. He earned a master's degree in political and social sciences at the Catholic University of Leuven (Belgium). He earned a degree at the International Superior Institute of Urbanism (Brussels, Belgium). He earned a PhD in sociology from the Catholic University of Louvain and served as professor there from 1958 till 1990.

His doctoral thesis was based on the sociology of Buddhism in Sri Lanka.

== Author and activist ==
Houtart was an author and co-author of numerous publications on socio-religious matters. He served as the chief editor of the International Journal of Sociology of Religion, "Social Compass" for nearly forty years (1960–1999). He also advised the international Catholic journal Concilium which was founded at the Nijmegen University, on the issues of sociology of religion.

He participated as a peritus expert in the sessions of Vatican II (1962–1965) playing a key role in the formation of the introduction of the Gaudium et spes. Over the years, Houtart developed a dialectical approach to the study of world religions.

During the 2008 financial crisis, in October 2008, Houtart was invited by the UN to address the issues of globalisation of capital by the president of the UN in New York.

In 2009, Houtart was awarded the UNESCO-Madanjeet Singh Prize for the Promotion of Tolerance and Non-Violence "for his lifelong commitment to world peace, intercultural dialogue, human rights and the promotion of tolerance, and in recognition of his outstanding efforts to advance the cause of social justice in the world." He shared the award with Pakistani philanthropist Abdul Sattar Edhi.

In 2009, Houtart signed the Appeal for the removal of Hamas from the EU terror list and he was instrumental in the Russell Tribunals against the state of Israel.

== CETRI and sexual abuse ==
In 2010, allegations were made that Houtart had sexually abused a minor. At the time, Houtart served as an advisor to CETRI (Centre Tricontinental), a Belgian non-governmental organisation which he founded in 1976. CETRI describes its aim as being the promotion of dialogue and cooperation between third world social movements and social forces, and to encourage resistance and action. Houtart was one of the most active members of the World Social Forum, and was active in the Globalisation and Ethics discourse.

In October 2010, the CETRI leadership requested Houtart's resignation. The Director, Bernard Duterme, stated that Houtart's actions were in contradiction with the values of CETRI.

In November, after a confrontation with his accusing niece, he contacted the support committee set up to present him for the Nobel Peace Prize and requested that its action be terminated.

== Organisational Activities ==
- Center Tricontinental (CETRI)
- International Association of Sociology of Religion
- World Forum for Alternatives

== Publications ==
- The Church and Revolution: from the French Revolution of 1789 to the Paris riots of 1968, from Cuba to Southern Africa, from Vietnam to Latin America, by François Houtart and André Rousseau. Translated by Violet Nevile (1971)
- Religions and ideology in Sri Lanka, Colombo, Hansa, (1974)
- El campesino como actor, Managua, Ed. Nicarao, (1982)
- Religion et modes de production précapitalistes, Bruxelles, editions de l'ULB, (1992)
- Sociología de la Religión, Mexico, Plaza y Valdés, (2000)
- Mondialisation des Résistances (with Samir Amin), Paris, L'Harmattan, (2002)
- Haïti et la culture dans une commune vietnamienne, Paris, Les Indes Savantes, (2004)
