= Montana Logging and Ballet Co. =

Former American comedy and political satire group

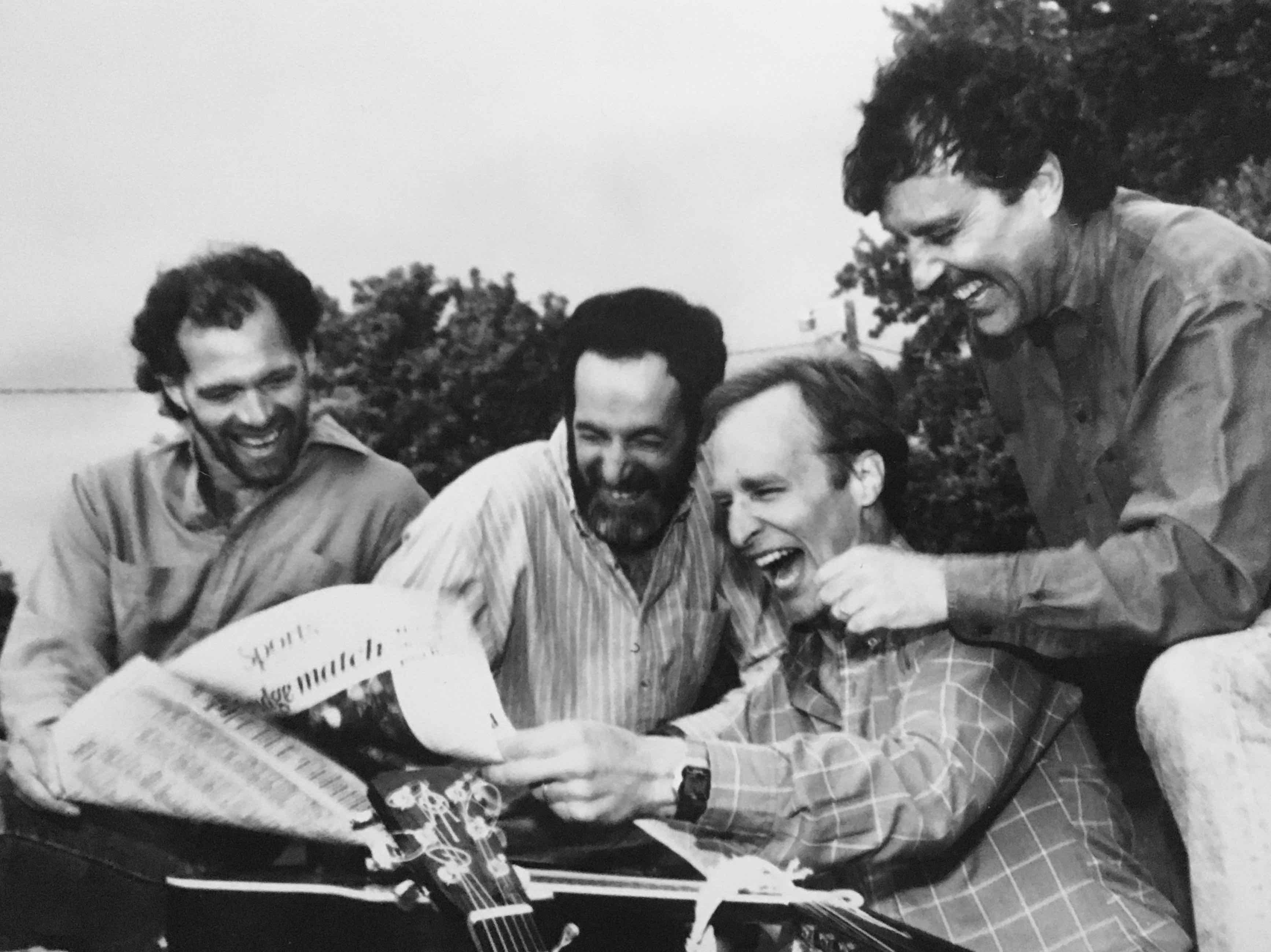
Montana Logging and Ballet Co. prepares for a concert with the local paper.

The Montana Logging and Ballet Company (MLBC) is an American music and political satire quartet, having performed around the U.S. from 1975 until their official retirement from touring in 2013.[1] They continued to perform occasionally in public until 2023, when they last performed in public with an original song at the Montana state capital building in Helena.[1] The group's four members, Tim Holmes, Rev. Steve Garnaas-Holmes, Rusty Harper and Bob FitzGerald,[1] got their start at Rocky Mountain College in Billings, MT, where they began performing a recruiting show for the college. All are life-long friends and Holmes and Garnaas-Holmes are brothers.[2]

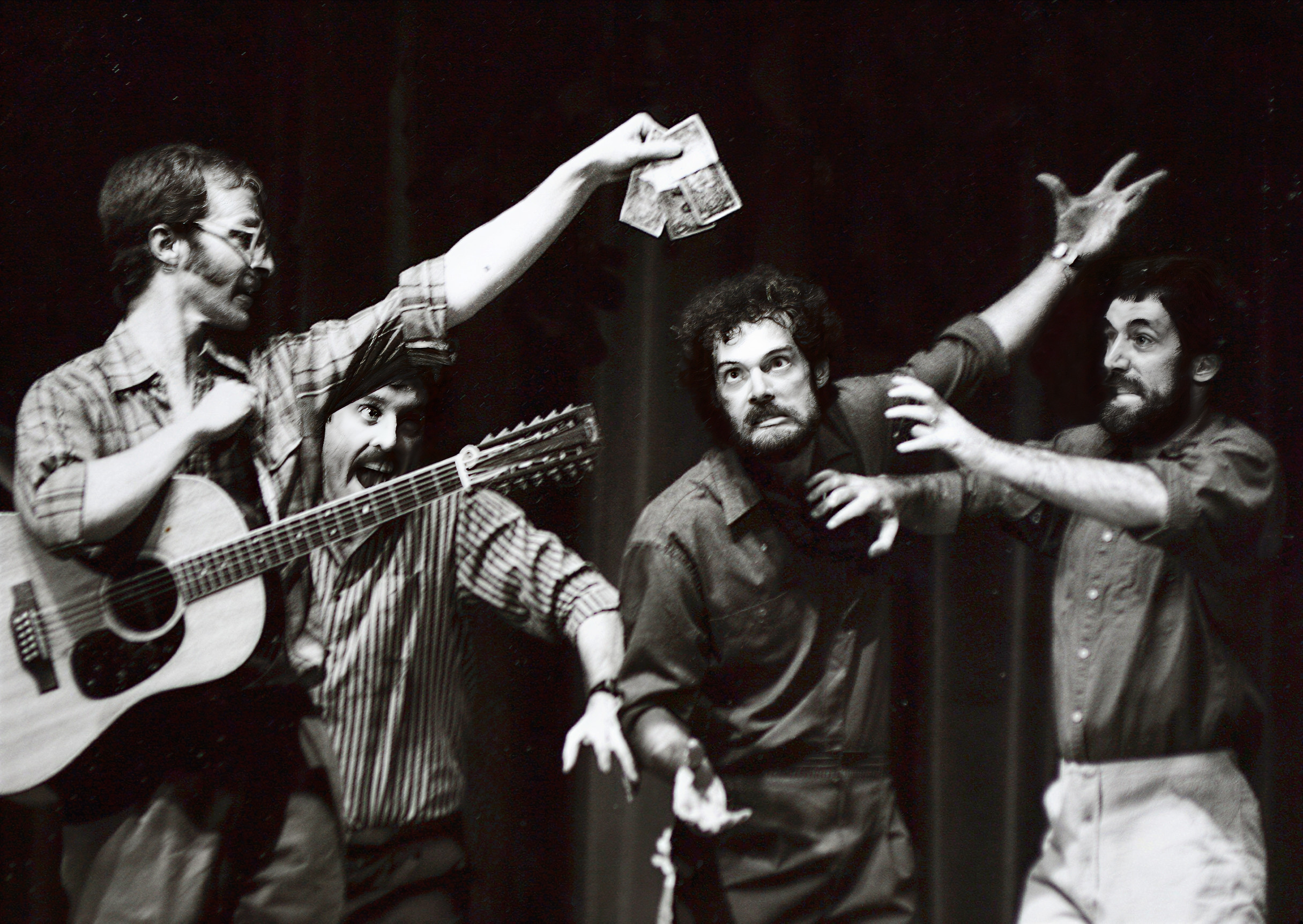
MLBC performs a slow-motion fight onstage, "How to Budget".

The quartet has performed for over 1.000 audiences from the U.S. Congress to the National Education Association to National Public Radio to the Whitehall MT Public Library[2]. Although all the members had other full-time jobs, they performed live public concerts 20-30 times a year, (usually not Saturdays, so Rev. Garnaas-Holmes could return to his church to conduct services on Sunday). They performed in every state of the union save Maine and Hawaii, mostly as benefits for progressive nonprofits.[3]

The group worked together as a team, each member providing their own unique skill set, Holmes as bassist and body comedian, Garnaas-Holmes as keyboardist and sound effects man, Harper as 12-string guitarist and inspirer, and FitGerald as banjo player and booking manager. They all wrote, composed and sang, providing a distinctive acapella blend[4].[5] Besides equal roles on stage, they wrote their satire as a group. Most of the music was written by Garnaas-Holmes, who, as a United Methodist pastor, also has written hymns for the United Methodist hymnal. In 1987 Holmes, a sculptor, was commissioned to provide and present his bronze sculpture, I Shot an Angel by Mistake, to Archbishop Desmond Tutu at a United Methodist Global Gathering in Louisville, KY.[2] The group also performed a concert for the same event, for which they wrote a song, Take the Barriers Down,[6] about overcoming the oppressive apartheid system in South Africa. There they met Archbishop Tutu, with whom they formed a close relationship and which resulted in a number of subsequent joint projects[7].[8][9]

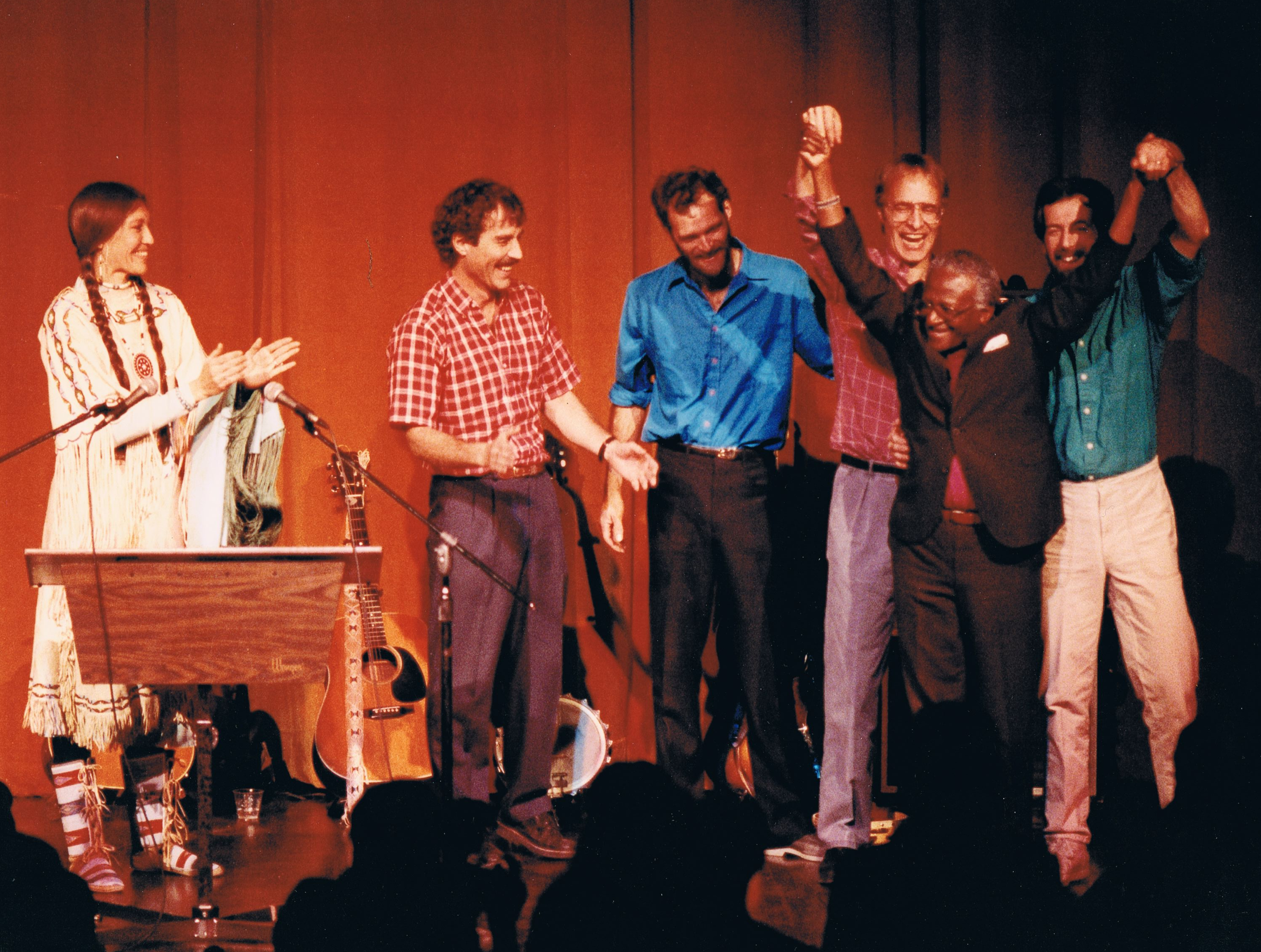
A Montana Logging and Ballet Co. concert fundraiser with Archbishop Tutu and Janine Pease.

In December 1990, the Archbishop flew to Helena, MT to join the group for double concerts, called "An Outburst of Hope", that raised almost $1,000,000 for Tutu's work in South Africa, mostly in scholarships. When a New York Times reporter asked him why he'd come from Cape Town to Helena of all places, he replied, "Of all places, it is the one with the Montana Logging and Ballet Company!"[10][11] Other joint projects include a benefit concert in Washington D.C. in 1988 and benefits using Holmes' sculptures for the Cape Town 2004 Olympics bid and a memorial at the Church of the Good Shepherd[12] on Cape Town's Robben Is., the site of the prison where South African president Nelson Mandela was incarcerated for 27 years.

In the following legislative session Montana passed the law honoring Martin Luther King Jr. Day, an issue the MLBC had been pushing for some time.[11]

The MLBC reached millions nationally through many short radio sketches, particularly with National Public Radio's Weekend Edition,[3] They've recorded several music and satire albums. Their first album, Take the Barriers Down,[13] 1987, was recorded in Los Angeles with members of the LA Philharmonic and features liner notes by Archbishop Desmond Tutu.[4] Funds from the sale of these albums helped Tutu's transformative work for peaceful political change in South Africa prior to the first free democratic elections in 1994, the focus of the title song.[4][10] Like their first album, the second album, We Don't Get It ,1992, was arranged and produced by jazz guitarist Mundell Lowe and featured jazz musicians including guitarist Tommy Tedesco.

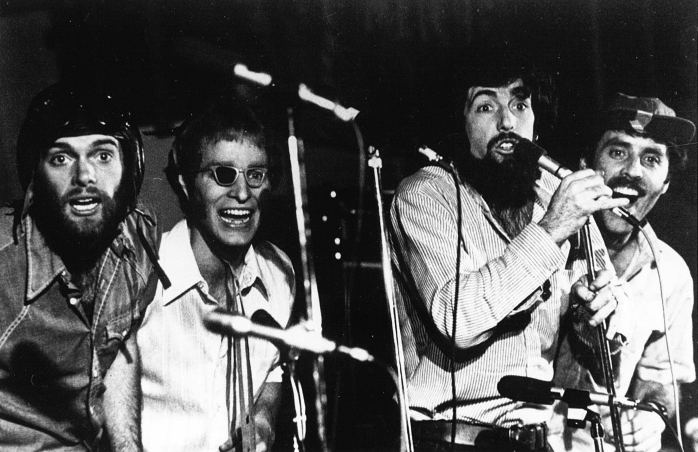
The Montana Logging and Ballet Co. performs "The Race" skit.

They then released two comedy albums, Solutions to Our Nation's Problems, Take 1, 1999, and Solutions to Our Nation's Problems, Take 2,[14] 2001, featuring selections from their regular appearances on NPR, where they were billed as NPR's "resident political satirists" during President Clinton's years.[5][6] For the show they provided music and short political satire sketches on the political issues of the day.[7][8]

After years of performing together the quartet stopped touring publicly after a final concert tour of their home state of Montana, preserved in a documentary film, Love is the Journey: The Montana Logging and Ballet Co.[15][5], which has aired as a fundraiser for Montana PBS for many years since 2012.[1]

Their respectful humor was always meant to "nudge" people a bit beyond their comfort level, to try and work together to make the world a better, more healthy place, hard-hitting but always in the end hopeful.[5] They pride themselves on the fact they stayed together for more than 50 years, and still sang for the occasional private event or public rally as of 2026.
