= United Nations Year for Tolerance =

The United Nations General Assembly proclaimed 1995 the United Nations Year for Tolerance with UNESCO as the lead organization. (It had invited the Economic and Social Council to consider the matter in an earlier session.)

The idea and practice of tolerance was widely promoted in schools in many member states. Tolerance was held to be an 'endangered virtue' in many parts of the world, particularly those who were under racial and religious wars, such as those in Bosnia and Rwanda. UNESCO said that five key planks were required to overcome intolerance: law, education, access to information, individual awareness and local solutions. Tolerance is thus a political, legal and moral duty to protect and preserve human rights.

The International Day for Tolerance is now celebrated on November 16 every year, in recognition of the Paris Declaration which was signed that day in 1995 by 185 member states.

In 1995, a press conference was held at the United Nations by 12-year-old Mark Semotiuk who launched his book 401 Goofy Jokes for Kids which united kids from Ukraine, Canada and the United States, as one of the symbols for the United Nations Year for Tolerance.

== See also ==
- International Day for Tolerance
- UNESCO-Madanjeet Singh Prize for the promotion of tolerance and non-violence, established in 1996.
