= International Day for Tolerance =

Annual observance declared by UNESCO

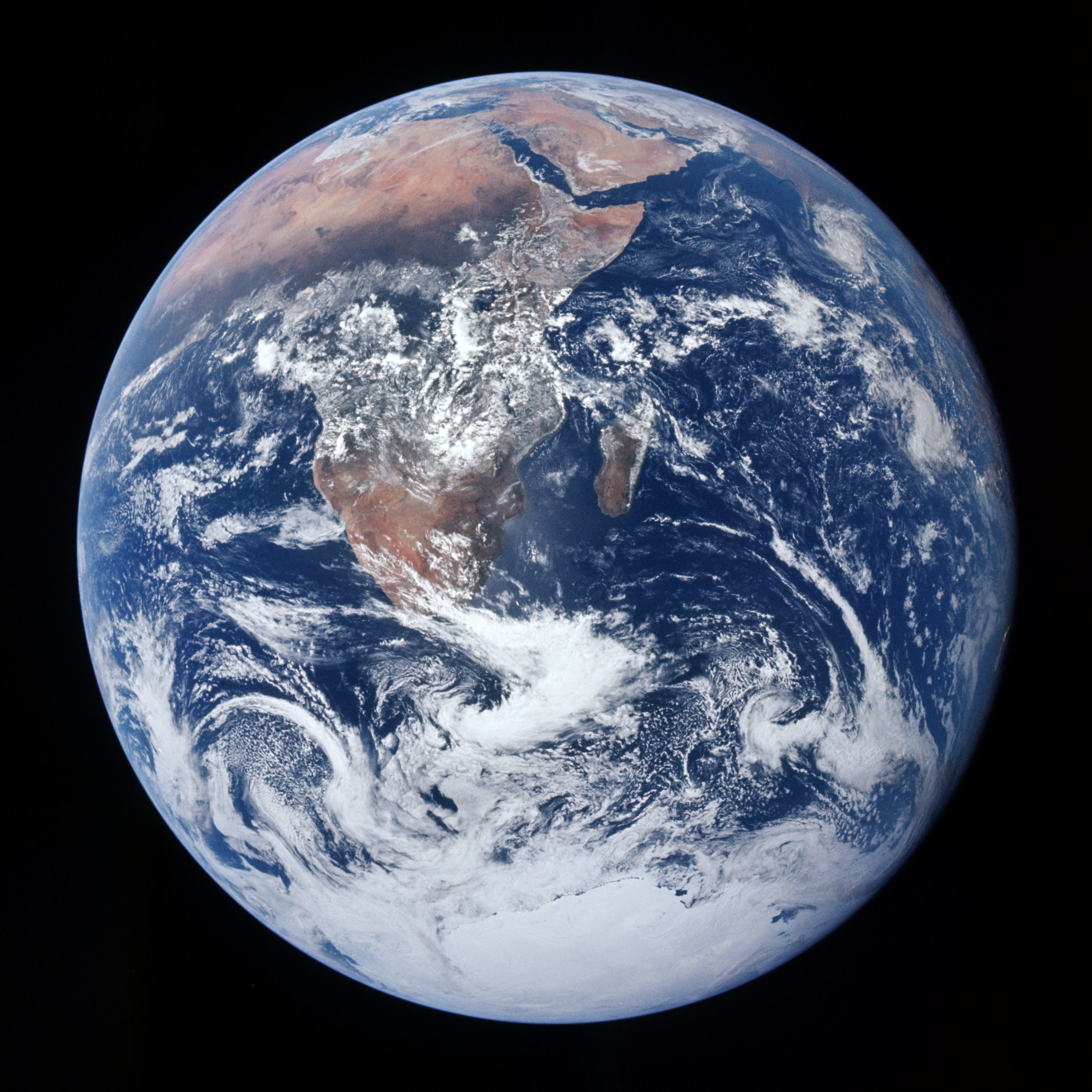
- Also called: IDT
- Observed by: UN Members
- Begins: 1995
- Date: 16 November
- Next time: 16 November 2026
- Frequency: annual

The International Day for Tolerance is an annual observance day declared by UNESCO in 1995 to generate public awareness of the dangers of intolerance. It is observed on 16 November.

== Conferences and festivals ==
Every year various conferences and festivals are organized in the occasion of International Day for Tolerance. Among them, "Universal Tolerance Cartoon Festival" in Drammen, Norway which organized an International Cartoon Festival in 2013.

The day is observed in Bangladesh with Peace Summit. Peace Summit is organized by Preneur Lab and the EMK Center. The conference is a platform to talk and share on country's challenges on issues like peace, tolerance, fake news, online safety and hate.

== See also ==
- Human rights education
- Toleration
- UNESCO-Madanjeet Singh Prize for the promotion of tolerance and non-violence. The winner of this bi-annual award established in 1996 is announced on the International Day for Tolerance.
- United Nations Year for Tolerance
- List of international days
- UNESCO statements on race
- World Conference against Racism
