= Political satire =

Political commentary in a style of humor based on parody

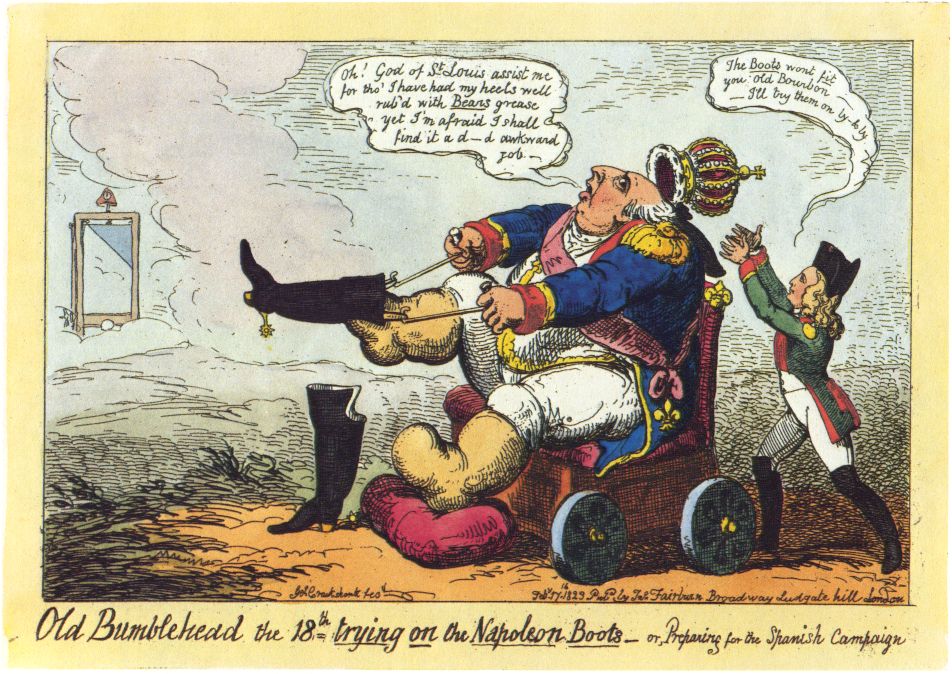
George Cruikshank (1792–1878) was one of the first to pioneer the genre of political cartoons. In this 1823 depiction, the French monarch Louis XVIII fails to fit into Napoleon's boots as his crown falls from his head.

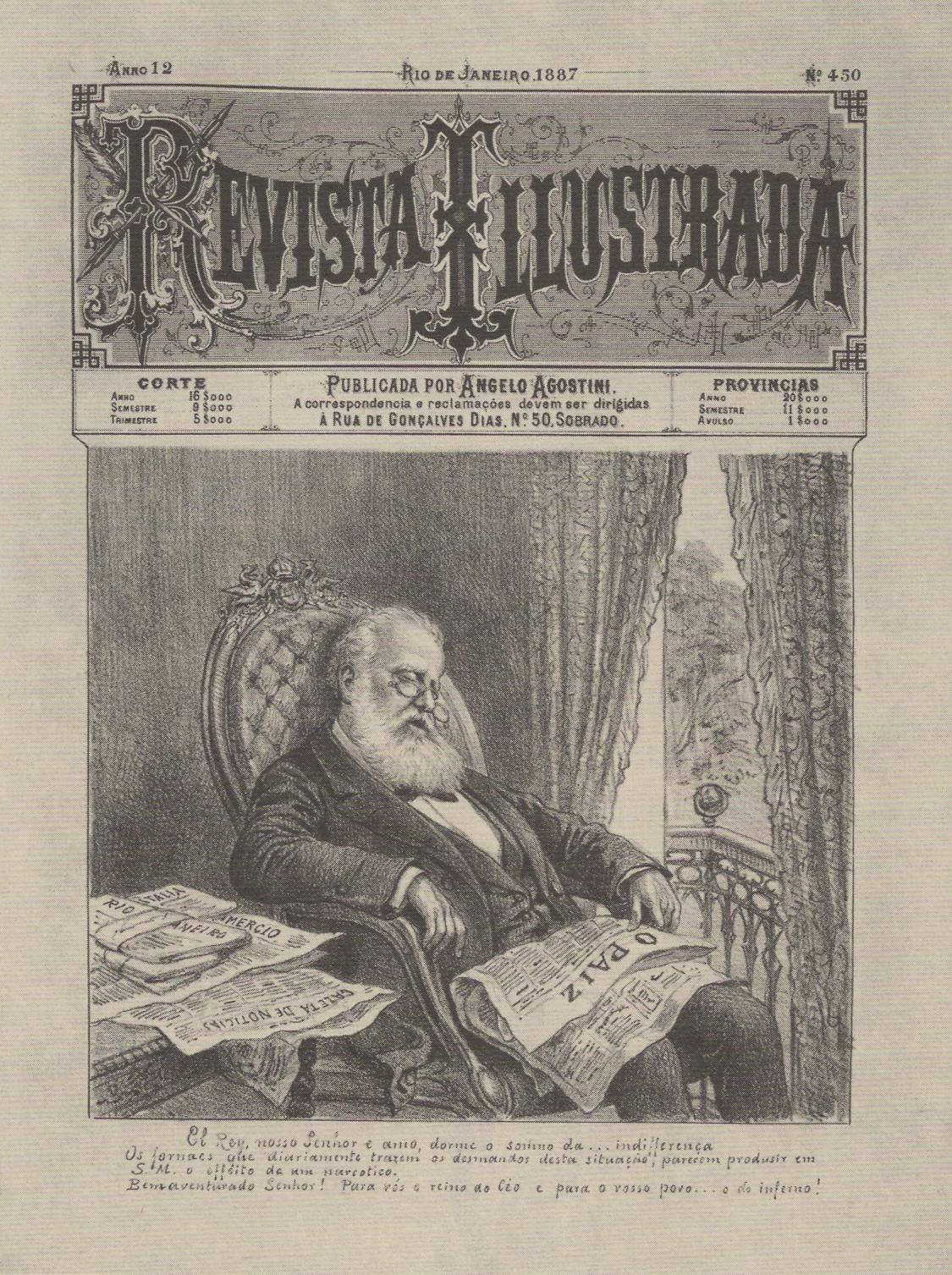
A satire by Angelo Agostini to Revista Illustrada mocking the lack of interest from Emperor Pedro II of Brazil in politics toward the end of his reign (1887).

Political satire is a type of satire that specializes in gaining entertainment from politics. Political satire can also act as a tool for advancing political arguments in conditions where political speech and dissent are banned.

Example of contemporary Australian political satire presented as a parody advertisement.

Political satire is usually distinguished from political protest or political dissent, as it does not necessarily carry an agenda nor seek to influence the political process. While occasionally it may, it more commonly aims simply to provide entertainment. By its very nature, it rarely offers a constructive view in itself; when it is used as part of protest or dissent, it tends to simply establish the error of matters rather than provide solutions. Because of the exaggerated manner of these parodies, satirical news shows can more effectively sway their audiences to believe specific ideas by overemphasizing the flaws of the critiqued subject. This can be very harmful to the reputation of public figures or organizations since the satire frames them in a comical way.

== Origins and genres ==
Satire can be traced back throughout history; wherever organized government, or social categories have existed, so has satire.

The oldest example that has survived until today is Aristophanes. In his time, satire targeted top politicians, like Cleon, and religion, at the time headed by Zeus. "Satire and derision progressively attacked even the fundamental and most sacred facts of faith," leading to an increased doubt towards religion by the general population. The Roman period, for example, gives us the satirical poems and epigrams of Martial. Cynic philosophers often engaged in political satire.

Due to the lack of political freedom of speech in many ancient civilizations, covert satire is more common than overt satire in ancient literature of political liberalism. Historically, public opinion in the Athenian democracy was remarkably influenced by the political satire performed by the comic poets at the theatres. Watching or reading satire has since ancient times been considered one of the best ways to understand a culture and a society.

During the 20th and 21st centuries, satire was found in an increasing number of media (in cartoons such as political cartoons with heavy caricature and exaggeration and political magazines) and the parallel exposure of political scandals to performances (including television shows). Examples include musicians such as Tom Lehrer incorporating lyrics which targeted the army and the church, live performance groups like the Capitol Steps and the Montana Logging and Ballet Co., and public television and live performer Mark Russell who made satirist comments to both democrats and republicans alike. Additional subgenres include such literary classics as Gulliver's Travels and Animal Farm, and more recently, the digital online magazine and website sources such as The Onion.

== 19th and 20th centuries ==
=== France ===
One example is Maurice Joly's 1864 pamphlet entitled The Dialogue in Hell Between Machiavelli and Montesquieu (Dialogue aux enfers entre Machiavel et Montesquieu), which attacks the political ambitions of Napoleon III. It was first published in Brussels in 1864. The piece used the literary device of a dialogue between two diabolical plotters in Hell, the historical characters of Machiavelli and Montesquieu, to cover up a direct, and illegal, attack on Napoleon's rule. The noble baron Montesquieu made the case for liberalism; the Florentine political writer Machiavelli presented the case for cynical despotism. In this manner, Joly communicated the secret ways in which liberalism might spawn a despot like Napoleon III.

The literacy rate in France was roughly 30 percent in the 19th century making it virtually impossible for people of lower classes to engage in political satire. However, visual arts could be interpreted by anyone, and a man named Charles Philipon took advantage creating two weekly magazines, La Caricature and Le Charivari – the cheaper of the two. Philipon used his papers, which had become more and more popular across France, as a threat to the King, Louis-Philippe, as the papers used satire and humor to criticize the government and King. Several attempts to suppress the two magazines were made by the monarchy which would only make the articles more critical. Philipon was eventually taken to court and sentenced to 13 months in prison following several more arrests.

The drawings that originally sent Philipon to court were drawings that turned the King into a pear over the course of the drawings. The people of France began to recognize that King Louis-Philippe really did look like a pear and could not separate the two. People began to sarcastically state that pears should be banned in the country as cutting one would be a threat towards the King, Louis-Philippe.

=== Germany ===
According to Santayana, German philosopher Friedrich Nietzsche was actually "a keen satirist". "Nietzsche's satire" was aimed at Lutheranism.

Kladderadatsch and Simplicissimus were two sources of political satire in Germany during the 18–19 century, both of which show how satire can be used to see cultural history in societies. Popularity in press and satirical jokes flourished in the 19th century as thousands of new magazines emerged in Germany. Magazines and newspapers began to exceed the consumption of books and became one of the most popular forms of media in Germany at the time.

=== United Kingdom ===
The UK has a long tradition of political satire, dating from the early years of English literature. In some readings, a number of William Shakespeare's plays can be seen – or at least performed – as satire, including Richard III and The Merchant of Venice. Later examples such as Jonathan Swift's A Modest Proposal are more outright in their satirical nature.

Through the 18th and 19th centuries editorial cartoons developed as graphic form of satire, with dedicated satirical magazines such as Punch (launched 1841) appearing in the first half of the 19th century. A local satirical newspaper, The Town Crier, launched in Birmingham in 1861, has been described as setting out, through humor, to compare "municipal government as it was – in incompetent hands – with municipal government as it might be".

The early 1960s saw the so-called "satire boom", of which the most prominent products were the stage revue Beyond the Fringe (debuted 1960), the fortnightly magazine Private Eye (launched 1961) and the BBC TV show That Was the Week That Was (1962–1963). More recent examples have included topical television panel shows such as Have I Got News for You and Mock the Week, and television series such as Ballot Monkeys, The Mash Report and Spitting Image.

Key political cartoonists in the United Kingdom include people such as Peter Brookes who has been a political cartoonist for The Times since 1992 and Nicola Jennings who features regularly in The Guardian.

==== Street art ====
Street artists like Banksy have used dark political humor and witty political and social commentaries, primarily through graffiti, to comment on various themes such as capitalism, imperialism and war. Banksy's pieces which feature street art on political satire include "Stop and Search" which illustrates the character Dorothy from The Wizard of Oz being searched by a police officer. Banksy mocks politicians opinions on police brutality as innocent Dorothy is being questioned by the police which is a representation of police brutality. "Bomb Hugger" is another one of Banksy's pieces which displays a young woman hugging a bomb which was dropped by military planes. He criticizes the nature of war and the opinions of politicians on the subject as the woman represents innocence being directly impacted by the "dark" bomb symbol.

=== United States ===
Political satire has played a role in American Politics since the 1700s. Under King George's rule, the colonies used political cartoons to criticize the parliament and fight for independence. Founding father Benjamin Franklin was a notable political satirist. He employed satire in several essays, including Rules by Which a Great Empire May Be Reduced to a Small One and A Witch Trial at Mount Holly.

Cartoons continued to provide commentary on American politics. In the late 1800s, editorial cartoonist Thomas Nast employed political satire to tackle issues like corruption. Amongst other notable political satirists is well-known author Mark Twain, who used satire to criticize and comment on slavery.

In the 1930's, political satire dominated Broadway. Lyricist Irving Berlin and playwright Moss Hart co-wrote the popular musical As Thousands Cheer. The Broadway show poked fun at politics by referencing topical news articles.

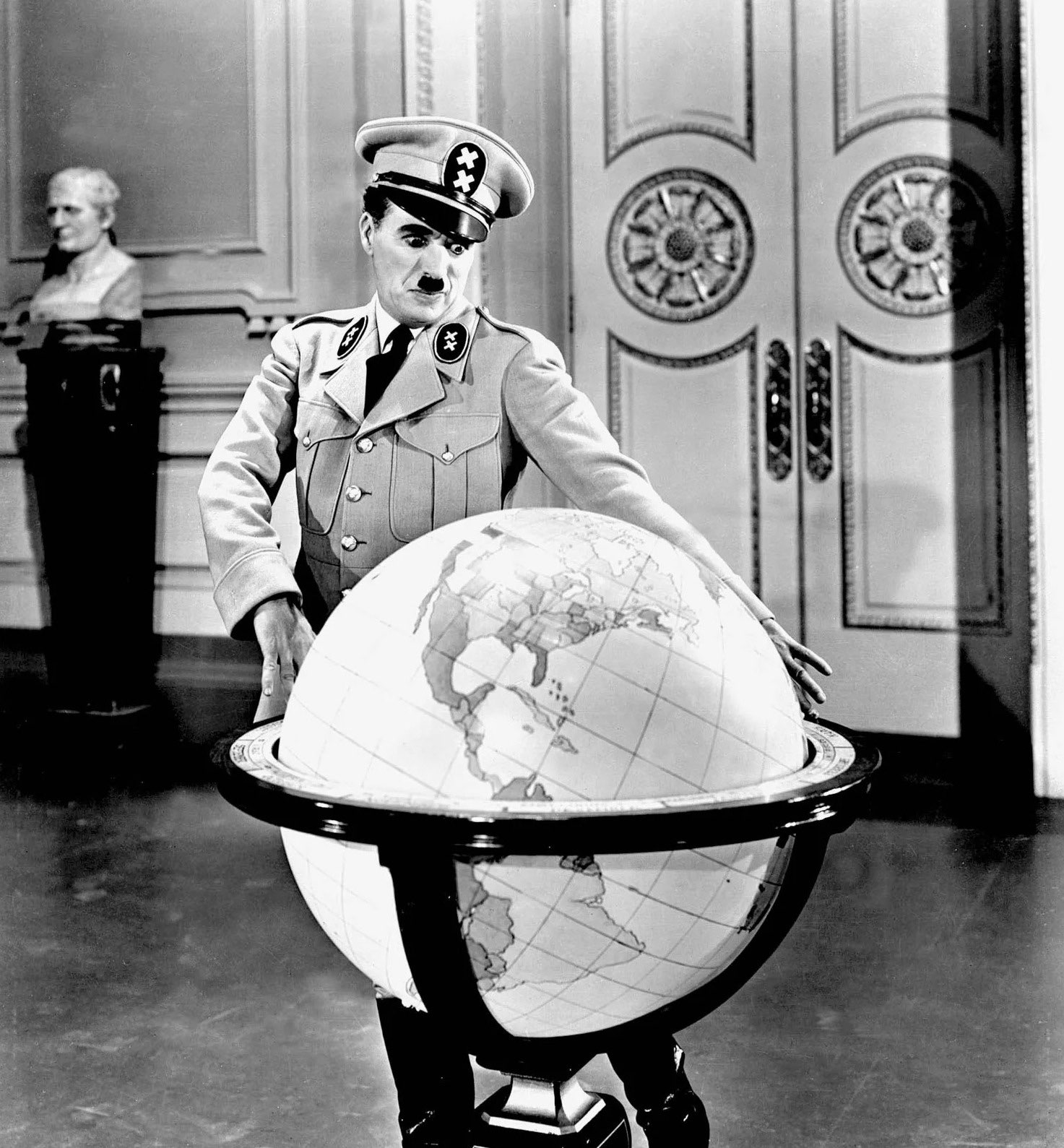
The Great Dictator (1940), one of the most famous examples of political satire in film, criticized the regime of Adolf Hitler.

Satire became more visible on American television during the 1960s. Some of the early shows that used political satire include the British and American versions of the program That Was the Week That Was (airing on the American Broadcasting Company, or ABC, in the U.S.), CBS's The Smothers Brothers Comedy Hour, and NBC's Rowan and Martin's Laugh-In. During the months leading up to the 1968 presidential election, Richard Nixon appeared on Laugh-In and repeated the program's catch-phrase "Sock it to me." Other forms of satire of the 1960s and early 1970s typically used the sitcom format, such as the show All in the Family.

When Saturday Night Live debuted in 1975, the show began to change the way that comedians would depict the president on television. Chevy Chase opened the fourth episode of the show with his impersonation of a bumbling Gerald Ford.

== 21st century ==
=== The Middle East ===
Turkey is home to the political satire magazine known as LeMan, which published its 1000th issue in 2010. LeMan is known for its political cartoons highlighting corruption, lampooning and shedding light on serious situations using humor.

One of the most-widely read satirists is Egyptian writer Lenin El-Ramly, who is credited with over 30 scripts for films and television series and 12 plays. Another notable Egyptian satirist is Bassem Youssef.

In Syria, in the year 2001 a satirical newspaper known as the Lamplighter was first published and resonated with the public as it sold out immediately. It was the first independent paper in the country since 1965 and was created by cartoonist and satirist Ali Farzat.

==== Censorship ====
A 2002 example of censorship resulted in satirist Ali Farzat having to remove two articles and a cartoon about the Prime Minister from a magazine, which was deemed insulting. Farzat's newspaper was subsequently shut down and his printing license was revoked.

=== United States ===
During the 2008 presidential campaign, Saturday Night Live gained wide attention because former cast member Tina Fey returned to the show to satirize Republican vice presidential candidate Sarah Palin. In addition to Fey's striking physical resemblance to Palin, the impersonation of the vice presidential candidate was also noteworthy because of Fey's humorous use of some of exactly the same words Palin used in media interviews and campaign speeches as a way to perform political satire.

Saturday Night Live also uses political satire throughout its Weekend Update sketch. Weekend Update is a fake news segment on the show that satirizes politics and current events. It has been a part of SNL since the first episode of the show on October 11, 1975.

The Daily Show and The Colbert Report use stylistic formats that are similar to Weekend Update. On The Daily Show, host Jon Stewart used footage from news programs to satirize politics and the news media. Stephen Colbert performed in character on The Colbert Report as a right-wing news pundit. Both hosts' television programs were broadcast on Comedy Central. The Daily Show continues to run with Stewart as the Monday host, and featured Trevor Noah as the host from 2015–2022; Colbert became the host of The Late Show, succeeding David Letterman. With their shows, Stewart and Colbert helped increase public and academic discussion of the significance of political satire. Real Time with Bill Maher, Full Frontal with Samantha Bee and Last Week Tonight with John Oliver are also examples of satirical news shows.

During the 2020 presidential campaign, perennial candidate Vermin Supreme was recruited by members of the Libertarian Party to run a serious presidential campaign (Vermin Supreme 2020 presidential campaign) which utilizes his satirical character to promote libertarianism.

== Influence in politics ==
=== Contributions ===
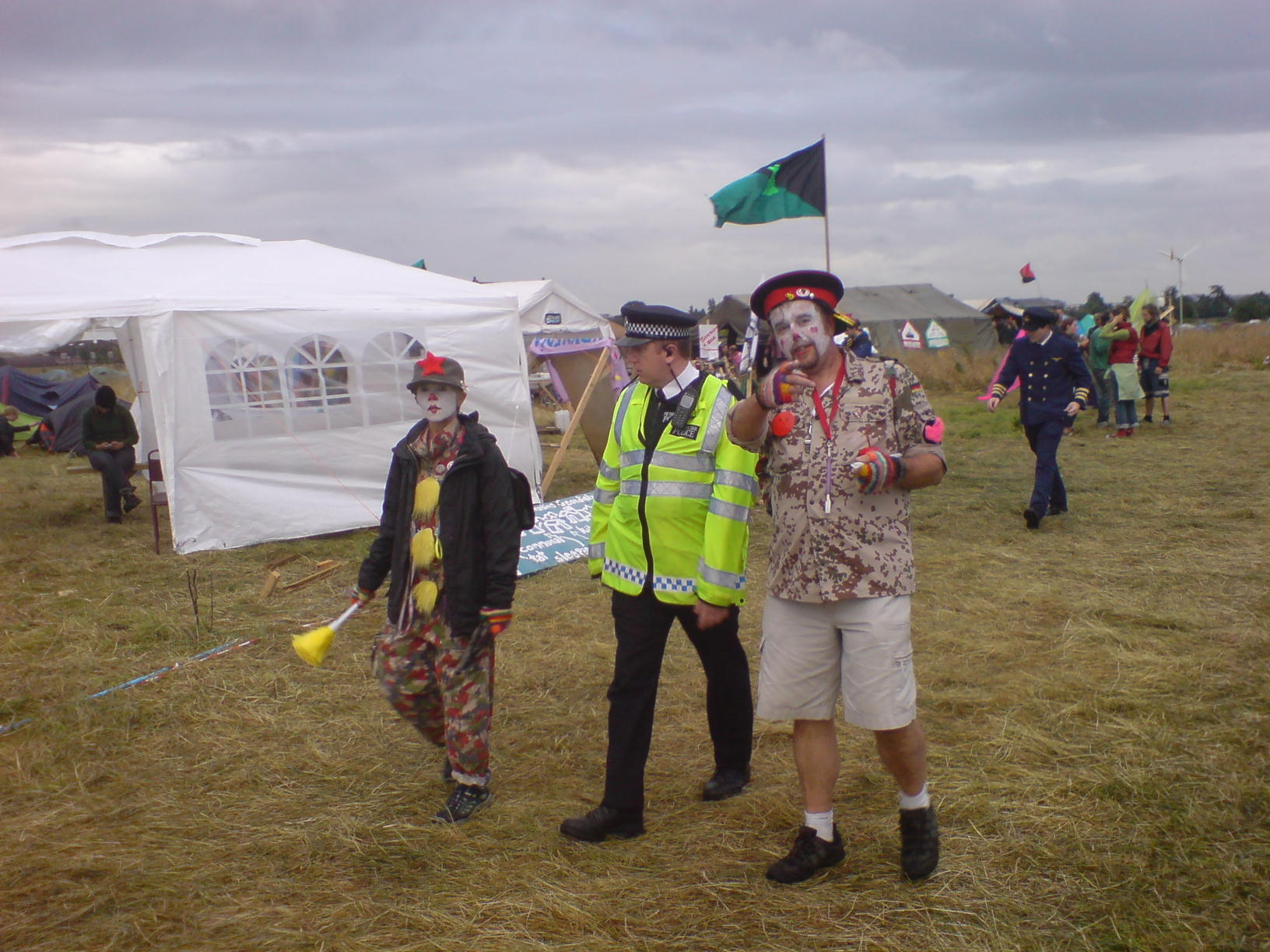
Anarchist political satire protest in the United Kingdom

According to the findings of the 2004 Pew Survey, both younger and older audiences are turning to late-night comedy shows as not only a source of entertainment, but also for an opportunity to gain political awareness. For this reason, Geoffrey Baym suggests that shows that make use of political satire, such as The Daily Show, should be considered as a form of alternative journalism. Utilizing satire has shown to be an attractive feature in news programming, drawing in the audiences of less politically engaged demographic cohorts. Moreover, satire news programming can be considered alternative because satire plays an important role in dissecting and critiquing power.

In his article The Daily Show: Discursive Integration and the Reinvention of Political Journalism, Baym detailed how The Daily Show, then hosted by Jon Stewart, presented news stories. For the satire news show, presenting information in a comprehensive manner was used to give viewers a greater perspective of a situation. Often, Stewart studded his segments with additional background information, or reminders of relevant and past details. For example, The Daily Show displayed the full video of Bush's comments regarding Tenet's resignation in 2004. This was a deliberate choice by the show in attempt to give a more sincere representation of the event. Moreover, it can be seen as a challenge and critique of what more traditional news shows failed to include. In this way, satire news can be seen as more informative than other news sources. Notably, research findings released by National Annenberg Election Survey (NAES) concede that followers of satire news are more knowledgeable and consume more news than the general population.

Meanwhile, Joseph Faina has considered the satire used in news shows as a facilitator in developing a public journalism practice. Faina explains in his article that the nature of satire encourages viewers to become politically engaged, and a civic participant, in which the humor exercised by hosts elicit responses in viewers. However, Faina has acknowledged that this model is somewhat idealistic. Nevertheless, Faina argues that the potential still exists. Not to mention, with the rise in technology and the growing ubiquity of cellular phones, it can be argued that civic participation is all the more easy to accomplish.

==== Effects on political participation ====
Modern studies of the effects of political satire have shown that political satire has an influence on political participation, in fact research has shown that an exposure to satire of a political nature evokes negative emotions which consequently mobilizes political participation. It is documented that watching late-night comedy shows increases political participation due to the interpersonal discussions and online interaction that follows as a result of political satire.

On the other hand, some scholars have expressed concern over the influence of political comedy shows, it is argued that rather than increase political participation it has the adverse effect. Rather than mobilize participation it can actually demobilize participation due to the negative analysis of political figures, leading to cynicism towards the government and electoral system. Research has shown that voter attitude shifts positively in relation to political figures who find humor in their ridicule. This has to do with the feeling of relating to politicians, who allow themselves to be seen as the comedians joke. Political satire may also be used to cover a presidential aspect that America has a problem with. Joe Biden utilized humor in his campaign for presidency as he joked about the concern of his age.

=== Concerns ===
Though satire in news is celebrated as a vehicle toward a more informed public, such view is not universally shared among scholars. Critics have expressed their hesitancy toward the infiltration of lighthearted practices to cover more dire topics like political affair. Potentially off-color remarks, or vulgar comments made by the likes of Stephen Colbert of The Late Show with Stephen Colbert, or Samantha Bee, host of Full Frontal with Samantha Bee, can be used as examples of what critics are concerned about. Here, satire is believed to diminish the gravity of a topic.

Baym proposes that as these shows are alternative, they have no obligation to "abide by standard practices". Unlike traditional news sources, which may be required to adhere to certain agendas, like political affiliation or advertising restrictions, hosts of satire news shows are free and zealous to showcase personal contributions through their mentions of disdain, qualms, and excitement. Critics of satire in news shows thus believe that the showcasing of an overly and openly frustrated host will induce or perpetuate "cynicism in viewers".

The Financial Times argues that political satire can contribute to "media led populism", this is argued to be due to the mockery of politicians and public officials that is required to be accountable only to "audience maximisation", it is argued that this form of media led populism is more prevalent in the United States than the United Kingdom, as commentators who are both Liberal and Conservative are being used more often as the "main way" in which young viewers learn about current affairs. This is particularly troublesome when commentators use polemic and sarcasm in their satire as opposed to witty humor or impersonations.

== See also ==
- Augustan literature
- Kabarett
- News satire
- List of frivolous political parties
- Post turtle
- Social commentary
