= Anarkali Kaur Honaryar =

Afghan politician and activist

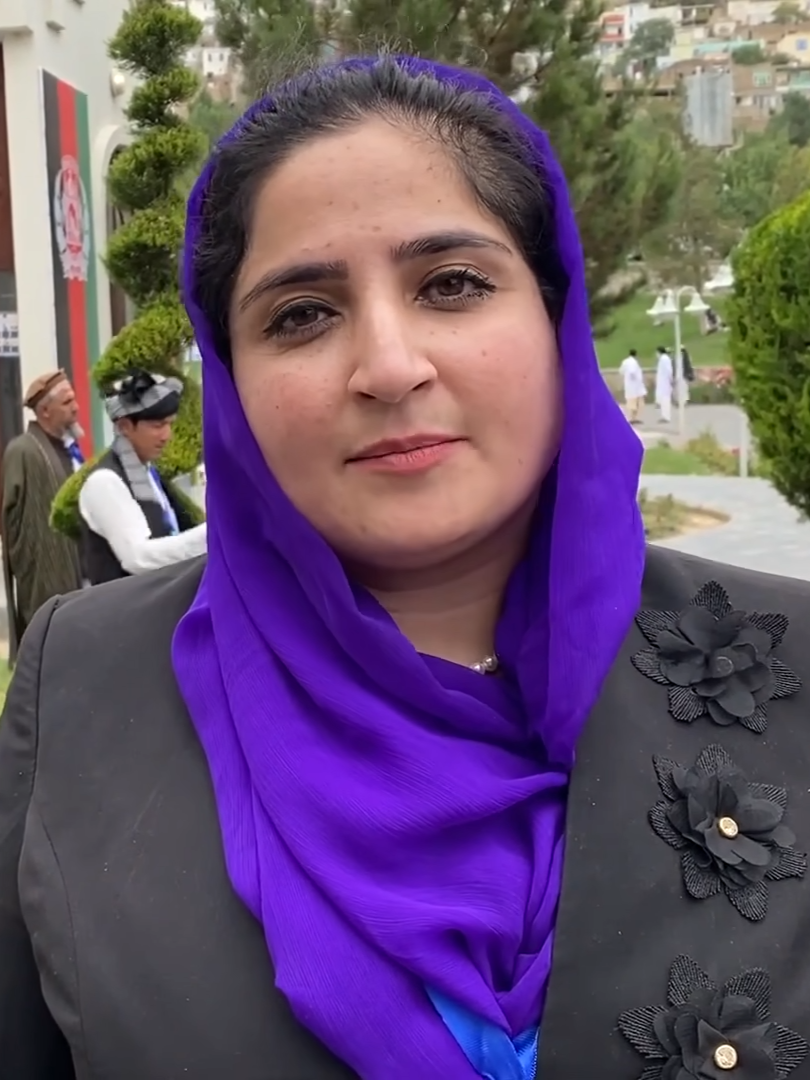
Anarkali Kaur Honaryar

Anarkali Kaur Honaryar (Dari: انارکلی هنریار) is a Sikh Afghan politician. She is also a women's rights activist and a dentist, as well as a medical doctor.

There were only about 30,000 Sikhs and Hindus in Afghanistan, Anarkali Kaur Honaryar is one of them. She is the first non-Muslim member of National Assembly of Afghanistan.

== Career ==
When the Taliban was ousted in 2001, Honaryar studied medicine at the Kabul University. She has been a member of the Loya Jirga which chose Afghanistan's interim government after the fall of the Taliban regime, and also an Afghan Constitution Committee member. In 2006, she became a member of Afghan Independent Human Rights Commission.

In 2010, Honaryar was elected to the country's Meshrano Jirga, and was the first non-Muslim woman to achieve the milestone, she left her post in mid-2015.

On 22 August 2021, she came to India along with the Indians rescued by Indian forces from Afghanistan amid the fall of Kabul to the Taliban in 2021.

== Awards and honors ==
Honaryar is a well-known human rights activist and has been awarded with the UNESCO-Madanjeet Singh Prize for the Promotion of Tolerance and Non-Violence "for her work helping women who suffer from domestic abuse, forced marriages and gender discrimination and for her commitment to promote the ideals of human dignity, human rights, mutual respect and tolerance in her country." Honaryar was also chosen by Radio Free Europe's Afghan chapter as person of the year in 2009.
