= Pro-Femmes Twese Hamwe =

Pro-Femmes Twese Hamwe is a national women's organization in Rwanda founded in 1992 that is recognized internationally for its contributions to rebuilding society after the 1994 genocide against the Tutsi in Rwanda. These women took on the role of reconstructing what had been damaged. In order to restore Rwanda the women created projects to improve the economy, establish peace, and offer new opportunities. The 13 women that started this organization were determined to speak out for injustices, especially against women, so they became a voice for change. The genocide incident caused great destruction; however, since 1994 the organization has grown to include 58 member associations. These women work hard to make the changes and help the minorities grow and develop.

The purpose of the organization is not only about the Rwanda genocide, even though that is when it had its greatest impact, it was created to enhance women activity and provide recognition in favor of women. Due to all of the discrimination women were facing back in the early 1990s, this was an effective way to put up fight. Because of this organization "Rwanda is amongst the best countries in the world in terms of women representation." Working with women was not enough to help society as whole, therefore, they ensured all human rights were being met so that there was no social injustice. Their achievements include "peacekeeping, conflict management, mediation and reconciliation that empower women in leadership roles." As well as helping soldiers, prisoners, and any discrimination within the people. Pro-Femmes received the 1996 UNESCO-Madanjeet Singh Prize for the promotion of tolerance and non-violence "for their outstanding contributions in rehabilitating families and communities devastated by mass violence, through their activities fostering a climate of peace based on tolerance and non-violence." They received the inaugural Gruber Prize for Women’s Rights in 2003.
