= Brewer (disambiguation) =

A brewer is someone who makes beer.

Brewer may also refer to:

== Literature ==
- Brewer (John Updike), a fictional city in Updike's Rabbit novels (1960–1990)
- Brewer's Dictionary of Phrase and Fable, a reference work of idiom and folklore (1895–2009)

== Places ==
- Brewer, Maine, a city near Bangor, Maine, US
- Brewer Normal Institute, a school in Greenwood, South Carolina, US
- Brewer Street, Soho, London, England
- Brewer Street, Oxford, England

== Sport ==
- Milwaukee Brewers, a major league baseball team in Wisconsin, US
  - Bernie Brewer, their mascot
- Arizona League Brewers, a minor league team in Phoenix
- Helena Brewers, a minor league team in Montana

== Other uses ==
- Brewer (surname)—lists people so named
- C. Brewer & Co., a Hawaiian agricultural company (founded 1826)
- Brewer Spectrophotometer, a model of instrument to measure ozone via UV
- Yakovlev Yak-28 (NATO: Brewer), a Soviet combat aircraft model (1960–1992)

== See also ==
- Brasseur
- Breuer
- Brouwer
- Brauer
- Brauner
- Brenner (disambiguation)
- Brewers (disambiguation)
- Brunner (disambiguation)
- Bronner
- Justice Brewer (disambiguation)
