= Brower =

Brower is an English surname. Notable people with the surname include:

- Ann Brower, American-New Zealand academic
- Brittany Brower, contestant in America's Next Top Model, 2005
- Charles H. Brower (1901–1984), American advertising executive, copywriter, and author
- Charles N. Brower, American judge
- David R. Brower (1912–2000), American environmentalist
- Edna Brower (1901–1951), first wife of John Diefenbaker, 13th Prime Minister of Canada
- Frank Brower (1823–1874), American blackface performer
- Jacob V. Brower, Minnesota writer and politician
- Jeffrey Brower, American philosopher
- Jim Brower (born 1972), American Major League Baseball pitcher
- Kenneth Brower, American environmental writer
- Louis Brower (1900–1994), American Major League Baseball player
- Ned Brower (born 1978), American drummer, actor, and model
- Pearl Kiyawn Nageak Brower, American academic administrator
- Reade Brower (born 1950s), newspaper magnate

== See also ==
- Brewer
- Brauer
- Brawer
- Brouwer
- Browser (disambiguation)
