= Brauer =

Brauer or Bräuer is a surname of German origin, meaning "brewer". Notable people with the name include:-

- Alfred Brauer (1894–1985), German-American mathematician, brother of Richard
- Arik Brauer (1929–2021), Austrian painter, poet, and actor, father of Timna Brauer
- August Brauer (1863–1917), German zoologist
- Cole Brauer (born 1994), American sailor
- Erich Brauer (1895–1942), German illustrator, ethnographer, and ethnologist
- Friedrich Moritz Brauer (1832–1904), Austrian entomologist and museum director
- Georg Brauer (1908–2001), German chemist
- Helga Brauer (1936–1991) was a of Schlager singer of the GDR.
- Ingrid Arndt-Brauer (born 1961), German politician; member of the Bundestag
- Jono Brauer (born 1981), Australian Olympic skier
- Max Brauer (1887–1973), German politician; First Mayor of Hamburg
- Michael Brauer (contemporary), American audio engineer
- Rich Brauer (born 1954), American politician from Illinois; state legislator since 2003
- Richard Brauer (1901–1977), German-American mathematician
- Richard H. W. Brauer (contemporary), American art museum director; eponym of the Brauer Museum of Art in Valparaiso, Indiana
- Simón Brauer (born 1973), Ecuadorian photographer and cinematographer
- S. H. Brauer (1899–1976), American politician from Nebraska
- Tage Brauer (1894–1988), Swedish Olympic high jumper
- Timna Brauer (born 1961), Austrian singer and songwriter, daughter of Arik Brauer
- Tiny Brauer (1909–1990), American actor
- Wilfried Brauer (1937–2014), German computer scientist

Bräuer

- Bruno Bräuer (1893–1947), German general officer and paratrooper; executed in Greece for war crimes
- Curt Bräuer (1889–1969), German diplomat; ambassador to Norway at the time of the German invasion

== See also ==
- Brasseur
- Brawer
- Breuer
- Brewer
- Brouwer
- Sládek
