= Brewers =

Brewers may refer to one of the following sports teams:

== Baseball ==
All based in the United States

- Milwaukee Brewers, a Major League Baseball team based in Milwaukee, Wisconsin, since 1970
  - Milwaukee Brewers (disambiguation), several other historical teams of the same name

=== Minor League Baseball ===
- Arizona Complex League Brewers, based in Phoenix, Arizona (active)
- Beloit Brewers, based in Beloit, Wisconsin (renamed)
- Berkshire Brewers, based in Pittsfield, Massachusetts (defunct)
- Evansville Brewers, based in Evansville, Indiana (defunct)
- Helena Brewers, based in Helena, Montana (defunct)
- Mahanoy City Brewers, based in Mahanoy City, Pennsylvania (defunct)
- Pikeville Brewers, based in Pikeville, Kentucky (defunct)
- Plattsburgh Brewers, based in Plattsburgh, New York (defunct)
- San Jose Brewers, based in San Jose, California (defunct)

== Other sports ==
- Brewers, the sports teams of Vassar College, located in Poughkeepsie, New York, U.S. (active)
- The Brewers, nickname of Burton Albion F.C., an English football club (active)
- Camden Brewers, a basketball team based in Camden, New Jersey, U.S. (defunct)
- Columbus Brewers, a semi-professional American football team based in Ohio, U.S. (defunct)

== See also ==
- Brewer (disambiguation)
- Brewing
