= Rachel Brouwer =

Canadian inventor

- Born: c. 2002; Bedford, Nova Scotia, Canada
- Education: Bedford Academy, Charles P. Allen High School, Dalhousie University, University of Toronto
- Occupations: Law Student, Inventor
- Known for: Developing a water purification system
- Awards: Gold Medal, Canada-Wide Science Fair; 2nd Place, Earth and Environmental Sciences, International Science and Engineering Fair; Asteroid (33504) Rebrouwer named after her by the International Astronomical Union

Rachel Brouwer (born 2001 or 2002) is a Canadian from Bedford, Nova Scotia, who while still a secondary student invented a new method of killing bacteria in drinking water which requires no fuel and uses material commonly available in third-world countries.

== Early life and education ==
Rachel Brouwer was a student at Bedford Academy when she invented her device. After graduation from Bedford Academy, Brouwer became a student at Charles P. Allen High School. She is currently completing her Juris Doctor and Master of Global Affairs at the University of Toronto. There, she is focusing on international human rights law and environmental law.

== Invention and awards ==
She started developing her purification system when she was eleven years old. She was inspired after reading about cholera in I Am Malala, the biography of Pakistani activist Malala Yousafzai, and seeing "do not drink" signs posted during a trip. The next year she demonstrated it at the Halifax Science Expo. Later, Brouwer entered her invention in the Canada-Wide Science Fair, and won a gold medal.

Brouwer's water pasteurizer is made of ABS pipe, plastic water bottles, cotton and charcoal. The water is heated in the sun and bacteria are killed by ultraviolet radiation; Brouwer created a temperature indicator made of soybean wax so that users can tell when the water is safe to drink.

In 2015 she was named a community hero by the Halifax Mooseheads. That year she began raising funds to patent her system, and to produce the wax temperature-indicators.

In 2016 Brouwer was one of eight students chosen to represent Canada at the International Science and Engineering Fair in Phoenix, Arizona. She came second in the Earth and Environmental Sciences category. As well as a $1,500 cash prize, she has had an asteroid named after her by the International Astronomical Union - (33504) Rebrouwer.

Plans were made to test the water purifier in Africa, and Brouwer has been invited to Pakistan by the Swat Relief Initiative the foundation Malala interned for to test it there.

After graduating from high school Rachel Brouwer became a political science student at Dalhousie University. While there she interacted with students from Africa including Kenya and Gambia. In discussing economic development the African students made repeat references to the importance of safe household water. Due to their interest and involvement, the Brouwer water purification device is being implemented in pilot projects in Kenya and Gambia.

== Personal ==
In addition to her scientific work, Brouwer plays on soccer teams and operates a small business selling skin-care products.
