= Brasseur =

Brasseur is a French-language surname, meaning "brewer" and may refer to:

A family of French actors:

- Albert Brasseur (1860–1932), a French actor
- Pierre Brasseur (1905–1972), a French actor
- Claude Brasseur (1936–2020), a French actor
- Alexandre Brasseur (born 1971), a French actor

A family of Luxembourgish politicians:

- Dominique Brasseur (1833–1906), a Luxembourgish politician
- Robert Brasseur (1870–1934), a Luxembourgish politician
- Xavier Brasseur (1865–1912), a Luxembourgish politician

Others:

- André Brasseur (born 1939), a Belgian musician
- Anne Brasseur (born 1950), a Luxembourgish politician
- Bo Brasseur (born 1998), Belgian long jumper
- Charles Étienne Brasseur de Bourbourg (1814–1874), a French historian
- Élisabeth Brasseur (1896–1972), French choral conductor
- Isabelle Brasseur (born 1970), a Canadian figure skater
- Justine Brasseur (born 2001), a Canadian pair skater
- Lucien Brasseur (1878–1960), French sculptor

== See also ==
- Brauer
- Breuer
- Brewer
- Brouwer
- Sládek
