= Brouwer =

Brouwer (also Brouwers and de Brouwer) is a Dutch and Flemish surname. The word brouwer means 'brewer'.

== Brouwer ==
- Adriaen Brouwer (1605–1638), Flemish painter
- Alexander Brouwer (b. 1989), Dutch beach volleyball player
- Andries Brouwer (b. 1953), Dutch mathematician and computer programmer
  - Brouwer–Haemers graph
- Bertha "Puck" Brouwer (1930–2006), Dutch sprinter
- Carolijn Brouwer (b. 1973), Dutch competitive sailor
- Christoph Brouwer (1559–1617), Dutch Catholic ecclesiastical historian
- Cornelis Brouwer (c. 1615–1681), Dutch Golden Age painter
- Cornelis Brouwer (1900–1952), Dutch long-distance runner
- Dirk Brouwer (1899–1941), Dutch architect and resistance member
- Dirk Brouwer (1902–1966), Dutch-American astronomer
  - Brouwer Award, Dirk Brouwer Award, 1746 Brouwer asteroid
- Emanuel Brouwer (1881–1954), Dutch gymnast
- George Brouwer, Australian lawyer, Ombudsman for Victoria
- Gijs Brouwer (b. 1996), Dutch tennis player
- Harm Brouwer (b. 1957), Dutch politician
- Hendrik Brouwer (1580–1643), Dutch explorer, admiral, and colonial administrator
  - Brouwer Route, route to the East Indies he devised
- Hendrik Albertus Brouwer (1886–1973), Dutch geologist and paleontologist
- Henk Brouwer (b. 1953), Dutch sprinter
- Hugo Brouwer (1913–1986), Dutch painter, sculptor, and ceramist.
- Ina Brouwer (b. 1950), Dutch politician
- Jack Brouwer (b. 1965), American engineer
- Jan Brouwer (b. 1940), Dutch football manager
- Joel Brouwer (b. 1968), American poet, professor and critic
- Johan Brouwer (1898–1943), Dutch Hispanist, author, and resistance member
- Jordy Brouwer (b. 1988), Dutch footballer
- L. E. J. Brouwer (1881–1966), Dutch mathematician and philosopher
  - Brouwer fixed-point theorem, Brouwer–Heyting–Kolmogorov interpretation, Brouwer–Hilbert controversy, Kleene–Brouwer order, Phragmen–Brouwer theorem
- Leo Brouwer (b. 1939), Cuban guitarist and composer
- Margaret Brouwer (b. 1940), American composer
- Matt Brouwer (b. 1976), Canadian singer/so ngwriter
- Matthijs Brouwer (b. 1980), Dutch field hockey player
- Michael Brouwer (b. 1993), Dutch football goalkeeper
- Miriam Brouwer (b. 1991), Canadian cyclist
- Puck Brouwer (1930–2006), Dutch sprinter
- Rachel Brouwer (b. c. 2001), Canadian inventor
- Rob Brouwer (b. 1982), Canadian rugby player
- Ronald Brouwer (b. 1979), Dutch field hockey player
- Sigmund Brouwer (b. 1959), Canadian writer
- Tessa Brouwer (b. 1991), Dutch swimmer
- Tiemen Brouwer (1916–1977), Dutch politician and Minister of Agriculture
- Troy Brouwer (b. 1985), Canadian ice hockey player
- Willem Brouwer (b. 1963), Dutch football player
- Willem Coenraad Brouwer (1877–1933), Dutch sculptor and ceramist
- Wouter Brouwer (1882–1961), Dutch fencer

== Brouwers ==
- Angela Brouwers (b. 1974), Dutch singer
- Davy Brouwers (b. 1988), Belgian footballer
- Dieudonné Brouwers (1874–1948), Belgian historian and archivist
- Dolf Brouwers (1912–1997), Dutch comedian, singer, and television actor
- Eef Brouwers (1939–2018), Dutch journalist
- Evert Brouwers (b. 1990), Dutch footballer
- Jeroen Brouwers (1940–2022), Dutch writer
- José Brouwers (1931–2025), Belgian stage director and actor
- Laura Brouwers (b. 1988), Dutch cricketer
- Luuk Brouwers (b. 1998), Dutch footballer
- Marco Brouwers (b. 1958), Dutch volleyball player
- Roel Brouwers (b. 1981), Dutch footballer

== De Brouwer ==
- Gordon de Brouwer, Australian economist
- Joëlle De Brouwer (b. 1950), French middle-distance runner
- Ninón Lapeiretta de Brouwer (1907–1989), Dominican composer and pianist
- Piet de Brouwer (1880–1953), Dutch archer
- Philippe De Brouwer (b. 1969), Belgian economist and banker
- Walter De Brouwer (b. 1957), Belgian internet and technology entrepreneur

== See also ==
- 1746 Brouwer, asteroid
- Brouwer (crater), lunar crater named after both Dirk Brouwer and L.E.J. "Bertus" Brouwer
- De Dolle Brouwers, Belgian brewery
- De Struise Brouwers, Belgian brewery
