= Maslowian portfolio theory =

Maslowian portfolio theory (MaPT) creates a normative portfolio theory based on human needs as described by Abraham Maslow. It is in general agreement with behavioral portfolio theory, and is explained in Maslowian Portfolio Theory: An alternative formulation of the Behavioural Portfolio Theory, and was first observed in Behavioural Finance and Decision Making in Financial Markets.

Maslowian portfolio theory is quite simple in its approach. It states that financial investments should follow human needs in the first place. All the rest is logic deduction. For each need level in Maslow's hierarchy of needs, some investment goals can be identified, and those are the constituents of the overall portfolio.

== Comparison with behavioral portfolio theory ==
Behavioral portfolio theory (BPT) as introduced by Statman and Sheffrin in 2001, is characterized by a portfolio that is fragmented. Unlike the rational theories, such as modern portfolio theory (Markowitz), where investors put all their assets in one portfolio, here investors have different portfolios for different goals. BPT starts from framing and hence concludes that portfolios are fragmented, and built up as layers. This indeed seems to be how humans construct portfolios. MaPT starts from the human needs as described by Maslow and uses these needs levels to create a portfolio theory.

The predicted portfolios in both BPT and MaPT are very similar:

- In BPT: safety layer, corresponds to the physiological and safety needs in MaPT
- Specific layer in BPT are the love needs and the esteem needs in MaPT
- Shot at richness in BPT is the self-actualization level in MaPT

One will notice that the main differences between MaPT and BPT are that:

- MaPT is derived from human needs, so it is to some extent a normative theory. BPT is strictly a descriptive theory.
- MaPT generates from the start more levels and more specific language to interact with the investor; however, theoretically BPT allows for the same portfolios.

== Portfolio optimization ==
Generally it seems that Roy's safety-first criterion is a good basis for portfolio selection, of course, including all generalizations developed later.

However in later work the author emphasized the importance of using a coherent risk measure . The problem with Roy's safety-first criterion is that it is equivalent to a Value at Risk optimization, which can lead to absurd results for returns that do not follow an elliptical distribution. A good alternative could be expected shortfall.

== Justification of the Theory ==
For many centuries, investing was the exclusive domain of the very rich (who did not have to worry about subsistence nor about specific projects). With this backdrop, Markowitz formulated in 1952 his “Mean Variance Criterion”, where money is the unique life goal. This is the foundation of “the investor’s risk profile” as today almost all advisors use. This Mean Variance theory concluded that all investments should be put in one optimal portfolio. The problem is that this is both impossible and meaningless (which is my optimal volatility, my unique time horizon, etc.).

However after World War II, the investor’s landscape dramatically changed and in a few decades more and more people not only could, but actually had to invest. Those people do have to worry about subsistence and real life-goals! This automatically leads to the notion that investing should start from human needs.

As Abraham Maslow described, human needs can each get focus at separate times and satisfaction of one need does not automatically lead to the cancellation of another need. This means that Maslow's description of human needs was the first description of the framing effect bias in human behaviour, this means that human needs are actually observed as in separate mental accounts (see mental accounting). Therefore must be addressed one by one and each in a separate mental account.

In 2001, Meir Statman and Hersh Shefrin, described that people have “Behavioural Portfolios”: not one optimized portfolio, but rather pockets of separate portfolios for separate goals.

In 2009, Philippe De Brouwer formulates his “Maslowian Portfolio Theory”. The idea is that for the average investor should keep a separate portfolio for each important life-goal. This created a new, normative theory that gave the justification to goal-based investing and on top of that provides a framework to use it in practice (so that no goals are forgotten and all goals are treated in a reasonable order).
