= Abdul Hai Kakkar =

Pakistani journalist

- Born: Zhob, Pakistan
- Education: University of Balochistan
- Occupations: Author, Radio Broadcaster, Journalist
- Years active: 2002–present
- Employer: Radio Mashaal
- Organization: Radio Free Europe/Radio Liberty
- Known for: He helped Noble laureate Malala Yousafzai write a blog about life under the Taliban, which helped bring her story to the world.

Abdul Hai Kakkar is a journalist who has worked as a BBC Urdu service correspondent in Peshawar, Pakistan.

Kakkar is responsible for unintentionally discovering Malala Yousafzai when, looking for a story, he asked her father, a school director, if any women at his school would be willing to write about living under the Taliban regime in Swat Valley. None agreed, so his daughter ended up doing it instead. Abdul Hai Kakar is currently working for RFE/RL's Radio Mashaal in Prague
