= Sladký =

Sladký (pronounced [ˈslatkiː]; feminine form Sladká [ˈslatkaː]) is a Czech and Slovak surname. It is derived from the Czech–Slovak word sladký for "sweet", originally a nickname for a "pleasant", "agreeable" person. People with the surname include:

- Alexandra Sladky Anderson (born 1955), American quilter, television host and author
- Jan Sladký Kozina (1652–1695), Czech revolutionary leader
- Jim Sladky (1947–2017), American ice dancer
- Judy Sladky (born 1950), American actress and ice dancer
- Martin Sladký (born 1992), Czech footballer

== See also ==
- Sládek
- Slatko
