= Malala Yousafzai =

Pakistani education activist (born 1997)

- ملاله یوسفزۍ
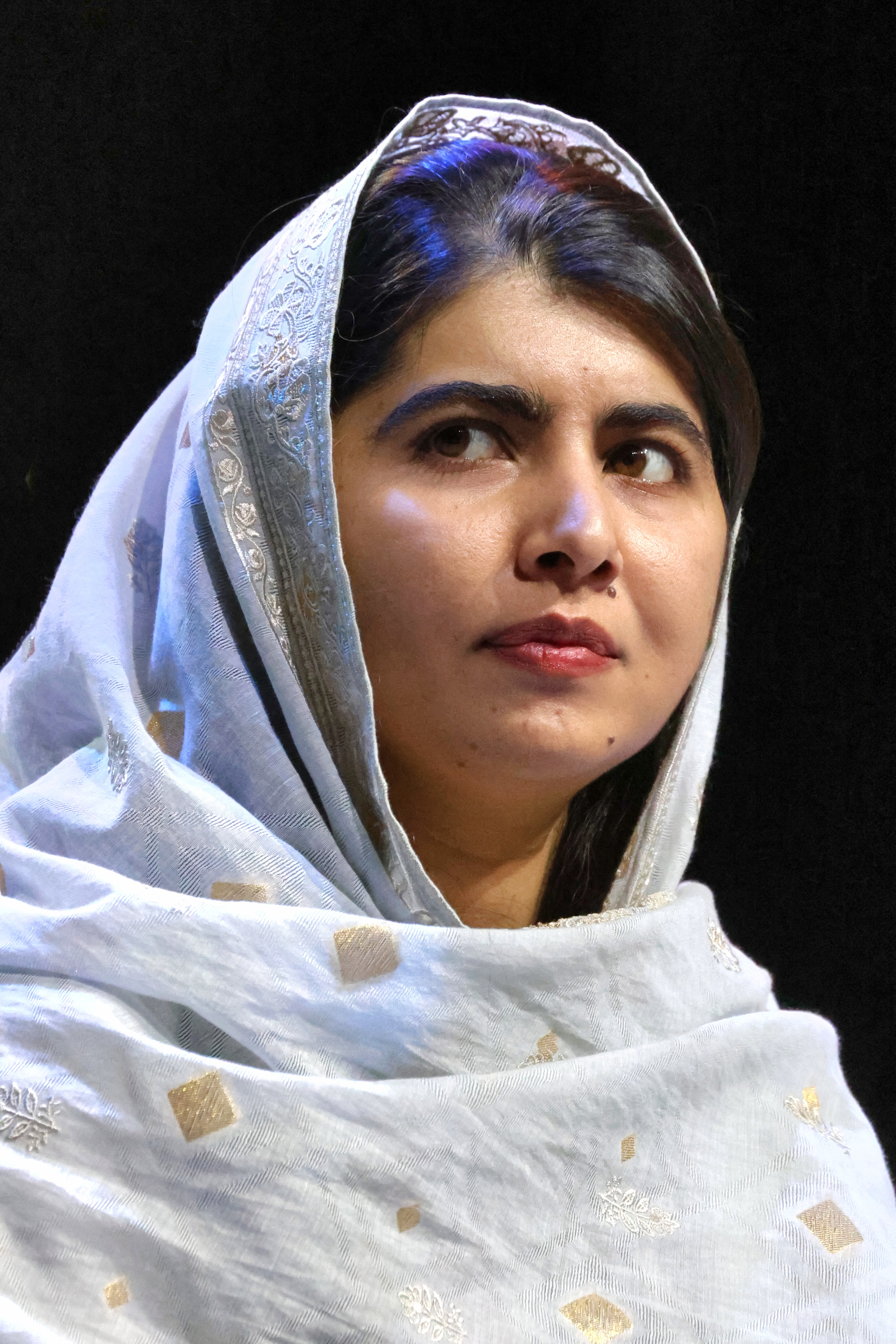
- Yousafzai in 2023
- Born: 12 July 1997 (age 29); Mingora, North-West Frontier Province, Pakistan
- Education: Lady Margaret Hall, Oxford (BA)
- Occupation: Activist for female education
- Organisation: Malala Fund
- Spouse: Asser Malik (m. 2021)
- Father: Ziauddin Yousafzai
- Honours: Nobel Peace Prize (2014); Forbes 30 under 30 (2016, 2022)
- Website: malala.org

Malala Yousafzai (Note: Urdu: ملالہ یوسفزئی; Pashto: ملاله یوسفزۍ, pronunciation: [məˈlaːlə jusəf ˈzəj]) (born 12 July 1997) is a Pakistani female education activist, and producer of film and television. She is the youngest Nobel Prize laureate in history, receiving the Peace Prize in 2014 at age 17, and is the second Pakistani and the only Pashtun to receive a Nobel Prize. Yousafzai is a human rights advocate for the education of women and children in her native district, Swat, where the Pakistani Taliban had at times banned girls from attending school. Her advocacy has grown into an international movement, and according to former prime minister Shahid Khaqan Abbasi, she has become Pakistan's "most prominent citizen".

The daughter of the education activist Ziauddin Yousafzai, she was born to a Yousafzai Pashtun family in Swat and was named after the Afghan folk heroine Malalai of Maiwand. Considering Bacha Khan, Barack Obama, and Benazir Bhutto as her role models, she was also inspired by her father's thoughts and humanitarian work. In early 2009, when she was 11, she wrote a blog under her pseudonym Gul Makai for the BBC Urdu to detail her life during the Taliban's occupation of Swat. The following summer, the journalist Adam B. Ellick made a New York Times documentary about her life as the Pakistan Armed Forces launched Operation Rah-e-Rast against the militants in Swat. In 2011, she received Pakistan's first National Youth Peace Prize. She interned for the Swat Relief Initiative, a foundation founded by Zebunisa Jilani, a princess of the Royal House of Swat which supports schools and clinics. She rose in prominence, giving interviews in print and on television, and was nominated for the International Children's Peace Prize by activist Desmond Tutu.

On 9 October 2012, while on a bus in Swat District after taking an exam, Yousafzai and two other girls were shot by a Taliban gunman in an assassination attempt targeting her for her activism; the gunman fled the scene. She was struck in the head by a bullet and remained unconscious and in critical condition at the Rawalpindi Institute of Cardiology, but her condition later improved enough for her to be transferred to the Queen Elizabeth Hospital in Birmingham, UK. The attempt on her life sparked an international outpouring of support. Deutsche Welle reported in January 2013 that she may have become "the most famous teenager in the world". Weeks after the attempted murder, a group of 50 leading Muslim clerics in Pakistan issued a fatwā against those who had tried to kill her. Governments, human rights organizations and feminist groups subsequently condemned the Tehrik-i-Taliban Pakistan. In response, the Taliban further denounced Yousafzai, indicating plans for a possible second assassination attempt which the Taliban felt was justified as a religious obligation. This sparked another international outcry.

After her recovery, Yousafzai became a more prominent activist for the right to education. Based in Birmingham, she co-founded the Malala Fund, a non-profit organisation, with Shiza Shahid. In 2013, she co-authored I Am Malala, an international best seller. In 2013, she received the Sakharov Prize, and in 2014, she was the co-recipient of the 2014 Nobel Peace Prize with Kailash Satyarthi of India. Aged 17 at the time, she was the youngest-ever Nobel Prize laureate. In 2015, she was the subject of the Oscar-shortlisted documentary He Named Me Malala. In 2016, she was selected for the Forbes 30 Under 30 list in the Social Entrepreneurs category. In 2022, Forbes added her to the "Hall of Fame" Forbes 30 under 30 list. The 2013, 2014 and 2015 issues of Time magazine featured her as one of the most influential people globally. In 2017, she was awarded honorary Canadian citizenship and became the youngest person to address the House of Commons of Canada. Yousafzai completed her secondary school education at Edgbaston High School, Birmingham in England from 2013 to 2017. From there she won a place at Lady Margaret Hall, Oxford, and undertook three years' study for a Bachelor of Arts degree in Philosophy, Politics and Economics (PPE), graduating in 2020. She returned in 2023 to become the youngest ever Honorary Fellow at Linacre College, Oxford.

== Early life ==
=== Childhood ===
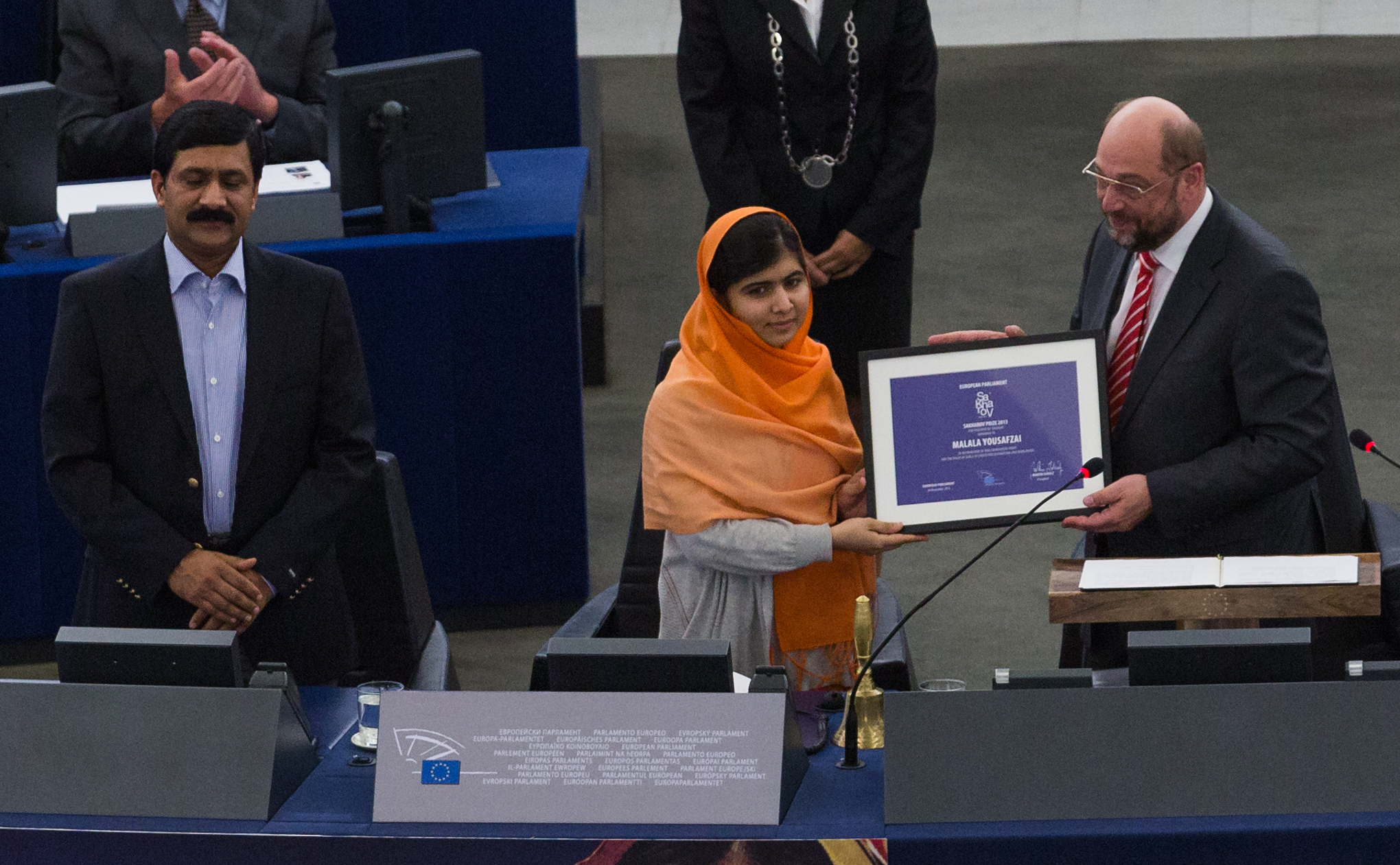
Yousafzai with her father (left) and Martin Schulz in Strasbourg, 2013

Yousafzai was born on 12 July 1997 in the Swat District of Pakistan's northwestern Khyber Pakhtunkhwa province, into a lower-middle-class family. She is the daughter of Ziauddin Yousafzai and Toor Pekai Yousafzai. Her family is Sunni Muslim of Pashtun ethnicity, belonging to the Yusufzai tribe. The family did not have enough money for a hospital birth and Yousafzai was born at home with the help of neighbours. She was given her first name Malala (meaning 'grief-stricken') after Malalai of Maiwand, a famous Pashtun poet and warrior woman from southern Afghanistan. At her house in Mingora, she lived with her two younger brothers, Khushal and Atal, her parents, Ziauddin and Tor Pekai, and two chickens.

Fluent in Pashto, Urdu, and English, Yousafzai was educated mostly by her father, Ziauddin Yousafzai, a poet, school owner, and an educational activist himself, running a chain of private schools known as the Khushal Public School. In an interview, she once said that she aspired to become a doctor, though later her father encouraged her to become a politician instead. Ziauddin referred to his daughter as something entirely special, allowing her to stay up at night and talk about politics after her two brothers had been sent to bed.

Inspired by the twice-elected, assassinated Prime Minister Benazir Bhutto, Yousafzai started speaking about education rights as early as September 2008, when her father took her to Peshawar to speak at the local press club. "How dare the Taliban take away my basic right to education?" she asked in a speech covered by newspapers and television channels throughout the region. In 2009, she began as a trainee and was then a peer educator in the Institute for War and Peace Reporting's Open Minds Pakistan youth programme, which worked in the region's schools to help students engage in constructive discussion on social issues through journalism, public debate and dialogue.

=== As a BBC blogger ===
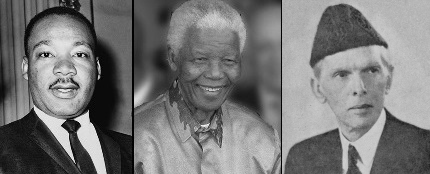
From left to right: Martin Luther King Jr., Nelson Mandela, and Muhammad Ali Jinnah have influenced Yousafzai.

In late 2008, Aamer Ahmed Khan of the BBC Urdu website and his colleagues came up with a novel way of covering the Pakistani Taliban's growing influence in Swat. They decided to ask a schoolgirl to blog anonymously about her life there. Their correspondent in Peshawar, Abdul Hai Kakar, had been in touch with a local school teacher, Ziauddin Yousafzai, but could not find any students willing to report, as their families considered it too dangerous. Finally, Yousafzai suggested his own daughter, 11-year-old Malala. At the time, Pakistani Taliban militants led by Maulana Fazlullah were taking over the Swat Valley, banning television, music, girls' education, and women from going shopping. Bodies of beheaded policemen were being displayed in town squares. At first, a girl named Aisha from her father's school agreed to write a diary, but her parents stopped her from doing it because they feared Taliban reprisals. The only alternative was Yousafzai, who was four years younger and in seventh grade at the time. "We had been covering the violence and politics in Swat in detail but we didn't know much about how ordinary people lived under the Taliban", said Mirza Waheed, former editor of BBC Urdu. Because they were concerned for Yousafzai's safety, the BBC editors insisted she use a pseudonym. Her blog was published under the byline "Gul Makai" ("cornflower" in Pashto), a name taken from a character in a Pashtun folktale.

On 3 January 2009, her first entry was posted to the BBC Urdu blog. She hand-wrote notes and passed them to a reporter who scanned and e-mailed them. The blog recorded Yousafzai's thoughts during the First Battle of Swat, as military operations took place, fewer girls would show up to school, and finally, her school shut down. That day, she wrote:

I had a terrible dream yesterday with military helicopters and the Taliban. I have had such dreams since the launch of the military operation in Swat. My mother made me breakfast and I went off to school. I was afraid going to school because the Taliban had issued an edict banning all girls from attending schools. Only 11 out of 27 pupils attended the class because the number decreased because of the Pakistani Taliban's edict. My three friends have shifted to Peshawar, Lahore and Rawalpindi with their families after this edict.

In Swat, the Pakistani Taliban had set an edict that no girls could attend school after 15 January 2009. They had already blown up more than 100 girls' schools. The night before the ban took effect was filled with the noise of artillery fire, waking Yousafzai several times. The following day, she also read for the first time excerpts from her blog that were published in a local newspaper.

==== Banned from school ====
Following the edict, the Pakistani Taliban destroyed several more local schools. On 24 January 2009, Yousafzai wrote: "Our annual exams are due after the vacations but this will only be possible if the Pakistani Taliban allow girls to go to school. We were told to prepare certain chapters for the exam but I do not feel like studying."

It seems that it is only when dozens of schools have been destroyed and hundreds others closed down that the army thinks about protecting them. Had they conducted their operations here properly, this situation would not have arisen.

— Malala Yousafzai, 24 January 2009 BBC blog entry

In February 2009, girls' schools were still closed. In solidarity, private schools for boys had decided not to open until 9 February, and notices appeared saying so. On 7 February, Yousafzai and her brother returned to their hometown of Mingora, where the streets were deserted, and there was an "eerie silence". She wrote in her blog: "We went to the supermarket to buy a gift for our mother but it was closed, whereas earlier it used to remain open till late. Many other shops were also closed." Their home had been robbed and their television was stolen.

After boys' schools reopened, the Pakistani Taliban lifted restrictions on girls' primary education, where there was co-education. Girls-only schools were still closed. Yousafzai wrote that only 70 pupils attended out of the 700 who were enrolled.

On 15 February, gunshots were heard in Mingora's streets, but Yousafzai's father reassured her, saying, "Don't be scared—this is firing for peace." Her father had read in the newspaper that the government and militants were going to sign a peace deal the next day. Later that night, when the Taliban announced the peace deal on their FM Radio studio, another round of stronger firing started outside. Yousafzai spoke out against the Pakistani Taliban on the national current affairs show Capital Talk on 18 February. Three days later, Tehreek-e-Nafaz-e-Shariat-e-Mohammadi leader Maulana Fazlullah announced on his FM radio station that he was lifting the ban on women's education, and girls would be allowed to attend school until exams were held on 17 March, but that they had to wear burqas.

==== Girls' schools reopen ====
On 25 February, Yousafzai wrote on her blog that she and her classmates "played a lot in class and enjoyed ourselves like we used to before." Attendance at Yousafzai's class was up to 19 of 27 pupils by 1 March, but the Pakistani Taliban were still active in the area. Shelling continued, and relief goods meant for displaced people were looted. Only two days later, Yousafzai wrote that there was a skirmish between the military and Taliban, and the sounds of mortar shells could be heard: "People are again scared that the peace may not last for long. Some people are saying that the peace agreement is not permanent, it is just a break in fighting."

On 9 March, Yousafzai wrote about a science paper that she performed well on, and added that the Taliban were no longer searching vehicles as they once did. Her blog ended on 12 March 2009.

=== As a displaced person ===
After the BBC diary ended, Yousafzai and her father were approached by New York Times reporter Adam B. Ellick about filming a documentary. In May, the Pakistani Army moved into the region to regain control during the Second Battle of Swat (also known as Operation Rah-e-Rast). Mingora was evacuated and Yousafzai's family was displaced and separated. Her father went to Peshawar to protest and lobby for support, while she was sent into the countryside to live with relatives. "I'm really bored because I have no books to read," she is filmed saying in the documentary.

That month, after criticising militants at a press conference, Yousafzai's father received a death threat over the radio by a Pakistani Taliban commander. Yousafzai was deeply inspired in her activism by her father. That summer, for the first time, she committed to becoming a politician and not a doctor, as she had once aspired to be.

I have a new dream ... I must be a politician to save this country. There are so many crises in our country. I want to remove these crises.

— Malala Yousafzai, Class Dismissed (documentary)

By early July, refugee camps were filled to capacity. The prime minister made a long-awaited announcement saying it was safe to return to the Swat Valley. The Pakistani military had pushed the Taliban out of the cities and into the countryside. Yousafzai's family reunited, and on 24 July 2009, they headed home. They made one stop first—to meet with a group of other grassroots activists that had been invited to see United States President Barack Obama's special representative to Afghanistan and Pakistan, Richard Holbrooke. Yousafzai pleaded with Holbrooke to intervene in the situation, saying, "Respected ambassador, if you can help us in our education, so please help us." When her family finally returned home, they found it had not been damaged, and her school had sustained only light damage.

=== Early activism ===
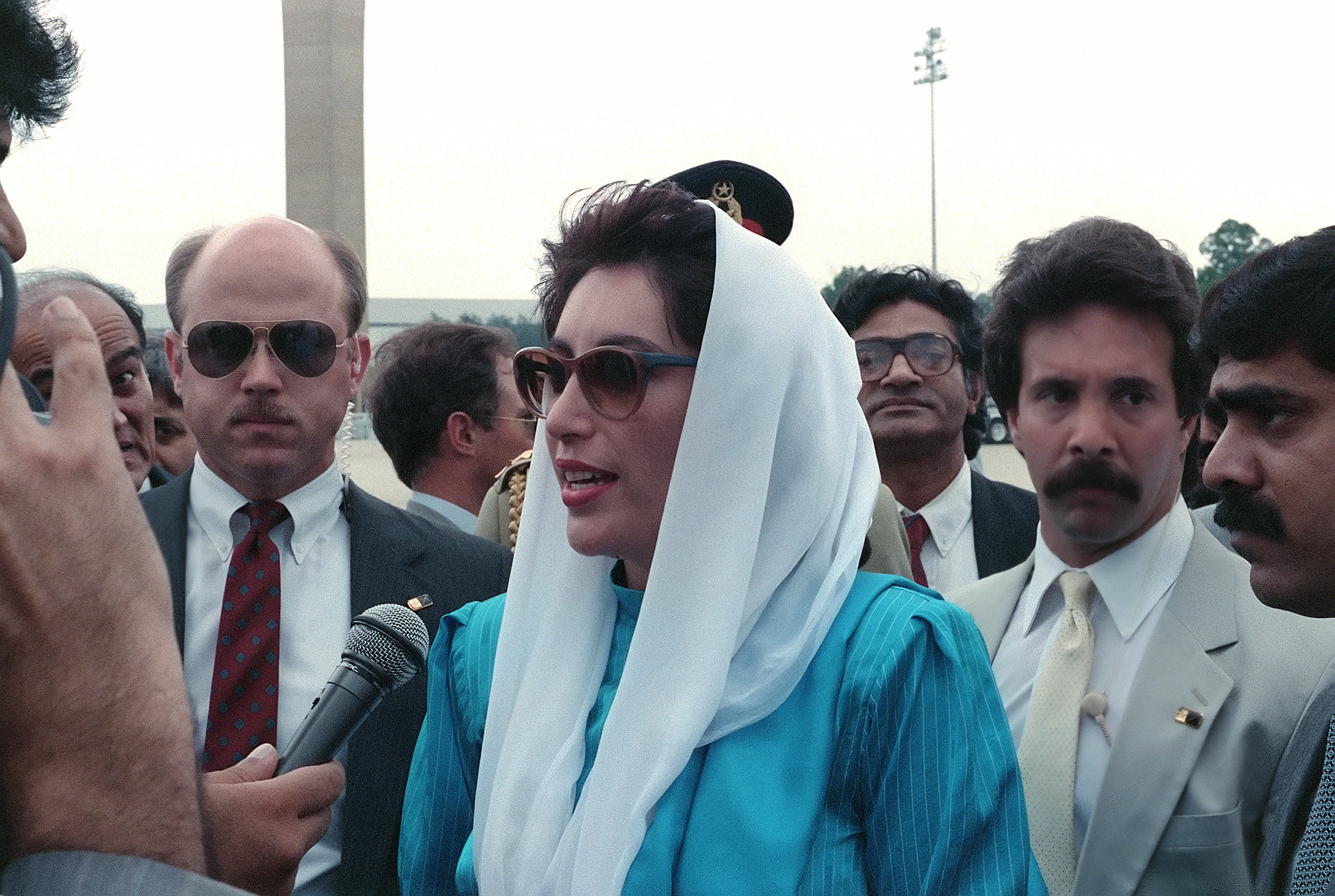
Prime Minister Benazir Bhutto, one of Yousafzai's sources of inspiration

Following the documentary, Yousafzai was interviewed on the national Pashto-language station AVT Khyber, the Urdu-language Daily Aaj, and Canada's Toronto Star. She made a second appearance on Capital Talk on 19 August 2009. Her BBC blogging identity was being revealed in articles by December 2009. She also began appearing on television to publicly advocate for female education. From 2009 to 2010, she was the chair of the District Child Assembly of the Khpal Kor Foundation.

In 2011, Yousafzai trained with local girls' empowerment organisation, Aware Girls, run by Gulalai Ismail, whose training included advice on women's rights and empowerment to peacefully oppose radicalisation through education.

In October 2011, Archbishop Desmond Tutu, a South African activist, nominated Yousafzai for the International Children's Peace Prize of the Dutch international children's advocacy group, KidsRights Foundation. She was the first Pakistani girl to be nominated for the award. The announcement said, "Malala dared to stand up for herself and other girls and used national and international media to let the world know girls should also have the right to go to school." The award was won by Michaela Mycroft of South Africa.

Yousafzai's public profile rose even further when she was awarded Pakistan's first National Youth Peace Prize two months later in December. On 19 December 2011, Prime Minister Yousaf Raza Gillani awarded her the National Peace Award for Youth. At the ceremony, she stated she was not a member of any political party, but hoped to found a national party of her own to promote education. The prime minister directed the authorities to set up an IT campus in the Swat Degree College for Women at Yousafzai's request, and a secondary school was renamed in her honour. By 2012, she was planning to organise the Malala Education Foundation, which would help poor girls go to school. In 2012, she attended the International Marxist Tendency National Marxist Summer School. In a television interview the same year, she named Barack Obama, Benazir Bhutto and Abdul Ghaffar Khan (Bacha Khan), a Pashtun leader known for his nonviolent Khudai Khidmatgar resistance movement against the British Raj, as inspirations for her activism.

== Assassination attempt ==
As Yousafzai became more recognised, the dangers facing her increased. Death threats against her were published in newspapers and slipped under her door. On Facebook, where she was an active user, she began to receive threats. Eventually, a Pakistani Taliban spokesman said they were "forced" to act. In a meeting held in the summer of 2012, Taliban leaders unanimously agreed to kill her.

I think of it often and imagine the scene clearly. Even if they come to kill me, I will tell them what they are trying to do is wrong, that education is our basic right.

— Malala Yousafzai envisioning a confrontation with the Taliban

On 9 October 2012, a Taliban gunman shot Yousafzai as she rode home on a bus after taking an exam in Pakistan's Swat Valley. Yousafzai was 15 years old at the time. According to reports, a masked gunman shouted: "Who is Malala?" Without any answer being given, Yousafzai was shot with one bullet, which travelled 18 inches (46 cm) from the side of her left eye, through her neck and landed in her shoulder. Two other girls were also wounded in the shooting: Kainat Riaz and Shazia Ramzan, both of whom were stable enough following the shooting to speak to reporters and provide details of the attack.

=== Medical treatment ===
After the shooting, Yousafzai was airlifted to a military hospital in Peshawar, where doctors were forced to operate after swelling developed in the left portion of her brain, which had been damaged by the bullet when it passed through her head. After a five-hour operation, doctors successfully removed the bullet, which had lodged in her shoulder near her spinal cord. The day following the attack, doctors performed a decompressive craniectomy, in which part of her skull was removed to allow room for swelling.

On 11 October 2012, a panel of Pakistani and British doctors decided to move Yousafzai to the Armed Forces Institute of Cardiology in Rawalpindi. Mumtaz Khan, a doctor, said that she had a 70% chance of survival. Interior Minister Rehman Malik said that Yousafzai would be moved to Germany, where she could receive the best medical treatment, as soon as she was stable enough to travel. A team of doctors would travel with her, and the government would bear the cost of her treatment. Doctors reduced Yousafzai's sedation on 13 October, and she moved all four limbs.

Offers to treat Yousafzai came from around the world. On 15 October, Yousafzai travelled to the United Kingdom, using a plane loaned by the UAE government for emergency purposes after an offer from the US government was denied due to the past history between Pakistan and the USA, for further treatment. This was approved by both her doctors and family. Her plane landed in Birmingham, England, where she was treated at the Queen Elizabeth Hospital; the hospital specializes in the treatment of military personnel injured in conflict. According to media reports at the time, the UK Government stated that "the Pakistani government is paying all transport, migration, medical, accommodation and subsistence costs for Malala and her party."

Yousafzai had come out of her coma by 17 October 2012, was responding well to treatment, and was said to have a good chance of fully recovering without any brain damage. Later updates on 20 and 21 October stated that she was stable, but was still battling an infection. By 8 November, she was photographed sitting up in bed. On 11 November, Yousafzai underwent surgery for eight and a half hours, in order to repair her facial nerve.

On 3 January 2013, Yousafzai was discharged from the hospital to continue her rehabilitation at her family's temporary home in the West Midlands, where she had weekly physiotherapy. She underwent a five-hour-long operation on 2 February to reconstruct her skull and restore her hearing with a cochlear implant, after which she was reported to be in stable condition. Yousafzai wrote in July 2014 that her facial nerve had recovered up to 96%.

=== Reaction ===
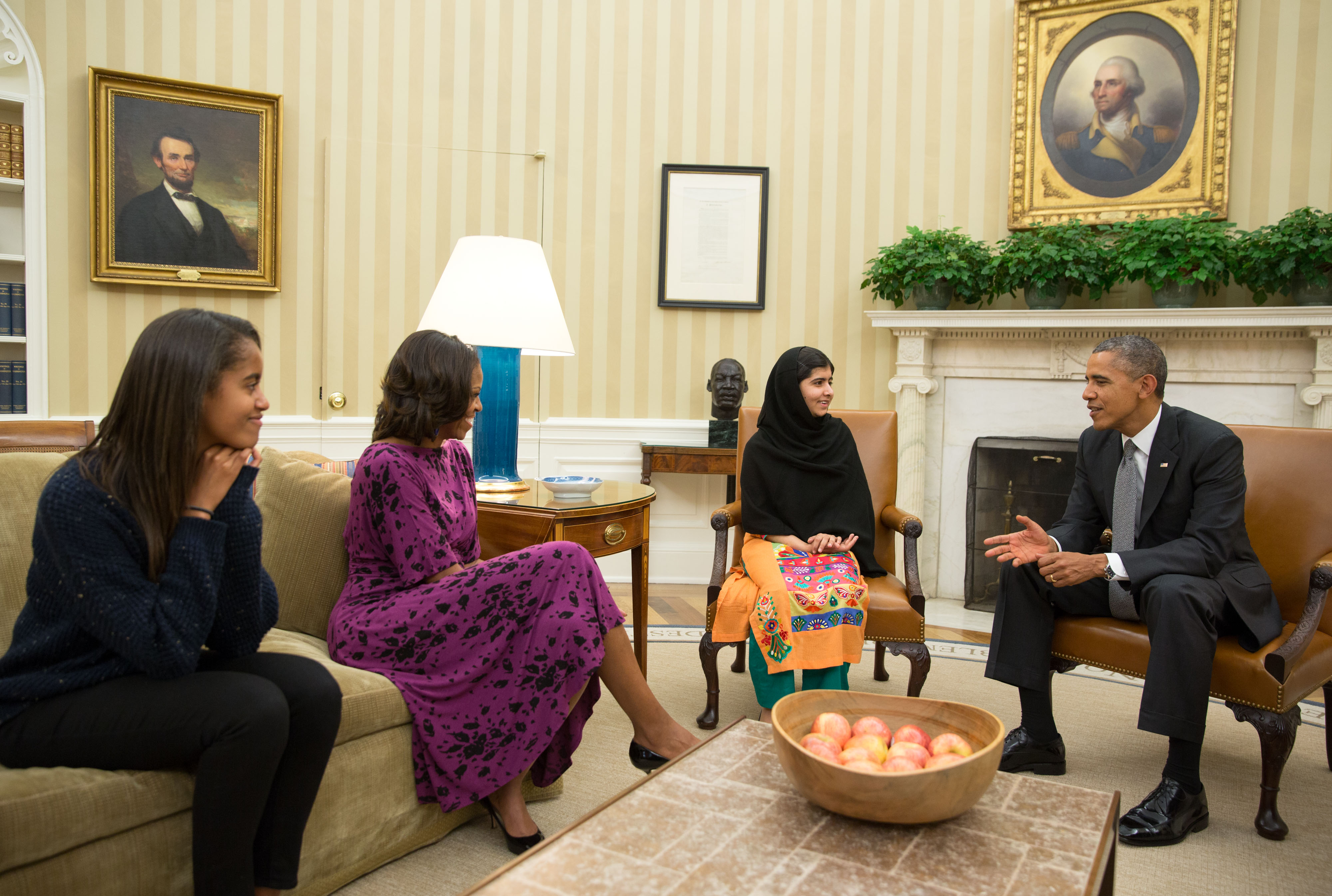
Barack Obama, Michelle Obama and their daughter Malia meet Yousafzai in the Oval Office, 11 October 2013.

The murder attempt received worldwide media coverage and produced an outpouring of sympathy and anger. Protests against the shooting were held in several Pakistani cities the day after the attack, and over 2 million people signed the Right to Education campaign's petition, which led to ratification of the first Right to Education Bill in Pakistan. Pakistani officials offered a 10 million rupee (≈US$105,000) reward for information leading to the arrest of the attackers. Responding to concerns about his safety, Yousafzai's father said: "We wouldn't leave our country if my daughter survives or not. We have an ideology that advocates peace. The Taliban cannot stop all independent voices through the force of bullets."

Pakistan's president Asif Ali Zardari described the shooting as an attack on "civilized people". UN Secretary-General Ban Ki-moon called it a "heinous and cowardly act". United States President Barack Obama found the attack "reprehensible, disgusting and tragic", while Secretary of State Hillary Clinton said Yousafzai had been "very brave in standing up for the rights of girls" and that the attackers had been "threatened by that kind of empowerment". British Foreign Secretary William Hague called the shooting "barbaric" and that it had "shocked Pakistan and the world".

American singer Madonna dedicated her song "Human Nature" to Yousafzai at a concert in Los Angeles the day of the attack, and also had a temporary Malala tattoo on her back. American actress Angelina Jolie wrote an article explaining the event to her children and answering questions like "Why did those men think they needed to kill Malala?" Jolie later donated $200,000 to the Malala Fund for girls' education. Former First Lady of the United States, Laura Bush wrote an op-ed piece in The Washington Post in which she compared Yousafzai to Holocaust diarist Anne Frank.

Ehsanullah Ehsan, chief spokesman for the Pakistani Taliban, claimed responsibility for the attack, saying that Yousafzai "is the symbol of the infidels and obscenity", adding that if she survived, the group would target her again. In the days following the attack, the Pakistani Taliban reiterated its justification, saying Yousafzai had been brainwashed by her father: "We warned him several times to stop his daughter from using dirty language against us, but he didn't listen and forced us to take this extreme step." The Pakistani Taliban also justified its attack as part of religious scripture, stating that the Quran says that "people propagating against Islam and Islamic forces would be killed", going on to say that "Sharia says that even a child can be killed if he is propagating against Islam".

On 12 October 2012, a group of Islamic clerics in Pakistan issued a fatwā – a ruling of Islamic law – against the Taliban gunmen who had tried to kill Yousafzai. Islamic scholars from the Sunni Ittehad Council publicly denounced attempts by the Pakistani Taliban to mount religious justifications for the shooting of Yousafzai and two of her classmates.

Although the attack was roundly condemned in Pakistan, "some fringe Pakistani political parties and extremist outfits" have aired conspiracy theories, such as the shooting being staged by the American Central Intelligence Agency to provide an excuse for continuing drone attacks. The Pakistani Taliban and some other pro-Pakistani Taliban elements branded Yousafzai an "American spy".

=== United Nations petition ===
On 15 October 2012, UN Special Envoy for Global Education, Gordon Brown, the former British Prime Minister, visited Yousafzai while she was in the hospital, and launched a petition in her name and "in support of what Malala fought for". Using the slogan "I am Malala", the petition's main demand was that there be no child left out of school by 2015, with the hope that "girls like Malala everywhere will soon be going to school". Brown said he would hand the petition to President Zardari in Islamabad in November.

The petition contains three demands:

- We call on Pakistan to agree to a plan to deliver education for every child.
- We call on all countries to outlaw discrimination against girls.
- We call on international organisations to ensure the world's 61 million out-of-school children are in education by the end of 2015.

=== Criminal investigation, arrests, and acquittals ===
The day after the shooting, Pakistan's Interior Minister Rehman Malik stated that the Taliban gunman who shot Yousafzai had been identified. Police named 23-year-old Atta Ullah Khan, a graduate student in chemistry, as the gunman in the attack. As of 2015, he remained at large, possibly in Afghanistan.

The police also arrested six men for involvement in the attack, but they were later released due to lack of evidence. In November 2012, US sources confirmed that Mullah Fazlullah, the cleric who ordered the attack on Yousafzai, was hiding in eastern Afghanistan. He was killed by a U.S.-Afghan air strike in June 2018.

On 12 September 2014, ISPR Director, Major General Asim Bajwa, told a media briefing in Islamabad that the 10 attackers belonged to a militant group called "Shura". General Bajwa said that Israrur Rehman was the first member of the militant group to be identified and apprehended by troops. Acting upon the information received during his interrogation, all other members of the militant group were arrested. It was an intelligence-based joint operation conducted by ISI, police, and the military.

In April 2015, it was first reported that the ten men who had been arrested were sentenced to life in prison by Judge Mohammad Amin Kundi, a counterterrorism judge, with the chance of eligibility for parole, and possible release, after 25 years. It is not known whether the actual would-be murderers were among the ten sentenced. But in June it was revealed that eight of the ten men, who were tried in-camera for the attack, and actually confessed to helping plan the attack, had in fact been acquitted in the secret trial. Insiders revealed that one of the men acquitted and freed had been the mastermind behind the murder bid. It is believed that all the other men involved in the shooting of Yousafzai fled to Afghanistan soon afterwards and were never even captured. The information about the release of suspects came to light after the London Daily Mirror attempted to locate the men in prison. Senior police official Salim Khan and the Pakistan High Commission in London stated that the eight men were released because there was not enough evidence to connect them to the attack.

According to Yousafzai's statement in October 2025, the two convicted men were recently released after 10 years in prison.

== Education ==
From March 2013 to July 2017, Yousafzai was a pupil at the all-girls Edgbaston High School in Birmingham. In August 2015, she received 6 A*s and 4 As at GCSE level. At A-Level, she studied Geography, History, Mathematics and Religious Studies. Also applying to Durham University, the University of Warwick and the London School of Economics (LSE), Yousafzai was interviewed at Lady Margaret Hall, Oxford in December 2016 and received a conditional offer of three As in her A‑Levels; in August 2017, she was accepted to study Philosophy, Politics and Economics (PPE).

In February 2020, climate change activist Greta Thunberg travelled to Oxford University to meet Yousafzai. On 19 June 2020, Yousafzai said after passing her final examinations that she had completed her PPE degree at Oxford; she graduated with honours.

== Continuing activism ==
Traditions are not sent from heaven, they are not sent from God. It is we who make cultures and we have the right to change it and we should change it.

— Yousafzai at the Girl Summit in London

Innocent victims are killed in these acts, and they lead to resentment among the Pakistani people. If we refocus efforts on education it will make a big impact.

— Yousafzai expressing her concerns to Barack Obama that drone attacks are fueling terrorism

I am convinced Socialism is the only answer and I urge all comrades to take this struggle to a victorious conclusion. Only this will free us from the chains of bigotry and exploitation.

— Yousafzai expressing her belief in socialism in a letter to a meeting of Pakistani Marxists in Lahore

Yousafzai addressed the United Nations in July 2013, and had an audience with Queen Elizabeth II in Buckingham Palace. In September, she spoke at Harvard University, and in October, she met with US President Barack Obama and his family; during that meeting, she confronted him on his use of drone strikes in Pakistan. In December, she addressed the Oxford Union. In July 2014, Yousafzai spoke at the Girl Summit in London. In October 2014, she donated $50,000 to the UNRWA for reconstruction of schools on the Gaza Strip.

Even though she was fighting for women's rights as well as children's rights, Yousafzai did not describe herself as a feminist when asked on Forbes Under 30 Summit in 2014. In 2015, Yousafzai told Emma Watson she decided to call herself a feminist after hearing Watson's speech at the UN launching the HeForShe campaign.

On 12 July 2015, her 18th birthday, Yousafzai opened a school in the Bekaa Valley, Lebanon, near the Syrian border, for Syrian refugees. The school, funded by the not-for-profit Malala Fund, offers education and training to girls aged 14 to 18 years. Yousafzai called on world leaders to invest in "books, not bullets".

Yousafzai has repeatedly condemned the Rohingya persecution in Myanmar. In June 2015, the Malala Fund released a statement in which Yousafzai argues that the Rohingya people deserve "citizenship in the country where they were born and have lived for generations" along with "equal rights and opportunities." She urges world leaders, particularly in Myanmar, to "halt the inhuman persecution of Burma's Muslim minority Rohingya people." In September 2017, speaking in Oxford, Yousafzai said: "This should be a human rights issue. Governments should react to it. People are being displaced, they're facing violence." Yousafzai also posted a statement on Twitter calling for Nobel Peace Prize laureate Aung San Suu Kyi to condemn the treatment of the Rohingya people in Myanmar. Suu Kyi has avoided taking sides in the conflict, or condemning violence against the Rohingya people, leading to widespread criticism.

In 2014, Yousafzai stated that she wished to return to Pakistan following her education in the UK, and inspired by Benazir Bhutto, she would consider running for prime minister: "If I can help my country by joining the government or becoming the prime minister, I would definitely be up for this task." She repeated this aim in 2015 and 2016. However, Yousafzai noted in 2018 that her goal had changed, stating that "now that I have met so many presidents and prime ministers around the world, it just seems that things are not simple and there are other ways that I can bring the change that I want to see." In a 2018 interview with David Letterman for Netflix's show My Next Guest Needs No Introduction, Yousafzai was asked: "Would you ever want to hold a political position?" She replied: "Me? No."

=== Representation ===
Former British Prime Minister Gordon Brown arranged for Yousafzai's appearance before the United Nations in July 2013. Brown also requested that McKinsey consultant Shiza Shahid, a friend of the Yousafzai family, chair Yousafzai's charity fund, which had gained the support of Angelina Jolie. Google's vice-president Megan Smith also sits on the fund's board.

In November 2012, the consulting firm Edelman began work for Yousafzai on a pro bono basis, which according to the firm "involves providing a press office function for Malala". The office employs five people, and is headed by speechwriter Jamie Lundie. McKinsey also continues to provide assistance to Yousafzai.

=== Malala Day ===
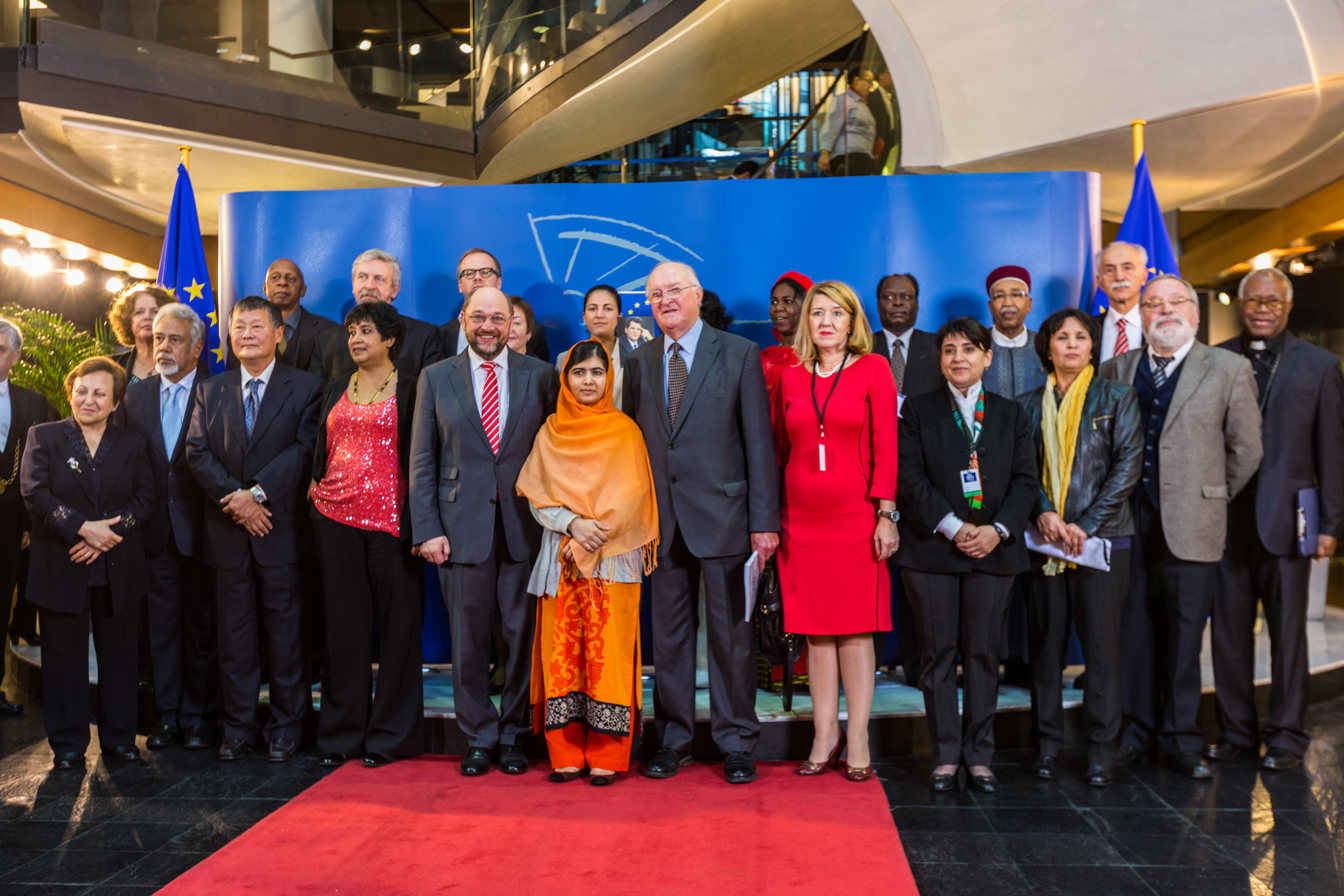
Yousafzai on a special visit to Strasbourg in November 2013

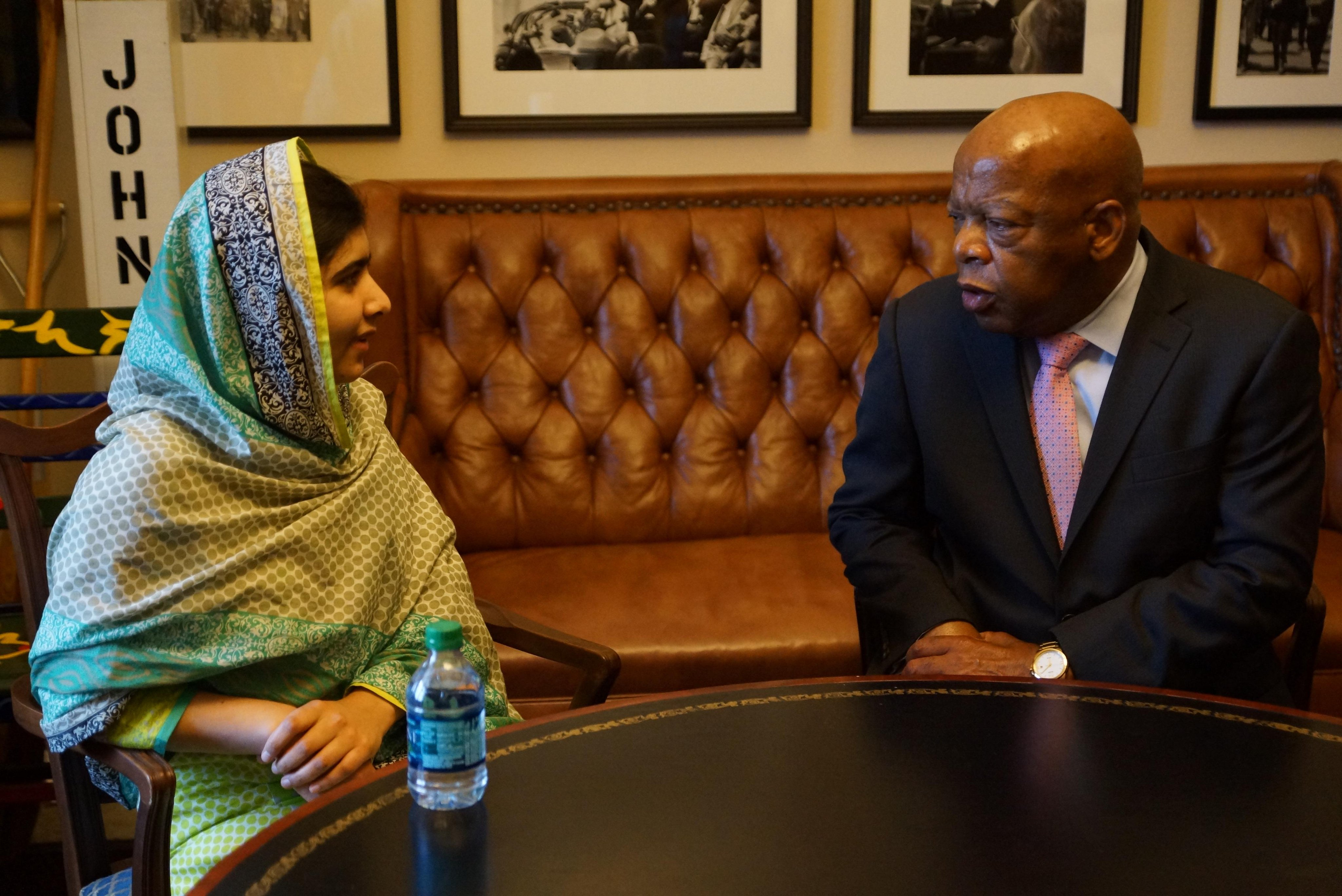
Malala with Congressman and civil rights leader John Lewis in 2015

On 12 July 2013, Yousafzai's 16th birthday, she spoke at the UN to call for worldwide access to education. The UN dubbed the event "Malala Day". Yousafzai wore one of Benazir Bhutto's shawls to the UN. It was her first public speech since the attack, leading the first ever Youth Takeover of the UN, with an audience of over 500 young education advocates from around the world.

The terrorists thought they would change my aims and stop my ambitions, but nothing changed in my life except this: weakness, fear and hopelessness died. Strength, power and courage was born ... I am not against anyone, neither am I here to speak in terms of personal revenge against the Taliban or any other terrorist group. I'm here to speak up for the right of education for every child. I want education for the sons and daughters of the Taliban and all terrorists and extremists.

Yousafzai received several standing ovations. Ban Ki-moon, who also spoke at the session, described her as "our hero". Yousafzai also presented the chamber with "The Education We Want", a Youth Resolution of education demands written by Youth for Youth, in a process co-ordinated by the UN Global Education First Youth Advocacy Group, telling her audience:

Malala day is not my day. Today is the day of every woman, every boy and every girl who have raised their voice for their rights.

The Pakistani government did not comment on Yousafzai's UN appearance, amid a backlash against her in Pakistan's press and social media.

Words from the speech were used as lyrics for "Speak Out", a song by Kate Whitley commissioned by BBC Radio 3 and broadcast on International Women's Day 2017.

=== Jon Stewart interview ===
On 8 October 2013, Malala, at the age of 16, visited The Daily Show with Jon Stewart, an American television programme, her first major late night appearance. She was there as a guest to promote her book, I Am Malala. On the program they discussed her assassination attempt, human rights, and women's education. She left Jon Stewart speechless when she described her thoughts after learning the Pakistani Taliban wanted her dead, saying:

I started thinking about that, and I used to think that the Talib would come, and he would just kill me. But then I said, "If he comes, what would you do Malala?" then I would reply to myself, "Malala, just take a shoe and hit him." But then I said, "If you hit a Talib with your shoe, then there would be no difference between you and the Talib. You must not treat others with cruelty and that much harshly, you must fight others but through peace and through dialogue and through education." Then I said I will tell him how important education is and that "I even want education for your children as well." And I will tell him, "That's what I want to tell you, now do what you want."

Stewart, visibly moved by her words, ended the conversation saying: "I am humbled to speak with you." Stewart would again have her as a guest on the show after the 2015 Charleston Church Shooting, in which he started the show citing no jokes saying, "our guest is an incredible person who suffered unspeakable violence by extremists and her perseverance and determination through that to continue on is an incredible inspiration and to be quite honest with you, I don't think there's anyone else in the world I would rather talk to tonight than Malala so that's what we'll do and sorry about no jokes."

Malala returned to The Daily Show in December 2025 to discuss her memoir Finding My Way.

=== Nobel Peace Prize ===
External videos
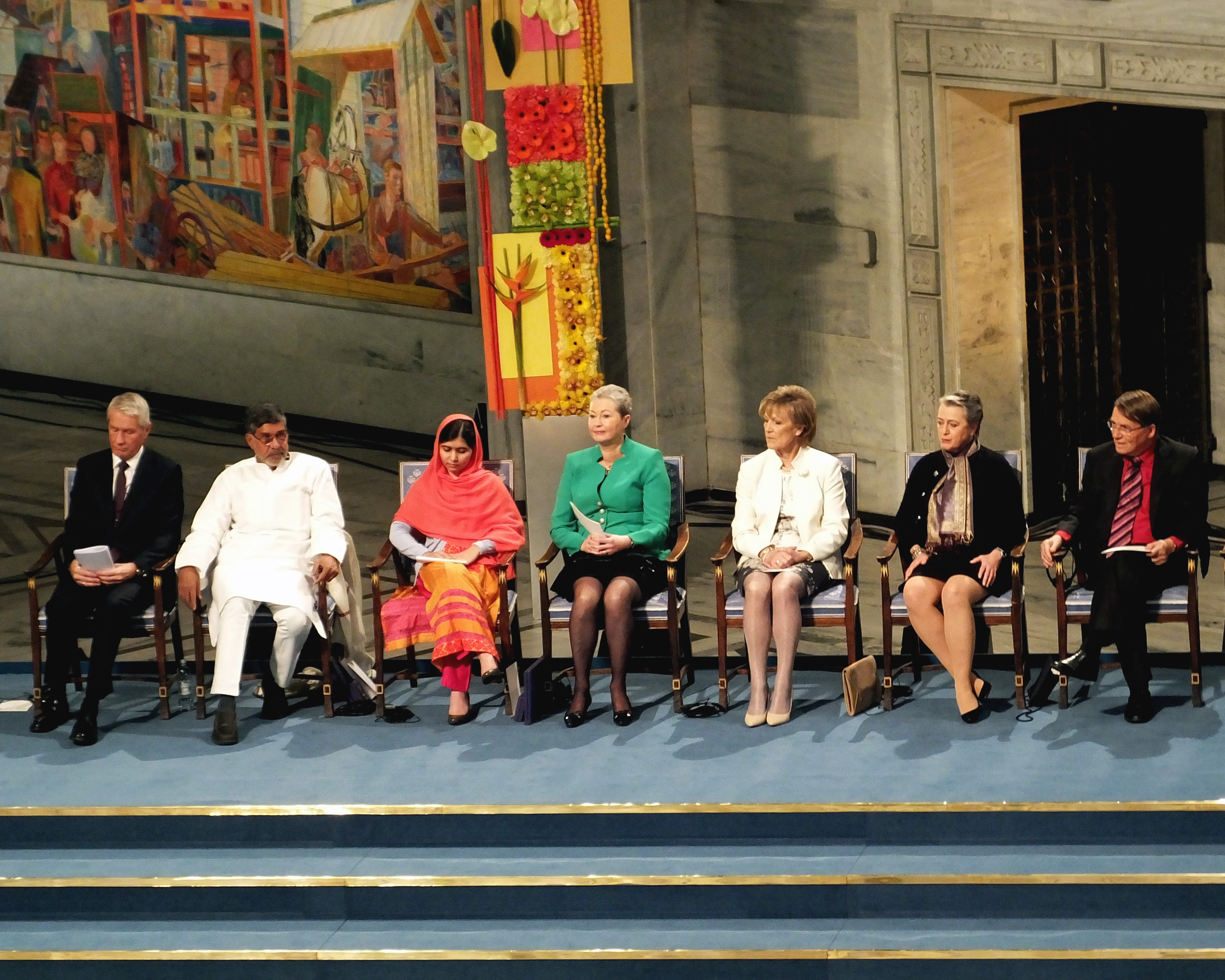
- Nobel Lecture by Malala Yousafzai

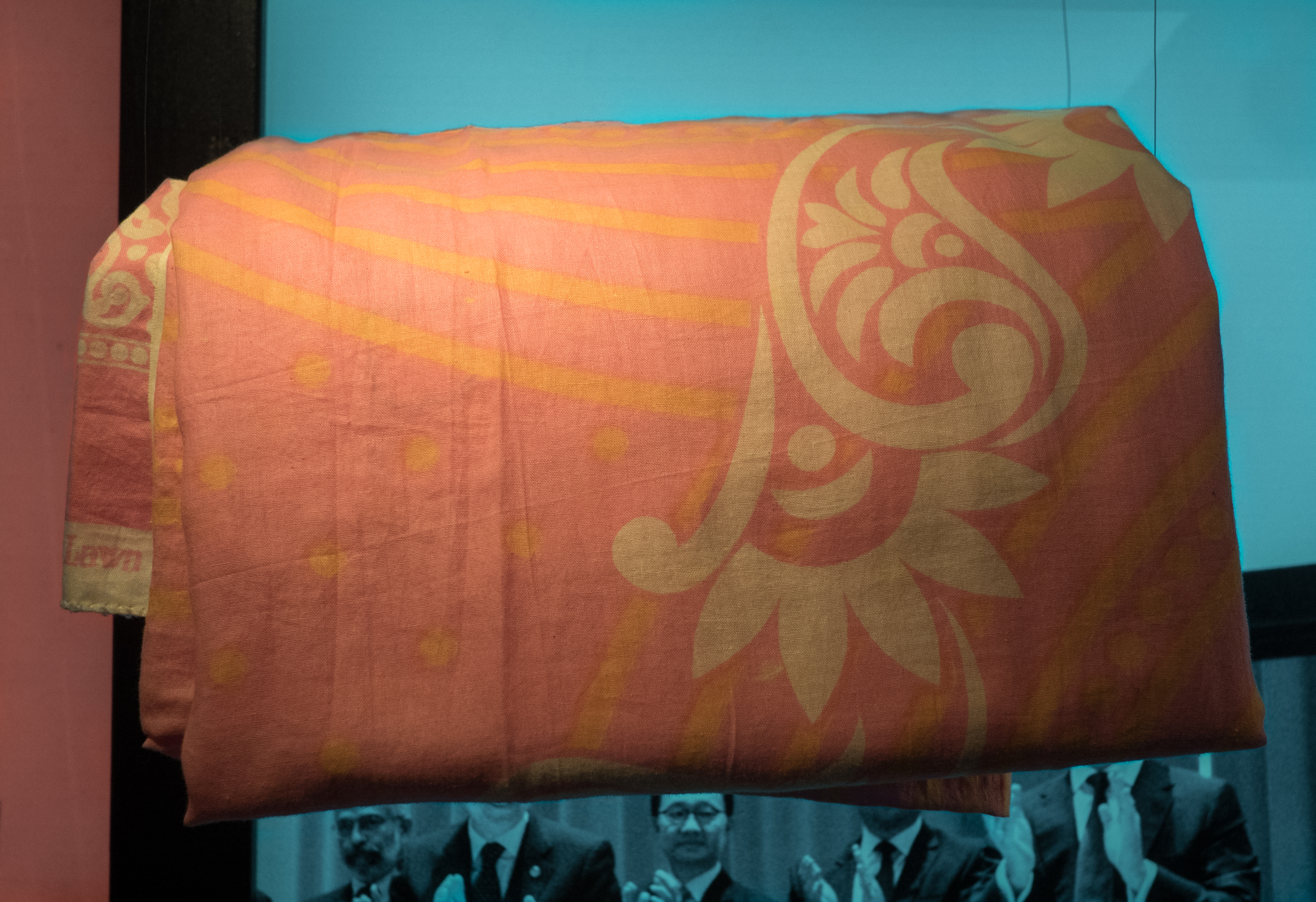
Yousafzai's shawl on display at the Nobel Prize Museum

On 10 October 2014, Yousafzai was announced as the co-recipient of the 2014 Nobel Peace Prize for her struggle against the suppression of children and young people and for the right of all children to education. Having received the prize at the age of 17, Yousafzai is the youngest Nobel laureate. Yousafzai shared the prize with Kailash Satyarthi, a children's rights activist from India. She is the second Pakistani to receive a Nobel Prize after 1979 Physics laureate Abdus Salam.

After she was awarded the Nobel Peace Prize, there was praise, but also some disapproval of the decision. A Norwegian jurist, Fredrik Heffermehl, commented on being awarded the Nobel Prize: "This is not for fine people who have done nice things and are glad to receive it. All of that is irrelevant. What Nobel wanted was a prize that promoted global disarmament."

Adán Cortés, a college student from Mexico City and asylum seeker, interrupted Yousafzai's Nobel Peace Prize award ceremony in protest for the 2014 Iguala mass kidnapping in Mexico, but was quickly taken away by security personnel. Yousafzai later sympathised, and acknowledged that problems are faced by young people all over the world, saying "there are problems in Mexico, there are problems even in America, even here in Norway, and it is really important that children raise their voices".

=== David Letterman interview ===
In March 2018, Yousafzai was the subject of an interview with David Letterman for his Netflix show My Next Guest Needs No Introduction. Speaking about the Taliban, she opined that their misogyny comes from a superiority complex, and is reinforced by finding "excuses" in culture or literature, such as by misinterpreting teachings of Islam. On the topic of her attackers, Yousafzai comments: "I forgive them because that's the best revenge I can have." Pointing out that the person who attacked her was a young boy, she says: "He thought he was doing the right thing".

When Yousafzai was asked about the first presidency of Donald Trump, she said: "Some of the things have really disappointed me, like sexual harassment and the ban on Muslims and racism." She also criticised the Trump administration's proposed budget cuts to education, saying that education is the first step to "eradicating extremism and ending poverty". Throughout the episode, clips are shown of Yousafzai acting as a tour guide for prospective students to her college Lady Margaret Hall, Oxford.

=== Afghanistan ===
In July 2021, amid a major offensive by the Taliban insurgents, Yousafzai urged the international community to press for an immediate ceasefire in Afghanistan and provide humanitarian aid to Afghan civilians. Following the Taliban takeover of Kabul on 15 August 2021, she expressed concern about the fate of women's rights, fearing that women in Afghanistan would lose the social and educational gains that had been made during the previous Afghan government's two decades.

Yousafzai condemned the Taliban's ban on girls' education beyond 6th grade, and said "the Taliban will continue to make excuses to prevent girls from learning beyond primary school." She said the Taliban "want to erase girls and women from all public life in Afghanistan," and asked "leaders around the world to take collective action to hold the Taliban accountable for violating the human rights of millions of women and girls."

=== Women's clothing, marriage ===
Yousafzai had said that she did not understand why people had to marry. After her own marriage in 2021 she said that she had not been against marriage, but had concerns about it related to child marriage and forced marriage, and unequal marriages where "women make more compromises than men". In her own marriage she felt that she had found a person who understood her values.

On 7 March 2022, Yousafzai advocated for every woman's right to decide to wear what she likes for herself, from a burqa to a bikini: "Come and talk to us about individual freedom and autonomy, about preventing harm and violence, about education and emancipation. Do not come with your wardrobe notes." According to Yousafzai, "refusing to let girls go to school in their hijabs is horrifying".

Malala also spoke against forced conversions of under-aged minority girls in Pakistan. She said "It should be a personal choice and no one, especially a child shouldn't be forced to accept any faith or convert to any other religion out of the will".

== Personal life ==
On 9 November 2021, Yousafzai married Asser Malik, a manager with the Pakistan Cricket Board, in Birmingham.

She is a supporter of Birmingham City of the Premier League and the Philadelphia Eagles of the National Football League.

Yousafzai is a practising Sunni Muslim. In an interview with Muslim Girl, she stated, "[The Islamic] faith has always been a big part of my life – and it continues to be so today." She has also defended her practice of wearing a shayla.

== Reception ==
Yousafzai's opposition to the policy of Talibanization made her unpopular in Pakistan among Taliban sympathisers. A Dawn columnist said she was scapegoated by the "failing state government," and a journalist in The Nation wrote Yousafzai was hated by "overzealous patriots" who were keen to deny the oppression of women in Pakistan. Her statements conflicted with the view that militancy in Pakistan was a result of Western interference, and conservatives and Islamic fundamentalists described her ideology as "anti-Pakistan".

Many Pakistanis view her as an "agent of the West", due to her Nobel prize, Oxford education and residence in England; however, Yousafzai is seen as courageous by some Pakistanis. Farman Nawaz argued in The Daily Afghanistan that Yousafzai may suffer the fate of Pakistani scientist Dr. Abdus Salam, "who even after winning the Nobel Prize could not win the hearts of Pakistanis".

In 2015, the All Pakistan Private Schools Federation (APPSF) banned her autobiographical book, I Am Malala, at all Pakistani private schools, with the APPSF president Mirza Kashif Ali releasing his own book against her, I Am Not Malala. His book accused Yousafzai of attacking the Pakistan Armed Forces under the pretence of female education, described her father as a "double agent" and "traitor", and denounced the Malala Fund's promotion of secular education. However, Ali pointed out that the APPSF had gone on a national strike when Yousafzai was attacked by the Pakistani Taliban.

Conspiracy theorists in newspapers and social media alleged that Yousafzai had staged her assassination attempt, or that she was an agent of the US Central Intelligence Agency (CIA). Another conspiracy theory alleges that Yousafzai is a Jewish agent.

On 29 March 2018, Yousafzai returned to Pakistan for the first time since the shooting. Meeting Prime Minister Shahid Khaqan Abbasi, she gave a speech in which she said it had been her dream to return without any fear. Yousafzai then visited her hometown Mingora in Swat District, Khyber Pakhtunkhwa. She vowed to return to her country after studies, and responding to criticism, said "I am proud of my religion and country."

On 7 August 2019, following the Indian revocation of the special status of Jammu and Kashmir, Yousafzai urged the UN to help Kashmiri children go safely back to school in response to the Indian Government's lockdown and communications blackout in the Kashmir valley and expressed her concern about the situation, and appealed to the international community to ensure peace in Jammu and Kashmir. People in India accused her of spreading the "Pakistani agenda" over the Kashmir conflict, and being selective in condemning human rights abuses, while in Pakistan she was criticised for being late in her response.

After the start of Gaza–Israel conflict in October 2023, Yousafzai drew criticism for being silent over Israel's genocide in Gaza and her "hypocritical" support statement about the conflict. She was condemned by Pakistani authors Nida Kirmani and Mehr Tarar over a Broadway musical she co-produced with former US Secretary of State Hillary Clinton, who had rejected calls for ceasefire in Gaza. After a severe backlash, Yousafzai reaffirmed her support for people of Gaza and called for a ceasefire.

== Works ==
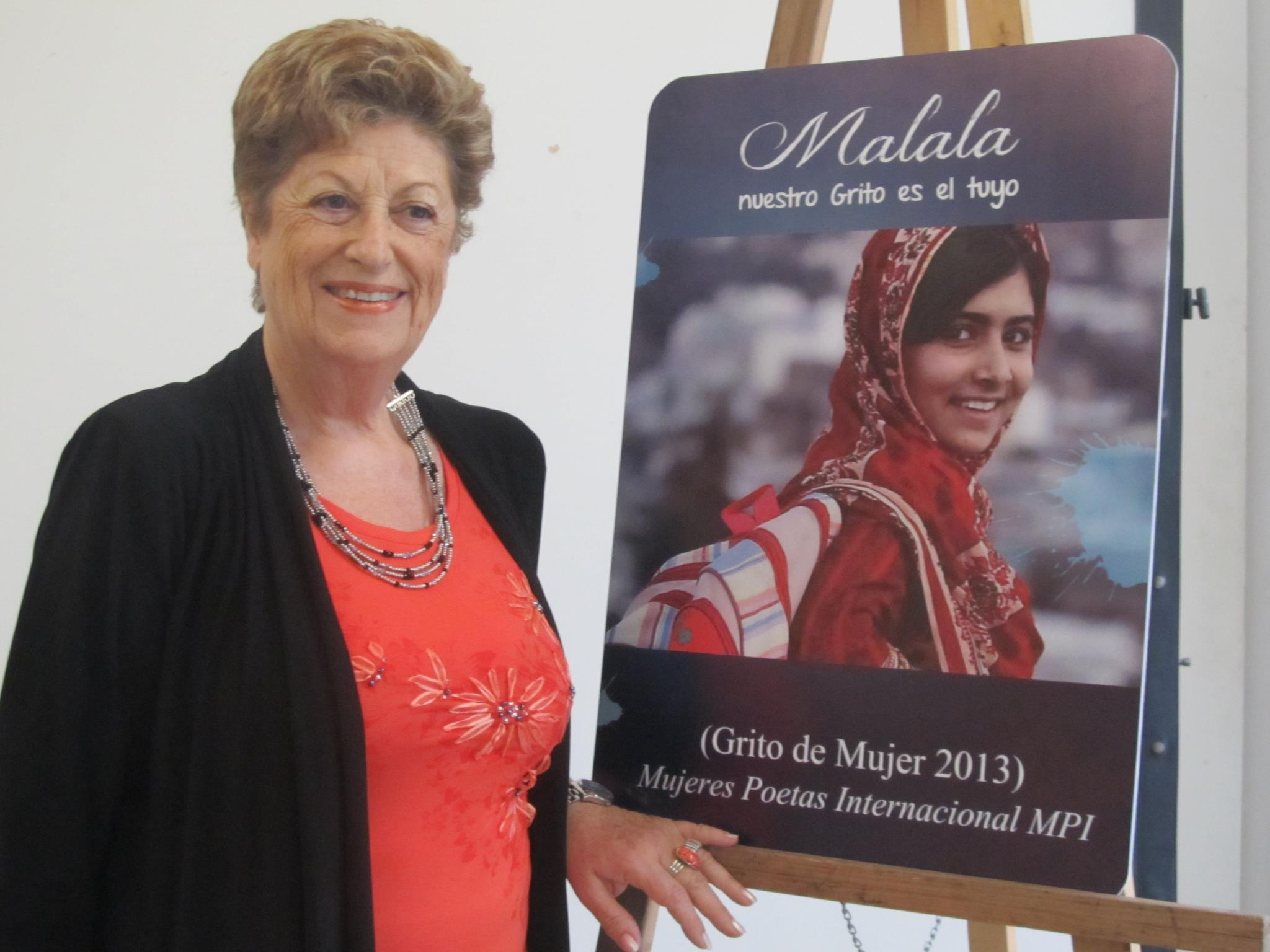
International Poetry Festival 2013 in Argentina, to honour Yousafzai

=== 2010s ===
Yousafzai's memoir I Am Malala: The Story of the Girl Who Stood Up for Education and Was Shot by the Taliban, co-written with British journalist Christina Lamb, was published in October 2013 by Little, Brown and Company in the US and by Weidenfeld & Nicolson in the UK. Fatima Bhutto, reviewing the book for The Guardian called the book "fearless" and stated that "the haters and conspiracy theorists would do well to read this book", though she criticised "the stiff, know-it-all voice of a foreign correspondent" that is interwoven with Yousafzai's.

Marie Arana for The Washington Post called the book "riveting" and wrote "It is difficult to imagine a chronicle of a war more moving, apart from perhaps the diary of Anne Frank." Tina Jordan in Entertainment Weekly gave the book a "B+", writing "Malala's bravely eager voice can seem a little thin here, in I Am Malala, likely thanks to her co-writer, but her powerful message remains undiluted."

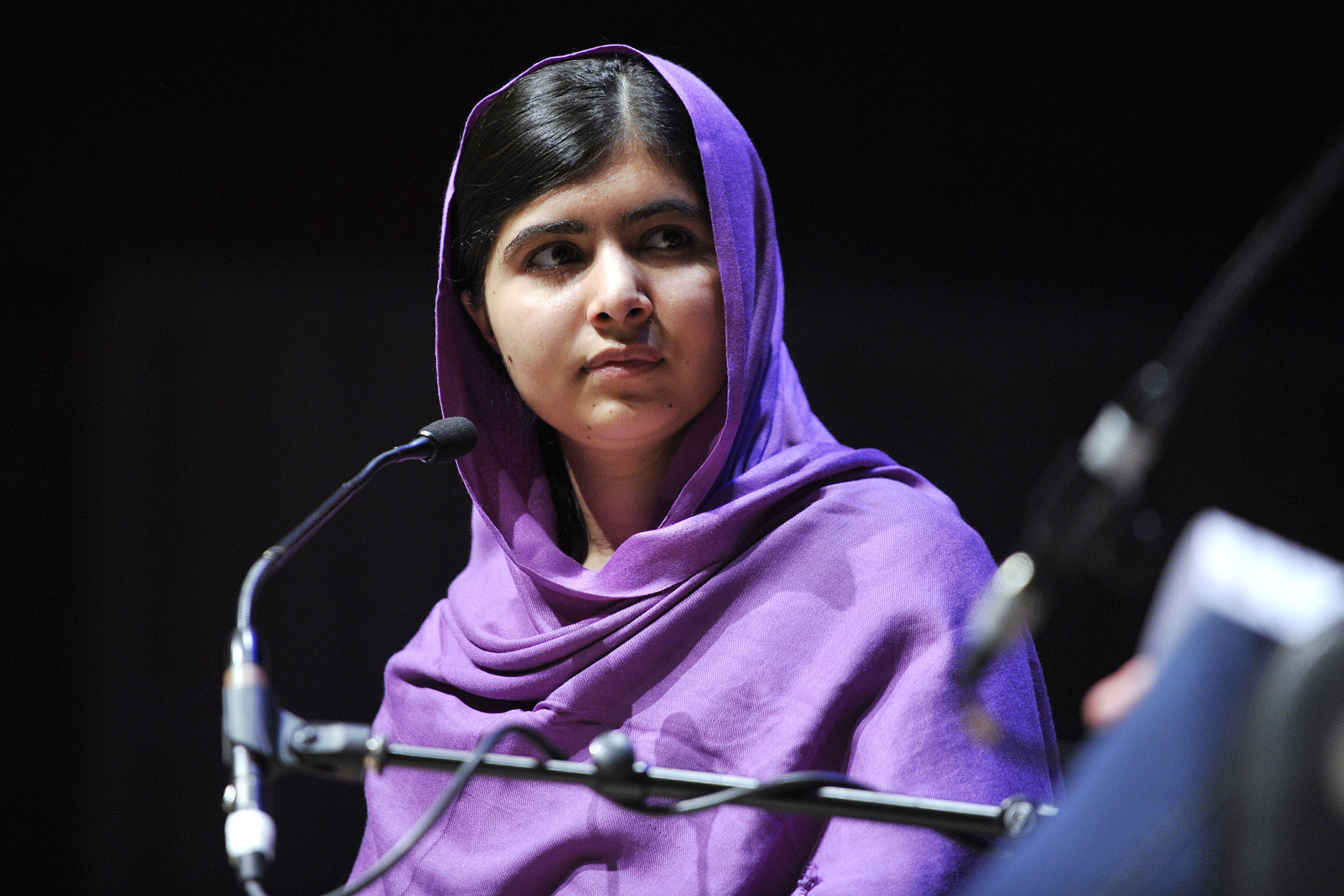
Yousafzai at Women of the World Festival, 2014

A children's edition of the memoir was published in 2014 under the title I Am Malala: How One Girl Stood Up for Education and Changed the World. According to Publishers Weekly, in 2017 the book had sold almost 2 million copies, and there were 750,000 copies of the children's edition in print.

Yousafzai was the subject of the 2015 documentary He Named Me Malala, which was shortlisted for the Academy Award for Best Documentary Feature. In 2020, an Indian Hindi-language biographical film Gul Makai by H. E. Amjad Khan was released, with Reem Sameer Shaikh portraying her.

Yousafzai authored a picture book, Malala's Magic Pencil, which was illustrated by Kerascoët and published on 17 October 2017. By March 2018, The Bookseller reported that the book had over 5,000 sales in the UK. In a review for The Guardian, Imogen Carter describes the book as "enchanting", opining that it "strikes just the right balance" between "heavy-handed" and "heartfelt", and is a "welcome addition to the frustratingly small range of children's books that feature BAME central characters". Rebecca Gurney of The Daily Californian gives the book a grade of 4.5 out of 5, calling it a "beautiful account of a terrifying but inspiring tale" and commenting "Though the story begins with fantasy, it ends starkly grounded in reality."

In March 2018, it was announced that Yousafzai's next book We Are Displaced: True Stories of Refugee Lives would be published on 4 September 2018 by Little, Brown and Company's Young Readers division. The book is about refugees, and includes stories from Yousafzai's own life along with those of people she has met. Speaking about the book, Yousafzai said that "What tends to get lost in the current refugee crisis is the humanity behind the statistics" and "people become refugees when they have no other option. This is never your first choice." Profits from the book will go to Yousafzai's charity Malala Fund. She visited Australia and criticized its asylum policies and compared immigration policies of the US and Europe unfavourably to those of poor countries and Pakistan. The book was published on 8 January 2019.

=== 2020s ===
On 8 March 2021, a multiyear partnership between Yousafzai and Apple was announced. She will work on programming for Apple's streaming service, Apple TV+. The work will span "dramas, comedies, documentaries, animation, and children's series, and draw on her ability to inspire people around the world."

In October 2025, Yousafzai's second memoir, Finding My Way was published.

== Awards and honours ==
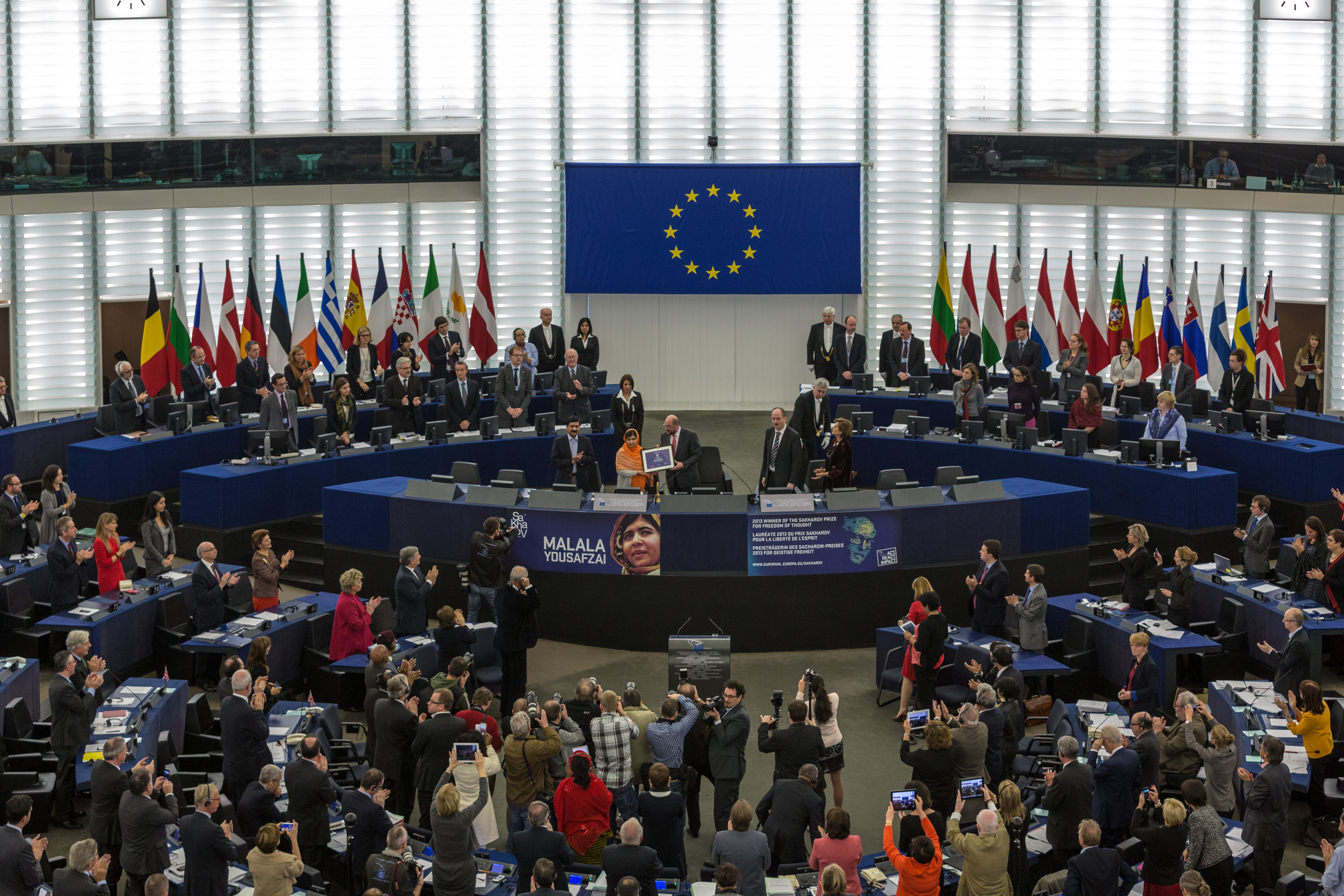
Yousafzai receiving the Sakharov Prize at the European Parliament in November 2013

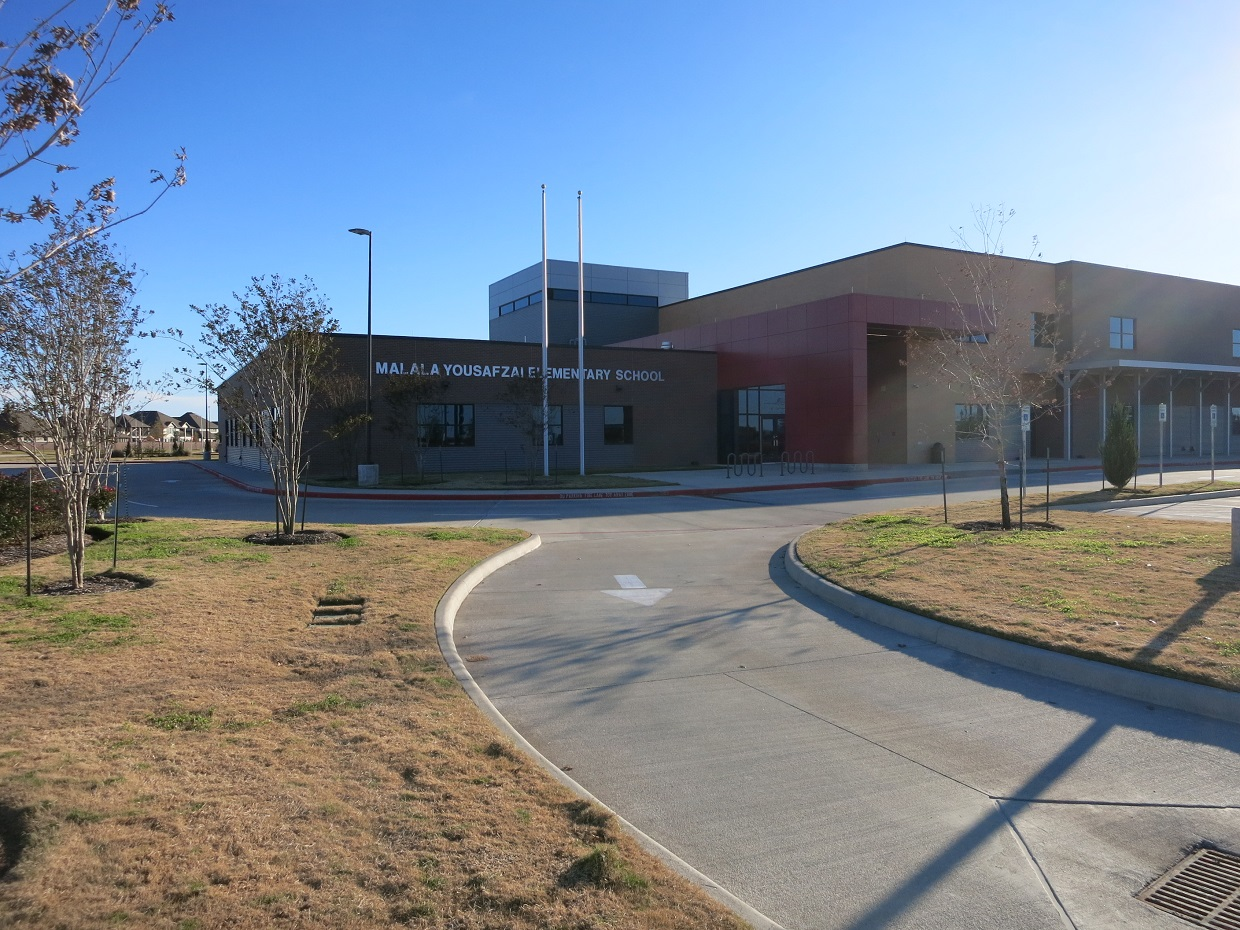
Malala Yousafzai Elementary School in Fort Bend County, Texas

Awards and honours, listed by the date given:

=== 2011 ===
- 2011: International Children's Peace Prize (nominee)
- 2011: National Youth Peace Prize

=== 2012 ===
- January 2012: Anne Frank Award for Moral Courage
- October 2012: Sitara-e-Shujaat, Pakistan's second-highest civilian bravery award
- November 2012: Foreign Policy magazine top 100 global thinker
- December 2012: Time magazine Person of the Year shortlist for 2012
- November 2012: Mother Teresa Awards for Social Justice (Note: Yousafzai's family was denied permission to attend the award ceremony in India by Pakistani authorities over security concerns, so the award was smuggled to her father by British-Pakistani film maker Sevy Ali.)
- December 2012: Rome Prize for Peace and Humanitarian Action

=== 2013 ===
- January 2013: Top Name in Annual Survey of Global English in 2012
- January 2013: Simone de Beauvoir Prize
- March 2013: Memminger Freiheitspreis 1525 (conferred on 7 December 2013 in Oxford)
- March 2013: Doughty Street Advocacy award of Index on Censorship
- March 2013: Fred and Anne Jarvis Award of the UK National Union of Teachers
- April 2013: Vital Voices Global Leadership Awards, Global Trailblazer
- April 2013: One of Time's "100 Most Influential People in the World"
- May 2013: Premi Internacional Catalunya Award of Catalonia, May 2013
- June 2013: Annual Award for Development of the OPEC Fund for International Development (OFID)
- June 2013: International Campaigner of the Year, 2013 Observer Ethical Awards
- August 2013: Tipperary International Peace Award for 2012, Ireland Tipperary Peace Convention
- 2013: Portrait of Yousafzai by Jonathan Yeo displayed at National Portrait Gallery, London
- September 2013: Ambassador of Conscience Award from Amnesty International
- 2013: International Children's Peace Prize
- 2013: Clinton Global Citizen Awards from Clinton Foundation
- September 2013: Harvard Foundation's Peter Gomes Humanitarian Award from Harvard University
- 2013: Anna Politkovskaya Award – Reach All Women in War
- 2013: Reflections of Hope Award – Oklahoma City National Memorial & Museum
- 2013: Sakharov Prize for Freedom of Thought – awarded by the European Parliament
- 2013: Honorary Master of Arts degree awarded by the University of Edinburgh
- 2013: Pride of Britain (October)
- 2013: Glamour magazine Woman of the Year
- 2013: GG2 Hammer Award at GG2 Leadership Awards (November)
- 2013: International Prize for Equality and Non-Discrimination

=== 2014 ===
- 2014: Awarded the World Children's Prize also known as Children's Nobel Prize
- 2014: Awarded Honorary Life Membership by the PSEU (Ireland)
- 2014: Skoll Global Treasure Award
- 2014: Honorary Doctor of Civil Law, University of King's College, Halifax, Nova Scotia, Canada
- 2014: 2014 Nobel Peace Prize, shared with Kailash Satyarthi
- 2014: Philadelphia Liberty Medal
- 2014: Asia Game Changer Award
- 2014: One of Time Magazine "The 25 Most Influential Teens of 2014"
- 2014: Honorary Canadian citizenship

=== 2015 ===
- 2015: Asteroid 316201 Malala named in her honour.
- 2015: The audio version of her book I Am Malala wins Grammy Award for Best Children's Album.

=== 2016 ===
- 2016: Honorary President of The Students' Union of the University of Sheffield
- 2016: Order of the Smile

=== 2017 ===
- 2017: Youngest ever United Nations Messenger of Peace
- 2017: Received honorary doctorate from the University of Ottawa
- 2017: Ellis Island International Medal of Honor
- 2017: Wonk of the Year 2017 from American University
- 2017: Harper's Bazaar inducted Malala in the list of "150 of the most influential female leaders in the UK".

=== 2018 ===
- 2018: Advisor to Princess Zebunisa of Swat, Swat Relief Initiative Foundation, Princeton, New Jersey
- 2018: Gleitsman Award from the Center for the Public Leadership at Harvard Kennedy School

=== 2019 ===
- 2019: For their first match of March 2019, the women of the United States women's national soccer team each wore a jersey with the name of a woman they were honoring, on the back; Carli Lloyd chose the name of Yousafzai.
- 2019: In 2019, Time created 89 new covers to celebrate women of the year starting from 1920; it chose Yousafzai for 2009.

=== 2022 ===
- 2022: Elected World's Children's Prize Decade Child Rights Hero.

== In popular culture ==
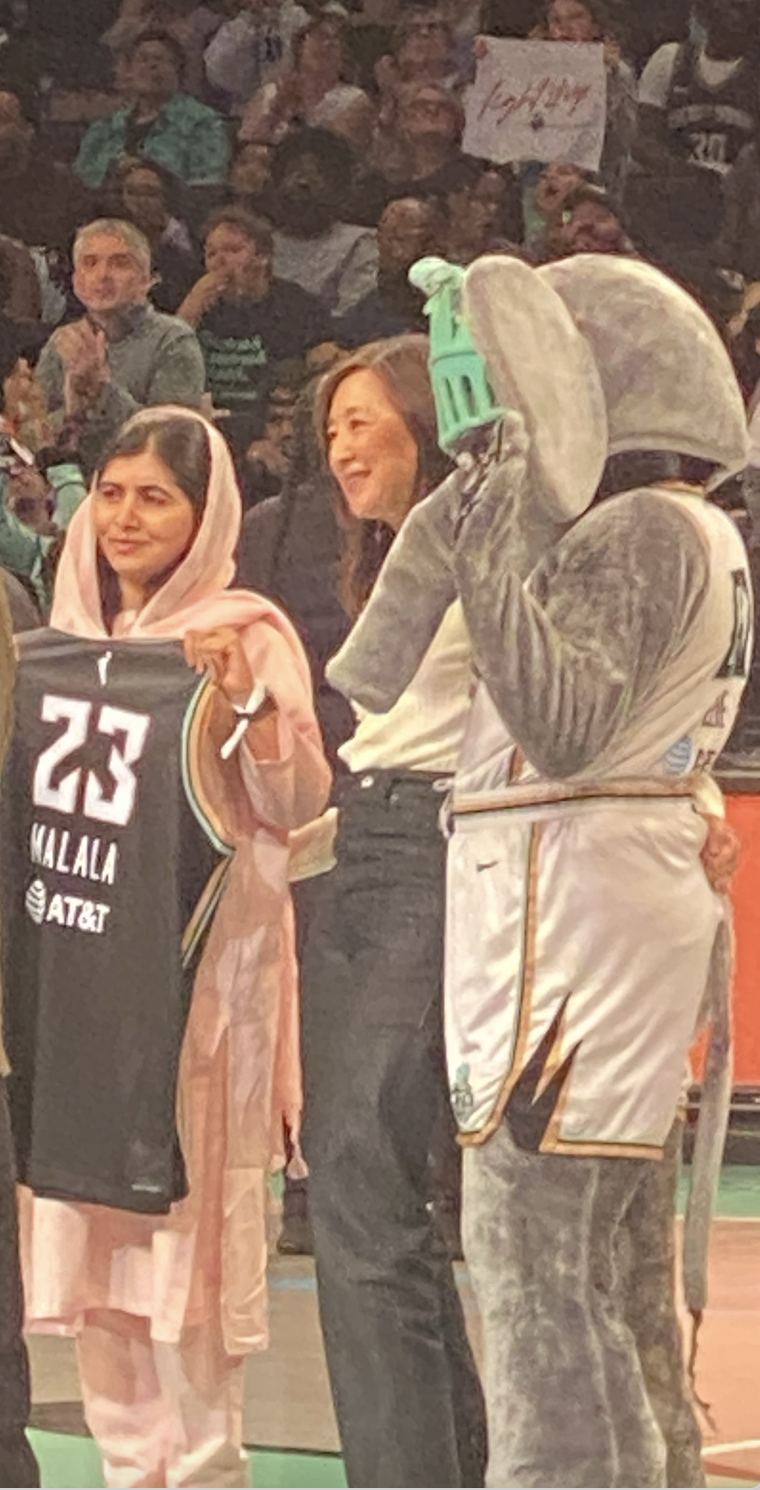
Malala Yousafzai with Clara Wu Tsai and Ellie The Elephant at a New York Liberty game in September 2023

In 2015, during the media tour for a documentary film about her life, Malala performed magic tricks with playing cards on The Late Show with Stephen Colbert.

In the 2016 action comedy film Zoolander 2, Malala Yousafzai is depicted as dating/marrying the "next hot model" Derek Zoolander Jr. (portrayed by Cyrus Arnold), who earlier had been admiring and reading her various autobiographies.

In his 2015 routine, stand-up comedian Joe Lycett included a sketch about Malala as the classmate you can never compete with, especially during Show and Tell; "Okay, anyone else bring anything? Malala, did you bring anything in? This Nobel Peace Prize."

In the 2019 coming-of-age comedy film Booksmart, two main characters Amy and Molly (portrayed by Beanie Feldstein and Kaitlyn Dever), named their code word "Malala", after Yousafzai, and the code means they need the other to do something, no question asked. Yousafzai loved the film and approves the reference.

In the 2023 animated superhero film Spider-Man: Across the Spider-Verse, Sofia Barclay voices Malala Windsor / Spider-UK (Earth-835), described as a composite of Malala Yousafzai and the House of Windsor. A lieutenant of Miguel O'Hara's Spider-Society, Barclay said of the character: "Who better to model a superhero after than a real-life superhero? A woman famous in real life for her integrity and bravery when faced with dangerous odds: yes please!".

The second season of the Channel 4 British sitcom We Are Lady Parts, released in May 2024, contained an episode titled and inspired by Yousafzai, "Malala Made Me Do It". It featured Malala in her debut acting role.

== See also ==
- Aitzaz Hasan – Pakistani student and heroic figure
- Bibi Aisha – Afghan woman
- British Pakistanis – Citizens of the United Kingdom whose ancestral roots lie in Pakistan
- Farida Afridi – Women's rights activist
- Humaira Bachal – Pakistani female education advocate
- List of peace activists
- Muzoon Almellehan – Syrian activist and refugee resettled
- Sahar Gul – Afghan teenager
- Shenila Khoja-Moolji – Pakistani-American academic
- Women's education in Pakistan
- Women's rights in 2014
- Women's rights in Pakistan
