= Helga Brauer =

East German singer

Helga Brauer (2 May 1936 – 15 June 1991) was a Schlager singer of the GDR.

== Life ==
Brauer was born on 2 May 1936 in Leipzig. After training as a dental technician, Helga Brauer was helped by chance to begin her singing career in the summer of 1954: During a vacation in Sellin on the island of Rügen, she took part in a singing competition with the orchestra Helmut Opel. She won first prize - and Opel immediately offered the 18-year-old a contract as an accompanist for the orchestra.

On 11 November 1954, Helga Brauer gave her first public performance in Leipzig's Messehalle 2, followed by further appearances and guest performances with the Helmut Opel Orchestra, including in Switzerland. In March 1956, she passed a "microphone audition" with GDR Radio and shortly afterwards appeared for the first time with the Rundfunk-Tanzorchester Leipzig (Leipzig Radio Dance Orchestra), then under the direction of Kurt Henkels. The first radio recordings followed in the same year, and the record company Amiga also offered a six-month training contract in the summer of 1956. This was followed in 1957 by an exclusive contract and the recording of the first single.

One year later, Helga Brauer scored the first number one hit in the GDR pop rankings with Heute spielt der Konstantin Klavier. In 1959, together with her band "Die Flamingos", she was chosen to popularize the fashionable dance Lipsi with Heute tanzen alle jungen Leute, and for Mister Brown aus USA - also a Lipsi - she received Die goldene Note at the dance music festival of the same name in the same year.

In 1960, Helga Brauer married the composer, arranger and trumpeter Walter Eichenberg, who took over the direction of the Leipzig Radio Dance Orchestra in 1961 and also wrote numerous successful titles for the singer such as Hör' mein Herz, Das Tagebuch vom schönen Max, Mit dem strahlendsten Lächeln der Welt and Einer ist für den andern da.

Tours abroad in the 1960s took Helga Brauer to the Soviet Union, the Czechoslovakia, Hungary, Austria, Sweden, Finland and Egypt. With Schlaf, mein kleiner Johnny she won the first Schlagerwettbewerb der DDR in 1966. In the 70s and 80s, the singer was not only a guest on the big entertainment shows on GDR television such as Amiga-Cocktail, Ein Kessel Buntes or Da liegt Musike drin, but also on numerous stages. Her repertoire included over 600 titles.

Helga Brauer died in Leipzig of breast cancer at the age of 55 and was buried in the Südfriedhof in her home town. In 2018, her husband Walter, who died on 13 March, was laid to rest with her.

In 2014 a rose was registered in memory of Helga Brauer. 'Helga Brauer' is a hybrid of two old European shrub roses. ( see https://www.helpmefind.com/gardening/l.php?l=2.70764)

== Discography ==
- 1965 - LP Helga sings for you and me (Amiga)
- 1986 - LP Helga Brauer - Das musikalische Porträt (Amiga)
- 1999 - CD Hör mein Herz. Helga Brauer - Her greatest successes (Aelstertal)
- 2015 - CD The music of our generation. Helga Brauer - Die größten Hits (Sony Music/ Amiga)
- over 50 singles and EPs

== Filmography ==
- 1962: Revue um Mitternacht

== Literature ==
- Bernd Meyer-Rähnitz, Frank Oehme, Joachim Schütte: Die "Ewige Freundin" – Eterna und Amiga; Die Discographie der Schellackplatten (1947-1961), Albis International Bibliophilen-Verlag, Dresden–Ústí nad Labem 2006, ISBN 80-86971-10-4
- Kurzbiografie zu: Brauer, Helga. In: Wer war wer in der DDR? 5. AusgabeBand 1. Ch. Links, Berlin 2010, ISBN 978-3-86153-561-4.
