= Adam B. Ellick =

Journalist

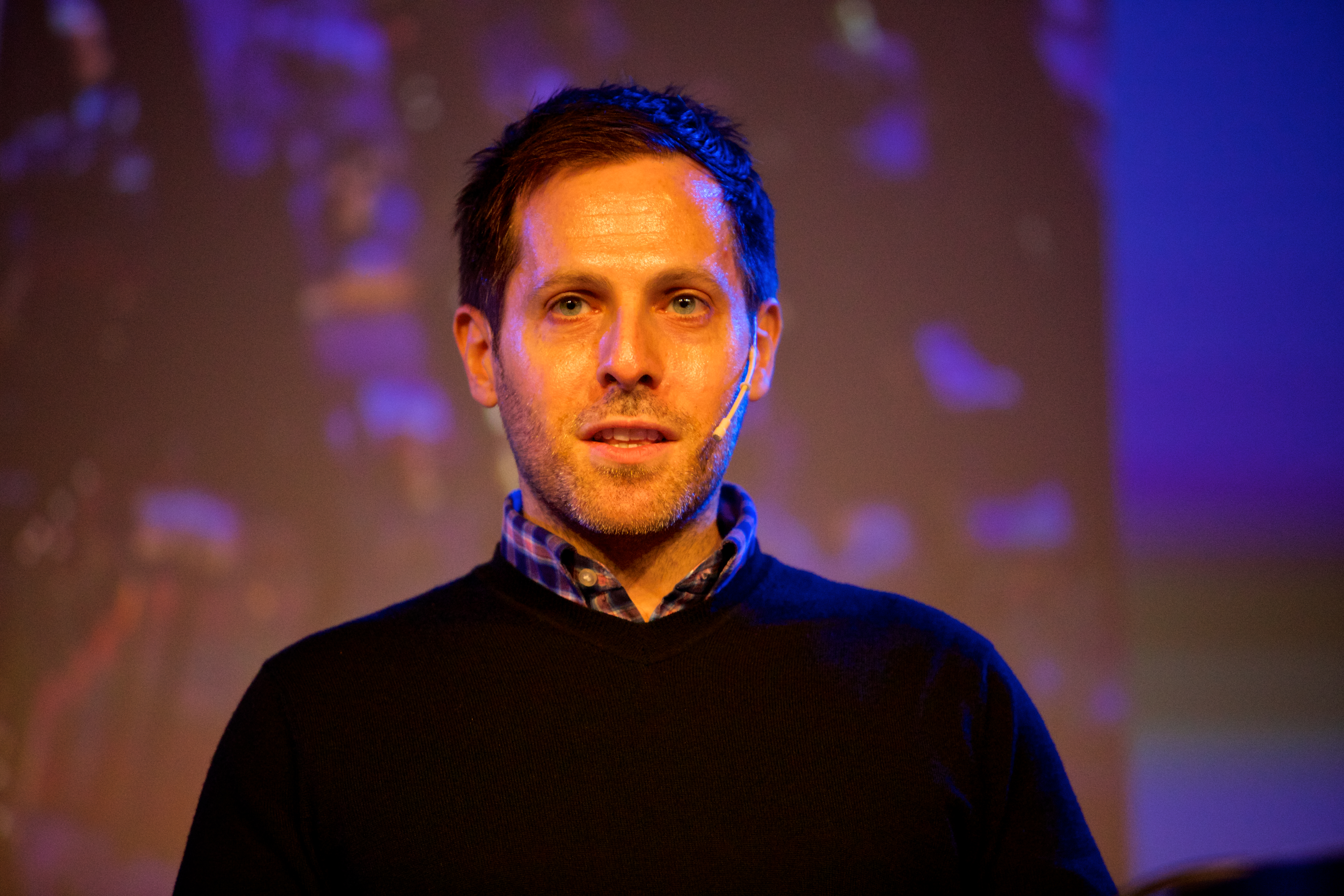
- Education: Ithaca College (with honors); Harvard Kennedy School (MPA)
- Known for: Journalism
- Awards: Webby Award Winner (2009) The New York Times Publisher's Award (2009) Fulbright Scholars Grantee (2003-2004)

Adam B. Ellick is a correspondent for The New York Times.

In the summer of 2009, Ellick filmed a documentary about Malala Yousafzai. In 2011, he was part of the team with New York Times that won a Pulitzer Prize for the "best use of video category" for his coverage inside the everyday lives of Pakistanis.
