= Milwaukee Brewers (disambiguation) =

The Milwaukee Brewers are a Major League Baseball team based in Milwaukee, Wisconsin, U.S., since 1970.

Milwaukee Brewers may also refer to the following historical American professional baseball teams:

- Milwaukee Brewers (1884–1885), a minor-league team that competed for part of the 1884 season in the major-league Union Association
- Milwaukee Brewers (1886–1892), a minor-league team that competed for part of the 1891 season in the major-league American Association
- Milwaukee Brewers (1894–1901), a team that competed in the minor leagues during 1894–1900, then the major-league American League in 1901
- Milwaukee Brewers (1902–1952), a minor-league team that competed in the American Association from 1902 to 1952

== See also ==
- Beer in Milwaukee
