= Zebunisa Jilani =

Pakistani American entrepreneur

- Years active: 2009–present
- Born: 1952 (age 73–74); Saidu Sharif, Swat
- Residence: New Jersey, US
- Spouse: Arshad Jilani
- Occupation: Social entrepreneur, businessperson

Zebunisa Jilani (Urdu: زيب انيسا جيلاني), also known as Zebu Jilani, is a Pakistani American social entrepreneur, nutritionist and the founder, chair and president of the Swat Relief Initiative (SRI) foundation. She is a social philanthropist and change maker who works as a volunteer for her organization, which improves the lives of women and children. Based in the United States, Jilani is committed to working for underprivileged women and children in Swat. Swat Relief Initiative also seeks to empower and develop communities through social mobilization and awareness programs to help them achieve a better quality of life.

== Early life ==
Zebunisa Jilani is the granddaughter of Miangul Jahan Zeb (the last royal ruler of Swat), who ruled from 1949 to 1969 and was internationally renowned as a pioneer in rural development in Pakistan. The Wāli of Swat established hundreds of schools, hospitals and clinics as well as modern roads and communication systems, unparalleled in South Asia. Zebunisa continues her grandfathers legacy through her non-profit, Swat Relief Initiative.

She was born in 1952 at Saidu Sharif in Swat. At age 25, she married Arshad Jilani, the son of Major General Mian Ghulam Jilani. Arshad Jilani is a graduate of the Massachusetts Institute of Technology and worked for General Electric for 37 years. Zebunisa got her high school degree from The Convent of Jesus and Mary, Murree northeast of Islamabad. Her further education while living in China was in dietetics, preventive medicine, acupressure and Traditional Chinese Medicine. She earned a degree in nutrition in 2005 from Cuyahoga Community College in Ohio.

She has created a comprehensive Health and Nutrition Seminar to help women and children in Rural Swat take concrete steps to improve their health and prevent disease. She is also on the board of SWAaT and the advisory board of Read and Prosper.

The family is settled near Princeton, New Jersey, USA.

== Work ==
When a massive human displacement from Swat took place in the first half of 2009, following a large scale military confrontation between the Pakistani military and the Taliban, Jilani founded the Swat Relief Initiative to assist the Swati population in refugee camps. She went to Pakistan in March 2009 to help the internally displaced persons. She and her husband spend each spring in Pakistan as volunteer workers. They spend the rest of the year in North America and Europe for outreach and fundraising.

== See also ==
- Miangul Jahan Zeb
- Mussarat Ahmed Zeb
- Miangul Adnan Aurangzeb

== Sources ==
- UAE National: War calls back princess to a long ago homeland
- Washington Post:2015/05/08: The Taliban once ruled Pakistan's Swat Valley now peace has returned
