= Justice Brewer (disambiguation) =

David Josiah Brewer (1837–1910), was an associate justice of the Supreme Court of the United States. Justice Brewer may also refer to:

- David V. Brewer (born 1951), associate justice of the Oregon Supreme Court
- William Brewer (justice) (died 1226), British judge and Baron of the Exchequer
