= Swat Relief Initiative =

American charity aiding residents of Swat, Pakistan

Swat Relief Initiative is an American federally registered 501(c)(3) charitable organization which raises funds for and provides direct volunteer assistance to schools and clinics in Swat, Pakistan. The foundation is based in Princeton, New Jersey, and was founded by Pakistani American Zebunisa Jilani in 2010. Zebunisa Jilani is the granddaughter of His Highness Miangul Jahan Zeb who ruled the Khyber Pakhtunkhwa districts of Buner, Shangla and Swat, Pakistan, comprising Swat (princely state) as Wali Jahan Zeb of Swat from December 1949 until September 1969. During the Wali's administration he was personally involved in the establishment of hundreds of schools and clinics.

Zebunisa Jilani is assisting in running those schools in Swat sponsored by the organization and water schemes in the far-flung areas of Swat Valley. Among its past interns is the Nobel Prize winning social activist Malala Yousafzai.
