= Marco Brouwers =

Dutch volleyball player (born 1958)

Personal information
- Nationality: Dutch
- Born: 10 March 1958 (age 67); Amsterdam, Netherlands

Sport
- Sport: Volleyball

Marco Brouwers (born 10 March 1958) is a Dutch volleyball player. He competed in the men's tournament at the 1988 Summer Olympics.
