= Philippe De Brouwer =

Belgian banker and academic

Philippe J.S. De Brouwer
- Born: 21 February 1969 (age 57); Leuven, Belgium

Academic background
- Education: Vrije Universiteit Brussel, (PhD)

Academic work
- Discipline: Investment Management and Financial risk management
- School or tradition: Vrije Universiteit Brussel
- Institutions: University of Warsaw; Vlerick Business School
- Notable ideas: Maslowian Portfolio Theory solution to the Fallacy of Large Numbers

Philippe J.S. De Brouwer (born 21 February 1969) is a European investment and banking professional as well as academician in finance and investing. As a scientist he is mostly known for his solution to the Fallacy of Large Numbers (formulated by Paul A Samuelson in 1963) and his formulation of the Maslowian Portfolio Theory in the field of investment advice (and annex theory Target Oriented Investment Advice).

He worked mainly in Belgium, Ireland and Poland, where he currently lives. He is associated to the University of Warsaw and has a collaboration with the Vlerick Business School, while working in risk management for a large banking corporation.

== Theories and other notable publications ==
=== The solution to the Fallacy of Large Numbers (2001) ===
The Fallacy of Large Numbers as formulated by Paul A. Samuelson in 1963. This is a very important and fundamental paradox in investment advice. Indeed, financial advisers typically advice risky investments for longer time horizons. So that if one for example has an investment horizon of one year typically only cash and cash-like assets are advised. Shares (that are much more risky) are typically advised if the investment horizon is longer (depending on the country culture this is between 3 and 15 years). This seems to make sense, if one has 10K and wants to buy something of 10K on short term, investing in equities is risky as it would not be uncommon to lose 10% on such portfolio on a horizon of one year. The last few hundred years of capitalist history learns us that on longer horizons the probability that equities have a negative return is much lower. Therefore investment advisers will not advice equities on one year but on ten year it might be acceptable. This paradigm is fundamental to all investment advice, but in 1963 Samuelson wrote a short paper arguing that it is not rational to compound a mistake or in other words that "unfairness can only breed unfairness", meaning that it is not rational to accept a series of bets when one would not accept one of the atomic bets (if one is a utility optimizer).

This paradox was an important problem for every investor, investment advisor and academic that took his responsibility serious. The question if the rule of thumb that every advisor was using was a good one or not was open. Philippe De Brouwer published solved this puzzle and published a simple solution in 2001.

The counter-example was based on an asymmetrical utility function. To some extent it can be argued that the utility function used by De Brouwer and Van den Spiegel was a simplified version of what Harry Markowitz describes in his 1952 paper "The Utility of Wealth". The utility function has a kink in the actual wealth and decreases faster for losses than it increases for profits. It seems that with such utility function it is actually natural to "accept a series of bets while one should be rejected". More profoundly this seems to be the natural shape for the utility function of a loss averse investor. Adding this to the fact that all investors are loss averse, this result is to be considered as an important step in responsible investment advice.

=== Maslowian Portfolio Theory (2009 and 2011) ===
Once the Fallacy of Large Numbers falsified, Philippe De Brouwer could further investigate investment advice and try to come up with a coherent framework for investment advice. Till then the only available theory was Markowitz "Mean Variance theory". The model is a simply MCDA (Multiple-criteria decision analysis heuristic). The idea is that selecting the optimal asset mix (aka "portfolio") one needs to optimize two functions: minimize "risk" and maximize "expected return". Because there will be no portfolios that has both the highest expected return and the lowest risk there is not one but rather an infinite set of "solutions" (not dominated solutions, mostly referred to as the "efficient frontier"). This means that there needs to be another principle to select one. Typically one uses a quadratic utility function $U = U(\sigma,R)$, usually simplified to $U = R - \lambda \sigma^2$. While theoretically appealing for its consistency and logical coherence, in practice it is not easy to estimate the parameter $\lambda$. This is, according to Prof. De Brouwer because (a) volatility is not even a risk measure, (b) the utility function is wrong and (c) the concept of one utility function (as opposed to one per investment project) does not even exist. Therefore, practitioners do not use this utility function at all but simply try to determine a "risk profile", which should be something as the "desired $\sigma$ for that investor". This non-existent concept is the determined with the most primitive MCDA method, the Weighted sum model.(see and

Taking a step back one will notice that the approach as presented in the mean variance theory is ignoring life-goals and hence can make sense for investors that are so rich that they never have to worry about subsistence and hence can consider money as the only life-goal. De Brouwer proposes to start from human needs. As a starting point he uses Maslow's hierarchy of needs, but he recognizes many critics and criticisms but concludes that what they all have in common is that human needs are separate mental accounts (are independent and each of them has is important if not fulfilled). This observation becomes the key to Maslowian Portfolio Theory, which might be summarized as "investors who save to fulfil non-monetary life-goals should use a separate portfolio for each investment goal". These portfolios should be optimized with a coherent risk measure taking into account the parameters from that goal (such as acceptable risk level, investment horizon, savings pattern, usage pattern). De Brouwer develops a theory "Target Oriented Investment Advice" that provides the mathematical framework. necessary to put this theory into practice.

=== The Big R-Book: from data science to learning machines and big data ===
This opus magnus covers data science using the software R Homepage of the book:

The book is a story about data, and how to use it successfully in a private company. The book aims at increasing your personal brand and value, as well as shareholder value.

=== Other contributions ===
Noteworthy is De Brouwer's effort to make help practitioners understand the concept and importance of coherent risk measure (see eg.) and his contributions to apply theory into practice via risk management in financial institutions (see eg.)

== Practitioner in banking and investments ==
Prof. De Brouwer worked for Deutsche Bank, P&V Assurances, Fortis, KBC Bank, Royal Bank of Scotland and HSBC

He became CEO of Warta TFI and Warta Asset Management in 2004 (see, and)

Other offices held or holding:

- Philippe De Brouwer is member of the supervisory board of the AGH University of Krakow
- Member of the Patronage Council of The Economic University of Krakow

== Honorary consul for Belgium with bailiwick Malopolskie and Podkarpacie ==
On 27 April 2017 the honorary consulate of Belgium was re-opened with Philippe De Brouwer as honorary consul. Honorary consuls of Belgium are entrusted with the fiduciary care of wellbeing of Belgian nationals abroad and can be a first contact point in case with travel related or other problems.
