= Dirk Brouwer (architect) =

Dutch architect (1899–1941)

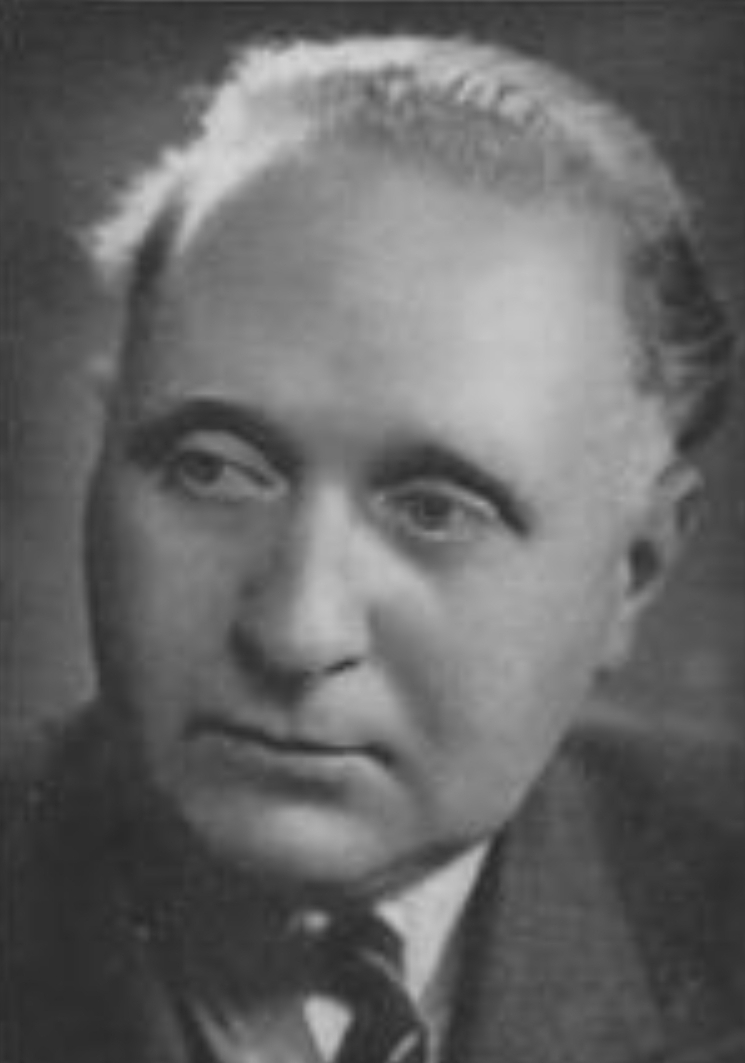
D. Brouwer

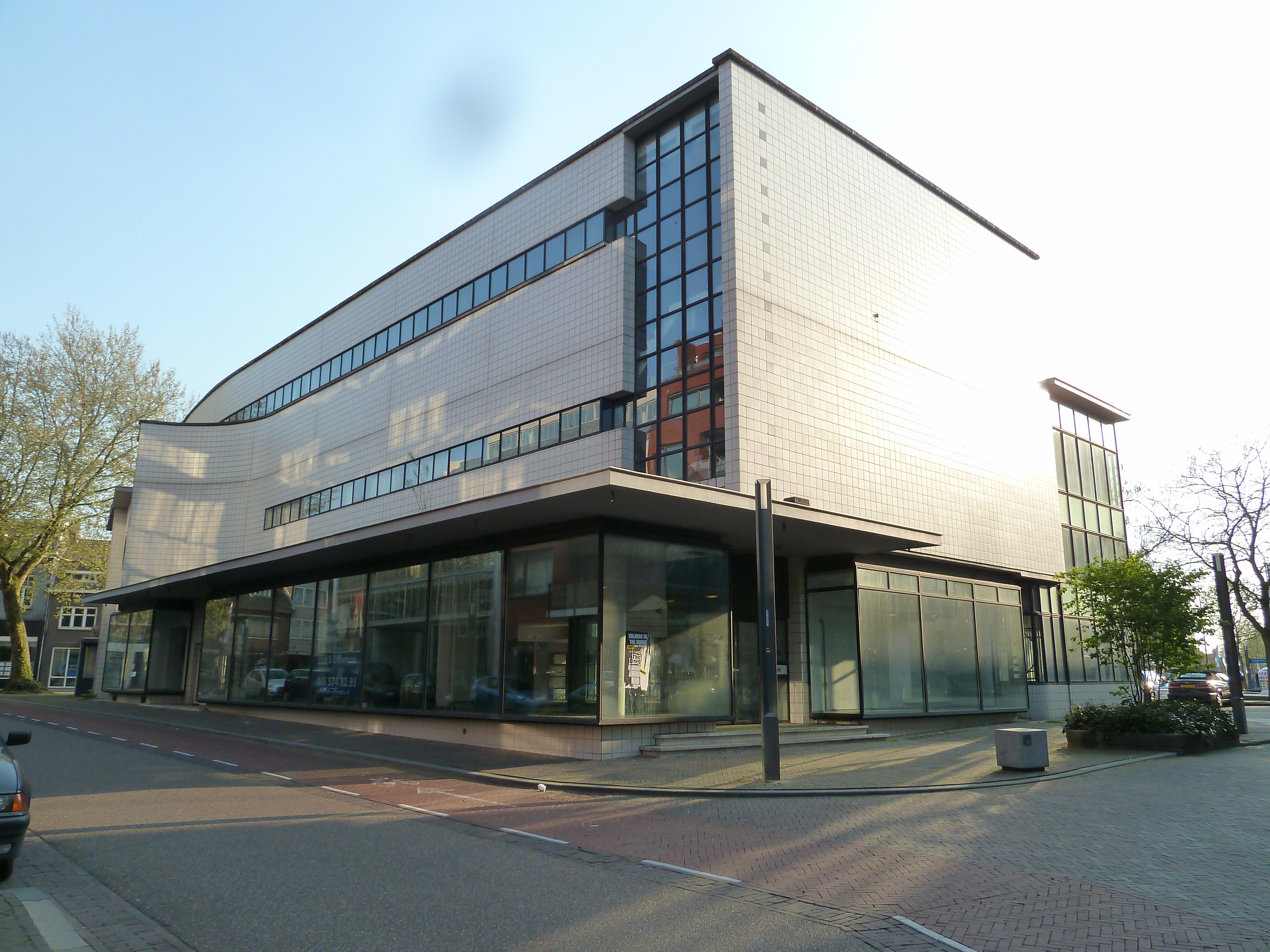
Former HEMA store, Heerlen (1939)

Dirk Brouwer (Dutch pronunciation: [ˈdɪr(ə)ɡ ˈbrʌu.ər]; 23 November 1899 in Alkmaar – 17 November 1941 in Overveen) was a Dutch architect. His father was a concierge at a local technical school.

After three years of studies Dirk Brouwer learned from various architects and attended a course for Higher Architectural Education in Amsterdam.

His buildings were designed according to the Amsterdam School and he cooperated with Willem Marinus Dudok, a notable assertor of Modernism, thus Brouwer's style was influenced. In 1938 he designed the backside and possibly also the dome light of the Bijenkorf department store in Amsterdam. He also built the HEMA store in Heerlen.

In World War II he joined the resistance and the editors of the illegal magazine Vrij Nederland. He was therefore executed by German troops in the dunes near Overveen in 1941.
