= Lipsi (dance) =

The Lipsi is a dance created in East Germany as a communist alternative to decadent Western rock and roll-influenced dancing. Specifically, the group dancing was seen as less sexual than partner dance, where the female follows the male's lead.

The Lipsi was created in 1959. It was poorly received by youth, with protests beginning in summer 1959 that mocked Walter Ulbricht and supported Elvis Presley.

David Byrne described Lipsi as "a weird sexless popular dance ... that the government attempted to insert into popular culture as a kind of immunization against Elvis’s rock-and-roll gyrations."

== See also ==
- Rock and roll and the fall of communism
