= Sládek =

Sládek (feminine: Sládková) is a Czech surname meaning a maltster. Notable people with the surname include:

- Bohumil Sládek, Czech sprint canoer
- Hana Sládková-Koželuhová (born 1928), Czech tennis player
- Jan Sládek (1907–1984), Czech gymnast
- John Sladek (1937–2000), American science fiction author
- Josef Václav Sládek (1845–1912), Czech writer
- Michael Sladek (1946–2024), German doctor, husband of Ursula
- Miroslav Sládek (born 1950), Czech politician
  - Republicans of Miroslav Sládek, Czech political party
- Pavel Sládek (born 1971), Czechoslovak biathlete
- Peter Sládek (born 1989), Slovak footballer
- Ursula Sladek (born 1946), German renewable energy activist, wife of Michael

== See also ==
- Sladký
