= Brawer =

Brawer is a surname. Notable people with the surname include:

- Dina Brawer, first Orthodox woman rabbi in the United Kingdom
- Mara Brawer (born 1962), Argentine psychologist and politician
- Moshe Brawer (1919–2020), Israeli geographer

== See also ==
- Brewer (surname)
