= Brewer (surname) =

Brewer is a surname of English origin, meaning a person who brews beer. It has an alternative derivation from the old French bruière meaning "heath", either via Bruyère in Calvados or from residence at a heath in England. Notable people with the surname include:

- A. Max Brewer (1923–1966), American politician
- Aaron Brewer, several people
- Aida Brewer (born 1955), American public official
- Alan West Brewer (1915–2007), Canadian-English physicist and climatologist.
- Albert Brewer (1928–2017), American politician, Governor of Alabama 1968–71
- Alex Brewer, several people
- Alexander Brewer (1906–1984), English cricketer and soldier
- Alison Brewer, American ice hockey player
- Allison Brewer (born 1954), Canadian social activist and politician
- Andrew Brewer (born 1986), Canadian ice hockey coach
- Annie Brewer (1874–1921), British nurse
- Anthony Brewer, several people
- Ashleigh Brewer (born 1990), Australian actress
- Ashley Brewer (born 1991), American sports anchor and journalist
- Ashley Maynard-Brewer (born 1999), Australian soccer player
- The Brewer twins (Derek and Keith, born 1973), American models
- Bert Brewer (1876–1946), British boxer
- Bessie Marsh Brewer (1884–1952), Canadian-American printmaker, painter, sculptor and teacher
- Betty Brewer (Virginia Luella Brewer, c.1920s–2006), American actress
- Bill Brewer, British philosopher
- Billy Brewer (1934–2018), American football coach
- Billy Brewer (died 1914), English professional footballer
- Brandon Brewer (born 1984), Canadian boxer
- Brittany Brewer (born 1997), American basketball player
- Brooke Brewer (1894–1970), American athlete
- Bryan Brewer, president of the Oglala Sioux Tribe 2012–2014
- Cameron Brewer (born 1973), New Zealand politician
- Carl Brewer (ice hockey) (1938–2001), Canadian ice hockey player
- Carl Brewer (politician) (1957–2020), American politician, former mayor of Wichita, Kansas
- Carlos Brewer (1890–1976), United States Army general
- Carmelite Brewer Christie (1852–1931), American missionary
- Carol Brewer, American politician
- Caroline Brewer (born 1962), British field hockey player
- Carson Brewer (1920–2003), American journalist
- Catherine Brewer Benson (1822–1908), American pioneer of women's higher education
- Chandler Brewer (born 1997), American football player
- Charles Brewer, several people including:
  - Charles Brewer (businessman) (born 1958), American entrepreneur
- Charley Brewer, several people
- Charlotte Brewer (born 1956), British literary academic
- Chester Brewer (1875–1953), American college sports coach
- Chet Brewer (1907–1990), American baseball player
- Chloe Brewer (born 2002). English cricketer
- Chris Brewer (born 1962), American football player
- Chris Brewer (poker player) (born 1993), American poker player
- Christine Brewer (born 1955), American opera singer
- C. J. Brewer (disambiguation), multiple people
- Colten Brewer (born 1992), American baseball player
- Conan Brewer (born 1982), Zimbabwean cricketer
- Contessa Brewer (born 1974), American television journalist
- Corey Brewer (born 1986), American basketball player
- Corey Brewer (basketball, born 1975) (born 1975), American basketball player
- Craig Brewer (born 1971), American film director
- Cynthia Brewer (born 1960), American geographer
- D'Angelo Brewer (born 1996), American football player
- David Brewer (disambiguation), several people
- Darnell Brewer, American politician
- Denise Brewer (born 1966), American politician
- Derek Brewer (1923–2008), Welsh medievalist
- Derek Brewer (cricket administrator) (born 1958), British sports administrator
- Dewell Brewer (born 1970), American football player
- Doc Brewer, American racing driver
- Don Brewer (born 1948), American drummer
- Douglas Brewer (1925–2018), Welsh experimental physicist
- Drake Brewer, ring name of Joe Doering (born 1982), American wrestler
- E. Cobham Brewer (1810–1897), compiler of Brewer's Dictionary of Phrase and Fable
- Earl L. Brewer (1869–1942), American politician, Governor of Mississippi 1912–1916
- Eddie Brewer (1919–2003), British conservationist
- Elisabeth Brewer, American nurse and loyalist
- Eric Brewer (ice hockey) (born 1979), Canadian ice hockey player
- Eric Brewer (scientist), American scientist
- Evan Brewer (born 1981), American musician
- Francis B. Brewer (1820–1892), American physician and politician
- Frederick Mason Brewer (1903–1963), English inorganic chemist
- Gage Brewer (1904–1985), American musician
- Gail Brewer-Giorgio (1939–2025), American author
- Gale Brewer (born 1951), American politician
- Gardner Brewer (1806–1874), American merchant
- Gary Brewer, American singer-songwriter, guitarist and banjoist
- Gary Brewer (politician), American politician
- Gay Brewer (1932–2007), American golfer
- G. C. Brewer (1884–1956), American leader of the Churches of Christ
- Gene Brewer (born 1937), American science fiction author
- George Brewer, several people including:
  - George Keefer Brewer (1914–1959), American actor (George Reeves)
- Gil Brewer (1922–1983), American novelist
- Gordon Brewer, Scottish journalist and broadcaster
- Grady Brewer (born 1970), American boxer
- Graeme Brewer (born 1958), Australian swimmer
- Gregory Brewer (born 1951), American Episcopal bishop
- Griffith Brewer (1867–1948), British aviator
- Gunter Brewer (born 1964), American football coach
- Gurley Brewer (1866–1919), American attorney, publisher, and political activist
- Guy Brewer (1904–1978), American politician
- Hannah Brewer (born 1993), Australian soccer player
- Harper Brewer Jr. (born 1937), American politician
- Heather Brewer-Segal (1931–2006), Bermudian-South African tennis player
- Heinrich Brewer (1640–c.1713), German priest and historian
- Henry William Brewer (1836–1903), British illustrator
- Henry Charles Brewer (1866–1950), his son, British painter
- Herbert Brewer (1865–1928), British composer
- Holly Brewer (born 1964), legal historian
- Ian Brewer (1936–2010), Australian rules footballer
- Jack Brewer (disambiguation), several people
- Jake Brewer (1981–2015), American political activist
- Jamie Brewer, American actress and model
- Jamison Brewer (born 1980), American basketball player
- Jan Brewer (born 1944), Governor of Arizona, 2009–15
- Jane Brewer (1924–2017), mayor of Cambridge, Ontario
- James Brewer (disambiguation), several people including:
  - Jim Brewer (baseball) (1937–1987), American baseball player
- Jeaffreson Vennor Brewer (1853–1924), English rugby union player
- Jehoiada Brewer (1752?–1817), Welsh dissenting minister
- Johanna Brewer, American software developer and academic ethnographer
- John Brewer, several people including:
  - John Sherren Brewer (1810–1879), English historian
- Johnny Brewer (1937–2011), American football player
- Jon Brewer (born 1950), English film director
- Jonathan Brewer (born 1987), American football coach
- Jordan Brewer (born 1997), American baseball player
- Josiah Brewer (1796–1872), American minister and author
- Joyce Brewer (1915–2011), Australian cricketer
- Jude Brewer (born 1985), American writer, actor, and producer
- Judith Livers Brewer (born c.1949), American firefighter
- Judson A. Brewer (born 1974), American psychiatrist, neuroscientist and author
- Julia Hartley-Brewer (born 1968), British journalist
- Katie Eyre Brewer, American politician
- Ken Brewer (1941–2006), American poet
- Kidd Brewer (1908–1991), American football player, coach and administrator
- Leigh Brewer (1933–2013), New Zealand dancer and choreographer
- Leigh Richmond Brewer (1839–1916), American Episcopal bishop
- Leo Brewer (1919–2005), American physical chemist
- Les Brewer (1922–2019), American businessman, founder of College of the Atlantic
- Lindsay Brewer (born 1997), American model and racing driver
- Lingg Brewer (born 1944), American politician and educator
- Lloyd Brewer (1929–2003), Australian rules footballer
- Lucy Brewer, literary pen-name of first woman Marine
- Lynn Brewer, American businesswoman
- Madeline Brewer (born 1992), American actress
- Margaret A. Brewer (1930–2013), United States Marine Corps general
- Maria E. Brewer, American diplomat
- Marilyn Brewer (born 1937), American politician
- Marilynn Brewer, American psychologist
- Mark Brewer (disambiguation), several people
- Martha Farmer Brewer (1928–2006), American political spouse, first lady of Alabama 1968–71
- Maura Brewer, American performance artist
- McKinley Brewer (1896–1955), American baseball player
- Mel Brewer (1918–1977), American football player and coach
- Mike Brewer (disambiguation), several people
- Montie Brewer (born 1957), American businessman
- Neil Brewer (British musician and songwriter)
- Nick Brewer (born 1989), British rapper
- Nicola Brewer (born 1957), British diplomat and academic administrator
- Nicole Brewer (born 1983), American beauty queen
- O. H. P. Brewer (died 1891), Cherokee politician
- O. H. P. Brewer Jr. (1871–1951), Cherokee politician
- Peggy Brewer Musgrave (1924–2017), British-American economist
- Phil D. Brewer (1861–1932), American politician
- Rebecca Brewer (born 1983), Canadian multi-disciplinary artist
- Rhett Brewer, musician
- Richard Brewer, several people including:
  - Richard B. Brewer (1951–2012), American businessman
  - Richard M. Brewer (Dick Brewer, 1850–1878), American cowboy
  - Rick Brewer, Canadian politician
- R. J. Brewer, ring name of John Stagikas (born 1979), American professional wrestler
- Robert Brewer (disambiguation), several people
- Rod Brewer (born 1966), American baseball player
- Ron Brewer (born 1955), American basketball player
- Ron Brewer (Canadian football) (1937–2024), Canadian football player
- Ron Brewer (politician) (1921–2003), Australian politician
- Ronnie Brewer (born 1985), American basketball player
- Rosalind Brewer (born 1962), American business executive and chemist
- Ross Brewer (born 1953), Australian rules footballer
- Ross Brewer (gymnast) (born 1979), British gymnast
- Roy Brewer (1909–2006), American trade union leader
- Ruth Brewer Eisenberg (1902–1996), American pianist
- Ryan Brewer, American football player
- Samuel Brewer (1670–1743), English botanist
- Samuel Brewer (dissenter) (1724–1796), English dissenting clergyman
- Sandra Brewer, Australian politician
- Sarina Brewer, American artist
- Scott Brewer, American politician and judge
- Sean Brewer (born 1977), American football player
- Shaft Brewer Jr. (born 1999), American soccer player
- Sherwood Brewer (1923–2003), American baseball player and manager
- Stella Brewer Brookes (1903–1993), American folklorist, writer and professor
- Stephen Brewer (born 1948), American politician
- Steve Brewer (born 1957), American fiction author
- Talbot Brewer, American philosopher
- Teresa Brewer (1931–2007), American singer
- Thandi Brewer (died 2019), South African showrunner
- Tina Williams Brewer, American artist
- Thomas Brewer, several people including:
  - Thomas Mayo Brewer (1814–1880), American naturalist
  - Tom Brewer (1931–2018), American baseball player
- Tim Brewer (born 1955), American NASCAR crew chief and analyst
- Trevor Brewer (1930–2018), Welsh rugby union international player
- Trey Brewer (born 1985), American bodybuilder
- Vivion Brewer (1900–1991), American activist
- William Brewer, several people including:
  - William D. Brewer (1922–2009), American ambassador
  - William Henry Brewer (1828–1910), American botanist
- Willis Brewer (1844–1912), American politician
- Wilmon Brewer (1895–1998), American classical scholar
- Xavier Brewer (born 1990), American football player and coach
- Zach Brewer (1979–2024), American racing driver

== See also ==
- Brasseur
- Brauer
- Bernie Brewer, Bonnie Brewer, mascots for the Milwaukee Brewers
- Breuer
- Brewster
- Brouwer
- Sládek
