= C. J. (given name) =

C. J. is a given name or nickname and may refer to:

== People ==
- CJ (rapper) (born 1997), American rapper
- C. J. Allen (disambiguation), multiple people
- C. J. Anderson (born 1991), American football player
- CJ Bailey, American football player
- C. J. Beathard (born 1993), American football quarterback
- C. J. Bott (born 1995), New Zealander footballer
- C. J. Brewer (disambiguation), multiple people
- C. J. Carella, RPG author
- CJ Carr (born 2005), American football player
- C. J. Chatham (born 1994), American professional baseball player
- C. J. Cherryh (born 1942), American writer of speculative fiction
- C. J. Culpepper (born 2001), American baseball player
- C. J. de Mooi (born 1969), British professional quizzer who appeared on BBC Television's Eggheads until 2012
- CJ Dippre (born 2003), American football player
- C. J. Elleby (born 2000), American basketball player in the Israeli Basketball Premier League
- C.J. Fite (born 2005), American football player
- C. J. Gardner-Johnson (born 1997), American football player
- C. J. Hicks (born 2003), American football player
- C. J. Harris (disambiguation), multiple people
- CJ Hamilton, multiple people
- C. J. Hanson (born 2001), American football player
- C. J. Henderson (disambiguation), multiple people
- CJ McCollum (born 1991), American NBA basketball player
- C. J. McLaughlin (born 1992), American racing driver
- C. J. Miles (born 1987), American NBA basketball player
- C. J. Montes (born 2002), American football player
- C. J. Moore (born 1995), American football player
- C. J. Nitkowski (born 1973), American baseball player
- C. J. Okoye (born 2001), Nigerian American football player
- CJ Pearson (born 2002), American journalist and political commentator
- C. J. Perry (born 1985), American professional wrestling manager under the ring name Lana
- C. J. Ramone (born 1965), stage name of Christopher Joseph Ward, best known for working as the bassist and sometimes vocalist of the Ramones
- C. J. Ravenell (born 2000), American football player
- C. J. Reavis (born 1995), American football player
- C. J. Sanders (born 1996), American football player and former child actor
- C. J. Sanders (surveyor) (1846–1923), Australian surveyor
- C. J. Saunders (born 1996), American football player
- C. J. Snare (born 1964), American vocalist and keyboardist of FireHouse
- CJ Stander (born 1990), South African rugby player in Ireland
- C. J. Stroud (born 2001), American football player
- C. J. Stubbs (born 1996), American baseball player
- CJ Ujah (born 1994), British sprinter
- C. J. Verdell (born 1999), American football player
- C. J. Watson (born 1984), American basketball player
- CJ West (born 2002), American football player
- CJ Wildheart (born 1967), guitarist/vocalist with the Wildhearts and Honeycrack
- C. J. Williams (born 1990), American basketball player in the Israeli Basketball Premier League

=== Fictional characters ===
- C. J. Barnes, a fictional character on the television show 8 Simple Rules portrayed by David Spade
- C. J. Cregg, fictional character on the television show The West Wing
- Charles "C. J." Jefferson, a fictional character in The Fall and Rise of Reginald Perrin
- Carl "C. J." Johnson, fictional main character of the video game Grand Theft Auto: San Andreas
- C. J. Parker, fictional character on the television show Baywatch
- C. J., a character from the Cartoon Network animated series Regular Show
- Captain Jason "C.J." Stentley, police captain on the TV show Brooklyn Nine-Nine

== See also ==
- CJ (disambiguation)
