= John Brewer =

John Brewer may refer to:

- John Brewer (American football, born 1906) (1906–1980), American football player
- John Brewer (athlete) (1950–2022), American Paralympic medalist
- Jack Brewer (bishop) (1929–2000), Roman Catholic bishop of Lancaster, England
- John Brewer (fullback) (1928–1983), American football player
- John Brewer (historian) (born 1947), professor of history at Caltech and winner of Wolfson Prize in History
- John Brewer (monk) (1744–1822), English Benedictine monk
- John Brewer (MP) (1654–1724), British member of parliament for New Romney
- John Brewer (Michigan politician) (1800–1870), American farmer and politician in Michigan
- John Brewer (rugby league) (born 1972), Australian rugby league player
- John Sherren Brewer (1810–1879), English clergyman, historian and scholar
- John Francis Brewer (1865–1921), English novelist and organist
- John David Brewer (born 1951), English sociologist
- Johnny Brewer (1937–2011), American football tight end and linebacker
- J. Hart Brewer (1844–1900), American representative for New Jersey
- J. Mason Brewer (1896–1975), American folklorist

== See also ==
- Jack Brewer (disambiguation)
- John Brewer Brown (1836–1898), American member of the United States House of Representatives
- Hotel Haegumgang, formerly the John Brewer Floating Hotel
