= CJ =

CJ or similar may refer to:

== Businesses ==
- CJ Affiliate, an online advertising company
- CJ Group (also known as Cheil Jedang), a South Korean conglomerate
- CJ CheilJedang, South Korean food and beverage company within the CJ Group
- BA CityFlyer (IATA airline designator)
- China Northern Airlines (IATA airline designator)

== In law ==
- Chief Justice, an honorific title for the presiding member of a Supreme Court
- Criminal justice

== People ==
- C. J. (given name), persons and fictional characters

== Publications ==
- The Classical Journal (Journal of the Classical Association of the Middle West and South)
- The Courier-Journal, a newspaper in Louisville, Kentucky, United States

== In science and technology ==
- Cangjie input method, a system by which Chinese characters may be entered into a computer using a standard keyboard
- Centijoule, an SI unit of energy equal to 10^{−2} J
- Cobra Jet, a performance engine designation of the Ford FE engine
- Jeep CJ (Civilian Jeep) series, a military-based off-road vehicle
- Cessna CitationJet, a line of business jets by Cessna Aircraft Company

== Other uses ==
- Chemins de fer du Jura, a Swiss railway company
- ChinaJoy
- Cianjur railway station, a railway station in Cianjur Regency, Indonesia
- Cluj County, on the vehicle registration plates of Romania
- Congregation of Jesus or Congregatio Jesu, a Catholic congregation

== See also ==
- Creutzfeldt–Jakob disease
- Cangjie (disambiguation)
