= Frewer =

Frewer is a surname. Notable people with the surname include:

- John Frewer (1883–1974), Anglican bishop in Australia
- Matt Frewer (born 1958), American-Canadian actor
- Terry Frewer, Canadian film music composer

== See also ==
- Brewer (surname)
