= George Brewer =

George Brewer may refer to:

- George Brewer (writer) (1766–?), English miscellaneous writer
- George Emerson Brewer (1861–1939), American surgeon and urologist
- George E. Brewer (1832–1922), American historian
- George W. Brewer (fl. 1860), American politician
- George Reeves (1914–1959), born George Keefer Brewer, American actor

== See also ==
- George Bruere (died 1743), MP for Great Marlow
- George James Bruere (c. 1721–1780), British Governor of Bermuda
