= Walker's Hibernian Magazine =

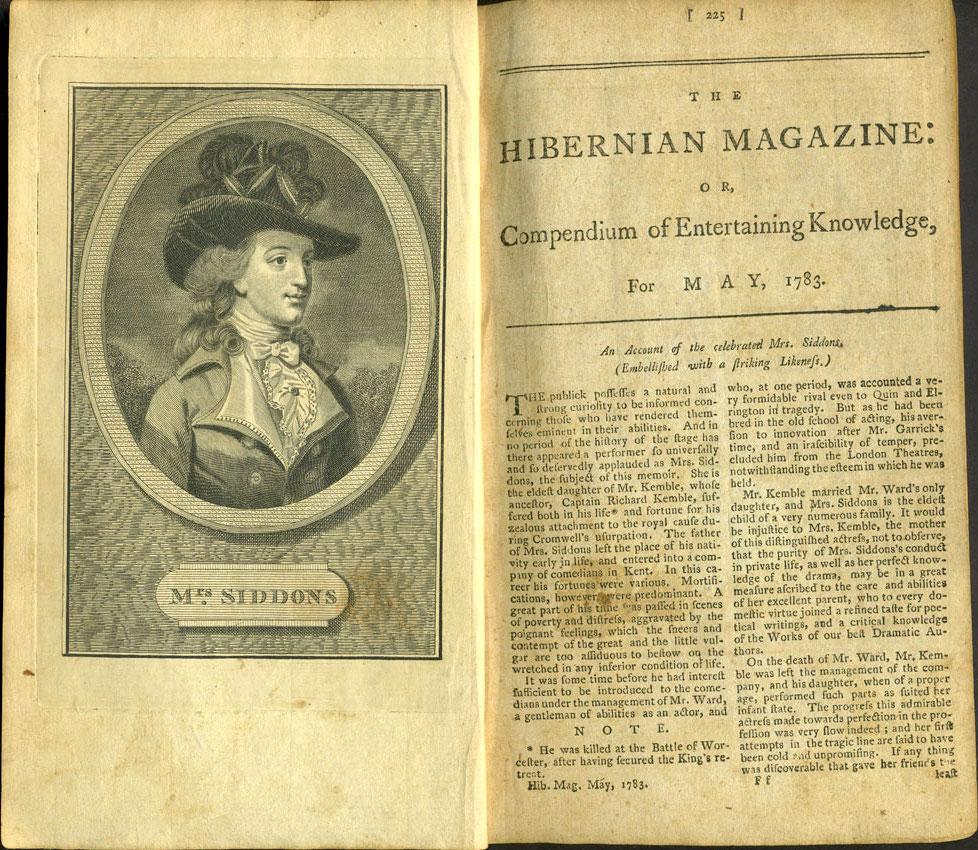
- May 1783 issue of Walker's Hibernian Magazine
- Founder: James Potts
- First issue: 1770s
- Final issue: 1812
- Country: Ireland

Walker's Hibernian Magazine, or Compendium of Entertaining Knowledge was a general-interest magazine published monthly in Dublin, Ireland, from February 1771 to July 1812. Until 1785 it was called The Hibernian Magazine or Compendium of Entertaining Knowledge (Containing, the greatest variety of the most curious and useful subjects in every branch of polite literature). Tom Clyde called it "the pinnacle of eighteenth-century Irish literary magazines".

== Publishers ==
The founding publisher was James Potts of Dame Street, who had published the Dublin Courier from 1766. From October 1772 until at least July 1773 (Note: Clyde lists Peter Seguin as the publisher from October 1773, and Thomas Walker from June 1778. This conflicts with Gargett and Sheridan and Pollard.) Peter Seguin of St Stephen's Green published a rival version with differing format. Potts ceded in March 1774 to Thomas Walker, also of Dame Street, who added his surname to the magazine's title in May 1785. There was some production overlap at this time with Exshaw's Magazine, since John Exshaw was selling out to Walker; this has caused later confusion. Thomas Walker retired from the publishing business in 1797, having ceded the Hibernian Magazine at the end of 1790 to his relative (Note: John Thomas Gilbert says Joseph was Thomas Walker's son, and Pollard says he "probably" was. Louis D. Melnick says that Thomas died in 1817, unmarried but with sons named Thomas, George and Rev. Thomas Frederick.) Joseph Walker, who died in 1805.

== Content ==
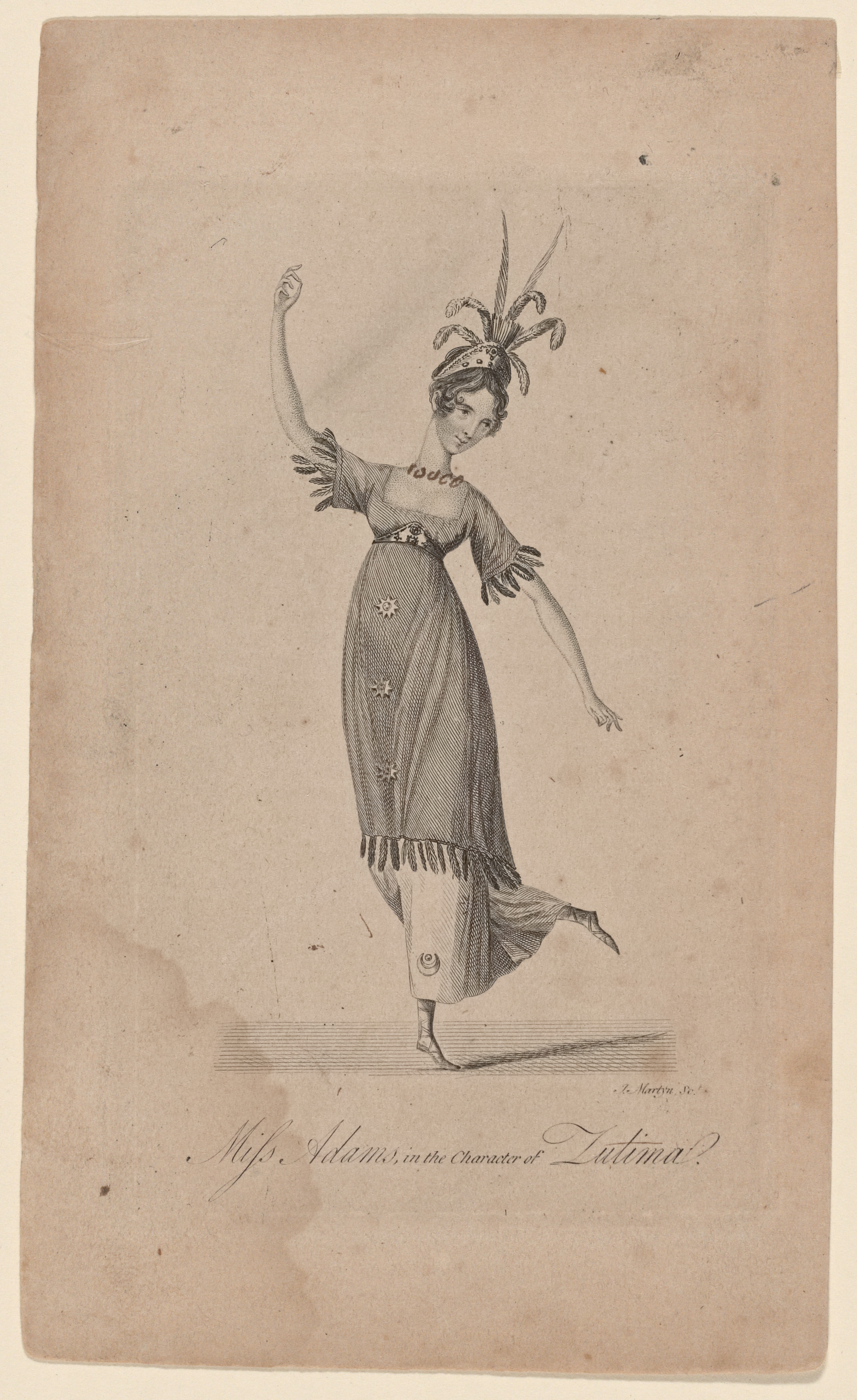
"Miss Adams in the character of Zulima" [from the ballet Zelico; or, The Rival Mexicans]. Engraving by John Martyn in the December 1803 issue.

The magazine had high production values, with regular illustrations and sometimes sheet music. It gave early encouragement to Thomas Moore. According to Tom Clyde, "very little of the creative writing is worth reading"; it often featured Orientalism and rarely Romanticism. Much of the non-Irish material was reprinted from the European Magazine. In 1883 C. J. Hamilton wrote:

What the Gentleman's Magazine was to England, Walker's Hibernian Magazine was to Ireland during the latter half of the eighteenth century. It has, perhaps, a more marked individuality of character and a stronger flavour of provincialism than the Gentleman's, and for these causes suits the curiosity-monger even better. It was at once a newspaper and a monthly miscellany of useful and entertaining literature. It not only gave parliamentary debates and the latest births, deaths, and marriages, but also tit-bits of London and Dublin gossip, the newest outrages, the most thrilling sentimental tales à la Werther, along with scraps of poetry and tête-à-tête portraits of the leading fashionable belles and beaux of the day.

Up to about 1795, the magazine showed sympathy for women's rights and Catholic emancipation. Afterwards it became more reactionary in opposition to the United Irishmen. With the onset of the Napoleonic Wars, news and patriotic coverage crowded out cultural and antiquarian content.

It is a primary source for Irish history of the period; its unofficial report of the trial of Robert Emmet in September 1803 differs from the official trial transcript and includes the first version of his celebrated speech from the dock. An index to marriages announced in its pages was compiled by Henry Farrar in the 1890s.

== List of Walker's Hibernian Magazine available free online ==
Year	Title	Citation (Link)
1774	A Compendium of Entertaining Knowledge for the Year - Volume IV	
1775	A Compendium of Entertaining Knowledge for the Year - Volume V	
1776	A Compendium of Entertaining Knowledge for the Year - Volume VI	
1777	A Compendium of Entertaining Knowledge for the Year - Volume VII	
1780	A Compendium of Entertaining Knowledge for the Year	
1781	A Compendium of Entertaining Knowledge for the Year	
1783	A Compendium of Entertaining Knowledge for the Year	
1796	A Compendium of Entertaining Knowledge for the Year	
1803	A Compendium of Entertaining Knowledge for the Year	
1809	A Compendium of Entertaining Knowledge for the Year	
1811	A Compendium of Entertaining Knowledge for the Year	
