= Retlaw =

Retlaw may refer to:

== Companies ==
- Retlaw Enterprises, privately held company owned by the Disney family

== People ==
- C. J. Hamilton (author) (1841–1935), author who wrote under the pen name Retlaw Spring
- Retlaw Yensid, an alias of Walt Disney
- William Retlaw Williams (1863–1944), Welsh writer

== Places ==
- Retlaw, Alberta
