= Stella Brewer Brookes =

American folklorist, writer, professor

- Stella Brewer Brookes, from a 1936 magazine
- Born: January 22, 1903; Fannnin, Texas
- Died: November 1993; Austin, Texas
- Occupation(s): College professor, writer
- Spouse: Enos Luther Brookes
- Relatives: J. Mason Brewer (brother)

Stella Brewer Brookes (January 22, 1903 – November 1993) was a professor of English at Clark College (later Clark Atlanta University) from 1924 to 1969. She was a folklorist and a writer.

== Early life and education ==
Brewer was born in Fannin, Texas, one of the six children of J.H. Brewer and Minnie Brewer. Her father was a grocer and her mother was a schoolteacher. Her brother J. Mason Brewer was also a folklorist. In 1923 she graduated valedictorian and magna cum laude from Wiley College in Marshall, Texas. She earned a Master of Arts in English Literature in 1930 from the University of Michigan, and completed doctoral studies at Cornell University in 1946, after her husband died. Her dissertation was titled "Folklore in the Writings of Joel Chandler Harris".

== Career ==
In 1924 Brewer became a professor at Clark College in Atlanta; there, she chaired the English department, advised student publication, The Mentor, and founded the Atlanta University Center's Literary Symposium. She also taught summer programs at the Alabama State Teachers College. She was the author of Joel Chandler Harris, Folklorist. (1950), and other works on Harris. Stella Brewer Brookes retired from Clark College in 1969, after 45 years, and received an Honorary Doctor of Letters degree from the college.

Brookes and her husband were active in the NAACP in Atlanta; she delivered the chapter's Emancipation Day address in 1939. She was also active in the Georgia Federation of Colored Women's Clubs. In 1948, she was chosen to be the “Bronze Woman of the Year in Education” in Atlanta by Iota Phi Lambda sorority. She received other honors from the International Mark Twain Society and local television station WSB.

== Personal life ==
in 1928. Stella Brewer married Enos Luther Brookes, a Jamaican-born chemistry and physics professor at Clark College. They were married in the college's Crogman Chapel. Her husband died in 1944. Stella Brewer Brookes died in November 1993, aged 90 years, in Austin, Texas. Her papers are in the Robert W. Woodruff Library of the Atlanta University Center.

== Publications ==
- Brookes, Stella Brewer (2009). Joel Chandler Harris, Folklorist. University of Georgia Press. ISBN 9780820334370.
- Brookes, Stella Brewer, Introduction, in: Harris, Joel Chandler, Uncle Remus, Schocken Books, New York 1965, pp. vii–xx.
