= Carmelite Brewer Christie =

American missionary (1852–1931)

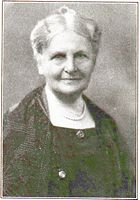
- Born: Sarah Carmelite Brewer; April 25, 1852; Lee Center, Lee, Illinois, US
- Died: October 17, 1931 (aged 79); Eagle Rock, California, US
- Occupations: Missionary, educator
- Years active: 1871-1920
- Known for: Assisting Armenians in 1895, 1909 and 1915-1919 in Tarsus Turkey
- Notable work: Letters & diaries about her daily life in Turkey in both peace and troubled times

Carmelite Brewer Christie was a Congregational missionary in the Ottoman Empire from 1877 to 1920 and served as the acting president of the St. Paul's College during World War I. She was the college's sole American caretaker, though her husband Thomas Davidson Christie was the named president.

Christie's letters and diaries are part of the Minnesota Historical Society Christie Collection and provide a first-hand account of the Armenian massacre of 1895, Ottoman Turkish politics in the pre- and post-World War I era, the Armenian genocide of 1915 and its aftermath. During the Adana massacre, she refused to abandon the school, students and refugees who had fled there, guarding up to 5,000 people under her protection and hoisting the American flag.

== Early life ==
Sarah Carmelite Brewer, known as Carmelite, was born in Lee Center, Illinois, on 25 April 1852 to Elizabeth (née Pratt) and Rev. James Brewer. On her father's side of the family, she was descended from Captain John Brewer, veteran of the French and Indian War and a relative of the Supreme Court Justice, David Josiah Brewer. Carmelite was a cousin of Rev. Josiah Brewer, father of Justice Brewer, who was an early missionary and school founder sent by the American Board to Greece and Turkey. He was one reason Thomas and Carmelite ended up in Turkey.

Her father was a preacher who graduated from Williams College some 30 years after the Haystack Prayer Meeting, which resulted in the American Board of Commissioners for Foreign Missions. After graduation, he taught in schools in the South. He joined his brother Ira after riding from Montgomery, Alabama to Lee County in 1847. James was a farmer and the principal of the new academy in Lee Center in 1850. He was ordained in 1859.

She graduated in 1871 from the Rockford Seminary for Women, a progressive academy. Rockford was the sister college of Beloit College in Wisconsin. She taught school in Lee Center until she married a graduate of Beloit, Thomas Davidson Christie on 14 March 1872.

== Missionary period ==
Carmelite joined her new husband in Wisconsin, where he taught at Beloit College and the University of Wisconsin, while working on his master's degree, and she began their family with the births of their first two daughters, Elizabeth Norton. Thomas and his young family went to Andover Theological Seminary for his further studies. Their daughter Anna Carmelite was born in there in 1875. Daughter Elizabeth died of scarlet fever in 1876. Thomas graduated and was ordained as a minister the next year. Carmelite was appointed as a missionary by the American Board of Missions in Asiatic Turkey in 1877. Thomas, Carmelite and their young daughter Anna moved to Marash, Turkey that same year, where he taught at the Central Turkey Theological Seminary. In addition to preparing young men for college in the period between 1877 and 1893, she expanded their family to include: Emerson Brewer, Mary Phelps, Paul Theodore, Agnes Emily, and Jean Ogilvy.

Carmelite and the children returned to the Beloit for the period from 1888 to 1890 for the children's education and then returned to Turkey. In 1893 the family moved to Tarsus to take up a post at St. Paul's College. Carmelite by character and situation assumed non-traditional roles overseas. As part of his duties, Thomas left Turkey to raise money or went to surrounding mission stations to support them. In addition to her family responsibilities, she was involved in the activities of St. Paul's College and the education of women and a supporter of suffrage for unmarried women. After the 1895 massacre at Marash, Carmelite wrote letters describing the events which were published in American newspapers. She reported on deaths, woundings, damage to the schools in Marash and threats to the missionary workers. Her reports were personal, having spent fifteen years among those who were living through the crisis and in one letter, she reported that she and her husband had been warned regarding violence which might spread to Tarsus. By August, the rioting had reached them, though the Christies were not at the school when it was looted. In the face of the ongoing violence, the family fled to Mersina, and eventually Carmelite returned with the children to the United States between 1897 and 1898 for their safety and schooling.

=== 1909 riots ===
Carmelite's son-in-law Rev. Miner Rogers, Reverend Herbert Adams Gibbons and her husband went to the annual conference of Armenian ministers and expatriate missionaries in Adana, Turkey on 13 April 1909. While they were there, Rogers and another missionary, Henry Maurer, were killed by gunfire during the Adana massacre. The men were carrying water to put out a fire in order to protect a missionary run dispensary. Thomas Christie could not immediately return to Tarsus. During the week he was away, some of the rioters went to Tarsus. Locals joined them in setting the Tarsus Armenian quarter on fire. Through Carmelite's efforts, the school survived despite protecting around 5,000 refugees on the grounds of the college. When regular soldiers began to join in with the violence and the mob turned toward the campus, Carmelite raised an American flag and refused the evacuation request of the consular saying, "I prefer to die with my students and the Armenian people than to hand them over to Turks and save myself." The campus was surrounded by the mob, which replaced the water in the fire extinguishing system with kerosene to torch the school and refugees, when word to cease the hostilities was received from the Young Turks in Constantinople.

Thomas and Gibbons returned to tell of Rogers' death to their own wives, and break the news to his daughter Mary and her infant child. Carmelite nursed and comforted the injured and dying, provided food for them and she and Helen Gibbons sewed clothes for infants. For two weeks after the violence, Carmelite was called upon to give constant care to the sick, the children of the refugees and orphans. However, within months of the events, the school was back in operation. Carmelite gave a glowing report of their progress under her leadership as acting president while her husband was back in the states.

=== Results of the Tehcir Law of 1915 and World War I ===
The Christies were at St. Paul's when the Ottoman Empire joined the Central Powers at the start of WWI. The Tehcir (forced displacement) Law and another law which allowed expropriation and confiscation of Armenian property was passed by the Ottoman Parliament in May 1915. Teachers and students at St. Paul's were ordered to leave Tarsus for Syria. Thomas traveled in June 1915 to Constantinople to request that the government not deport teachers or students. He was not allowed to return to Tarsus for the duration of the conflict. A short time later, Carmelite arranged for her family and future son-in-law to leave for America but she stayed. During the War, she kept the college open, distributed relief supplies and chronicled events in a summary she sent to the American Board of Commissioners for Foreign Missions after the war ended. In her summary, Carmelite chronicles how the Turkish Army requested use of their halls for regimental soldiers and officers, for use a hospital during the cholera and typhus epidemic in 1915, and as a quarters to house English prisoners of war. Carmelite negotiated with the authorities, making small concessions during the war which allowed them to keep operating the college. In addition, she provided aid to refugees, writing, "...100,000 exiles were said to have passed Tarsus en route for regions beyond. Of these, we helped as many as we could with money, food and clothing where it was possible by protecting them. Some of these we hid, for others we found work that counted as Government service, and so saved them from being deported further."

Carmelite made regular visits to families, local officials and the military (including several audiences with Enver Pasha). Her diary chronicled the stream of Armenians from all over Turkey that passed through Tarsus. Most were on foot and were being directed to Syria. She also noted the wounded coming back from the front and the conditions which ethnic Turks and Armenians suffered during the war. Thomas returned to briefly to Tarsus in 1919, not a well man.

== Diary ==
Carmelite made entries in a diary from 1868 to 1931. About 20 of these volumes, along with correspondence, address books and memorandums are in the Minnesota Historical Society's archives. They have been used by historians and researchers. Her entries during her time at Tarsus are controversial in the context of the interpretation of events surrounding Turkish, Armenian, Kurdish, Greek and various other political and religious groups.

Reverend Richard Walker Rockwell supplied Arnold Toynbee with what was reported to be a transcribed copy of Mrs. Christie's diary, with many people's names omitted or noted with initials. Toynbee edited the "Blue Book" in 1916 and included some entries of Mrs. Christie. At the time, Turkish critics said the Blue Book was an exaggeration, events fabricated by missionaries and clearly a piece of WWI British propaganda. They pointed out that Toynbee pressured Rev. Rockwell for names, so as editor, he could assure the reader these people existed. Toynbee did not get the names but included Mrs. Christie's entries.

In general, her diaries document her activities and her opinions about events around her, including her family.

== Later life ==
In 1919, Carmelite and Thomas returned to the United States, where Thomas briefly became pastor at the Union Church in Palm Springs, California. After the couple's daughter Agnes, who had been suffering from ill health, committed suicide in December 1919, the couple's youngest daughter, Jean, went to Tarsus to help her mother prepare to return to the United States. They made their home in Eagle Rock, California among a large community of Armenians. Thomas died in 1921. In the last years of her life, Carmelite lived in Pasadena with her daughter Jean, who taught at Occidental College.

== Death and legacy ==
Carmelite died on October 17, 1931, in Pasadena.

The Minnesota Historical Society was given a trunk full of Christie family letters in 1965. The Christie family was asked to give or make copies of other letters and diaries for a permanent Christie collection. In 2016, the collection occupied over 20 cubic feet for Thomas & his family and about the same for his father and siblings. This collection includes Carmelite's continuous diary she kept from 1865 to 1931, giving important historical, first person accounts of the turbulent times of Turkey's history at the turn of the twentieth century through the First World War.

== Children ==
Five of Carmelite's six surviving children were born in Turkey. The more notable have a common thread that echoed Carmelite's own life of social service and education.

Anna Carmelite Christie (1875-1910) was born in Wisconsin and traveled to Turkey with her parents when they moved there. She had poor health and though schooled in both Europe and the United States, she spent much of her life living in the U.S. quietly pursuing musical interests and performing charitable works.

Emerson Brewer Christie (1878-1967) was a noted linguist and ethnologist. He graduated from Yale, taught at St. Paul's College and then in the Philippines. He also taught at University of Michigan and Temple University. He was Chief of the US State Department's Bureau of Translation from 1928 to 1944.

Mary Phelps Christie (1881-1975) was born in and spent a great deal of her life in Turkey. She attended Bryn Mawr College and studied at the Hartford Female Seminary, graduating in 1908. Mary married Daniel Miner Rogers (1882-1909) and they joined her parents in Tarsus. After the death of Rogers, she returned with their child to the United States. In 1911, she returned to Tarsus to teach. She met her second husband, William Nute, and they married in Tarsus. Mary and her child returned to the States so William could complete his medical training. They returned to Turkey, where Mary taught and William ran rural medical clinics, until their retirement, when she returned to California.

Paul Theodore Christie (1883-1959) was born and raised in Turkey. Like his siblings, he was sent away as a teenager for further education. Paul attended schools in Greece, Switzerland and Germany. He graduated from Hotchkiss School in 1903 and Harvard University in 1907. He was a French teacher and athletic coach at St. George's School until World War II. He retired and, during the war, worked at a Grumman airplane factory as a riveter in California. He continued to teach swimming until he died.

Agnes Emily Christie (1887-1919) attended schools in Europe and the United States, though her education was interrupted because of poor health at various times. Trained as a dental hygienist, she worked in that field until she became depressed and committed suicide.

Jean Ogilvie Christie (1891-1984) graduated from Wellesley College in 1915. She returned to Turkey and taught in Constantinople. Jean was forced to stop teaching there in 1917 and worked with the YMCA in France. Jean helped her mother return to the United States and settle in California in 1920. She was a teacher at Occidental College and at the University of California, Berkeley. She was married to Eugene V. Lien.
