= Las Catalinas, Costa Rica =

Las Catalinas Resort
- Interactive map of Las Catalinas Resort
- Coordinates: 10.481997°N 85.785682°W
- Country: Costa Rica

Area
  - City: 4.86 km^{2} (1.88 sq mi)
  - Land: 4.86 km^{2} (1.875 sq mi)
  - Urban: 0.97 km^{2} (0.37 sq mi)
- Time zone: UTC-6 (CST)
- Website: www.lascatalinascr.com

Las Catalinas is a private resort founded in 2006 along the shores of the Pacific Ocean in the Guanacaste Province of northwest Costa Rica. The objective was to create a compact, car-free, and fully walkable resort, based on the principles of New Urbanism. Las Catalinas was founded by Charles Brewer (businessman), who was intrigued by the effect walkable private resorts have on the health, happiness and well being, of humans.

== Overview ==
Las Catalinas is located on the coast of Playa Danta and Playa Dantita near Potrero, near Daniel Oduber Quiros International Airport in Liberia. Projected as a 20+ year project, the exclusive private beach resort incorporates the principles of New Urbanism to enable an environment that claims to favor human connection and interaction with numerous urban facilities. It is located in at the center of over 404 hectares of tropical dry forest hills and valleys. Las Catalinas has an extensive network of hiking, running, and biking trails and has an annual Triathlon and Open Water competition.

== Tourism ==
Las Catalinas has gained international acclaim for its small-town environment, authentic Costa Rican culture, and scenery. The town offers stays in hotels, villas, and flats. Its architecture was inspired by colonial towns in Latin America such as Antigua, Panama's Casco Viejo, Panama, and San Miguel de Allende, as well as Mediterranean hill and coastal towns. The natural environment and proximity to the sea makes swimming, standup paddleboarding, kayaking, boogie boarding, and snorkeling popular activities in the area.

== Natural reserve ==
Approximately 400 ha (990 acres) of the 490 ha (1,200 acres) of Las Catalinas are currently a natural forest reserve. It harbors diverse, local flora and fauna including numerous bird species, howler monkeys, iguanas, and the occasional wild cat. There are about 35 kilometers of hiking, running and single track mountain biking trails. The resort is car-free.

== Architecture and urbanism ==
=== Urban Design ===
The planning of Las Catalinas was primarily executed by Douglas Duany, currently a professor at the University of Notre Dame School of Architecture. It is densely designed and focuses on the pedestrian experience by maximizing views and integrating nature. Of the 490 hectares, approximately 80 hectares are planned to be built on, while the remaining 404 hectares will be left as a natural reserve.

=== Architecture ===
Many urban designers and architects have since done design work in Las Catalinas, including:

- Lew Oliver Inc.
- TSW
- ASARQ
- Robert Orr
- Abraham Valenzuela
- Gary Justiss
- Dungan-Nequette
- Michael G. Imber
- Garrison Foundry
- BCV Architects
- Basalt Architecture & Project Development
- Lauren Richa
- Studio Sky
