= Together (2009 film) =

- Official Poster
- Directed by: Eicke Bettinga
- Written by: Eicke Bettinga; Zorana Piggott
- Produced by: Zorana Piggott
- Starring: Matt Smith; John Vine; Amanda Boxer; Guy Flanagan
- Cinematography: André Götzmann
- Edited by: Dan Robinson; Oliver Szyza
- Music by: Rhett Brewer
- Release date: May 2009 (Cannes)
- Running time: 14 minutes
- Country: United Kingdom
- Language: English

Together is a short film drama directed by Eicke Bettinga and starring Matt Smith. The film premiered in the Critics' Week section at the 2009 Cannes Film Festival.

== Premise ==
A year after his brother's death, Rob discovers that the only way to help his father cope with the loss is to "force" his affection onto him.

== Critical reception ==
"How fine is the line that separates an unilateral embrace from a struggle? Eicke Bettinga reinvents the elaboration of a loss, starting from suffused grief to explode in a climax where the only language that still seems to have any meaning is that of the body." - Milano Film Festival.

"Together focuses the narrative on an emotional build-up rather than on momentous explanations and futile dialogue. Gazes, pauses, and gestures reveal more about the relationships than words could suggest." - Nisimazine, Cannes 2009.
