= Enos Luther Brookes =

African American chemist, activist

Enos Luther Brookes in The Crisis, 1939

Enos Luther Brookes (1891–1944) was a chemist, academic, and activist for civil rights in the United States. He was born in Jamaica, then a British colony.

== Early life and education ==
Born in Jamaica, his father was school teacher James M. Brookes and his mother Martha Brookes. He came to the United States in 1914.

He attended Tuskegee Institute and his bachelor's degree from Lincoln University in 1923 where he was valedictorian. He received his master's degree in chemistry from Columbia University in 1928.

== Academic work ==
Brookes served as a faculty member at Columbia University and was also a faculty member at Clark University. He was the head of the Department of Science at Clark University. He also worked at Alabama State University and at Florida A & M. He was a founder of Alpha Delta Alpha Scientific Society at Clark University. In collaboration with Mr. Henry Lewis Van Dyke of Alabama State College, Professor Brookes wrote a syllabus for "Survey of the Physical Sciences" via a grant from the General Education Board of New York City. He is one of the Black Faces of Science on the North Carolina A & T mural.

== Civic work ==
Brookes served as the President of the Atlanta branch of the NAACP. He spoke at a number of NAACP regional conferences. He was key in setting up a task force in dealing with internal conflicts that plagued the NAACP. He was a member of the Alpha Phi Alpha fraternity and founded the chapter of Alpha Phi Alpha at Clark University. He served on the board of directors of the Atlanta Tuberculosis Association.

== Personal life ==
In 1928, he married English professor Stella Lucille Brewer. He died of a heart attack in 1944.
