= Brewer Normal Institute =

American school in Greenwood, South Carolina (1872–1970)

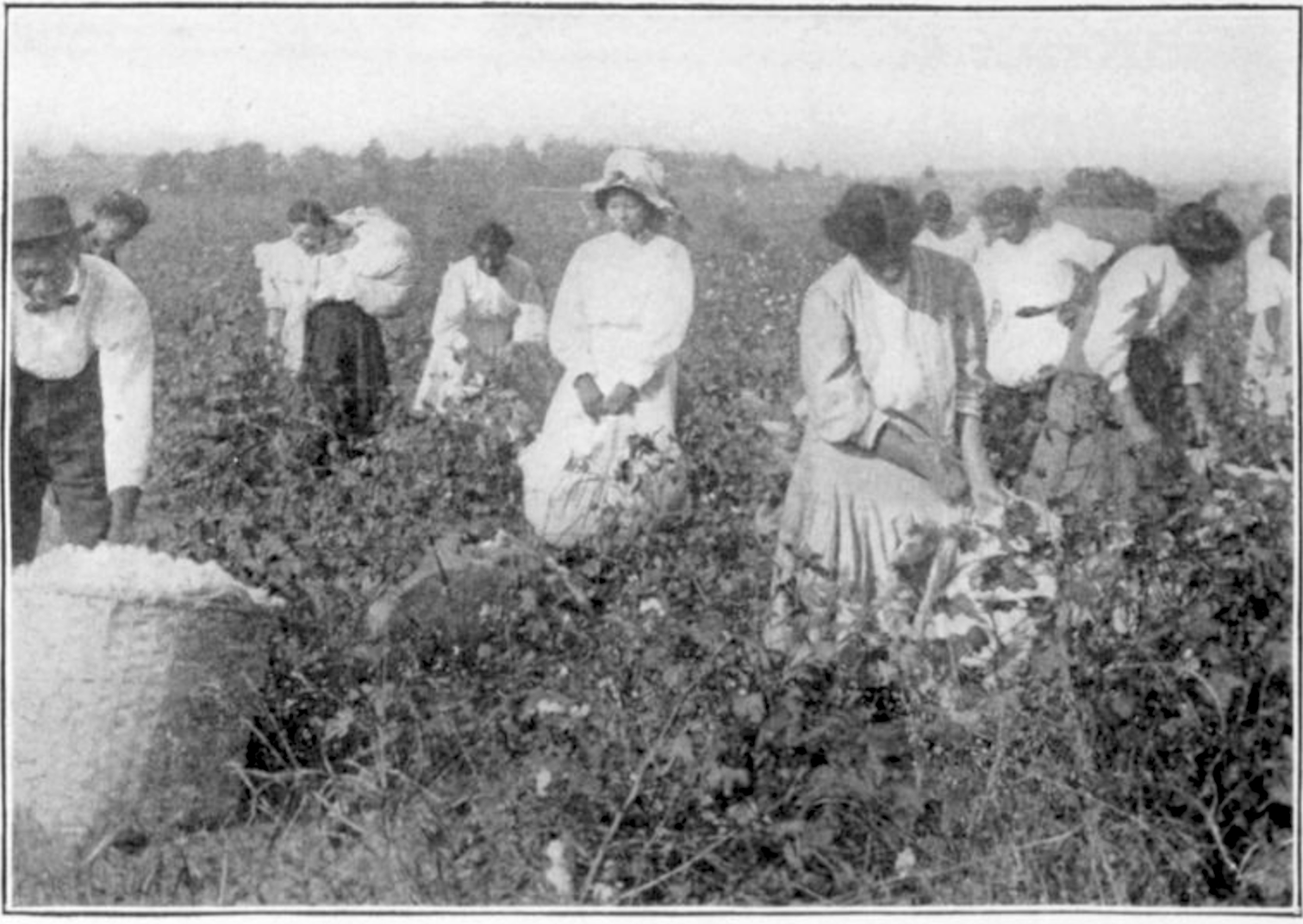
- Cotton picking on the school farm (c. 1909), Brewer Normal Institute

Location
- Greenwood, South Carolina, U.S. 34.1976°N 82.1425°W

Information
- Former name: Brewer Institute, Brewer School, Brewer Normal School
- Type: Private
- Established: 1872
- Closed: June 1970
- Affiliation: American Missionary Association

Brewer Normal Institute (1872–1970) was a segregated private school for African-Americans in Greenwood, South Carolina. It was named after Reverend Josiah Brewer, a member of the first board of trustees for Brewer. After desegregation in 1970, it was succeeded by a public magnet intermediate school named Brewer Middle School. Originally named Brewer Institute, and later became Brewer School, and Brewer Normal School.

== History ==
The American Missionary Association (AMA) opened Brewer Normal Institute in 1872 as a boarding school on East Cambridge Street. The first brick building had been built in 1847 for the former Hodges Institute. It was one of a series of schools established by the AMA during the Reconstruction era, after the American Civil War.

During Brewer Normal Institute's first year, the school had only one teacher. It was named for Rev. Josiah Brewer (1796–1872), a minister, and missionary, and member of the school's first board of trustees. Brewer's son, became a principal at the school. By 1897, the school had an enrollment of 280 students and seven teachers, and it was both a boarding and day school.

The AMA, alongside the black and white community in Greenwood built the Brewer Hospital in hopes of fostering community integration and work towards opening a black public school. The hospital was dedicated on May 24, 1924. The following year in 1925, Brewer Normal Institute became a public school.

From 1945 to 1969, Benjamin James Sanders Jr. served as the school’s principal; he had been initially hired a science teacher starting in 1928.

== Archives and legacy ==
The New York Public Library has a 1909 photograph in their archives of Brewer Normal Institute students picking cotton at the school farm. In 2021, the Museum of Greenwoood was organizing an exhibit on the school's history. The Emerald Triangle Museum & Rail Center exhibit included photographs and yearbook page from the school as well as images of the hospital.

The South Carolina legislature passed a 2002 resolution declaring the school site a historic landmark.
