= John Drew Salmon =

English ornithologist and botanist (1802–1859)

John Drew Salmon (4 September 1802 – 1859) was an English ornithologist and botanist.

== Life ==
Born on 4 September 1802, Salmon lived from 1825 to 1833 at Stoke Ferry and from 1833 to 1837 at Thetford, Norfolk, then moving to Godalming, Surrey. He later was manager of the Wenham Lake Ice Company, and lived over their office in the Strand, London.

Salmon visited the Netherlands in 1825, the Isle of Wight in 1829, and Orkney in 1831. He was elected a fellow of the Linnean Society of London in 1852. He died at Stoke Ferry, on 5 August 1859, aged 57. He had begun in 1828 to form a collection of eggs, part of which he left to the Linnean Society. The remaining portion, with his herbarium and natural history diaries from 1825 to 1837 he left to the Norwich Museum.

== Works ==
In 1836 Salmon published A Notice of the Arrival of Twenty-nine migratory Birds in the Neighbourhood of Thetford, Norfolk. Seven papers of his on ornithology and botany appeared between 1832 and 1852 in the Annals and Magazine of Natural History, The Zoologist and The Phytologist; one on the flora of the neighbourhood of Godalming was reprinted by Edward Newman in The Letters of Rusticus, 1849. Salmon's manuscript notes on the plants of Surrey were incorporated in the Flora of Surrey, which James Alexander Brewer edited for the Holmesdale Natural History Club in 1863. His six fascicles of plant specimens and hand written manuscript from his flora of the neighbourhood of Godalming are in the Charterhouse School Herbarium maintained at the University and Jepson Herbaria, University of California, Berkeley.

== Bibliography ==
- Salmon, J.D.; Brewer, James Alexander (1868). Flora of Surrey, or, A catalogue of the flowering plants and ferns found in the county: With the localities of the rarer species, from the manuscripts of the late J.D. Salmon and from other sources (PDF). London: Van Voorst. OCLC 505159120 (all editions).

== Notes ==
Attribution

This article incorporates text from a publication now in the public domain: Lee, Sidney, ed. (1897). "Salmon, John Drew". Dictionary of National Biography. Vol. 50. London: Smith, Elder & Co.
