= Charles Brewer =

Charles Brewer may refer to:

- Charles Brewer (baseball) (born 1988), American baseball player
- Charles Brewer (American football) (fl.1955), American college football player
- Charles Brewer (businessman) (born 1958), American businessman; founder of MindSpring Enterprises
- Charles Brewer (boxer) (born 1969), American super middleweight boxer
- Charles Brewer-Carías (born 1938), Venezuelan explorer and naturalist
- Charles R. Brewer (1890–1971), Church of Christ professor, preacher, poet, and leader
- Charles Brewer, namesake of C. Brewer & Co., a company in Honolulu, Hawaii
- Charles Edward Brewer, president of Meredith College

== See also ==
- Charley Brewer (disambiguation)
