= Mark Brewer =

Mark Brewer may refer to:

- Mark Brewer (illustrator), American artist
- Mark Brewer (Michigan Democrat), American lawyer and political consultant
- Mark S. Brewer (1837–1901), Republican politician from Michigan
- Mark Brewer (army), Australian army officer who has received the Conspicuous Service Cross twice
