= Luke Joseph Hooke =

Luke Joseph Hooke (born Dublin in 1716; died in Saint Cloud, near Paris, 16 April 1796) was a controversial Irish theologian, representing in Paris the "Catholicism of the Enlightenment". The laws of civil society should be so designed, he argued, to enable individuals to conform, through their own free will, to the natural rights ordained by God.

== Biography ==
Because of the Penal Laws which forbade Catholic education in Ireland, he was sent when young to Saint-Nicolas-du-Chardonnet, Paris, where he remained till he received the licentiate. He then entered the Sorbonne and graduated in 1736. In 1742 he was appointed to a chair of theology, and soon reportedly earned a high reputation for learning. On 18 November 1751, he presided at the defence of the thesis of Jean-Martin de Prades, which aroused violent protestations. Among other propositions, de Prades had advanced the notion that the origin of civil law is might, from which are derived all notions of just and of unjust, of good and evil; natural law is empirical; that revealed religion is only natural religion in its evolution; and that the healings attributed to Jesus Christ are doubtful miracles. Hooke claimed that he had not read the thesis, withdrew his signature, and demanded the condemnation of the propositions. De Prades was suspended by the faculty which publicly censured the syndic, the grand-maître, and Hooke, the three signatories. Cardinal de Tencin, visitor of the Sorbonne, in virtue of a lettre de cachet and of his own authority, deprived Hooke of his chair, 3 May 1752, and forced him to leave the Sorbonne.

In 1754 de Prades was pardoned by Benedict XIV, whereupon Hooke appealed to the cardinal and the papal secretary, but obtained only the recall of the lettre de cachet. Louis XV, however, granted him a pension. In 1762 he again presented himself for a chair and was appointed, in preference to a candidate of the Archbishop De Beaumont, who refused his sanction and withdrew his students from Hooke's lectures. In consequence Hooke addressed to him a letter (1763), pleading for more lenient treatment in view of the pardon granted to de Prades, and making a profession of faith on the points impugned in the thesis. The Sorbonne upheld him and appointed him one of the censors who condemned Rousseau's Emile: or, On Education.

Yet Hooke himself has been seen as "a representative of the Catholicism of the Enlightenment". Hooke proposed that laws (jus) should be designed so as to enable people to conform, of their own free will, to the natural rights (lex) ordained by God. In this, just polity and the true faith were one and the same.

As the archbishop was unyielding in the De Prades case, Hooke resigned his theological professorship and accepted the chair of Hebrew. Some years later he was made curator of the Mazarin library. He held this position till 1791, when the French Directory dismissed him for refusing to take the oath of the Civil Constitution of the Clergy. He then withdrew to Saint-Cloud where he died in 1796.

== Published works ==
Religionis naturalis et revelatæ principia (Paris, 1752) is Hooke's principal work. It was edited for the third time and annotated by his friend John Brewer (Paris, 1774). The 1913 Catholic Encyclopedia describes it as "regarded by some as the foundation of the modern practice of Christian apologetics". It is contained in Jacques Paul Migne's Cursus Theologiæ.

Other works by Hooke include:

- Lettre à Mgr. l'Archevêque de Paris (Paris, 1763)
- Discours et réflexions critiques sur l'histoire et le gouvernement de l'ancienne Rome (Paris, 1770–84), a translation of his father's history of Rome
- Mémoires du Maréchal de Berwick (Paris, 1778), which he edited with notes
- Principes sur la nature et l'essence du pouvoir de l'église (Paris, 1791)
