= William Brewer =

William Brewer may refer to:

- Billy Brewer (1935–2018), American football player and head coach
- Billy Brewer (baseball) (born 1968), retired Major League Baseball player
- Billy Brewer (footballer) (1893–1914), English footballer
- William Brewer (Illinois politician), 19th century Illinois state representative
- William Brewer (justice) (died 1226), administrator and justice in England
  - William Briwere (died 1244), his nephew, medieval bishop of Exeter
- William Brewer (MP) (1811–1881), British Member of Parliament for Colchester
- William Brewer (novelist), American novelist
- William Brewer (sheriff) (died 1817), Sheriff of Norfolk County, Massachusetts 1811 to 1812
- William A. Brewer III, American trial lawyer
- William D. Brewer (1922–2009), American diplomat
- William Henry Brewer (1828–1910), American botanist
- William J. Brewer (1843–1878), American soldier and Medal of Honor recipient
- William M. Brewer (died 1921), mayor of Omaha, Nebraska, 1873–1874
