= CJ Hamilton =

CJ Hamilton may refer to:

- Lord Claud Hamilton (1843–1925), Claud John Hamilton
- CJ Hamilton (footballer) (born 1995), English footballer
- C. J. Hamilton (author) (1841–1935), English author
