= Alexander Brewer =

English cricketer and soldier

Personal information
- Full name: Alexander Newton Brewer
- Born: 10 September 1906; Rochdale, Lancashire, England
- Died: 10 January 1984 (aged 77); Blackpool, Lancashire, England
- Batting: Unknown
- Bowling: Unknown

Domestic team information
- Years: Team
- 1939/40: Europeans

Career statistics
Competition	First-class
Matches	2
Runs scored	18
Batting average	4.50
100s/50s	–/–
Top score	10
Balls bowled	12
Wickets	0
Bowling average	–
5 wickets in innings	–
10 wickets in match	–
Best bowling	–
Catches/stumpings	–/–
- Source: ESPNcricinfo, 29 October 2023

Alexander Newton Brewer (10 September 1906 — 18 January 1984) was an English first-class cricketer and British Army officer.

Brewer was born at Rochdale in September 1906. He made his debut in first-class cricket whilst in British India for the Europeans against the Hindus at Bombay in the 1939–40 Bombay Pentangular. Brewer received an emergency commission in the British Indian Army during the Second World War, being appointed as a second lieutenant in June 1941. Following the war, he made a second appearance in first-class cricket for S. A. Shete's XI against A. A. Jasdenwala's XI at Bombay in November 1946. In his two first-class matches, he scored a total of 18 runs with a highest score of 10. Brewer died at Blackpool in January 1984.
