= James Brewer =

James Brewer may refer to:

- James Brewer (American football) (born 1987), American football offensive tackle
- James Norris Brewer (1777–1839), English topographer and novelist
- James Alexander Brewer (1818–1886), British naturalist, plant-collector and botanist
- James Alphege Brewer (1881–1946), British artist and etcher
- Jim Brewer (baseball) (1937–1987), American relief pitcher in Major League Baseball
- Jim Brewer (basketball) (born 1951), American NBA player
- Jim Brewer (blues musician) (1920–1988), American blues singer and guitarist
- Jim Brewer (pole vaulter), co-winner of the 1961 NCAA DI outdoor pole vault championship

== See also ==
- Jim Breuer (born 1967), American comedian
