= Richard Brewer =

Richard Brewer or Dick Brewer may refer to:

- Richard Brewer (soldier) (17th century), English army officer
- Richard M. Brewer (1850–1878), American cowboy and outlaw
- Richard B. Brewer (1951–2012), American businessman and executive
- Richard L. Brewer Jr. (1864–1947), Virginia politician
- Rick Brewer, New Brunswick businessman and politician
- Rick Brewer (academic) (born 1956), president of Louisiana College in Pineville, Louisiana
