= Myrexis =

American dormant biopharmaceutical company

- Formerly: Myriad Pharmaceuticals
- Type: Public Company
- Traded as: OTC Pink: /quote MYRX
- Industry: Pharmaceuticals
- Founded: 1999; 27 years ago
- Founder: Spinoff from Myriad Genetics
- Headquarters: Salt Lake City, United States
- Area served: Worldwide
- Key people: Richard B. Brewer (CEO 2012 - until his death)
- Products: Cancer drugs
- Website: myrexis.com

Myrexis is an American biopharmaceutical company based in Salt Lake City, Utah. It was focused on drug development in several areas of medicine, in particular cancer therapy and auto-immune diseases.

It was developing three main cancer therapy drugs, Azixa, MPC-3100, and MPC-9528. After the failure of its most promising drug Azixa, in 2012, the company stopped all clinical trails and research and planned to be liquidated. However, instead of liquidation, the company stopped all activity and distributed most of its assets to shareholders, but continued as an entity looking for new investments.

== History ==
The company was founded in 1999 as a spin-off from Myriad Genetics and was originally known as Myriad Pharmaceuticals.

Richard B. Brewer was its CEO from May 2012 until his death in August 2012.

In February 2012 the company announced they had suspended development activity on all of its clinical and preclinical programs and appointed an investment company Stifel Nicolaus Weisel to evaluate strategic alternatives. In November 2012, the board of Myrexis announced that it planned to put the company into liquidation subject to shareholder approval.

In January 2013, the board reversed its decision, cancelled the liquidation, declared a special cash distribution to shareholders and appointed Jonathan M. Couchman (chairman of Xstelos Holdings) as president and chief executive officer. The remaining members of the board then resigned.
