= Thomas Davidson Christie =

Thomas Davidson Christie (21 January 1843 – 25 May 1921) was an Irish-American Civil War veteran, and a missionary and educator in the Ottoman Empire from 1877 to 1920.

He was born in Sion Mills, County Tyrone, Ireland, the son of James and Eliza (Reid) Christie. He married Carmelite Sarah Brewer in 1872. His wife was related to David Josiah Brewer, Stephen Johnson Field (both US Supreme Court Justices) and David Dudley Field I. Their correspondence, diaries and papers are located at the Minnesota Historical Society.

== Early family life ==
James Christie, Thomas's father, left Dundee Scotland to work in the flax mills of Ireland. James' brothers, Alexander and William, emigrated in the 1840s to the United States where they worked as machinists. During the winter season they worked in Cuba, operating machines designed by Dudley Pray of Boston, that were used in the sugar cane fields. In 1846, they sent for Christie family in Ireland and their extended family in Dundee. Eventually all settled near each other in Clyman Township, Dodge County, Wisconsin.

Thomas's older brother, William Gilcrist Christie went to Minnesota. James sent Thomas there to help William with his farm.

== Civil War ==
In October 1861, Thomas and William enlisted at Fort Snelling MN in the 1st Minnesota Light Artillery Battery. They were in the "Hornet's Nest" in the Battle of Shiloh, the Siege of Vicksburg, and in 1864 joined Sherman's army for the Battle of Kennesaw Mountain. They participated in the Battle of Atlanta and Sherman's March to the Sea. Both Thomas and William wrote to their family during their service. Thomas mustered out in 1865. While serving as soldiers, the brothers paid for their sister Sarah-Jane to attend teacher training college; she eventually became superintendent of schools in Blue Earth County, Minnesota.

== College and seminaries ==
After his discharge he surveyed land for the Winona and St. Peter Railroad Company near Winona, MN. He also sold books for a time. In April 1866 he entered Beloit College and graduated in July 1871. He met his wife at Rockford Seminary for Women where she graduated in 1871. In August 1871 he started teaching at the University of Wisconsin-Madison. He married in March 1872 and returned to Beloit College in Sept 1872 to teach and to complete work on his master's degree, which he received in 1874. He went to Andover Theological Seminary for further studies and was ordained a minister in Beloit.

== Turkish period ==
In September 1877 he and his family were sent by the American Board of Commissioners for Foreign Missions to Turkey. He taught in Marash, Turkey at the Central Turkey Theological Seminary for 16 years. From 1881-82 the Christies were in Adana. In 1883 they moved to Tarsus, Turkey where he assumed the presidency of St. Paul's Institute. Dr. Christie secured an endowment from Elliott Fitch Shepard in 1885 for the college. At times Thomas was away from the college for extended periods (once for 4 years) and Carmelite acted on his behalf. Mrs Christie also taught English at the college.

The Christies provided refuge, relief and assistance to many Armenian and Turkish people in times of trouble and peace. They were in Turkey during the massacres of 1895, 1909 and the Armenian genocide in 1915. Thomas and Miner Rogers, his son-in-law, were at a gathering of ministers and missionaries at Adana in 1909. While assisting Armenian ministers, Miner was killed by Turkish irregulars. The Turkish irregulars left Adana, came to Tarsus and burned the Armenian quarter. Carmelite worked with the local Turkish government to protect the College. She opened the College to the Tarsus refugees and told the irregulars that it was American soil. This probably saved hundreds, if not thousands, of refugees from death. The irregular's suddenly left Tarsus and Thomas returned from Adana. Thomas was said to never be the same after these events. In 1915 he went to Constantinople to protest the treatment of Armenian teachers and was not allowed to return to Tarsus. Carmelite remained in Tarsus during World War I.

Thomas spent the Great War in America. He served as Chaplin at Camp Kearney in California. In January 1919 he sailed from Seattle to Hong Kong and Port Said to return to Tarsus. He arrived in April 1919 to a "royal reception", of friends of all classes and religions, French and Turkish officials and students.

His health was not good. He and Carmelite returned to the United States in July 1920 and lived in Southern California. Thomas and Carmelite are buried in the American Board of Commissioners for Foreign Mission's plot in the Walnut Street Cemetery, Newton Massachusetts.

== Children ==
Thomas and Carmelite had 7 children, 3 of whom did not reach their 35th birthday. Of the surviving four;

- Emerson Brewer Christie (1878–1967) was an ethnologist and linguist. For a time he taught English at St Paul’s Institute. He worked with the Subanon people of the Philippines Island. He worked for the State Department as a special assistant and was Chief of its Translation Bureau (1928–1944). He worked to mediated the "Chaco" boundary between Bolivia and Paraguay. He married Clara Pray, his cousin.
- Mary Phelps Christie (1881–1975) was an educator. After her first husband was killed in 1915, she married Dr. William Nute. The Nutes worked in Turkey in rural health and education.
- Jean Ogilvie Christie Lien (1891–1984) was an educator. She received a degree from Wellesley College, taught in Turkey, Occidental College and University of California at Berkeley with her husband.
- Paul Theodore Christie (1883–1959) was an educator. He received his degree from Harvard University and taught at St. George's School (Rhode Island). He married Miriam McLoud, granddaughter of Rev. Anson McLoud, a Congregational minister (1841–1869) of Topsfield Massachusetts.

== See also ==
- David Dudley Field I -
  - Eliza Field - daughter. Married Rev Josiah Brewer who was also a missionary in Turkey. Their son was David Joshia Brewer, a US Supreme Court Justice.
  - David Dudley Field II - son noted New York Lawyer
  - Stephen Johnson Field - another son of David Field and a US Supreme Court Justice who at 13 went with his sister to Turkey.

== External reference links ==
- Some Civil War letters of the Christie family online at MNHS.org
- Summary of Thomas Christie service by Beloit College
- Excerpt from: Beloit Daily News (May 28, 1921)
- Summary of Christie's life, Missionary Review of the World, January 1922, "Forty-three Years in Turkey: An Appreciation of Thomas Davidson Christie."
