= C. J. Harris =

C. J. Harris may refer to:

- C. J. Harris (singer) (1991–2023), American music artist and sixth-place finalist on American Idol's thirteenth season
- C. J. Harris (basketball) (born 1991), American basketball player
- C. J. Harris (American football) (born 2002), American football player
- Johnson Harris, native American politician
