= John Brewer (monk) =

John Brewer, D.D. (1744–1822), was an English Benedictine monk.

Brewer, who assumed in religion the Christian name of Bede, was born in 1744. In 1776 he was appointed to the mission at Bath. He built a new chapel in St. James's Parade in that city, and it was to have been opened on 11 June 1780, but the delegates from Lord George Gordon's 'No Popery' association so inflamed the fanaticism of the mob that on 9 June the edifice was demolished, as well as the presbytery in Bell-tree Lane. The registers, diocesan archives, and Bishop Walmesley's library and manuscripts perished in the flames; and Dr. Brewer had a narrow escape from the fury of the rioters. The ringleader was tried and executed, and Dr. Brewer recovered £3,736 damages from the hundred of Bath. In 1781 the duties of president of his brethren called Dr. Brewer away from Bath. Subsequently Woolton, near Liverpool, became his principal place of residence, and there he died on 18 April 1822.

He brought out the second edition of the Abbé Luke Joseph Hooke's 'Religio Naturalis et Revelata,' 3 vols., Paris, 1774, 8vo, to which he added several dissertations.
