= George E. Brewer =

American politician, historian, minister (1832-1922)

Reverend Captain George E. Brewer
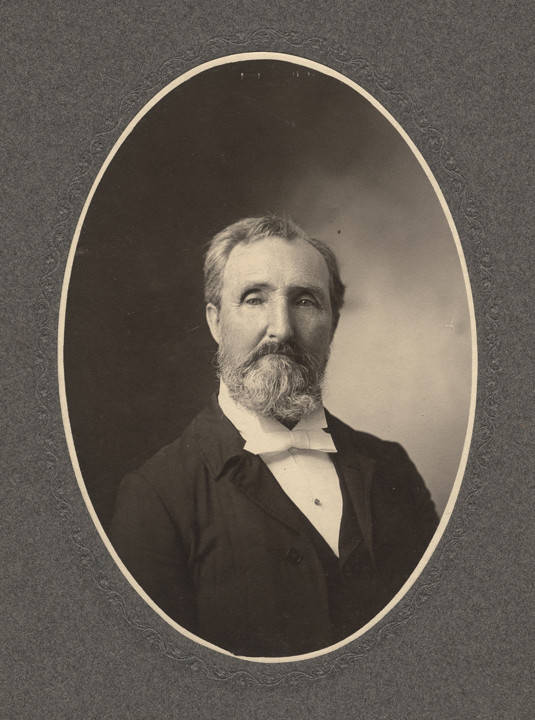

Adjutant General of Alabama
- In office 1866–1866
- Governor: Robert M. Patton

Member of the Alabama Senate, District 15 (Coosa County)
- In office 1859–1863
- Governor: Andrew B. Moore (1857–1861); John Gill Shorter (1861–1863)

Member of the Alabama House of Representatives, Coosa County
- In office 1857–1859
- Governor: Andrew B. Moore

Superintendent of Education, Coosa County
- In office 1856–1856
- Governor: John A. Winston

Personal details
- Born: October 31, 1832 Newton County, Georgia, US
- Died: January 23, 1922 (aged 89) Columbus, Georgia, US
- Spouse: Laura Ann Suttle (m. 1854; died 1914)
- Children: 8
- Education: Robinson Springs Academy, Elmore County, Alabama
- Profession: Historian, educator, legislator, minister
- Ordination: Elder Platt Stout, Missionary Baptist Church, October 1860

Military service
- Allegiance: Confederate States of America
- Branch/service: Confederate States Army
- Years of service: 1862–1865
- Rank: Captain
- Unit: Company A, 36th Alabama Infantry Regiment

The Reverend George Evans Brewer (October 31, 1832 – January 23, 1922) was an American historian, educator, legislator, and Baptist minister from the State of Alabama. He held office in the Alabama State Senate (1859–1863) and the Alabama House of Representatives (1857–1859), was elected to the office of Superintendent of Education of the County of Coosa, Alabama in 1856, and was appointed Adjutant General of Alabama by Governor Robert M. Patton in 1866.
