= Gage Brewer =

American musician

Gage Kelso Brewer (1904 in Gage, Oklahoma – 1985 in Wichita, Kansas) was an American musician, guitarist and bandleader. Brewer is credited with the first staging of a publicly promoted performance featuring the electric guitar, as well as the earliest recording using both the electric Hawaiian and electric Spanish guitar.

== Early career ==
Brewer played primarily in the Hawaiian style with the guitar, face up, across the lap, intonated with a bar rather than fretted by hand. When he was born in Gage, Oklahoma Territory, Hawaiian music featuring the guitar would gain important public exposure at the 1904 Saint Louis World's Fair. This music inspired musicians across the continent and eventually worldwide. Its influence on the music of the mainland would be profound through the mid 20th century.

By the age of 14 Brewer was entertaining the people of Shattuck, Oklahoma, giving lessons and working in the town's theater. In 1920 he traveled to California for the first of what would be many visits. There he studied with Victor Recording artist Sam P. Moore, who was a well-known artist of the Hawaiian Style Guitar. Moore was one of the earliest mainlanders to apply the Hawaiian Style of playing to more traditional American folk songs foreshadowing the instrument's prominence in country music. While in California, according to “Who’s Who in the World of Music – 1936”, Brewer also studied under Sol Hoʻopiʻi, Jack Miller, and D. S. Delano. Brewer's formal musical education continued when he returned to the mid-west and attended Northwestern Oklahoma Teachers College in Alva. At about this time Brewer also worked Vaudeville, Lyceum and Chautauqua circuits.

== Wichita and the electric guitar ==
By the mid-1920s Brewer had relocated to Wichita, Kansas, where he would establish his home base and work into the 1960s. From Wichita he began touring with his own orchestra and broadcasting on radio to further promote his work, becoming a well-traveled celebrity.

By the summer of 1932, Brewer went to Los Angeles to get the first available electric guitar from guitarist-inventor George Beauchamp—the A-25 "Frying Pan" (nicknamed for its combination of circular body and long neck resembling a frying pan). Brewer made the purchase September 21, 1932.

Returning to Wichita, Brewer announced, October 2, that he would be introducing the instrument (which he called the "Electro Steel Guitar") with his orchestra that month at the Shadowland Pavilion, a Wichita nightclub, which Brewer also owned. The first-ever known public performance with the A-25 was by Brewer on Halloween night, October 31, 1932, at the Shadowland.

Guitar.com says that audiences were unsure of what to make of it, some fearing that the performer could be electrocuted,. Brewer continued to promote the electric guitar throughout the area, through a series of Halloween Concerts.

== Legacy ==
Brewer's pioneering public performance of the electric guitar remains his most historic achievement, though that event's direct impact on the music industry is unclear.

Brewer never recorded a commercially released record, published a hit song or performed at any length as part of a nationally famous musical organization. His only known recording is a direct-to-disk 78 rpm record made in Denver, Colorado in the mid 1930s.

A 2009 short film, Electric Revolution: Gage Brewer—which debuted at Wichita’s Tallgrass Film Festival—documents Brewer's October, 1932 performance.
