= Johanna Brewer =

American developer

- Education: Boston University; University of California
- Scientific career
- Fields: Ubiquitous computing, Human-computer interaction
- Workplaces: Massachusetts Institute of Technology, Smith College

Johanna Brewer is a developer, designer, ethnographer and professor at Smith College. Brewer was a co-founder and CEO of Frestyl. In 2014, they started work on a tracking toolkit for home automation systems with a special focus on user privacy. In 2016, they founded a research and design studio called Neta Snook, focusing on the creation of technology that works towards a diverse society. In spring 2019, they started as a research associate and postdoctoral researcher at MIT. Their research areas include ubiquitous computing and human-computer interaction, social connectivity and how technology functions in society.

== Education ==
Johanna Brewer graduated with a B.A. in Computer Science and Philosophy and a Master's Degree in Computer Science from Boston University. They then acquired a PhD in Informatics and Computer Science at the University of California where they also worked as a staff researcher. One area of their research in this time focused on urban computing and mobility in urban spaces. They did ethnographic studies on inclusivity and diversity in the online gaming scene, as well as on public transportation, and helped create a new interface for a molecular simulator on the Swiss National Supercomputer. They also developed a real-time tracking system for radiation therapy at the Massachusetts General Hospital.

== Publications ==
- Brewer, Johanna, Dourish, Paul (2008): Storied spaces: Cultural accounts of mobility, technology, and environmental knowing. In International Journal of Human-Computer Studies, 20 (12) pp. 963–976.
- Bassoli, Arianna, Brewer, Johanna, Martin, Karen, Dourish, Paul, Mainwaring, Scott D. (2007): Underground Aesthetics: Rethinking Urban Computing. In IEEE Pervasive Computing, 6 (3) pp. 39–45.
- Dourish, Paul, Brewer, Johanna, Bell, Genevieve (2005): Information as a cultural category. In Interactions, 12 (4) pp. 31–33.
- Brewer, Johanna, Williams, Amanda, Dourish, Paul (2007): A handle on what\'s going on: combining tangible interfaces and ambient displays for colla. In: Proceedings of the 1st International Conference on Tangible and Embedded Interaction, 2007, pp. 3–10.
- Brewer, Johanna, Mainwaring, Scott, Dourish, Paul (2008): Aesthetic journeys. In: Proceedings of DIS08 Designing Interactive Systems, 2008, pp. 333–341.
- Brewer, Johanna, Williams, Amanda, Dourish, Paul (2007): A handle on what's going on: combining tangible interfaces and ambient displays for collab. In: Ullmer, Brygg, Schmidt, Albrecht (eds.) Proceedings of the 1st International Conference on Tangible and Embedded Interaction 2007, Baton Rouge, Louisiana, USA, February 15–17, 2007, 2007, pp. 3–10.
