= Alex Brewer =

Alex Brewer may refer to:

- Alex Brewer (artist) (born 1978), American artist
- Alex Brewer (politician), British politician, Liberal Democrat Member of Parliament for North East Hampshire since 2024
