= George Brewer (writer) =

English miscellaneous writer (born 1766)

George Brewer (born 1766) was an English miscellaneous writer.

== Life ==
Brewer was a son of John Brewer, well known as a connoisseur of art, and was born in 1766. In his youth he served as a midshipman under Lord Hugh Seymour, Rowland Cotton, and others, and visited America, India, China, and North Europe. In 1791 he was made a lieutenant in the Swedish navy. Afterwards abandoning the sea, he read for law in London, and established himself as an attorney.

The date of Brewer's death is not known. In his allusions to himself he speaks of having been "misplaced or displaced in life", of having had Vicissitude for his tutor, and of being luckless altogether.

== Works ==
He is believed to have written a novel, Tom Weston, when in the navy, but his first appeal to the public of which there is evidence was a comedy, How to be Happy acted at the Haymarket in August 1794. After three nights, "owing to the shaft of malevolence", this comedy was withdrawn, and was never printed. In 1795 Brewer wrote The Motto, or the History of Bill Woodcock; and he wrote Bannian Day, a musical entertainment in two acts, which was published and performed at the Haymarket in the same year for seven or eight nights, though but "a poor piece". In 1799 the Man in the Moon in one act, attributed to Brewer, was announced for the opening night of the season at the Haymarket, but its production was evaded, and it disappeared from the bills.

The next year (1800) Brewer published a pamphlet, The Rights of the Poor, dedicating it to "Men who have great power, by one without any" and this received copious notice in the Gentleman's Magazine (lxx. 1168 et seq.). He was writing at this time also in the European Magazine, among his contributions being Siamese Tales and Tales of the 12 Soubahs of Indostan; and some essays, announced as after the manner of Goldsmith, which were collected and published by subscription in 1806 as Hours of Leisure. In 1808 Brewer produced another two-volume tale, The Witch of Ravensworth, and at about the same time he published The Juvenile Lavater, stories for the young to illustrate Le Brun's "Passions", which bears no date, but of which there were two or more issues, with slightly varying title-pages. A periodical, The Town, attempted by Brewer after this, and stated by the authors of the Biographia Dramatica in 1812 to be "now publishing" would appear to have had but a short existence.

Another work, The Law of Creditor and Debtor, is set down in Biographia Dramatica, and in Allibone, as by Brewer; and Allibone gives in addition Maxims of Gallantry (1793), and states 1791 as the date of publication of Tom Weston but there is no trace of either of these works in the British Museum.
