= Robert Brewer =

Robert Brewer may refer to:

- Bobby Brewer (1963–2024), American pastor, author and talk radio personality
- Robert Brewer (figure skater) (born 1939), American figure skater
- Robert Brewer (American football), American football player
- Robert B. Brewer (1924–1996), U.S. Army officer
- Robert S. Brewer Jr. (born 1946), American attorney
