= Caroline Brewer =

British field hockey player

Caroline Brewer (born 21 December 1962) is a British former field hockey player who competed in the 1988 Summer Olympics. The team earned fourth place at the 1988 Summer Olympics.

A graduate of Loughborough University, Caroline qualified as a teacher and moved to Shropshire after marrying her husband, John. They have two daughters, Beth and Emma, and now live in Chesham, Bucks. Caroline now works at the London Foot and Ankle Centre at St John's Wood, London.
