= Thomas Brewer =

Thomas Brewer may refer to:

- Thomas Brewer (composer) (1611 – c.1660), English composer best known for introducing the glee form
- Thomas Brewer (writer) (fl. 1624), English writer
- Thomas Mayo Brewer (1814–1880), American naturalist
- Thomas Brewer (cricketer) (1868–?), English cricketer
- Thomas Brewer (activist) (1894–1956), American civil rights activist
- Thomas Bowman Brewer (1932–2018), sixth chancellor of East Carolina University
- Tom Brewer (1931–2018), American baseball player
- Tom Brewer (politician) (born 1958), American politician in the Nebraska Legislature
