= Jack Brewer (disambiguation) =

Jack Brewer (born 1979) is a former American football player.

Jack Brewer may also refer to:

- Jack Brewer (discus thrower) (1914–1993), British Olympic athlete
- Jack Brewer (baseball) (1918–2003), American baseball pitcher
- Jack Brewer (bishop) (1929–2000), Roman Catholic Bishop of Lancaster, England
- Jack Brewer (singer) (born 1958), American lead singer of the post-hardcore band Saccharine Trust

== See also ==
- John Brewer (disambiguation)
