= Anthony Brewer =

Anthony Brewer may refer to:

- Antony Brewer (fl.1655), English playwright
- Tony Brewer (born 1957), American Major League Baseball player in the 1984 season
- Cllr. Anthony Brewer (1945–2020), English Political Councillor for Sutton-In-Ashfield, Skegby
