= Abubhai Jasdenwala =

Abubhai Adamji Jasdenwala (born 24 June 1899 in Bombay – died on 15 September 1982 in Bombay) was a businessman and cricket administrator.

Jasdenwala was educated at the Bharda New High School and St. Xavier's College in Bombay. He was part of the committee that mooted the idea of the BCCI. He was the Vice President (1954–55), President (1957–58 - 1958–59) and Hon. Treasurer (1935-36 - 1936–37) of the Bombay Cricket Association.

Jasdenwala served as the honorary secretary of the Cricket Club of India (CCI) from 1937 to 1945 and turned around the finances of the struggling club. He was also the President of the CCI from 1950 to 1951 and again from 1964 to 1971 and the President of the Billiards Association in 1955.

Jasdenwala's death was due to a heart attack.
