= Mark Brewer (illustrator) =

American artist

- Born: United States
- Occupation: Graphic Designing
- Known for: Illustration

Mark Brewer is an American artist who works as an illustrator. He received the National Cartoonist Society Magazine Illustration Award for 2002, and was nominated for the same award in 2000. Mark's drawings have been reproduced in The Wall Street Journal, Wine & Spirits, Yankee Magazine, Major League Baseball, The New York Times and The Washington Post to name a few. His drawings have been on the cover of Newsweek, The American Conservative, Weekly Reader, Politics Magazine, Strategic Finance, and GolfStyles among others. Mark Brewer is the past President of the Pittsburgh Society Of Illustrators (2009-2014). He is the author and illustrator of Brewology, An Illustrated Dictionary for Beer Lovers (Skyhorse Publishing, 2015) and currently (2020) writes a column about craft beer for Tribune Publications titled, What's Brewing?. Mark's original works and prints are in private collections and have raised thousands of dollars for numerous charities.
