= Douglas Brewer =

Welsh experimental physicist (1925–2018)

Professor Douglas Forbes Brewer (22 May 1925 – 16 July 2018) was a Welsh experimental physicist at the University of Sussex, known for his work in cryogenics.
