= David Brewer =

David Brewer is the name of:

- David Brewer (broker) (1940–2023), Lord-Lieutenant of Greater London and Lord Mayor of London
- David J. Brewer (1837–1910), Associate Justice of the United States Supreme Court
- David L. Brewer III (born 1946), American school superintendent and retired Vice Admiral of the United States Navy
- David M. Brewer (1959–2003), American convicted of murder
- David V. Brewer (born 1951), Associate Justice of the Oregon Supreme Court

== See also ==
- John David Brewer (born 1951), English sociologist
