= Lynn Brewer =

American businesswoman

Lynn Brewer, known as Eddie Lynn Morgan before her marriage, is the author of the book Confessions of an Enron Executive: A Whistleblower's Story. She is also the founder of the Integrity Institute which provides analytical research and education in the area of "structural integrity," and she speaks at conferences or similar events for honorarium of $13,500 or more.

== Career at Enron ==
In 1998, Brewer was hired as a senior specialist at Enron. Her job at Enron was to head up a team that examined natural gas and power contracts, and write brief summaries for managers. Brewer was a regular speaker at universities, where she lectured students on the importance of ethics in business. She provided the keynote address at the Sarbanes-Oxley conference hosted by the New York Stock Exchange in 2003. Brewer co-authored an article in Business Strategy Review with noted management expert Oren Harari on leadership.

== Dispute about whistleblower claim ==
A USA Today article by Greg Farrell, based on interviews with two dozen former colleagues, found that her claim to be a former Enron Executive and as the first whistleblower at Enron could not be substantiated. Her former colleagues described her claim as exaggerated. Former Enron employees claimed that she mainly did clerical work at Enron, and lost her job after failing to complete an assignment to teach a workshop in London. According to USA Today, Brewer took advantage of her similarity to a real whistle-blower at Enron, Sherron Watkins. Brewer said that "...we'd hope that all the time we're confused with her (Sherron Watkins)."

In her defense, Brewer claimed that she headed up a contract briefing team, she controlled more than $1 million in salaries and overall budget, therefore, she considered herself an executive. Brewer stated that she was out speaking publicly about Enron well before Watkins was ever on the cover of Time magazine.

Lynn Brewer told Puget Sound Business Journal she would ask USA Today for an apology for the 12 October 2007 article that questioned her claim to be an Enron whistle-blower, and that otherwise she would take her complaint to the Washington News Council, an organization that handles media disputes.

== Books published ==
- Brewer, Lynn, Robert Chandler, and O.C. Ferrell, "Managing Risks for Corporate Integrity: How to Survive An Ethical Misconduct Disaster," South-Western Educational Publishing, March 14, 2006, pp. 320, ISBN 978-0-324-20351-6.
- Brewer, Lynn, and Matthew Scott Hansen "Confessions of an Enron Executive: A Whistleblower's Story," AuthorHouse, October 8, 2004, pp. 432, ISBN 978-1-4184-8536-8
