= James Alexander Brewer =

James Alexander Brewer (25 February 1818 – 10 January 1886) was a naturalist, plant-collector, botanist, a writer of local floras, a beetle-collector, and a postmaster in the British Post Office. He was a member of the Botanical Society of London, a member of the Linnean Society of London, and the first honorary secretary of the 'Holmesdale Natural History Club' in Reigate, in the Vale of Homesdale.

In 1856 he published a New flora of the neighborhood of Reigate, Surrey, and in 1861 he was asked by the 'Holmesdale Natural History Club' to edit for publication the manuscript of John Drew Salmons on the Flora of Surrey.

Brewer was elected a Fellow of the Linnean Society of London in 1856.

He collected plants and insects in Great Britain and Australia.

Brewer died on 10 January 1886 in Tonbridge, Kent.

The standard author abbreviation Brewer is used to indicate this person as the author when citing a botanical name.

== Bibliography ==
- Brewer, James Alexander (1856). A new flora of the neighbourhood of Reigate, Surrey: Containing the flowering plants and ferns of the district, with their localities, times of flowering, etc. and a list of the mosses : to which is added an appendix containing lists of the fauna, in the following orders - mammalia or quadrupeds, birds, reptiles, fishes, coleoptera, and lepidoptera. London: William Pamplin. OCLC 8922834 (all editions).
- Salmon, J.D.; Brewer, James Alexander (1863). Flora of Surrey, or, A catalogue of the flowering plants and ferns found in the county: With the localities of the rarer species, from the manuscripts of the late J.D. Salmon and from other sources (PDF). London: Van Voorst. OCLC 15199267 (all editions).
