= Elisabeth Brewer =

American nurse and loyalist

Elisabeth Brewer was a nurse and loyalist in the American Revolutionary War who was captured and imprisoned for intelligence gathering activities.

== Wartime activities ==
Brewer lived in New Brunswick, New Jersey, a British stronghold during the war. When stopped by General Israel Putnam's forces on her way out of the town in April 1777, she gave testimony about three supposed loyalist agents. Putnam apparently believed her to be trustworthy and decided to employ her as a nurse, writing to Governor William Livingston:

She has an Inclination of entering the Hospital as a Nurse; in which employment she has been before employ'd at this place, and the Surgeon giving her a good Character, I have that purpose to detain her here for that purpose—If you have any Objections and will let me know, I will send her Immediately to you.

However, Brewer was in fact posing as a defector to gain access to the Continental Army encampment. After serving as a nurse for two months, she was apprehended and found guilty of espionage. She was sentenced to spend the rest of the war under house arrest in Philadelphia.
