= Lloyd Brewer =

Australian rules footballer

Personal information
- Full name: Lloyd Brewer
- Born: 21 February 1929
- Died: 29 November 2003 (aged 74)
- Original team: Yallourn
- Height: 193 cm (6 ft 4 in)
- Weight: 94 kg (207 lb)

Playing career^{1}
Years	Club	Games (Goals)
1953	Richmond	3 (1)
- ^{1} Playing statistics correct to the end of 1953.

Lloyd Brewer (21 February 1929 – 29 November 2003) was a former Australian rules footballer who played with Richmond in the Victorian Football League (VFL).
