= Gurley Brewer =

Gurley Brewer (1866–1919).

Gurley Brewer (1866–1919) was an American attorney, newspaper publisher, and political activist. Brewer is best remembered as the editor of the Indianapolis World, one of the first African American newspapers in the state of Indiana.

== Biography ==
=== Early years ===
Gurley Brewer was born in Indianapolis, Indiana in 1866, the son of Edward Brewer, a barber, and his wife. Mary. The family moved to the town of Vincennes when Gurley was a small boy.

Brewer was a graduate of Wilberforce University, a historically black college affiliated with the African Methodist Episcopal Church, located in Wilberforce, Ohio. He graduated with honors in 1888.

=== Career ===
A talented public speaker, in 1888 Brewer toured the state of Indiana on behalf of Republican Presidential candidate Benjamin Harrison at the request of the Indiana Republican State Central Committee. Brewer would regularly speak on behalf of the Republican Party during political campaign season for the rest of his life.

Brewer was admitted to the Indiana state bar as a practicing attorney in February 1890, becoming the first African-American man ever admitted to bar in Southern Indiana. He opened up a practice in his hometown of Vincennes.

Brewer also served as the principal of the segregated "colored schools" of Mt. Vernon, Indiana from 1894 to 1897.

In 1900 Brewer was named Deputy State Historian of Indiana. He was also a Deputy State Statistician in that year and was elected an alternate delegate to the 1900 Republican National Convention.

From the first years of the 20th Century Brewer was editor of the Indianapolis World, one of the first black newspapers in the state of Indiana. Brewer frequently took a conservative editorial line, in editorializing in 1903 in favor of the Negro Business League, a group formed in Indianapolis to remove disaffected and unemployed blacks from the community, with a view to assuaging troubled race relations. In July 1903 Brewer publicly declared:

It is very easy to determine who the shiftless, worthless negroes are, for they are found almost altogether in the Indiana Avenue district. Agents of the Negro Business League will make inquiry concerning them, and those who will not work will be reported to the authorities with a request that they be driven out of town.

Brewer became co-publisher of the World with Alexander Manning in 1904, remaining at the helm until 1912. In this capacity he was active in the National Negro Press Association, of which he was elected Second Vice President in 1913.

A staunch supporter of the Republican Party, Brewer backed the conservative William Howard Taft in the controversial 1912 election against the progressive campaign of former Republican President Theodore Roosevelt.

Early in 1919 Brewer was named Indiana Deputy State Oil Inspector.

=== Death and legacy ===
Gurley Brewer died at his home in Indianapolis of a heart attack on March 30, 1919. He was 53 years old at the time of his death.

A memorial service was held for Brewer on April 4, 1919, a gathering addressed by prominent Republicans including Indiana Governor James P. Goodrich and Indianapolis Mayor Charles W. Jewett.
