= Rhett Brewer =

British musician

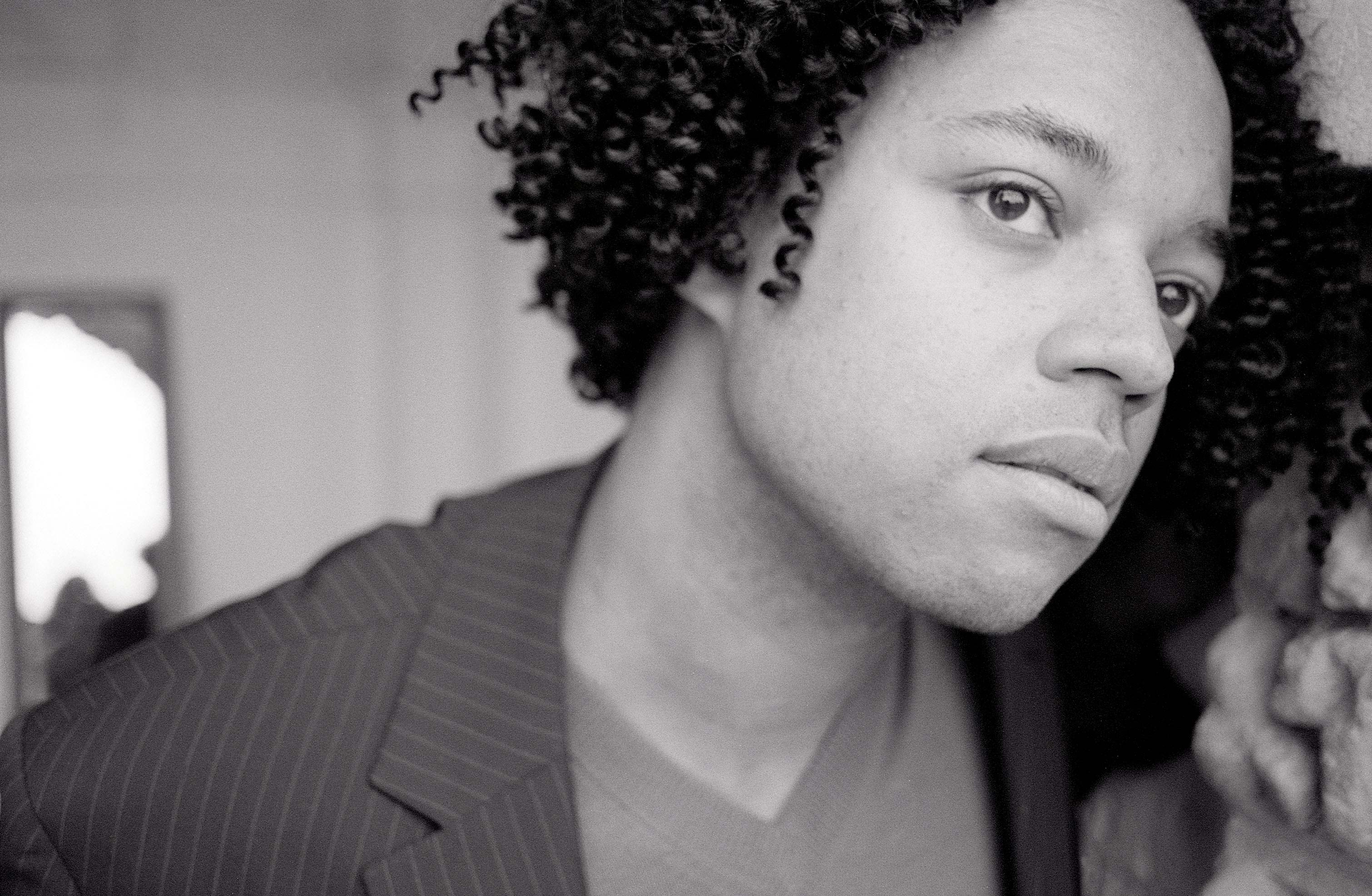
Rhett Brewer

Rhett Brewer is a British-based composer and singer whose career began with the release of the collaborative album These Wings Without Feathers with Lisa Gerrard, and has since become a regular composer for film. In 2006, Brewer began the new project Hotel de Ville, which resulted in an album of the same name. He is best known for his mix of Classical music with music of Non-Western origin and Electronic elements, as well as the use of his own original voice as an instrument.

== Early life ==
Born in New York City, Brewer was surrounded by music from the streets. Russian music and music from the Middle East and Klezmer, all blended with jazz and the classical work he studied as a pianist and childhood vocalist in his local Catholic church. Inspired by all these sound worlds, and by the liturgical atmosphere of the church, he began carving out a distinctive sound.

== Career ==
=== Ronan Quays ===
Brewer was plucked from obscurity with the collaborative album These Wings Without Feathers originally released in 1996 by the De Nova Da Capo label and World Serpent. Subsequently, Brewer's debut album The Ebbing Wings of Wisdom was released under the project title Ronan Quays, and later under his own name to critical acclaim. BBC Presenter Charlie Gillett introduced listeners throughout the UK to Brewer's music, and as a result work developed for Brewer to compose for film.

== Film work ==
Brewer began working for media with the BBC production Keeping the Feast in 2000. Since then, he has regularly composed and contributed music for film and television internationally. His scores have included music for Crossing Borders, a documentary by German filmmaker Arnd Wächter, The Lot, by American director Kevin Watson, music for the Touchstone Television Production The Path to 9/11, a documentary about the blind Frisian poet Tsjêbbe Hettinga by Dutch Director Pieter Verhoeff, and the short film Together by Eicke Bettinga.

== Hotel de Ville ==
In 2006, Brewer began a new solo project entitled Hotel de Ville. Recorded entirely by Brewer, the music was inspired by his work in film, and is focused on a cinematic narrative of music as a place. Fusing elements of 60's French pop, classical and electronic percussion, Brewer recorded all the music at 60 BPM, which is the same as that of the human heart. Tracks from the album have been used for various films, and the song Full Circle was selected in 2006 by the Italian company Fernet Branca for their current television advertising campaign.

Brewer is currently recording a follow-up album to Hotel de Ville, tentatively entitled The View From Afar with fellow composers Dov Waterman and Tim Saul.

== Discography ==
- These Wings Without Feathers (1996)
- The Ebbing Wings of Wisdom (1996)
- Hotel de Ville (2006)
- Map of the Human Heart (2007)
- Stay in the Box (2007) – Compilation album.
- Breath of Stars (2007) – Compilation album by Auralgasms.

== Film scores and contributions ==
- The Path to 9/11 2006
- The Lot 2005
- Sleepwalker 2005
- Peacewalker 2006
- Tsjêbbe Hettinga 2006
- Every Picture 2006
- Chrysalides 2008
- Gene Generation 2007
- Victory Day 2007
- Romany 2007
- Amours Voilees 2006
- Homeworld2 – Videogame 2003
- Anatomy of Violence 2007
- Together 2009
