= C. J. Henderson =

C. J. Henderson may refer to:

- C. J. Henderson (writer) (1951–2014), American writer
- C. J. Henderson (American football) (born 1998), American football cornerback
- CJ Henderson, member of the American Celtic music group Wicked Tinkers
