= Mike Brewer (disambiguation) =

Mike Brewer (born 1964) is a British presenter of motoring television programmes.

Mike Brewer also may refer to:

- Mike Brewer (musician) (1944–2024), American musician with duo Brewer & Shipley
- Mike Brewer (baseball) (born 1959), former Major League Baseball right fielder
- Mike Brewer (rugby union) (born 1964), former New Zealand rugby union footballer
- Mike Brewer (ice hockey) (born 1969), Canadian ice hockey player and coach
- Michael Brewer (born 1992), American football quarterback
- Michael C. Brewer (born 1945), musical director of the National Youth Choirs of Great Britain
