= O. H. P. Brewer =

Cherokee politician (died 1891)

Justice of the Cherokee Nation Supreme Court

Personal details
- Born: Georgia, U.S.
- Died: December 20, 1891 Cherokee Nation, Indian Territory, U.S.
- Citizenship: Cherokee Nation
- Children: O. H. P. Brewer Jr.

Military service
- Allegiance: Confederate States
- Branch/service: Confederate Army
- Rank: Colonel

O. H. P. Brewer was a Cherokee politician who served on the Cherokee Nation Supreme Court and on the Cherokee Nation National Council. He served in the Confederate Army during the American Civil War and his son O. H. P. Brewer Jr. was a member of the Oklahoma Constitutional Convention.

== Biography ==
O. H. P. Brewer was born in Georgia and relocated to Indian Territory in 1838. He attended Cherokee Nation public schools and Mount Comfort, a private school near Fayetteville, Arkansas. He married Delia A. Vann and their child O. H. P. Brewer Jr. was a member of the Oklahoma Constitutional Convention. He was a colonel in the Cherokee regiment of the Confederate Army during the American Civil War. After the war, he served on the Cherokee Nation National Council, on the Cherokee Nation Board of Education, and as a Cherokee Nation tax collector. He was serving on the Cherokee Nation Supreme Court at the time of his death on December 20, 1891.
