= Aaron Brewer =

Aaron Brewer may refer to:

- Aaron Brewer (long snapper) (born 1990), American football player for the Arizona Cardinals
- Aaron Brewer (offensive lineman) (born 1997), American football player for the Miami Dolphins
