= Tina Williams Brewer =

American artist

- Born: Huntington, West Virginia
- Education: Columbus College of Art and Design
- Known for: Quilts
- Website: tinawilliamsbrewer.com

Tina Williams Brewer is an American quilting artist, recognized for story quilts about African American history. Brewer was born in Huntington, West Virginia. She graduated from the Columbus College of Art and Design. Brewer started in interior design and pottery, but began quilting in 1986, feeling it was more compatible with motherhood. She is currently based in Pittsburgh, PA and has served on the boards of the Associated Artists of Pittsburgh and Pittsburgh Filmmakers/Pittsburgh Center for the Arts.

== Career ==
Brewers weaves symbolism into her works to tell stories focusing on issues of family, women, and children, the spirituality of the African American culture, and her personal experiences associated with them. Much of her older works focused on the Middle Passage and her ancestors arriving to America on slave ships, but she also focuses on African American contributions to history and society, such as Jazz.

Brewer works in artistic community outreach, using her insight to encourage others in the creative and collaborative process. She mentors aspiring artists of all ages and has brought the quilting experience to hundreds of individuals in schools and residency programs. She volunteers and works in several arts guilds and is sought after for workshops and lectures.

Brewer's quilts have been featured in collections such as those of the African American Museum, Dallas, the State Museum of Pennsylvania, Harrisburg, and The National Afro-American Museum and Cultural Center, Wilberforce, Ohio. Her quilts have been exhibited internationally via the "Art in Embassies" program of the U.S. Department of State. Her quilts are displayed at the U.S. Embassy in Ghana. Her work was included in that program's exhibitions in Accra (2003), Khartoum (2009), and Dhaka (2011). Brewer describes her design process as using the mandala concept. Friday, June 12, 2009, was proclaimed "Tina Willilams Brewer Day" by Pittsburgh City Council.

== Personal life ==
Brewer lives in Pittsburgh, Pennsylvania, with her husband, John Brewer. She has two children, John Emery and Kristine, and four grandchildren.

== Works ==
The harvest, 1989

Migration blues, 1998

Formation, 2002

Rising from the thicket, 2014

#1 of this place, 2016

Whirling dance and the unconscious rhythm

== Awards ==
- 2008 Award for Service to the Arts
- 2009 Volunteer in the Arts
- Lifetime Achievement Artist, Pittsburgh Center for the Arts (2009)

== Exhibitions ==
Her work has been displayed in more than 50 major venues in the United States, some of which include:

- Tampa Museum of Art and Science, Tampa, FL
- Heinz Regional History Center, Pittsburgh, PA
- Evansville Museum of Arts, Evansville, IN
- African American Museum, Philadelphia, PA
- African American Museum, Dallas, TX
- Reginald Lewis Museum of African American Art in Baltimore, MD
- Huntington Museum of Art, Huntington, WV
