= Trey Brewer =

American bodybuilder

William Trey Brewer (born 1985) is a former American amateur bodybuilder who competed in the NPC Super-Heavyweight division. After having received a formidable marketing contract from the supplement company: Bio-Engineered Supplements and Nutrition, Inc. (BSN), the bodybuilding and supplement industry's expectations quickly grew for the aspiring young athlete. However, after a disappointing 2009 season, BSN parted ways with Trey Brewer. Since 2010 he has bowed out of competitive bodybuilding and is said to be pursuing a career in firefighting as well as working as a personal trainer for Titanz Fitness in Smyrna, GA.

Brewer was born July 24, 1985, in Atlanta, Georgia.

== Competitive stats ==
- Height: 5 ft 11 in (180 cm)
- Competition weight: 225-242 lbs
- Off-Season weight: 315-355 lbs

== Competitive placings ==
- 2005 NPC Teen & Collegiate National Championships - 3rd
- 2006 NPC Excalibur - Overall Champion
- 2008 NPC Junior National Championships - 5th
- 2008 NPC National Championships - 4th
- 2009 NPC National Championships - 8th

== See also ==
- List of male professional bodybuilders
- List of female professional bodybuilders
- Trey Brewer Videos
