= Maura Brewer =

American performance artist

Maura Brewer is a contemporary artist who works in video and performance, whose work often draws on feminist discourse, critical and social theory and mainstream media. Originally from Upstate New York, she now lives and works in Los Angeles, CA. Brewer received her MFA at the School of the Art Institute in Chicago, IL in 2006 and her BFA in studio art from the University of California Irvine in 2011. In 2015 she completed the Whitney Independent Study Program through the Whitney Museum in New York City. She is widely known for her co-foundation of The Rational Dress Society and their project JUMPSUIT, with Abigail Glaum-Lathbury. She has also received attention for her work that considers the popular American movies starring Jessica Chastain, Zero Dark Thirty and Interstellar. Brewer's work has shown at The Bakery in Brooklyn, NY and Temporary Agency, in Ridgewood, Queens, and in several spaces in Los Angeles, including Human Resources, LA Municipal Art Gallery, and at University of California Irvine and the Contemporary Arts Center Gallery in Irvine. She has shown internationally at the Museum Moderner Kunst Stiftung Ludwig Wien in Vienna and the Folk Art Museum at the Xiangshan Campus of China Academy of Art in Hangzhou, China.
