= John Brewer (rugby league) =

Australian rugby league footballer

Johnny Brewer
Personal information
- Full name: Johnny Brewer
- Born: 14 February 1972 (age 54)

Playing information
- Position: Halfback, Five-eighth
Club
Years	Team	Pld	T	G	FG	P
1995	Parramatta Eels	5	0	0	0	0
1996–97	Halifax Blue Sox	7	2	0	0	8
	Total	12	2	0	0	8
- Source: As of 14 February 2023

Johnny Brewer is an Australian former professional rugby league footballer who played in the 1990s. He played for Parramatta in the ARL competition. He also played for Halifax in the Super League.

== Playing career ==
Brewer made his first-grade debut for Parramatta in round 1 of the 1995 ARL season against Penrith at Penrith Stadium. Brewer played five times for Parramatta throughout the season as the club finished second last winning only three matches for the entire year. The 1995 season is statistically Parramatta's worst ever season since their foundation in 1947. In 1996, Brewer joined English side Halifax and played a total of seven games for them in the Super League and Challenge Cup competitions.
