= Cangjie (disambiguation) =

Cangjie may refer to:

- Cangjie
- Cangjie input method
- Cangjiepian
- Cangjie (programming language)
- Cangjie, track on 2011 Mayday album Second Round
