= C. J. Sanders (surveyor) =

Charles James Sanders (1846 – 28 November 1923) was a South Australian surveyor.

== History ==
Sanders was born in Launceston, Van Diemen's Land to Charles Sanders (1821 – 11 March 1896), a well-known builder, who moved with his family to Adelaide in 1849, and was closely associated with Charles Farr. He was educated at James Bath's school, followed by Whinham College in North Adelaide and St Peter's College, where he won several scholarships.

He joined the Survey Department as a junion draftsman in January 1862, and served as assistant to George Goyder in 1865 and 1866. In 1867 he was engaged in drainage works in the South East, and railway feasibility studies. In 1868 he was appointed draftsman for the Central Road Board, and in 1870 was made Chief Registrar of the Land Office, a post he retained until 1882, when he retired and went into partnership with John Harrison Packard (1847 – 11 August 1929), a member of Goyder's expedition to Darwin, 1869, and who married a daughter of John Whinham. . Sanders was one of the founders of the South Australian Institute of Surveyors, and its first secretary, then succeeded Sir Charles Todd as President, holding the position for three years 1899–1901. He was a longtime member of the Institute council, and for 36 years was the Institute's representative on the Board of Examiners for Surveyors. He served as part-time lecturer on surveying at the University of Adelaide and the School of Mines until 1905, when a permanent lecturer was appointed. He was a licensed surveyor for Victoria and New South Wales, as well as being a Justice of the Peace for both those States.

He was a chorister, foundation member of the congregation and lay reader of Christ Church, North Adelaide, and served as the Church's visitor to the Adelaide Hospital, and for many years represented Christ Church on the Anglican Synod. He was an opponent of ritualism in the Church of England, and submitted many letters to The Register on the subject.

He was in 1885 a founding member of the South Australian chapter of the Royal Geographical Society of Australasia.

== Family ==
Sanders married Mary Eliza Holdernesse (died 1939) on 29 June 1870; they had no children, and lived on Jeffcott Street, North Adelaide.
