= O. H. P. Brewer Jr. =

American and Cherokee politician (1871–1951)

Personal details
- Born: 1871 Webbers Falls, Cherokee Nation, Indian Territory, U.S.
- Died: 1951 (aged 79–80)
- Parent: O. H. P. Brewer (father)
- Education: University of Arkansas

O. H. P. Brewer Jr. was an American and Cherokee politician who served in the Cherokee Nation Senate and was a member of the Oklahoma Constitutional Convention. He was inducted into the Oklahoma Hall of Fame in 1939.

== Early life and education ==
O. H. P. Brewer Jr. was born to O. H. P. Brewer and Delia A. Vann in Webbers Falls, Cherokee Nation, Indian Territory, in 1871. He attended the Cherokee National Male Seminary and graduated from the University of Arkansas.

== Career ==
He was elected to the Cherokee Nation Senate from the Canadian District. After his term, he was appointed the Cherokee Nation Board of Education by the Cherokee Nation National Council. He represented the 77th district at the Oklahoma Constitutional Convention and chaired the committee on education. He used his influence to include provisions segregating schools and requiring public education in the Oklahoma Constitution.

He worked for various departments of Oklahoma state government between 1908 and 1910 before managing Robert L. Owen's 1912 reelection campaign. He was appointed postmaster of Muskogee, Oklahoma, on May 7, 1913, by President Woodrow Wilson.

== Death and legacy ==
He was admitted to the Oklahoma Hall of Fame in 1939, and died in 1951.
