= Charley Brewer =

Charley Brewer may refer to:

- Charley Brewer (fullback) (1873–1958), Harvard fullback 1892–1895
- Charles Brewer (American football), Texas quarterback 1953–1955
- Charlie Brewer (born 1998), American football quarterback

== See also ==
- Charles Brewer (disambiguation)
