= Billy Brewer (footballer) =

English footballer

Personal information
- Birth name: William Arthur Brewer
- Date of birth: 19 May 1893
- Place of birth: Chippenham, England
- Date of death: 13 November 1914 (aged 21)
- Place of death: Hooge, Belgium
- Position(s): Centre forward

Senior career*
Years	Team	Apps	(Gls)
–1913	Chippenham Town		
1913–1914	Swindon Town	1	(0)
- Chippenham Town
- * Club domestic league appearances and goals

William Arthur Brewer (19 May 1893 – 13 November 1914) was an English professional footballer who played as a centre forward in the Southern League for Swindon Town. He captained Chippenham Town in non-League football.

== Personal life ==
Prior to the First World War, Brewer worked as a woollen cloth weaver and served in the Territorial Force for three years. On 1 September 1914, a week after the outbreak of the First World War, he re-enlisted in the Wiltshire Regiment in Devizes as a private. While serving with D Company of the 1st Battalion, Brewer was killed in action at Hooge on 13 November 1914. His body was never recovered and he is commemorated on the Menin Gate.

== Career statistics ==
Appearances and goals by club, season and competition
Club	Season	League			FA Cup		Total	
Club	Season	Division	Apps	Goals	Apps	Goals	Apps	Goals
Swindon Town	1913–14	Southern League First Division	1	0	0	0	1	0
Career total			1	0	0	0	1	0

== See also ==
- List of people who disappeared mysteriously: pre-1970
