= C. J. Brewer =

C. J. Brewer may refer to:

- C. J. Brewer (defensive lineman) (born 1997), American football player
- C. J. Brewer (wide receiver) (born 1982), American football player
