= Charles Brewer (businessman) =

American entrepreneur

Charles Brewer (born 1958) is an American entrepreneur.

Charles Brewer is the founder of MindSpring Enterprises, an American Internet service provider, Green Street Properties, a real estate development company, and Las Catalinas, a resort town in Costa Rica. He serves on the board of directors of the Midtown (Atlanta) Alliance, the Atlanta Commerce Club, and he serves on the board of councilors of the Carter Center. He and his wife Ginny reside in Atlanta with their family.

Born and raised in Louisville, Kentucky, he graduated from high school at Kentucky Country Day School and later graduated Phi Beta Kappa from Amherst College with a degree in economics, and received his MBA from the Stanford University Graduate School of Business. After a frustrating experience trying to set up an Internet account, Charles decided to start his own ISP. He founded MindSpring Enterprises in 1994. MindSpring grew to be one of the largest national ISPs, and eventually merged with EarthLink on February 4, 2000. Frustrated with the direction taken by the company after the merger, Charles soon left the company and sold his stock holdings.

On June 14, 2001, Charles announced the formation of Green Street Properties. Green Street's focus is on developing residential communities in the New Urbanist style, and its first project in Glenwood Park opened on June 18, 2005. In August 2006 Charles and partners purchased the Las Catalinas property in Guanacaste, Costa Rica and began plans for the development of a compact, walkable beach town there. Charles withdrew from Green Street Properties at the beginning of 2008 in order to focus on Las Catalinas. Construction began at Las Catalinas in late 2009.

Charles Brewer said in a panel discussion that he is interested in running a company again in Atlanta specifically on March 19, 2015. He was speaking with Michael Tavani, the co-founder of Atlanta coupon app, Scoutmob, during a live version of Tavani's leadership series of podcast's called On Doers. The event was hosted at General Assembly Atlanta in Ponce City Market.
