= J. Mason Brewer =

American folklorist, scholar and writer

- Born: John Mason Brewer; March 24, 1896; Goliad, Texas
- Died: January 24, 1975 (aged 78)
- Education: Wiley College; Indiana University Bloomington
- Occupation: Folklorist

John Mason Brewer (March 24, 1896 – January 24, 1975) was an American folklorist, scholar, and writer noted for his work on African-American folklore in Texas. He studied at Wiley College in Marshall, Texas, and Indiana University Bloomington, while he taught at Samuel Huston College in Austin, Texas, Booker T. Washington High School in Dallas, Claflin College in Orangeburg, South Carolina, Texas Southern University in Houston, Livingstone College in Salisbury, North Carolina, and East Texas State University in Commerce, Texas (now Texas A&M University–Commerce). He published numerous collections of folklore and poetry, most notably The Word on the Brazos (1953), Aunt Dicey Tales (1956), Dog Ghosts and Other Texas Negro Folk Tales (1958), and Worser Days and Better Times (1965).

Brewer was the first African American to be an active member of the Texas Folklore Society, to be a member of the Texas Institute of Letters, and to serve on the council of the American Folklore Society. He was also the first African American to deliver a lecture series at the University of Arizona, the University of California, and the University of Colorado, and he broke the color barrier at Austin's Driskill Hotel. He has been compared to Zora Neale Hurston, Joel Chandler Harris, and Alain Locke. He also published a book on African American legislators in Texas during the Reconstruction era up until their disenfranchisement.

== Early life ==
J. Mason Brewer was born on March 24, 1896, in Goliad, Texas. His mother, Minnie T. Brewer, was a public school teacher; his father, J. H. Brewer, worked a variety of jobs, including as a barber, drover, grocer, mail carrier, postmaster, and wagoner. Brewer's four sisters (Gladys, Jewell, Marguerite, and Stella) all became educators (working in Atlanta, Austin, and Houston), while his only brother (Claude) became an interior decorator in Austin. Brewer's father told him Texas stories as a child, while his mother provided him with access to books on African-American history as well as the works of Paul Laurence Dunbar. According to James W. Byrd, as a child Brewer was an "avid listener" who became an "avid reader" and ultimately also an "avid writer". Bruce A. Glasrud and Milton S. Jordan particularly credit his father for Brewer's interest in folklore.

Brewer attended public schools in Austin and Fannin, and graduated from high school in 1913 at the age of 17. He then attended Wiley College in Marshall, graduating with a Bachelor of Arts in English in 1917. Following this, he taught for a year in Austin before joining the American Expeditionary Forces in 1918, serving as a corporal in France, where he worked as an interpreter due to his knowledge of French, Italian, and Spanish. In 1919, Brewer returned from Europe to teach and serve as a principal in Fort Worth, working there in the public schools for five years. In 1924, Brewer moved to Denver to work briefly for the Continental Oil Company. While in Denver, he wrote both poetry and stories for his employer's trade journal as well as for The Negro American. He returned to teaching as a principal in Shreveport, Louisiana, and in 1926 earned a position as a professor at Samuel Huston College in Austin. In the 1930s, he taught English and Spanish at Booker T. Washington High School in Dallas.

== Early career ==
In 1932, while in Austin, Brewer met J. Frank Dobie, then the secretary and editor of the Texas Folklore Society. According to Byrd, Dobie was the "biggest influence on [Brewer's] career as a writer". Also in 1932, the Society published a collection of African-American folktales collected by Brewer that was entitled "Juneteenth". He studied folklore formally for the first time at Indiana University Bloomington, under the direction of Stith Thompson, ultimately earning his Master of Arts degree there in 1933. That same year, he published Negrito: Negro Dialect Poems of the Southwest. In 1936, he wrote The Negro in Texas History for the occasion of the Texas Centennial.

After teaching for a year at Claflin College in Orangeburg, South Carolina, Brewer returned to the newly renamed Huston-Tillotson College in 1943 to serve as Chairman of the Department of English Language and Literature, as well as Director of Research. During summers, he also taught at Texas Southern University in Houston. In 1945, Brewer published Humorous Folktales of the South Carolina Negro. The next year he published Mexican Border Ballads and Other Lore, which included his story collection entitled "John Tales", with the Texas Folklore Society. The "John Tales" feature the eponymous John, who according to Glasrud and Jordan is "the trickster hero of the southern plantation [who] always comes out victorious in his contests with the slave owner or overseer." In 1947, Brewer privately published a volume of works entitled More Truth Than Poetry. With illustrations drawn by H. E. Johnson, Glasrud and Jordan describe this volume of poetry as "Brewer at his sardonic best".

== Middle career and success ==
In 1951, Brewer was granted an honorary Doctor of Literature degree by Paul Quinn College in Waco, for "his unmatched contribution to African American literature and folklore." In 1953, he published The Word on the Brazos: Negro Preacher Tales from the Brazos Bottoms of Texas, through the University of Texas Press; it was "widely" considered a "classic", according to Byrd, and Texas historian Walter Prescott Webb referred to it as "the best of its sort ever". Glasrud and Jordan called it "his first major folklore collection". Jet magazine named it its Book of the Week on February 11, 1954, noting how Brewer had "interviewed old-timers and carefully collected tales which have been handed down for generations." In 1956, Brewer published a limited edition of 400 for his Aunt Dicey Tales, a collection of 14 "snuff-dipping tales of the Texas Negro". This edition was also well known and well regarded for its crayon drawings by John T. Biggers; Dobie observed that the "tales illustrate the drawings as much as the drawings illustrate the tales". In 1958 Brewer published what Byrd considers his "third and best" of his "major volumes", Dog Ghosts and Other Texas Negro Folk Tales; of its 63 stories, only 9 are ghost stories involving dog ghosts. Glasrud and Jordan called it "a rich and delightful trove of stories".

Brewer began his tenure as a professor of English at Livingstone College in Salisbury, North Carolina, in 1959. After moving to North Carolina, Brewer's most significant publications were the articles "Animal Tales as Told by African Students of Livingstone College" and "North Carolina Negro Oral Narratives" (both published in the journal North Carolina Folklore) and two books, Three Looks and Some Peeps (1963) and Worser Days and Better Times (1965).

== Later career ==
In 1969, Brewer published a "well-received" collection of stories entitled American Negro Folklore through Quadrangle Books and the New York Times Book Company. In the same year he took a position as Visiting Distinguished Professor at East Texas State University (ETSU) in Commerce, Texas (now Texas A&M University–Commerce), where he taught until his death in 1975. While at ETSU, he organized symposia and workshops in addition to teaching classes, which he occasionally lectured in verse, while also turning his major research focus to African influences on Mexican folklore. He was the first African American professor in ETSU's English Department, and was appointed only one year after David Talbot became the university's first African American professor. In 1972, Brewer wrote the introduction to Henry D. Spalding's Encyclopedia of Black Folklore and Humor, as well as the 80-page chapter "Plantation to Emancipation". Spalding introduced Brewer's chapter by calling Brewer "the nation's most illustrious black folklorist". By the end of his career, Brewer had received research grants for his work in African American folklore from the American Philosophical Society, the Library of Congress, the National Library of Mexico, the National University of Mexico, and Piedmont University's Center for the Study of Negro Folklore.

== Personal life ==
Brewer was a Methodist and a member of the Democratic Party. He married twice, and had a son with his first wife; his second wife, Ruth Helen, was from Hitchcock, Texas. After his death, he was buried in Austin.

== Legacy ==
Brewer was the first African American to be an active member of the Texas Folklore Society, to be a member of the Texas Institute of Letters, and to serve on the council of the American Folklore Society, where he rose to the position of vice-president. He was also the first African American to deliver a lecture series at the University of Arizona, the University of California, and the University of Colorado. Additionally, he broke the color barrier at Austin's Driskill Hotel when he was inducted into the Texas Institute of Letters.

Geneva Smitherman called Brewer "America's most distinguished Negro folklorist", Charles Leland Sonnichsen called him the "premier collector of Negro folklore in Texas", while Alan Dundes referred to him as "one of the few professionally trained Negro folklorists". Humanities Texas argued that he "almost single-handedly preserved the African American folklore of his home state." Brewer is often compared with Floridian Zora Neale Hurston because, in the words of Byrd, "they were both successful in collecting and publishing Negro folklore." He has also been compared to Joel Chandler Harris due to both his subject matter and the "extended use of Negro dialect" in his writings. He has additionally been compared to Alain Locke, although Brewer himself criticized the Harlem Renaissance as "unrepresentative" of the African American experience. Byrd considers Brewer's best long works, in order of publication, to be The Word on the Brazos, Aunt Dicy Tales, Dog Ghosts, and Worser Days and Better Times. Byrd also emphasized the importance of humor in the stories Brewer collected. According to Texas scholar Michael Phillips, themes prevalent in Brewer's stories include "intelligence winning over brute force" and "a defiant attitude toward white America".

A 1969 interview with Brewer is featured in the Oral History Collection at Texas Tech University's Southwest Collection. In 1997, Brewer was posthumously given the Compañero/a de las Americas award by the American Folklore Society for his "outstanding contributions to the further understanding of folk traditions in the Americas and the Caribbean" at the same ceremony at which his friend Américo Paredes was likewise honored. In 1999, the University of Texas at Austin's Harry Ransom Center held an exhibition on Aunt Dicy Tales that prominently featured the illustrations created by John Biggers. In January 2017, Texas A&M University–Commerce held a J. Mason Brewer Day featuring Brewer scholars Bruce Glasrud and Milton Jordan as well as a panel discussion involving his former colleagues and students.

Brewer described his tales in Dog Ghosts in his own words as "as varied as the Texas landscape, as full of contrasts as Texas weather. Among them are tales that have their roots deeply embedded in African, Irish, and Welsh mythology; other have parallels in pre-Columbian Mexican traditions; and a few have versions that can be traced back to Chaucer's England."

== Bibliography ==
=== Books ===
- Brewer, J. Mason (1922). Echoes of Thought. Fort Worth, Texas: Progressive Printing.
- Brewer, J. Mason (1923). Glimpses of Life. Fort Worth, Texas: Progressive Printing.
- Brewer, J. Mason (1933). Negrito: Negro Dialect Poems of the Southwest. San Antonio: Naylor Publishing.
- Brewer, J. Mason (1935). Negro Legislators of Texas and Their Descendants: A History of the Negro in Texas Politics from Reconstruction to Disfranchisement. Dallas: Mathis Publishing.
- Brewer, J. Mason, ed. (1936). Heralding Dawn: An Anthology of Verse by Texas Negroes. [Dallas]: June Thomason Printing.
- Brewer, J. Mason (1936). The Negro in Texas History. Dallas: Mathis Publishing.
- Brewer, J. Mason, ed. (1936). Patriotic Moments; A Second Book of Verse. Dallas: privately printed.
- Brewer, J. Mason (1938). A History of the Dallas High School for Negroes. Dallas: Friends of the Dallas Public Library.
- Brewer, J. Mason (1938). John Wesley Anderson: A Life in Verse. Dallas: Clyde C. Cockrell & Sons.
- Brewer, J. Mason, ed. (1940). An Historical Outline of the Negro in Travis County. Austin, Texas: Samuel Huston College.
- Brewer, J. Mason (1940). Little Dan from Dixie-Land. Dallas: Bookcraft.
- Brewer, J. Mason (1945). Humorous Folktales of the South Carolina Negro. Orangeburg, South Carolina: Claflin College Press.
- Brewer, J. Mason (1947). More Truth Than Poetry. Austin, Texas: privately published.
- Brewer, J. Mason, ed. (1948). Silhouettes of Life: A Group of Short Stories. Austin, Texas: Samuel Huston College.
- Brewer, J. Mason (1951). A Pictorial and Historical Souvenir of Negro Life in Austin, Texas, 1950–51: Who's Who and What's What. Austin, Texas: privately published.
- Brewer, J. Mason (1953). The Word on the Brazos: Negro Preacher Tales from the Brazos Bottoms of Texas. Austin, Texas: University of Texas Press.
- Brewer, J. Mason (1956). Aunt Dicy Tales: Snuff-Dipping Tales of the Texas Negro. Austin, Texas: privately published (J. Mason Brewer).
- Brewer, J. Mason (1958). Dog Ghosts and Other Texas Negro Folk Tales. Austin, Texas: University of Texas Press.
- Brewer, J. Mason (1963). Three Looks and Some Peeps. Salisbury, North Carolina: privately printed.
- Brewer, J. Mason (1965). Worser Days and Better Times. Chicago: Quadrangle Books.
- Brewer, J. Mason (1968). American Negro Folklore. New York City: New York Times Book Company.

==== Negro Heritage Series ====
- Brewer, J. Mason, ed. (1969). Adventures of an African Slaver, Being a True Account of the Life of Captain Theodore Conot. Austin, Texas: Pemberton Press.
- Brewer, J. Mason, ed. (1969). Memoirs of Elleanore Eldridge. Austin, Texas: Pemberton Press.
- Brewer, J. Mason, ed. (1969). The Missionary Pioneer: Or a Brief Memoir of the Life, Labors, and Death of John Stewart. Austin, Texas: Pemberton Press.
- Brewer, J. Mason, ed. (1970). Memorials Presented to the Congress of the United States for Promoting the Abolition of Slavery. Austin, Texas: Jenkins Publishing.

=== Articles ===
- Brewer, J. Mason, "Juneteenth", Tone the Bell Easy, J. Frank Dobie, ed. Volume X (Austin, Texas: Texas Folklore Society, 1932), pages 9–54.
- Brewer, J. Mason, "Old-Time Negro Proverbs", Spur-of-the-Cock, J. Frank Dobie, ed. Volume XI (Austin, Texas: Texas Folklore Society, 1933), pages 101–105.
- Brewer, J. Mason, "The Negro and the Texas Centennial Exposition", The Houston Informer August 8, 1936, section 2, page page 4.
- Brewer, J. Mason, "American Negro Folklore", Phylon 6 (1945): pages 354–361.
- Brewer, J. Mason, "Negro Folklore in North America: A Field of Research", New Mexico Quarterly 17 (1946): pages 27–33.
- Brewer, J. Mason, "John Tales", Mexican Border Ballads and Other Lore, J. Frank Dobie, ed. Volume XXI (Austin, Texas: Texas Folklore Society, 1946), pages 81–104.
- Brewer, J. Mason, "Afro-American Folklore", Journal of American Folklore 60 (1947): pages 377–383.
- Brewer, J. Mason, "Texas Negro Tales", Interracial Review (December 1959): pages 236–237.
- Brewer, J. Mason, "North Carolina Negro Oral Narratives", North Carolina Folklore 9 (July 1961): pages 21–33.
- Brewer, J. Mason, "A Negro Cowboy: J. H. Brewer", in American Negro Folklore, edited by J. Mason Brewer (New York City: New York Times Books, 1968), pages 275–278.
- Brewer, J. Mason, "Animal Tales as Told by African Students of Livingstone College", North Carolina Folklore 16 (May 1968).
- Brewer, J. Mason, "More of the Word on the Brazos", Observations & Reflections on Texas Folklore, Francis Edward Abernethy, ed. Dallas: Southern Methodist University Press, 1972: pages 91–99.
- Brewer, J. Mason, "Tales from Juneteenth", The Folklore of Texan Cultures, Francis Edward Abernethy, ed. Austin, Texas: The Encino Press, 1974: pages 115–118.
- Brewer, J. Mason, "Introduction", Encyclopedia of Black Folklore and Humor, Henry D. Spalding, ed. New York City: Jonathan David, 1994. Pages ix–x.
