= Josiah Brewer =

American minister and author

Josiah Brewer (June 1, 1796 – November 19, 1872) was an American minister and author. He was the father of U.S. Supreme Court justice David Josiah Brewer.

== Biography ==
Brewer was born June 1, 1796, in Monterey, then a part of Tyringham, Mass. He graduated from Phillips Academy in 1817 and Yale College in 1821. He began the study of theology at Andover Seminary in 1822, but in 1824 transferred himself to New Haven and finished his studies with the first class which received instruction in the Theological Department of Yale College. He was also for nearly two years, from 1824 to 1826, a tutor in the college.

He was ordained at Springfield, Mass, May 10, 1826, as a missionary, and in the following September, under the direction of the Boston Female Society, he embarked on a mission for the promotion of Christianity among the Ottoman Jews. He spent about two years residing in Smyrna and Istanbul, and then returned to the U.S. where he published a volume descriptive of his residence in Turkey, A Residence at Constantinople in the Year 1827 (1830), and was married, December 1, 1829, to Emilia Ann, daughter of Rev. D. D. Field, of Stockbridge, Mass and sister of future US Supreme Court justice Stephen Johnson Field. In 1830 he went back to Smyrna, where he remained for eight years as a missionary of the Ladies Greek Association of New Haven, Conn.

After his final return to this country, in 1838, he was for three years chaplain of the Connecticut State Prison, at Wethersfield, and for a short time afterwards agent of the American Anti-Slavery Society, and editor of an anti-slavery paper in Hartford, Conn. In 1844 he opened a Young Ladies' Seminary in New Haven, Conn, which was afterwards removed to Middletown, Conn., and which occupied him until 1857. He then took up his residence in Stockbridge, Mass., and after serving for nine years as stated supply of the Congregational Church in the neighboring town of Housatonic, lived in retirement until his decease (preceded by a few months of severe suffering), November 19, 1872.

Emilia Brewer died December 16, 1861, and he was married in May 1863, to Lucy Treadwell Jerome, of New Hartford, Conn., daughter of the late Rev. Amasa Jerome. Two sons graduated Yale; the elder in 1852 and David Josiah Brewer in 1856. His sons and four daughters, by his first wife, survived him, except for his youngest son, who died of typhoid fever contracted in the American Civil War.

He was the namesake of Brewer Normal Institute (1872–1970), a segregated school for African American students in Greenwood, South Carolina.
