= Richard B. Brewer =

American businessman

- Born: April 6, 1951
- Died: August 15, 2012 (aged 61)
- Education: Virginia Tech; Northwestern University
- Scientific career
- Workplaces: Genentech; Heartport; Scios; Myrexis

Richard Brooke Brewer (April 6, 1951 – August 15, 2012) was a biotechnology and pharmaceutical industry executive. At the time of his death in 2012, he was president and chief executive officer of Myrexis, which he had joined in May 2012.

== Education ==
Brewer received a bachelor of science from Virginia Tech in 1974 and an MBA from Northwestern University in 1984.

== Career ==
From 1984 to 1995, Brewer was the senior vice president of sales and marketing and later the senior vice president of Genentech Europe and Canada. Brewer was then the chief operating officer of Heartport from 1996 to 1998.

In 1998, he became the president and chief executive officer of Scios, a position he held until 2004. In 2001, he was diagnosed with multiple myeloma, a form of blood cancer. He was the managing partner of Crest Asset Management from 2003 to 2009.

In his career, Brewer guided development and commercialization of breakthrough drugs including human growth hormone for children's growth disorders; the first new drug in 30 years for cystic fibrosis; the first new drug in over a decade for heart failure; clot-busting drugs for heart attacks and strokes; and other drugs and devices for cancer and heart disease.

He served on the board of directors of several companies, including SRI International. At the time of his death, he was chairman of the board of ARCA biopharma and Dendreon Corporation, and was executive chairman of Nile Therapeutics.
