= C. J. Hamilton (author) =

Irish author (1841–1935)

Catherine Jane Hamilton
- Born: 1841; Kilmersdon, Somerset
- Died: 28 February 1935 (aged 93–94); Freckenham, Suffolk
- Occupation: Writer
- Writing career
- Pen name: Retlaw Spring

Catherine Jane Hamilton (1841 – 1935) was an author and journalist who also wrote under the pen name, Retlaw Spring.

== Life ==
She was born to a family with Irish roots in Somerset, second daughter of Richard Hamilton (1805/6–1859), vicar of Kilmersdon, and his wife, Charlotte, née Cooper (1809–1882). She was baptised on 12 April 1841. As a child Hamilton was raised at the old vicarage but suffered a bout of typhoid fever and was extremely ill. Her father moved the family to a better house when she was eleven as a result. She was educated at home with her sister by governesses and learned French, Latin and Greek due to her father's influence. She taught in the local Sunday school and helped her father as he lost both his hearing and sight. His death in 1859 left the family unable to survive and they had to rely on relatives for support. They moved to Ballickmoyler, Queen’s County, Ireland where her mother's family had a home. Hamilton lived in Ireland for many years. Her sister married a widower, Wrigley Grimshaw, in 1875. Hamilton was living with her for the census in 1901.

== Career ==
Hamilton published over twenty-five books including drama, poetry and fiction. Initially, she wrote under the pen name but after 1880, she started signing her work as C. J. Hamilton. Hamilton wrote religious fiction for children as well as shorter tales in illustrated journals aimed at children. She also wrote fiction for a wide number of journals such as Englishwoman’s Domestic Magazine and Young Englishwoman, Dublin University Magazine, The Graphic, St. Paul's Magazine, The National Review and London Society.

Hamilton wrote a series on notable women writers, actors and intellectuals which was eventually produced in volumes for publication. She was employed by the Weekly Irish Times from 1906 and Pall Mall Gazette from 1913. She was a member of the Women Writers' Club and the Institute of Journalists. By 1906, Hamilton had returned to London where she remained for about ten years. She then moved to Devon and Bury St Edmunds. She died 28 February 1935, in Freckenham.

== Selected works ==
- Notable Irishwomen, (1904)
- Women writers:their works and ways, (1892)
- Famous love matches
- Marriage Bonds, (1878)
- Hedged with Thorns: or, Working, Waiting and Winning. London: Ward, Lock, 1875
- Marriage Bonds: or, Christian Hazell's Married Life. London: Ward, Lock, 1879
- The Flynns of Flynnville. London: Ward, Lock, 1880
- Mr. Bartram's Daughter: An Every-Day Story. Derby: Bemrose and Sons, 1882
- True to the Core: A Romance of '98. 2 vol. London: F. V. White, 1883
- Rivals at School: or, A Lesson for Life. London: Sunday School Union, 1888
- Dr. Belton's Daughters. London: Ward, Lock, 1890
- The Battle of the Waves: or, The Herring Boat. London: R.T.S., 1890
- The Merry-go-Round. London: R.T.S., 1894
- From Hand to Hand: or, The Adventures of a Jubilee Sixpence. London: Partridge, 1895
- The Strange Adventures of Willie Norman. London: R.T.S., 1898
- A Flash of Youth. London: Sands, 1900
- Frank and Flo on their Travels. London: R.T.S., 1901
- The Macsorley Talisman, The Graphic Christmas 1876
- Two drawing room plays, Defeated: A Tale [Beeton's Christmas Annual] by Hannah Lynch (London: London : Ward, Lock & Co. 1885])
