= Guy Arnold =

British author (1932–2020)

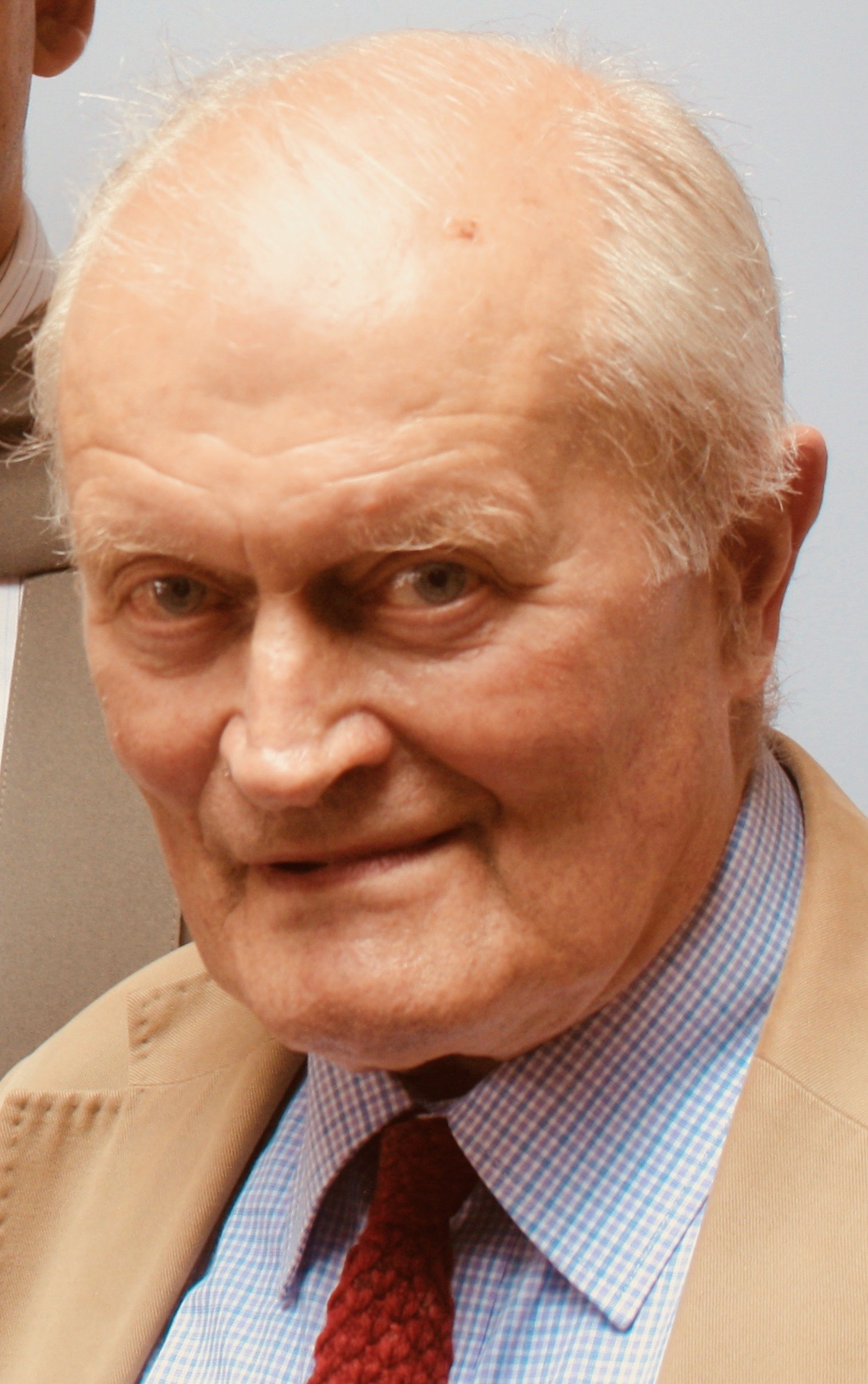
- Arnold in 2011
- Born: 6 May 1932; Birkenhead, Cheshire, England, United Kingdom
- Died: 4 January 2020 (aged 87); Hammersmith, London, England, United Kingdom
- Education: St Peter's College, Oxford
- Occupation: Writer
- Political party: Conservative Party

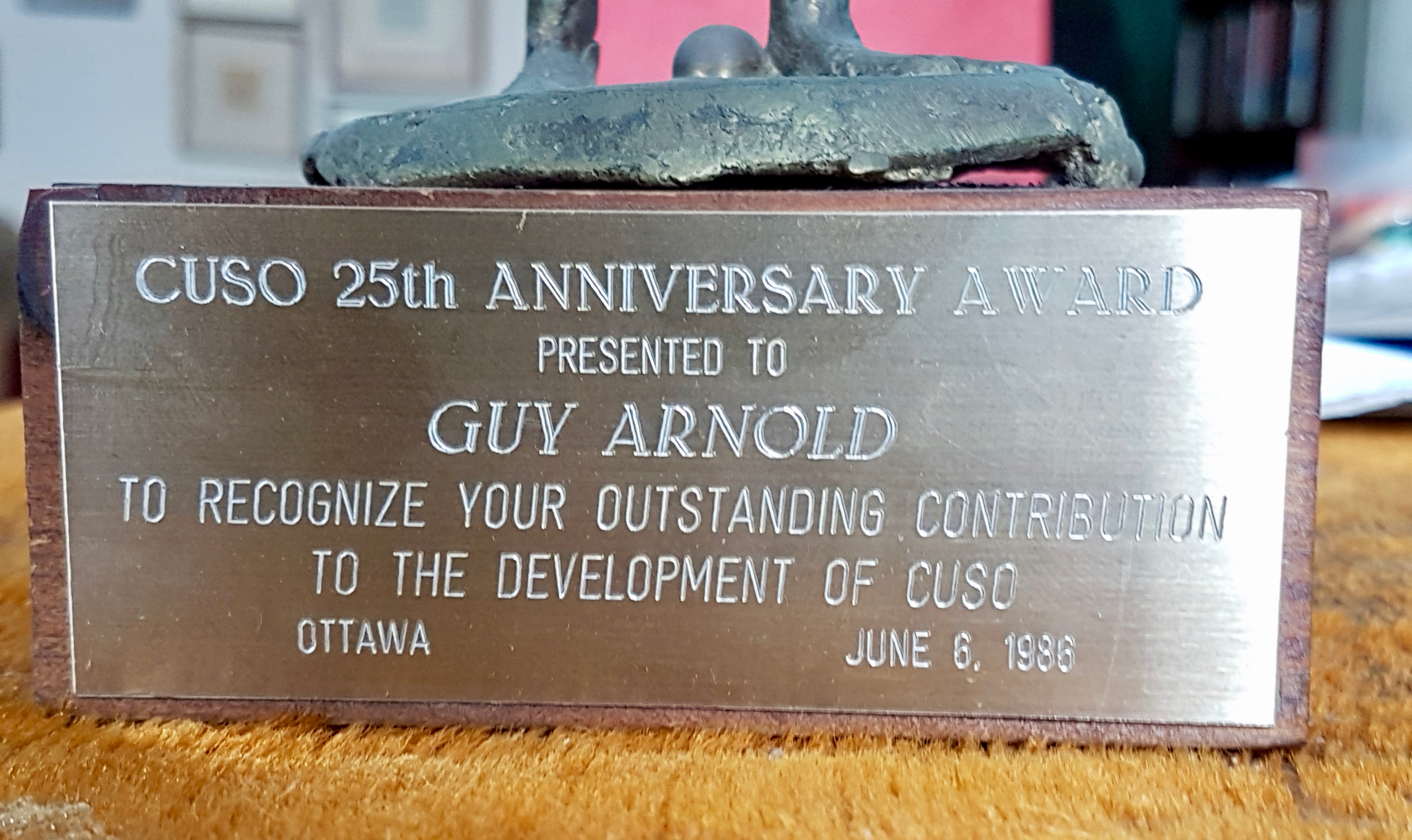
Plaque on CUSO Award

Guy Arnold (6 May 1932 – 4 January 2020) was a British explorer, travel writer, political writer and specialist in north-south relations, who wrote mainly in the areas of African history, politics, and international affairs. He was based in Marylebone, London.

== Biography ==
Guy Arnold was one of five children by George Arnold and Rita Shaw; he also had two half siblings (one deceased). He was an elder brother to Bruce Arnold, a novelist, non-fiction writer and journalist based in Dublin. Although born on Merseyside, he was brought up at the family home in Croydon and went to Kingham Hill School, a boarding school in Oxfordshire, thence to Chipping Norton Grammar School, before going on to St Peter's College, Oxford where he read History graduating in 1955.

Arnold was active in the Conservative Party at Oxford and in 1954 along with undergraduates Michael Heseltine, Julian Critchley and Martin Morton canvassed workers at the gates of the Vickers Shipyard in Barrow-in-Furness as part of the 1955 general election campaign. On leaving Oxford, in 1955, with three other Oxford graduates Colin Campbell, Tom Chavasse and Gordon Pickles, he undertook an exploration of the Usun Apau Plateau and the Plieran River in Sarawak, Borneo. He subsequently wrote a number of articles including "Economic Needs of Sarawak" for New Commonwealth Magazine, 'Music in Sarawak' for the Times Educational Supplement and "Prehistory of Usun Apau" for the Sarawak Museum Journal; these led to the writing of his first travel book 'Longhouse and Jungle'.

In 1958, he moved to Canada for five years and taught first at Pickering College and then at Ryerson Polytechnical Institute; during this period he was instrumental in setting up the Canadian University Service Overseas (CUSO). In 1988, his contribution to the establishment of CUSO was recognised with an award for his 25 years of service to the organisation.

In 1964, he travelled to Northern Rhodesia as an adviser to the leader of the United National Independence Party (UNIP), Kenneth Kaunda. He was regularly seen at regional UNIP offices in the yellow Packard car provided for him by Kaunda. During this period he met and stayed with Stewart Gore-Browne, later the subject of The Africa House by Christina Lamb; at the time Arnold was suffering from malaria which Gore-Brown treated with red wine. After independence in October 1964 and Kaunda's ascendancy as president, Arnold left the newly independent Zambia and drove from Lusaka to London in a newly acquired Land-rover, a journey of over 11,500 km; he was accompanied by Alan Leather who was finishing his stint with Voluntary Service Overseas (VSO). In London Arnold rented a flat in Seymour Place which was to become his home for the next 53 years, the Land Rover parked outside until parking restrictions were introduced. His flat was directly above that of the photographer Deste who became a lifelong friend and colleague until her death in 1986.

Over the course of his career, he also worked with the Overseas Development Institute, created a National Youth Service in Zambia in the period before its independence in 1964, and was Director of the Africa Bureau (a non-governmental lobby group) from 1968 to 1972, as well as working as a consultant in the field. He was the author of more than 50 books including travelogues and educational books for children.

He lectured and taught courses on international affairs for over thirty years, at the Workers’ Educational Association and the University of Surrey.

While most government officials on both sides of the Atlantic have supported the Special Relationship between Britain and the United States, Arnold was a critic. In 2014, he described it as a "sickness in the body politic of Britain that needs to be flushed out." Instead he called for closer relationship with Europe and Russia so as to rid "itself of the US incubus".

Arnold died on 4 January 2020.

== Bibliography ==
- Longhouse and Jungle: an expedition to Sarawak (1959)
- Towards Peace and a Multiracial Commonwealth (1964)
- Economic Co-operation in the Commonwealth (1967)
- Rhodesia, Token Sanctions or Total Economic Warfare (1972)
- Sanctions Against Rhodesia, 1965 to 1972 (1972)
- Kenyatta and the Politics of Kenya (1974)
- The Last Bunker: A Report on White South Africa Today (1976)
- Modern Nigeria (1977)
- Strategic Highways of Africa (1977)
- Statistical Guide to the Nigerian Market (1978)
- Britain's Oil (1978)
- Aid in Africa (1979)
- Held Fast for England: G. A. Henty, Imperialist Boys' Writer (1980)
- Modern Kenya (1981)
- The Unions (1981)
- Datelines of World History (1983)
- Coal (1985)
- Gas (1985)
- Aid and the Third World: The North/South Divide (1985)
- Journey Round Turkey (1989)
- Book of Dates: A Chronology of World History (1989)
- Britain since 1945: Choice, Conflict and Change (1989)
- Down the Danube: The Black Forest to the Black Sea (1989)
- Facts on Water, Wind, and Solar Power (1990)
- Facts on Nuclear Energy (1990)
- Revolutionary and Dissident Movements: An International Guide (1991)
- The World Trade System (1991)
- Brainwash: The Cover-up Society (1992)
- South Africa: Crossing the Rubicon – Volume 1992, Part 2 (1992)
- The End of the Third World (1993)
- Political and Economic Encyclopaedia of Africa (1993)
- The Third World Handbook (1994)
- Wars in the Third World since 1945 (1995)
- The Maverick State: Gaddafi and the New World Order (1996)
- Historical Dictionary of Aid and Development Organizations (1996)
- The Resources of the Third World (1997)
- World Government by Stealth: The Future of the United Nations (1997)
- Mercenaries: The Scourge of the Third World (1999)
- The New South Africa (2000)
- World Strategic Highways (2000)
- Guide to African Political and Economic Development (2001)
- Historical Dictionary of the Crimean War (2002)
- Africa: A Modern History (2005)
- The International Drugs Trade (2005)
- Historical Dictionary of the Non-aligned Movement and Third World (2006)
- In the Footsteps of George Borrow: A Journey through Spain and Portugal (2007)
- Historical Dictionary of Civil Wars in Africa (2008)
- The A to Z of Civil Wars in Africa (2009)
- Morocco in the 21st Century (2009)
- Matter of Opinion (2011)
- Migration: Changing the World (2012)
- America and Britain: Was There Ever a Special Relationship? (2014)
- Travel Tales: Fifty Tales from a Life of International Travel (2015)
- Africa: A Modern History, new edition with afterword: The New Colonialism 2000–2015 (2017)
