= Ngandu =

Ngandu, N’gandu or Ng'andu may refer to

- Ngandu (name)
- Ngandu, Kenya, a settlement
- Ngando people, a group of people living in the Wamba region of the Congo
- Bishop Gatimu Ngandu Girls High School in Kenya
- Lake Ishiba Ng'andu in Zambia
- Shiwa Ngandu, English-style country house and estate in Zambia
