= Nonsuch High School for Girls =

Nonsuch High School For Girls
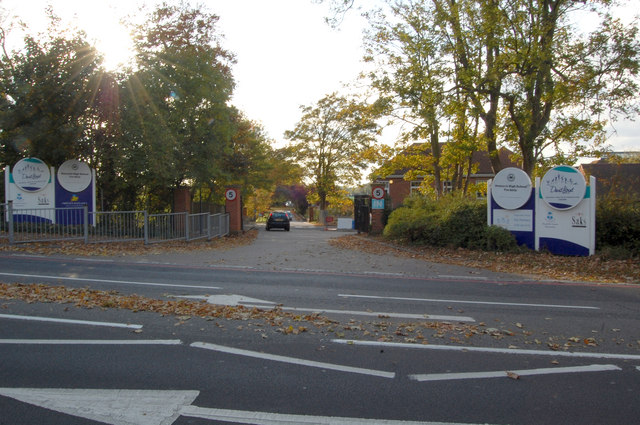

Location
- Ewell Road; Cheam, London, SM3 8AB; England; 51°21′19″N 0°13′26″W

Information
- Type: Grammar academy
- Motto: From 2022: Forging our paths; building the future Before 2022: Deo et aequo animo estote
- Established: 1938
- Department for Education URN: 136795 Tables
- Ofsted: Reports
- Gender: Girls
- Age: 11 to 18
- Enrolment: 1219
- Houses: Mars; Mercury; Pluto; Jupiter; Neptune; Saturn; Venus
- Website: www.nonsuchschool.org

Nonsuch High School is an all-girls' grammar school with an academy status, located in Cheam, in the borough of Epsom and Ewell in Surrey, England, on the border of the London Borough of Sutton, and standing in 22 acres (89,000 m^{2}) of grounds on the edge of Nonsuch Park. In 2023, 100% of its students received a grade of 5 or above in their English and Maths GCSEs, making it among the top 16 state schools.

== History ==
Founded in 1938, the school was named after the palace that once stood in the neighbouring park until it was torn down in the 1680s. It was so-called because it was to be so fine a palace that none such would be found elsewhere. Despite concerns raised by locals regarding a school being built in a park with royal connections, the project was approved and construction officially began on 30 December 1936.

From the beginning, students had to take an entrance examination, and once their place was confirmed, they paid school fees of 4 pounds and 4 shillings to cover stationery, textbooks and facilities. The first headmistress was Miss Marion Dickey, who was succeeded by Miss Matthews in 1964 following her retirement.

During the war years, the school continued to operate, albeit adjusting to wartime conditions. A Home Guard base was set up, they built air-raid shelters and received instructions describing what to do in the event of a German land invasion. Former students have described their experiences in these six years, such as Heather Gee, whose testimony can be found on the school's website. In the years following the war, students attending faced winter fuel shortages, which significantly impacted the structure of the school day, as well as food shortages and rationing. Many of these experiences in the war and immediate post-war period were chronicled by students, such as in the Nonsuch County School Magazine. J. Hutchins, for example, wrote about the Victory in Europe in the October 1945 edition:

It was eight o'clock. By now half England knew that the war was over. Yet no one showed any signs of great jubilation; all was exceptionally quiet except for the birds twittering their evensong, which seemed louder than ever. Could they know? There was no sign in the sky, no renting asunder of the clouds, no flashes of lightning. The trees, who from their height must have seen the earth on which they stood torn up, uttered no cry of gladness because their mother would no longer be mutilated. The War was over, the people rejoiced, but England, "the solid fortress," went serenely on.

This came to light during the COVID-19 pandemic, when the school's then-headteacher received an email from a student who had joined in 1953 and found the magazine among her late sister's memorabilia. Being particularly relevant as another example of a period where the pupils at the school experienced a once-in-a-lifetime event that significantly changed their daily routines, it was shared with students, who later in the year created the 'Quarantine Chronicles', a newsletter run by the school's student leadership team. This both helped students get through lockdown by giving them activities to do, tv show and film recommendations, advice and articles to read, whilst also serving to document the experience of lockdown, thereby entrenching it as part of the school's heritage.

== Leadership and Administration ==
Nonsuch High School's current headteacher is Alexis Williamson, a Geography and Sports Science graduate from Loughborough University who holds numerous leadership qualifications and has over 20 years of experience leading in schools. She initially joined the school in 2021 as Deputy Head of Pastoral, documenting her experience online, before being appointed headteacher in 2024. She works alongside two deputy head teachers and three assistant headteachers, all of whom focus on specific areas as per the 2025-28 School Development Plan.

Previously, the school was led by Amy Cavilla, who had served as a Deputy Headteacher at Tiffin Girls' School until 2016. She saw the school undergo significant changes during her tenure, particularly regarding Equality, Diversity and Inclusion, which the school now aims to uphold as key values, supported by the school's Champions of Anti-Racism and Equality, or CARE, Council. Now the headteacher at Kneller Hall school (formerly Radnor House Twickenham), she has spoken about her experiences as a headteacher and the transition from an all-girls' grammar environment to a co-ed independent school in Series 3 Episode 5 of the podcast 'Heads Unscripted', presented by Simon Gould.

Nonsuch High School is one of four members of the Girls Learning Trust, a group of schools committed to exchanging ideas and sharing resources in order to improve girls' education in their schools. This means that they will often collaborate with these schools, such as when facilitating A-level courses, as well as run events together, allowing the schools to pool their knowledge. This is most clearly demonstrated at the GLT conference, hosted by Nonsuch in 2025, which doubles as an opportunity for staff to meet one another and explore ways to look after their wellbeing or learn more about their specific interests within education.

== Awards and Achievements ==
The school has won various awards such as Beacon status, Sportsmark Award, Schools Achievement Award and Education Extra - Distinction. It also gained specialist science college status in July 2004 and then language school status (although both of these statuses were rendered defunct after they were abolished by the Cameron-Clegg coalition in 2011). Every year, along with St Philomena's Catholic High School for Girls, Nonsuch provides the ball girls for the Queen's Club Championships as well as for the ATP tournament. The school was awarded academy status on 1 June 2011.

More recently, the school was named state secondary school of the year in the South East in the Sunday Times list. In addition, it performed well during its Ofsted inspection in mid-February 2026, achieving exceptional status for its attendance and behaviour, and strong standard status for all other categories.

== Selection ==
As Nonsuch is a grammar school, applicants are required to take the 11+ exam to gain entry into Year 7. The entrance tests take place in two stages, with each one including a paper assessing Maths and paper assessing English. This was a shared selection test with Wallington High School for Girls, then made separate in 2009, before being recombined in 2016. There are also sometimes additional places in other year groups, allocated on the basis of tests in English, Mathematics and Science.

The sixth form admissions process is based on GCSE results rather than a specific set of tests unique to the school. An average points score of 6 in a student's best 8 GCSEs, as well as a grade 6 or above in GCSE Mathematics and either English Language or Literature is required. If a student wishes to take a subject at A-level, they are expected to have achieved a 7 or above in the GCSE corresponding to that subject (with the exclusion of A-level Art, Classical Civilisation, Computer Science, DT: Product Design, Drama, Economics, Music, PE, Politics, Psychology and Philosophy & Ethics).

The Nonsuch catchment area is defined by a circle with a radius of 5.25 km from the front door of the school. 80 places are awarded each year to those with the highest scores in the Entrance Test, whether they live inside or outside the catchment area. Those who pass the test and live within the circle on the cut-off date as defined by the Pan-London Co-ordinated Admissions System are ranked according to the score they achieve. Places are initially allocated according to the ranked order. If however, two or more applicants have the same score and fewer places are available, the place or places will be offered to the child or children who live nearer to the school.

== Academic performance ==
Nonsuch has a strong academic record, with its students consistently achieving high GCSE and A-level results; it is ranked 13th out of the top 400 state secondary schools in the UK according to the Sunday Times.

Note: due to COVID-19, grades in 2020 and 2021 were centrally assessed and teacher assessed, rather than a direct result of traditional examination and coursework.

=== GCSE Results Since 2018 ===
Year	9 - 8 (%)	9 - 7 (%)	9 - 6 (%)	9 - 5 (%)
2018	63.8	83.6	93.9	97.9
2019	66.8	85.5		
2020	70.1	87.8		
2021	74.4	90.0	97.5	99.3
2022	68.8	87.4	96.2	99.1
2023	69.4	86.4	95.5	98.8
2024	67.5	83.8	94.4	98.2
2025	63.6	83.3	94.2	98.2
2026	68.7	84.5	94.7	98.8

=== A-level Results Since 2018 ===
Year	A* (%)	A*- A (%)	A* - B (%)	A* - E (%)
2017	19.3	56.3	82.8	100
2018	20.2	59.2	80.5	99.6
2019	22.2	56.1	79.7	99.6
2020	26.5	63.4	86.4	99.8
2021	32.4	68.5	88.3	99.7
2022	35.3	65.7	86.3	100
2023	19.3	54.3	78.7	99.8
2024	15.9	49.0	76.7	100
2025	28.0	65.2	89.5	99.9
2026	23.5	57.1	81.1	99.3

== Astronomy ==
One of the school's most unique features is its observatory, accessible via stairs leading from the third floor Geography department to the roof. Historically, it was used by Nonsuch's Astronomy Society and those taking the GCSE course, although now it is primarily used by Ewell Astronomical Society.

The school continues to offer GCSE Astronomy with two members of staff teaching the course. In 2026, 4 students took the GCSE, with 25% achieving a grade 9 or 8 and 75% achieving a grade between 9 and 7.

== Notable former pupils ==
- Joanna Rowsell Shand, Olympic cycling champion (2000–2007)
- Elizabeth Kay, author of books such as: The Divide trilogy (1960–67)
- Katie Melua, singer-songwriter
- Melanie South, tennis player
- Susan Lalic (née Walker), British Ladies chess champion.
- Christina Lamb, war correspondent, author of seven books including The Africa House and co-author of I Am Malala.
- Carrie Quinlan, British actress, comedy writer and journalist.
- Suzannah Lipscomb, British historian and television presenter.
- Lolly Adefope, comedian and actor
- Kat Sadler, comedy writer and actor
- Talia Mar, singer-songwriter, internet personality
- Vivien Saunders, Professional Golfer
