= Shiwa Ng'andu (constituency) =

Constituency of the National Assembly of Zambia

Shiwa Ng'andu is a constituency of the National Assembly of Zambia. It covers the towns of Bulaya, Chibesakunda, Chibwa, Chitembo, Chitumbwe, Matumbo and Mutita in Shiwang'andu District of Muchinga Province, as well as the Shiwa Ngandu estate.

== List of MPs ==
Election year	MP	Party
1973	Grace Mulule	United National Independence Party
1978	Ignatius Ngosa	United National Independence Party
1983	Ignatius Ngosa	United National Independence Party
1988	Namutambili Muyoba	United National Independence Party
1991	Celestino Chibamba	Movement for Multi-Party Democracy
1996	Celestino Chibamba	Movement for Multi-Party Democracy
2001	Peter Filamba	Movement for Multi-Party Democracy
2006	Celestino Chibamba	Patriotic Front
2011	Stephen Kampyongo	Patriotic Front
2016	Stephen Kampyongo	Patriotic Front
2021	Stephen Kampyongo	Patriotic Front
2026	Stephen Kampyongo	National Reconciliation Party for Unity and Prosperity
