= Stewart Gore-Browne =

British army officer & politician (1883-1967)

Sir Stewart Gore-Browne DSO
- Born: 3 May 1883; Teddington, Middlesex, England
- Died: 4 August 1967 (aged 84); Kasama Hospital, Zambia
- Burial place: Shiwa Ngandu
- Relatives: Sir Thomas Gore Browne (grandfather) The Rt Rev'd Wilfrid Gore Browne, Bishop of Kimberley and Kuruman (uncle)
- Military career
- Rank: Lieutenant Colonel
- Conflicts: World War I
- Awards: Distinguished Service Order
- Other work: Farming and politics

Lieutenant Colonel Sir Stewart Gore-Browne DSO (3 May 1883 – 4 August 1967), called Chipembele by Zambians, was a British soldier, pioneer white settler, builder, politician and supporter of independence in Northern Rhodesia (now Zambia).

== Early life ==
Gore-Browne was born at 34, Coleshill Road, Middlesex to Francis Gore Browne and Helenor Shaw Stewart, granddaughter of Sir Michael Shaw-Stewart, 6th Baronet. His father was a lawyer and writer on company law, His paternal grandfather was Sir Thomas Gore Browne, who had been governor of New Zealand and Tasmania. His paternal aunt was Ethel Locke King.

Gore-Browne was educated at Wixenford Preparatory School for five years and Harrow School for a further three. He passed into the Royal Military Academy at Woolwich in 1900 and was commissioned into the Royal Field Artillery. From 1902 to 1904 he did survey work in Natal before returning to England to take up motor racing at Brooklands racing circuit created on the Locke family estate by Hugh F. Locke King, the husband of his aunt Ethel Gore-Browne.

Gore-Browne was sent to Northern Rhodesia in 1911 as part of an Anglo-Belgian boundary commission, surveying and laying out the border between the Belgian Congo and Northern Rhodesia. From his boyhood, Gore-Browne had an ambition to own an estate but though comparatively wealthy, knew that he could not afford much land in Britain.

When he heard in 1914 that the British South Africa Company which administered Northern Rhodesia was selling land very cheaply to white settlers in the north-east of the country, he travelled there looking for a site which he found at Shiwa Ngandu.

== Estate in Northern Rhodesia ==
During the First World War, Gore-Browne was sent to the Western Front, where he reached the rank of Lt.-Colonel and was awarded the Distinguished Service Order (DSO). In 1920 he retired from the army and returned to Northern Rhodesia to settle at Shiwa Ngandu and build his estate; the story of the establishment of his estate is told in The Africa House by Christina Lamb.

At his new home Gore-Browne cultivated a military bearing and wore a monocle. The Bemba people called him Chipembere ('Rhinoceros', alternative spelling Chipembele), a name which had originally been given to him when he shot a rhinoceros at Shiwa Ngandu, but later they used it to refer to his temper.

As a young man Gore-Browne courted Lorna Bosworth Smith for three years, but she married Edwin Goldmann. She and Goldmann died young, and in England in 1927, Gore Browne met their orphaned daughter Lorna Goldmann (1908–2002). Despite the quarter-century difference in their ages, they married that year and went to live at Shiwa Ngandu. They had two daughters, Lorna and Angela. However, from 1934 the couple spent much time apart. Lady Gore-Browne did not share her husband's dreams for the estate and they divorced in 1950. She moved to London where she called herself 'Mrs Browne'.

== Political career ==
Gore-Browne's political career began in 1935, when he was elected to Northern Rhodesia's legislative council. Gore-Browne represented one of seven constituencies of voters. He disagreed with British colonial ‘trusteeship' and, instead, looked to a future 'partnership'. He thought settlers ought to have a larger share in government, but also argued for the interdependence of "white and black" prosperity. Unlike other white politicians, such as his friend Roy Welensky, a trade union leader, Gore-Browne felt no threat from African social and educational advance, and the consequent addition of qualified voters to the electoral roll.

These political views can be seen as relating to his management and development of the Shiwa Ngandu estate, where he was completely dependent on the African people and isolated from white settler society by hundreds of kilometres. He realised the need to educate and train local people in the skills his estate required, and realised that it would also benefit from a prosperous local community. To an extent he was paternalistic but was also capable of friendships and good working relationships with many Africans.

From 1938 to 1951 he was nominated to represent African interests in the legislative council, for which he was knighted in 1945. In the Legislative Council, Gore-Browne soon became a power in the land. He helped set the stage for Northern Rhodesia. He was more closely attuned to African thinking than the administration was and "[h]e always enjoyed the respect and trust of Africans ... [h]e was an eloquent speaker and his speeches were the most statesman like that had ever been heard in Northern Rhodesia. He was a man of outstanding calibre, forceful and courageous", said Welensky.

When African mineworkers went on strike in 1940, Gore-Browne counselled limiting the use of force. He also sought out African opinion and denounced various forms of the colour bar (a form of racial segregation). He welcomed the growth of African welfare societies and trade unions, and managed to get the white government to set up African representative councils. In Britain, he made contact with Hastings Kamuzu Banda (the future president of Malawi) and his faith in African abilities was strengthened by visits to Uganda and West Africa in 1946–47.

However, by 1946 Roy Welensky had begun campaigning for the amalgamation of Northern Rhodesia with Southern Rhodesia, where white settlers enjoyed self-government. Gore-Browne was opposed to Welensky's push for amalgamation and resigned in protest from the leadership of the elected members of the legislative council. Instead, he devised a scheme intended to appeal to both white and black people, calling for 'responsible government'. However, he mishandled the scheme's presentation in 1948 and alienated his African supporters. By 1950 he felt that he no longer had a role in politics and resigned from the legislative council in 1951 and retired to devote his energies to Shiwa.

He continued to advise first the African National Congress under his early protégé, Harry Nkumbula and later, after the break away, the United National Independence party, under his close friend, Kenneth Kaunda.

By the late 1950s Shiwa Ng'andu epitomised everything Sir Stewart represented. For years it had been an oasis for travellers on the Great North Road, as a little bit of England in Africa.

== Semi-retirement ==
Gore-Browne spent most of his later years at Shiwa Ngandu, where he replaced citrus crops with cattle. However, he remained actively interested in politics. When, in 1953, the Federation of Rhodesia and Nyasaland was imposed against the wishes of some local settlers and urban Africans, Gore-Browne opposed it because he felt that it was based on the discredited idea of 'partnership'. By 1960 he was committed to African majority rule, and was friendly with Kenneth Kaunda, leader of the United National Independence Party.

In the general election of 1962, Gore-Browne stood for that party. However, he failed to win enough white votes to qualify. In 1964 he was an honoured guest at Zambia's independence ceremonies in Lusaka.

He died from pneumonia at Kasama Hospital, Zambia, on 4 August 1967. He was buried at Shiwa Ngandu two days later in Zambia's only to date state funeral for a white person. Kenneth Kaunda, then President of Zambia, gave the eulogy.

Lady Lorna Gore-Browne, his wife, died in London in 2002 at the age of 93.

John and Lorna Harvey (his daughter) were murdered by gunmen on their other farm in Chisamba in 1992.
