= Marriott Mena House, Cairo =

Hotel located just outside Cairo, Egypt

Coordinates: 29°59′08″N 31°07′58″E

General information
- Location: Giza, Egypt
- Opening: 1883
- Owner: Legacy Hotels
- Operator: Legacy Hotels

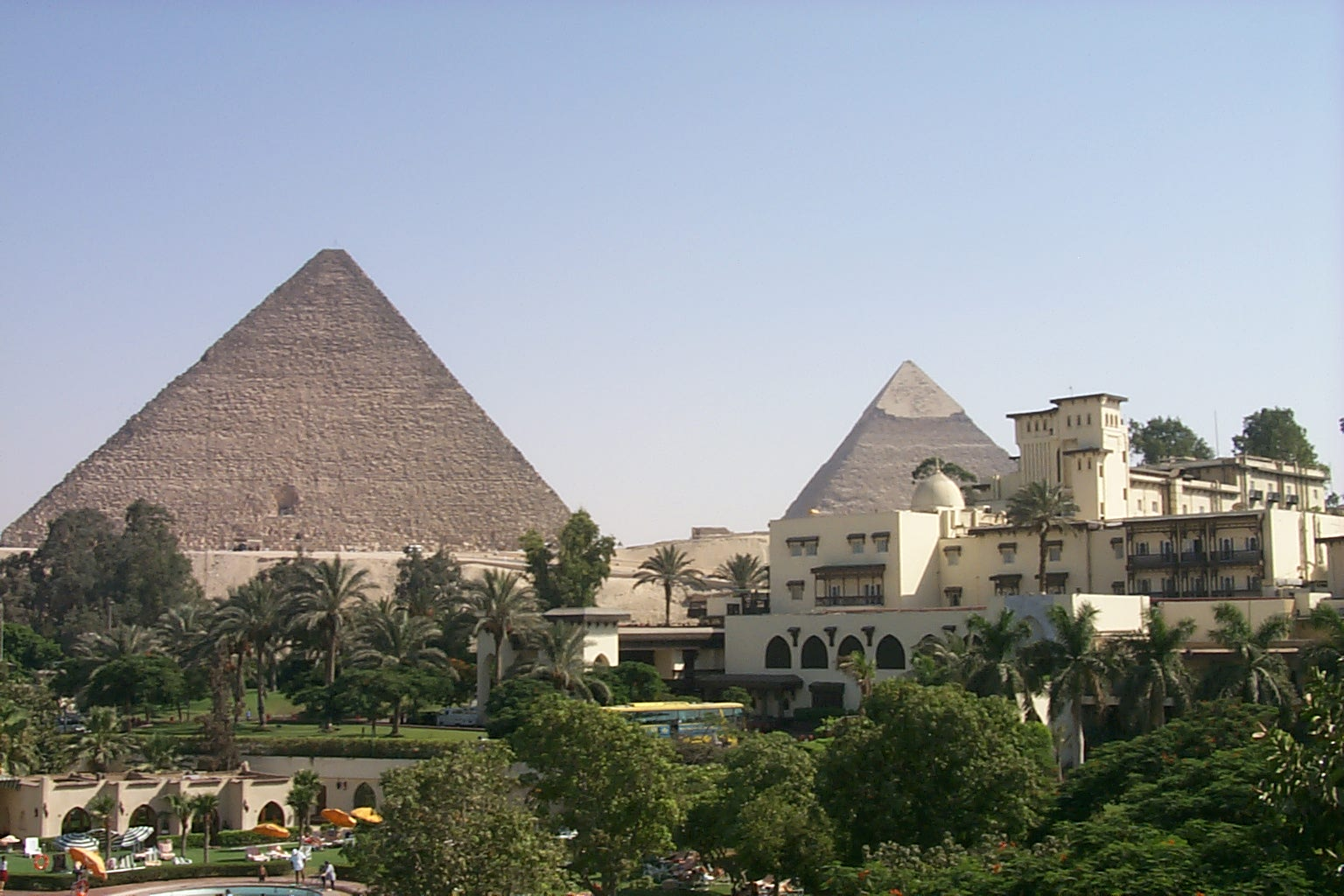
The Marriott Mena House Hotel

Marriott Mena House historically known as the Mena House Hotel is a historic hotel established in 1886, located outside Cairo, Egypt. It is owned by Legacy Hotels Company, affiliated to Talaat Moustafa Group.

== History ==
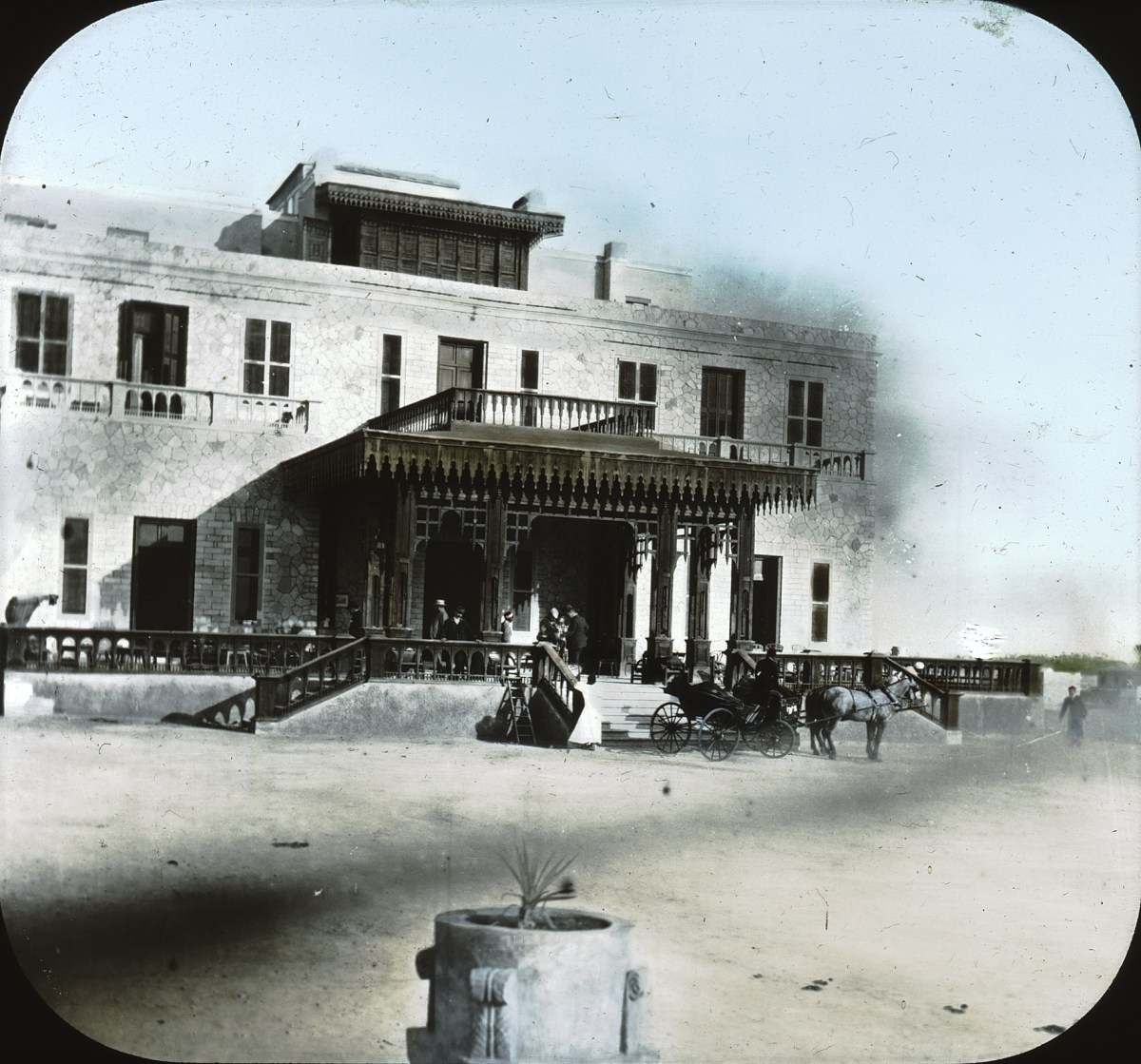
Exterior of the Mena House, 1891

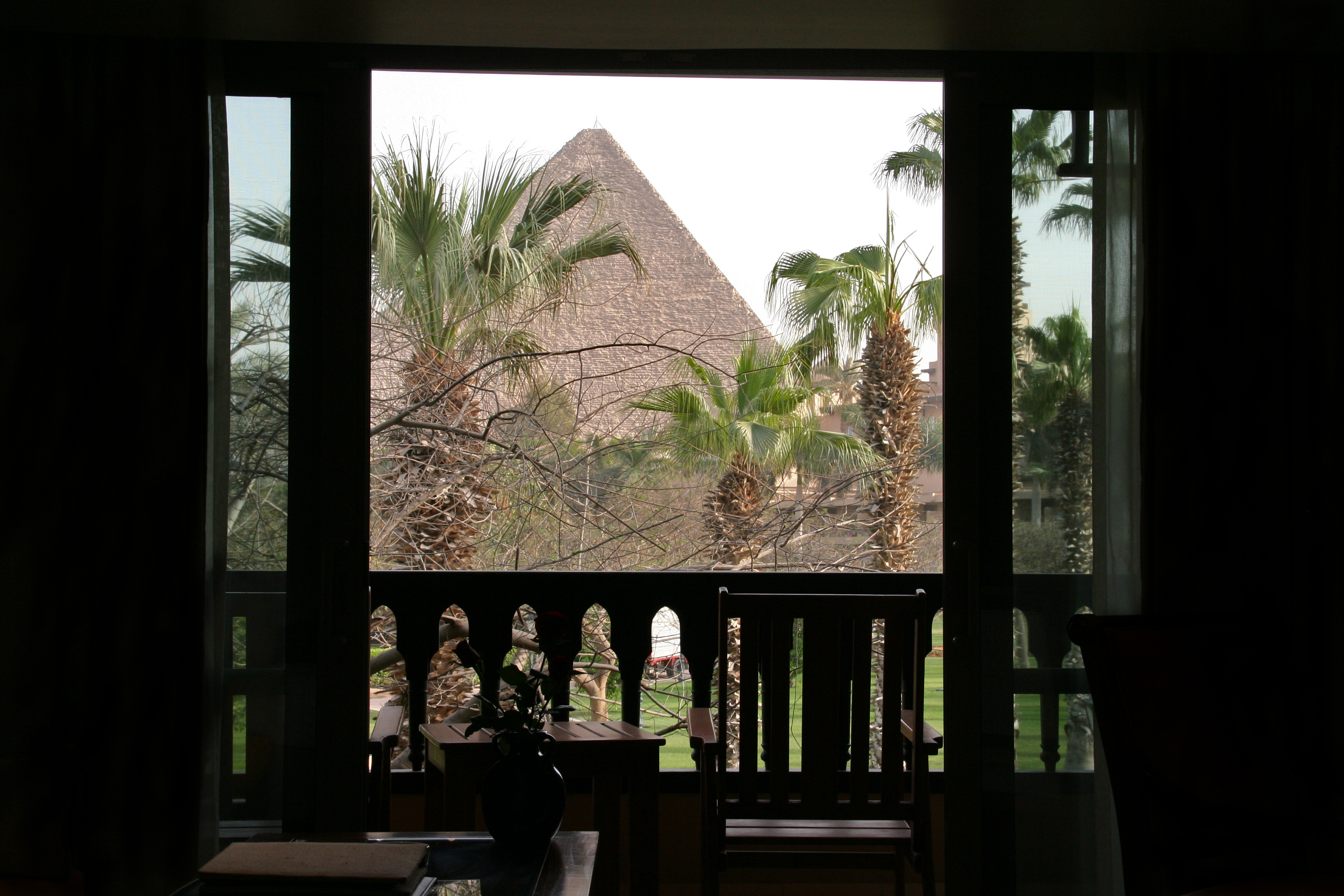
View on the pyramids from the Mena House

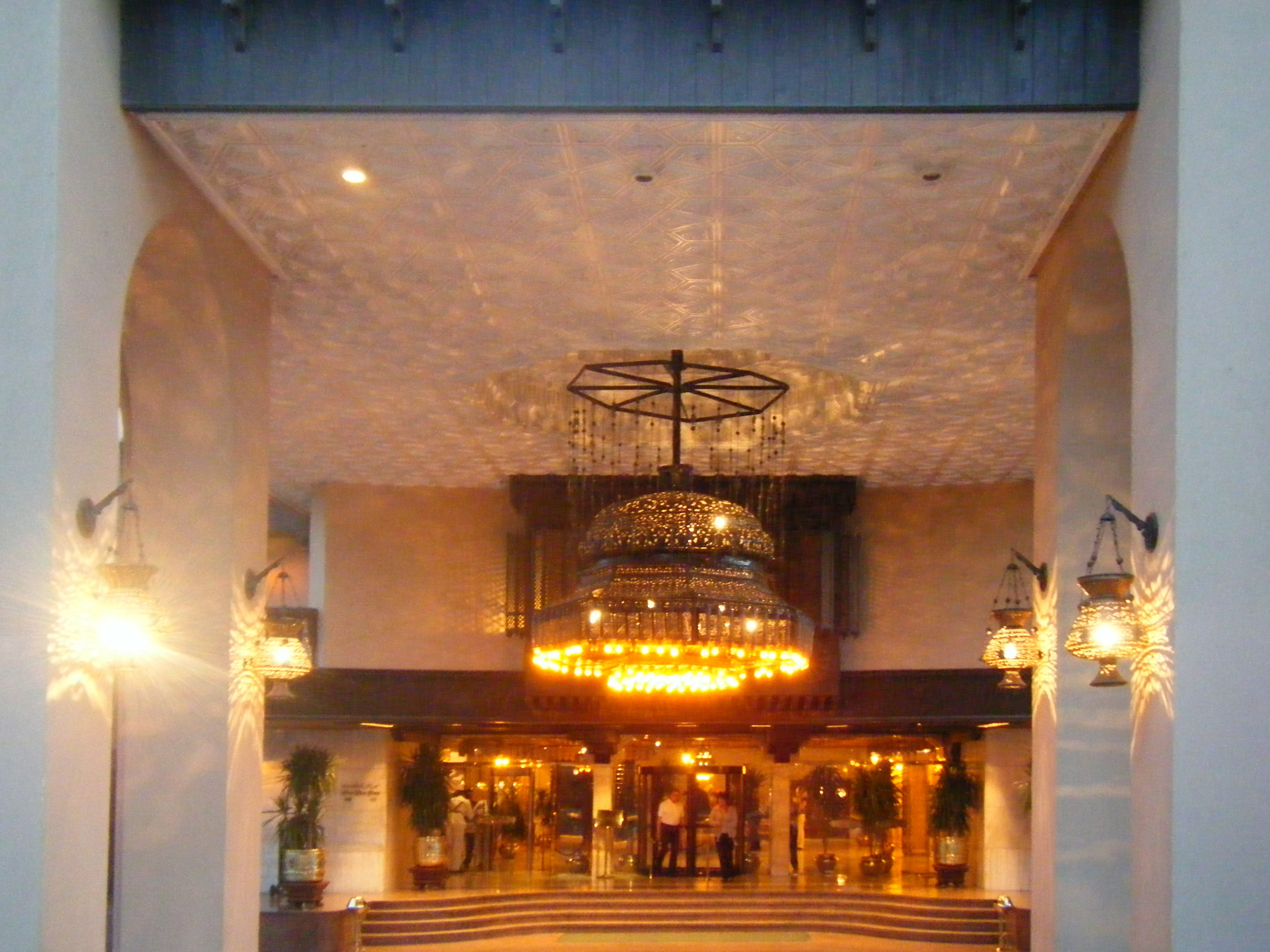
Hotel entrance

The Mena House was initially a hunting lodge; it was a two-story hut nicknamed the "Mud Hut". It was built in 1869 for the Egyptian Khedive Isma'il Pasha.

Due to political matters in 1883, Isma'il sold the lodge to Frederick and Jessie Head as a private residence. The couple came across the building while on their honeymoon and once it was purchased they expanded it. In 1885, it was then sold to an English couple, Ethel and Hugh F. Locke King.

The Locke Kings began construction on the hotel and opened it to the public in 1886 as The Mena House. The hotel is named after the founding father of the first Egyptian dynasty, Mena or King Menes. In 1890, the hotel opened Egypt's first swimming pool and in that same year it was announced that the hotel would remain open year-round. In 1920, 30 more rooms were added.

During World War I the hotel was requisitioned by Australian troops and occupied again by the Australians in 1939. Toward the end of the war it was then converted to a hospital for wounded Australian troops.

The Oberoi Group assumed management of the hotel in 1972 and it was renamed The Mena House Oberoi. A major renovation was completed in 1975. In December 1977, Egypt and Israel sat down together at Mena House in a quest for a peace settlement (also attending were American and United Nations representatives). The results of this Mena House Conference were to lead to the Camp David Agreement, which restored Egypt's sovereignty over the Sinai Peninsula. In 1978, the 200-room garden wing was constructed. It was opened by general manager Kaval Nain Oberoi, a relative of the chain's owner. In 2007 and 2008 the hotel was renovated again.

Oberoi's management contract with EGOTH expired on 31 December 2012 and the hotel was renamed the Mena House Hotel on 1 January 2013. The Egyptian General Company For Tourism & Hotels began operating the hotel. On 31 March 2015, it was announced that Marriott International would assume management of the hotel. The garden wing was renamed Marriott Mena House Cairo on 1 February 2018. The historic Palace wing closed for extensive renovations and will join Marriott's JW Marriott luxury division as JW Marriott Cairo Mena House on the completion of this work. On 20 December 2023, Icon Company, a subsidiary of Talaat Moustafa Group, acquired 51% of Legacy Hotels Company, which owns the hotel.

== Famous visitors ==
In 1889, Prince Albert Victor of Wales stayed at the hotel. In 1894, Sir Arthur Conan Doyle and his wife stayed there. In 1909, the future King George V and Queen Mary attended a banquet there. Circa 1914, Winston Churchill stayed at the hotel. In 1939, King Farouk of Egypt frequently visited. In 1974, President Richard Nixon visited. Many members of state have also stayed there including; King Gustav of Sweden, King Umberto of Italy, Emperor of Ethiopia Haile Selassie and the English military commander Field Marshal Montgomery. The wing where Montgomery stayed still carries his name. Other notable people such as Agatha Christie, Ivan Trush (1912), Roger Moore, Cecil B. DeMille, Charlton Heston, Frank Sinatra, The Grateful Dead, David Lean, Evelyn Waugh, Charlie Chaplin, James Woods, and Denise Woods have all stayed at Mena House.

== See also ==
- Sofitel Winter Palace Hotel
