= Thomas Gore Browne =

British colonial administrator (1807–1887)

Colonel Sir Thomas Gore Browne KCMG CB
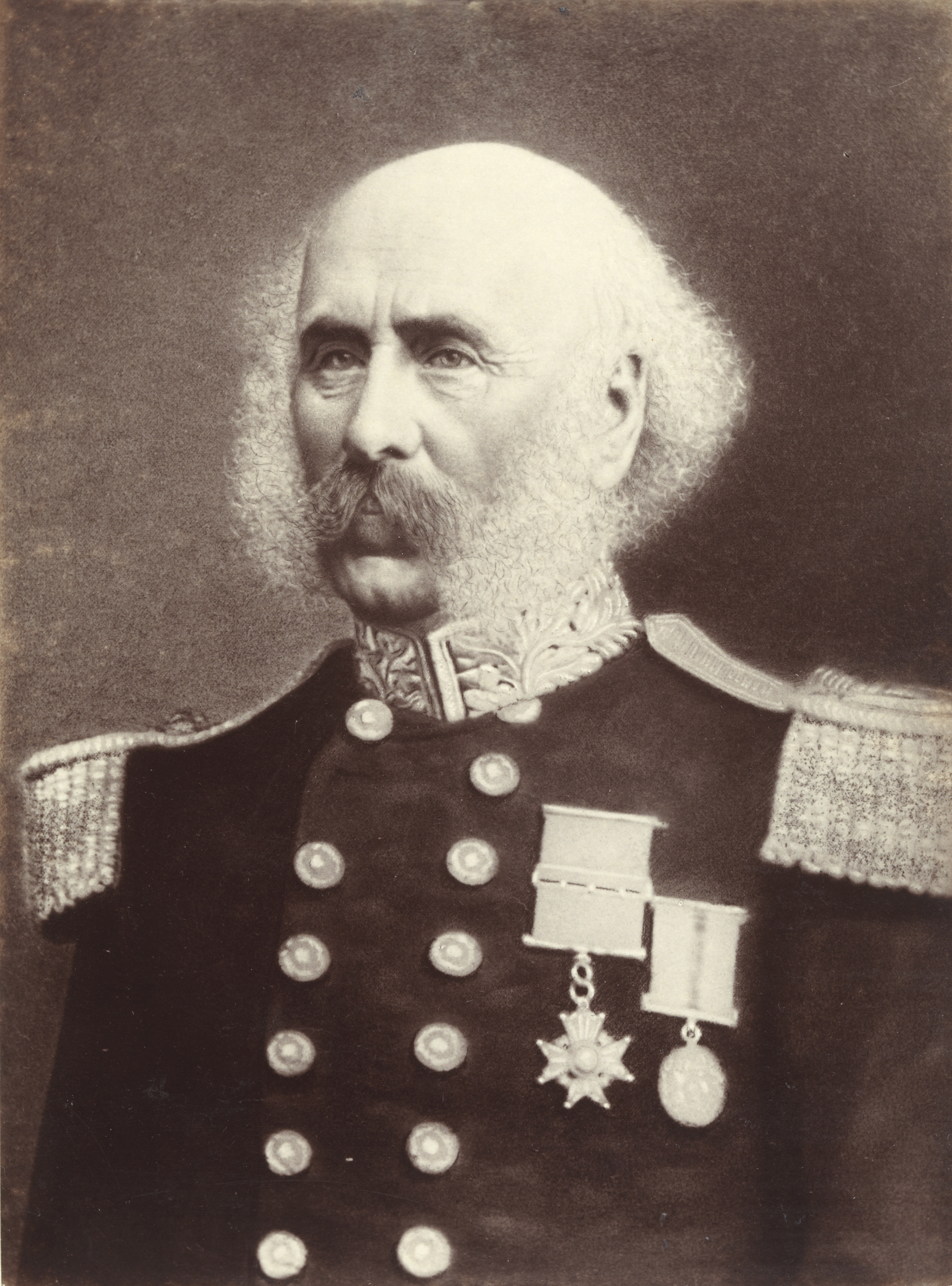

Governor of Saint Helena
- In office 18 July 1851 – 15 December 1854
- Monarch: Victoria
- Preceded by: Patrick Ross
- Succeeded by: Edward Hay Drummond Hay

4th Governor of New Zealand
- In office 6 September 1855 – 3 October 1861
- Monarch: Victoria
- Premier: Henry Sewell; William Fox; Edward Stafford
- Preceded by: Sir George Grey
- Succeeded by: Sir George Grey

2nd Governor of Tasmania
- In office 11 December 1861 – 30 December 1868
- Monarch: Victoria
- Preceded by: Sir Henry Young
- Succeeded by: Charles Du Cane

Personal details
- Born: 3 July 1807 Aylesbury, Buckinghamshire, England
- Died: 17 April 1887 (aged 79) London, England
- Spouse: Harriet Louisa Browne

Colonel Sir Thomas Robert Gore Browne KCMG CB (3 July 1807 – 17 April 1887) was a British colonial administrator, who was Governor of St Helena, Governor of New Zealand, Governor of Tasmania and Governor of Bermuda.

== Early life ==
Browne was born on 3 July 1807 in Aylesbury, in the county of Buckinghamshire, England, a son of Robert Browne and Sarah Dorothea née Steward. Of Irish extraction, the family had a military or church tradition; his father was a colonel in the Buckinghamshire Militia while his younger brother, Harold Browne, later became Bishop of Winchester.

== Military career ==
In 1824, Browne kept up his family's military tradition and joined the British Army as an ensign in the 44th Regiment of Foot. After four years, he transferred into the 28th Regiment of Foot. In 1832, and now a captain, he was appointed aide-de-camp to Baron Nugent, the High Commissioner of the Ionian Islands. He served in this role for three years, which included a spell as colonial secretary.

Now a major, Browne was posted to the 41st Regiment of Foot. In 1842, the regiment was dispatched to Afghanistan and fought in the First Anglo-Afghan War. He led the regiment for a time and commanded the rearguard as the British Army retreated from Khyber Pass into India. After his return from the campaign in Afghanistan, Browne was promoted lieutenant-colonel. He was also appointed a Companion of the Order of the Bath. In 1849, he exchanged into the 21st Regiment of Foot.

Browne retired from the British Army on half-pay in 1851 and shortly took up an appointment as Governor of the island of Saint Helena. He served in this capacity from July 1851 to December 1854, and during this time worked towards improving the island's water supply.

== Marriage ==
In 1851, Browne married Harriet Louisa Campbell. His wife was a considerable support to his political career. She was over 20 years his junior and was well read, socially accomplished with a pleasant personality, and had an excellent understanding of the political environment in which she and her husband circulated. In addition to her influence over Browne, her hospitality and contribution to the social and cultural life during Browne's placements assisted him in influencing others to support his political views.

== Governor of New Zealand ==
In September 1855, Browne was appointed Governor of New Zealand, replacing Administrator Robert Wynyard. His handling of Māori land issues was a contributing factor in the outbreak of the First Taranaki War in a new phase of the New Zealand Wars: despite divisions among Waitara Māori over the ownership of land, Browne persisted with the purchase of the disputed Pekapeka block, further inflaming tensions between Māori and British settlers.

On 5 March 1860, Browne ordered the military occupation of the land, leading to the outbreak of war twelve days later. The following year, he negotiated a truce to end the fighting in the region. His governorship term ended in May 1861; rather than extend it, the Colonial Office in London replaced him with Sir George Grey.

Like his predecessor, George Grey, Browne was honorary president of the Bible Society Auckland auxiliary. At the annual meeting in 1859, Browne complained over anti-Catholic rhetoric. He later apologised to Bishop Pompallier over the incident, which led to backlash from Protestants towards the Anglican Governor. Some individuals complained to the colonial office over Browne's behaviour, although the controversy shifted from Browne towards general anti-Catholicism.

The South Island town of Gore, New Zealand, was named after him.

== Governor of Tasmania ==
In December 1861, Browne was appointed Governor of Tasmania. At the time, Tasmania was struggling economically and people were leaving for better employment prospects on the Australian mainland. To counter this, Browne implemented measures to encourage immigration. He also worked towards improving public education and training in the trades. A popular governor for most of his term, he lost goodwill when he displayed favouritism when filling a public service position. In January 1869, he left Australia for England. While in Melbourne, his point of departure from the country, his youngest child died.

== Later life ==
After being appointed Knight Commander of the Order of St Michael and St George in 1869, Browne, with the assistance of Edward Cardwell, the Secretary of State for War, was appointed Administrator of Bermuda. This was to help secure Browne a pension and he served in this capacity from May 1870 to April 1871.

Brown died in London on 17 April 1887. He was survived by his wife, Harriet Louisa Browne née Campbell. The couple had several children;

- The eldest son, Harold Gore Browne, also served in the British Army and fought in the Boer War of 1899–1900, and took part in the defence of Ladysmith.
- Another son Godfrey Gore Brown was a commander in the Royal Navy and died at Menton on 5 April 1900, aged only 37.
- Another son was Francis Gore Browne, born 7 March 1860, died 2 September 1920. Also known as "Frank". Barrister. Father of Sir Stewart Gore Browne, British soldier, pioneer white settler, builder, politician and supporter of independence in Northern Rhodesia (now Zambia).
- His daughter, Ethel Gore Browne, married Hugh Locke King who built the Brooklands motor racing circuit in England,
- His youngest son, Wilfrid Gore Browne was the first Bishop of Kimberley and Kuruman in South Africa.
- A daughter, Mabyl Gore Browne, lived with her brother Wilfrid for both adult their lives.

== Notes ==
Government offices
Preceded by Patrick Ross	Governor of Saint Helena; 1851–1855	Succeeded by Edward Hay Drummond Hay
Preceded by Sir George Grey	Governor of New Zealand; 1855–1861	Succeeded by Sir George Grey
Preceded by Sir Henry Young	Governor of Tasmania; 1862–1868	Succeeded by Charles Du Cane
