= Bible Society New Zealand =

Bible Society NZ's logo

Bible Society New Zealand is a Christian organisation dedicated to supplying bibles within New Zealand, and supporting Bible Societies around the world to do the same within their respective countries. They aim to serve the whole Christian community by working closely with churches to serve all denominations. The organisation has approximately 30 paid employees, and around 700 volunteers throughout New Zealand.

Bible Society New Zealand was established in 1846 and is a donor supported non-profit society that receives no Government funding and depends on prayers and financial support of Christian individuals and churches. It is a member of the United Bible Societies, a fellowship of 146 Bible Societies throughout the world which co-operate to make the Bible available to people everywhere in a language they can understand and at a price they can afford. In 2017, the Bible Society merged with Christian bookstore chain Manna Christian Stores to form the Bible Society New Zealand Group.

== Publishing ==
Bible Society New Zealand publishes a wide variety of non-denominational Scriptures and resources for churches and Christians to use. This includes leaflets for children and adults that tell the Christmas and Easter story and share Bible answers to life's questions, New Testaments for outreach, gospels for Easter camps, full waterproof Bibles for New Zealand Defence Force personnel, Christian story books for school and many more.

Sometimes Bible Society New Zealand initiates a publishing project and sees it through themselves, but more often they work with another organisation that has a particular need or audience, and partner to publish what they require for their outreach or ministry. The society also publishes Bibles for general reading, in English and a number of Pacific Island languages.

Due to being part of United Bible Societies, the world's largest Bible translating and publishing organisation, Bible Society New Zealand doesn't always have to do the publishing themselves. Through partnering with other Bible Societies, they are able to stock and distribute a huge range of Bibles and other material in most English Bible versions and in most other major languages.

Bible Society New Zealand is located in Wellington, New Zealand.

== History ==
In 1804 the British and Foreign Bible Society was established to provide the Bible to the public. The organisation was non-denominational and unlike most other groups published the Bible without any commentary. The society was a progressive one and in 1825 began publishing Bibles that contained the Apocrypha for Catholics. In 1831 the organisation removed the requirement for a prayer at its committee meetings and enabled Unitarians to serve on its committee. The Bible Society was responsible for publishing the Bibles used in New Zealand by the Church Missionary Society after William Colenso's printing press was unable to print the Bible.

In 1846 an Auckland based auxiliary of the Bible Society was founded by Wesleyan minister Walter Lawry, much like the society back in England, the New Zealand society had a commingled committee, with colonial treasurer Alexander Shepherd, Presbyterian William Comrie, Protector of the Aborigines and Congregationalist Thomas Forsaith. The initial committee however lacked Anglican representation. This was rectified by the second committee in 1850 of Wesleyan Joseph Horner Fletcher and Congregationalist John Rout, with Anglican Bishop William Williams serving as vice-president. The Bible Society focused on distribution of the Bible without commentary as a way to promote Christianity amongst apathetic settlers without favouring any specific denomination; however, the society was not well-supported by High Church Anglicans and was disregarded by Catholics, who consider the Bible to require interpretation from the Church. In 1861 Josiah Clifton Firth became honorary treasurer, a position he held for 20 years. 20 years after its founding Henry Hassell Lawry, son of Walter, became secretary and would hold that position for four decades. Around the same time the committee had representation from ministers of all Protestant denominations.

In 1850 Governor George Grey was appointed honorary president — Grey became one of the main donors of the society at the time. The role of honorary president remained that of the governor and governor-general until Catherine Tizard declined the role in the 1990s.

Despite the Britain-based society having a tolerant view of Catholicism this did not extend to the Auckland auxiliary: at the 1859 annual meeting Reverend Isaac Harding complained of the Catholic Bishop of Tahiti impeding the efforts of Protestant missionaries in the country, Harding then promoted a false report of biblioclasm from other branches of the society.

It is quite evident that the main impediment to the circulation of the Scriptures among the French Canadian population is the Roman Priesthood. Bible-burning is resorted to whenever the priest can overawe his credulous parishioners, yet it is not without its significance, that the very inveteracy of this opposition begins to astonish the people, who cannot understand the uneasiness of their priest on the advent of a colporteur, nor his unceasing hostility to the circulation of a book which he is unable to condemn when brought to him for inspection. Thus, God may employ the weapons of the adversary against himself, and cause the glorious Gospel of Jesus to triumph over the Papal Antichrist in this country.

Not all members however agreed with the anti-Catholic sentiment, with Governor Thomas Gore Browne expressing concern over the sentiment, which led to a great controversy and calls for him to be removed as governor by some Protestants.

In a military world first, the New Zealand Defence Force New Testament was published in 2013. Chaplain Class One Lance Lukin perceived a need for this project and contacted Bible Society New Zealand to make it happen. The New Testament is a purpose-made, waterproof, tear resistant, military book and is endorsed by renowned adventurer and former soldier, Bear Grylls. 5000 copies were printed and distributed to new recruits, and a reprint is in progress.

Other projects that Bible Society New Zealand has recently completed include reformatting of the Māori Bible published in 1952, and the first Tokelauan New Testament was launched in June 2009. Current projects include the first Māori Children's Bible to be completed by 2015, and a complete Tokelauan Bible due to be completed in 2016.

In 2017, Bible Society New Zealand merged with Manna Christian Stores to form the Bible Society New Zealand Group.

In March 2024, the Bible Society confirmed that it would be closing its Wellington office and reconsolidating its headquarters at its Auckland office that month.

== Manna Christian Stores ==
Manna Christian Stores' logo

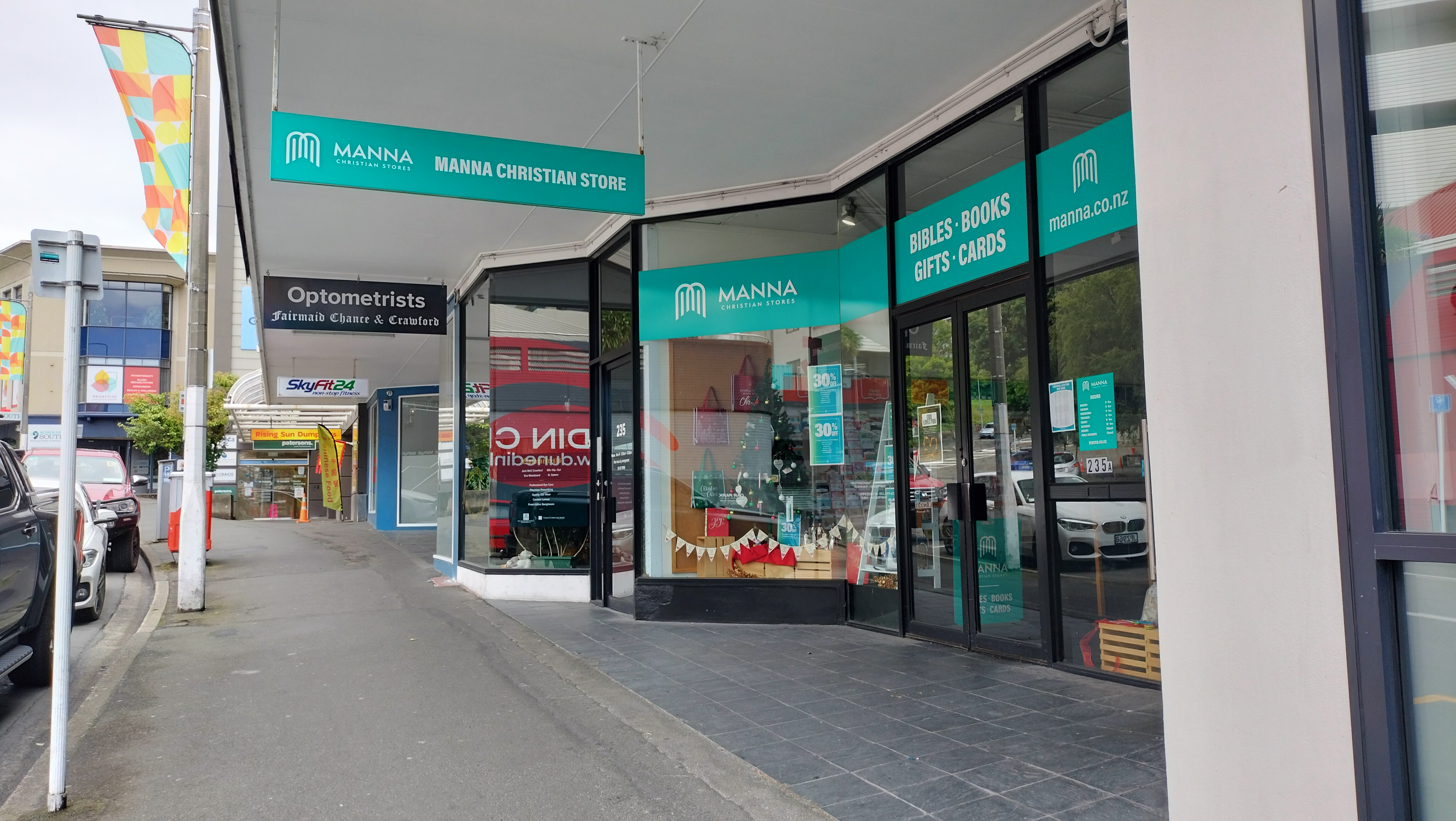
Manna bookshop in Dunedin

In 2017, the Bible Society New Zealand merged with the local Christian bookstore chain Manna Christian Stores. Manna Christian Stores was established in 1972 with a flagship shop in Invercargill. By March 2024, Manna had a network of 14 stores across New Zealand. Besides selling Bibles and Christian resources, Manna also partnered with local churches, mission groups and ran workshops and conferences to train leaders and lay believers. In November 2023, Bible Society NZ chief executive Neels Janse van Rensburg announced that the Society was exploring closing down several Manna stores including its flagship Invercargill store, citing rising building lease costs, international freight costs, logistics and rising paper prices. van Rensburg confirmed that the Society's board was exploring online sales or franchise developments as means of improving operating efficiencies.

In March 2024, the Bible Society New Zealand confirmed that it would be shutting three Manna stores that month and another three stores in May 2024. These included stores in Invercargill, Auckland and Hastings. The Bible Society also confirmed that Manna Christian Stores would be retaining its online store. The Bible Society had also approached local churches to buy several of its former stores in order to "preserve the essences of these community spaces" but was unsuccessful due to the high operating costs.

== Sources ==
- Lineham, Peter J. (1996). Bible & society : a sesquicentennial history of the Bible Society in New Zealand. Wellington, New Zealand: The Society and Daphne Brasell Associates Press. pp. ix, 302 p., : ill., ports., 24 cm. ISBN 0-908896-46-8.
- Comber, William Charles (1946). The Bible and the Bible Society in New Zealand, 1846-1946; The Māori Bible, and. The story of a Māori girl and her Gospel. Wellington, New Zealand: A.H. and A.W. Reed for the British and Foreign Bible Society, New Zealand. pp. 48 p., [3] p. of plates : ports, 24 cm.
- "New CEO for Bible Society in New Zealand". Waikato Times. 4 September 2006.
- Todd, Rebecca (7 August 2007). "Mouse entry to house of the Lord; CHURCH ONLINE". The Press.
