= Christina Lamb =

British journalist and author

Christina Lamb OBE
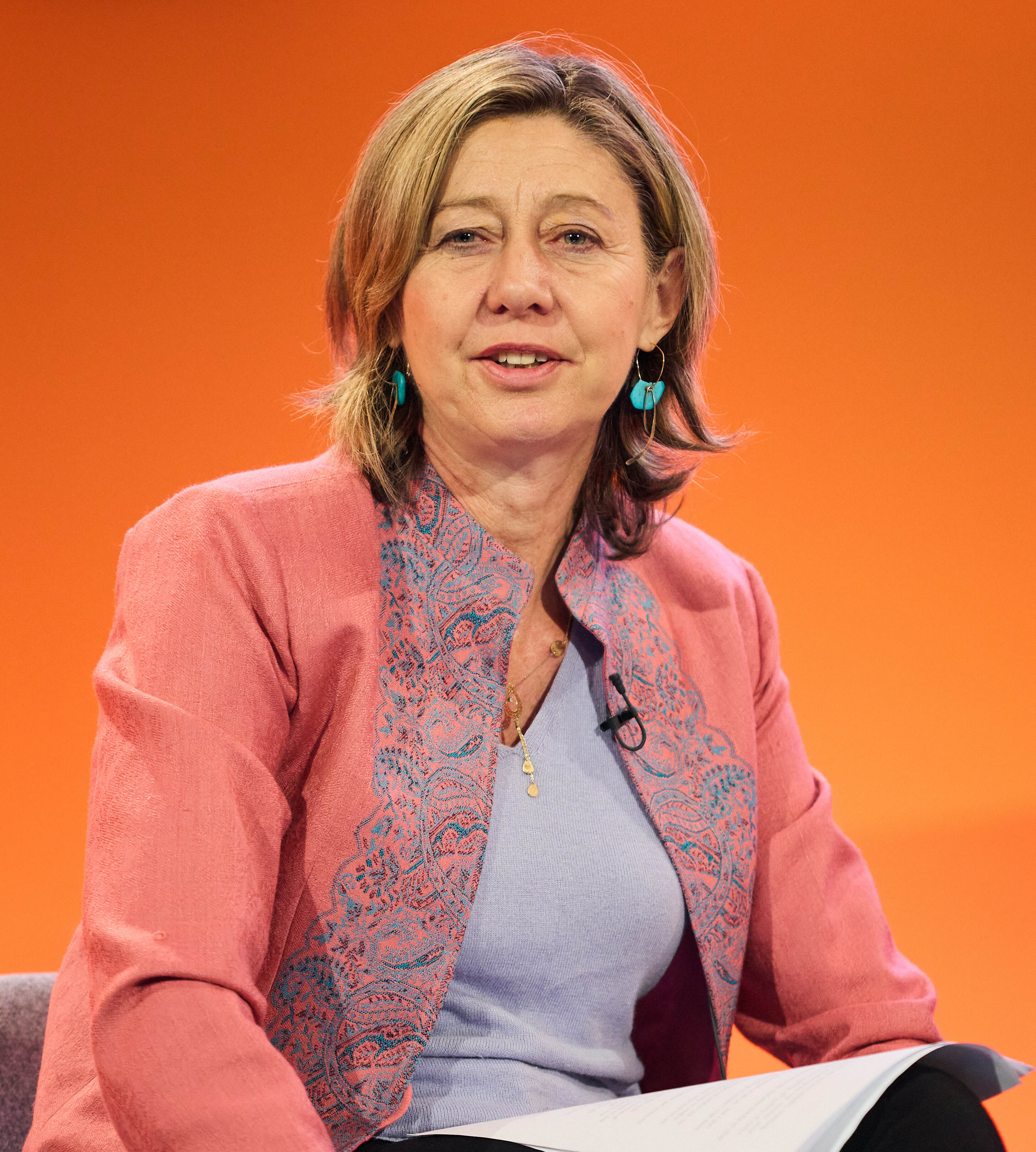
- Lamb in 2022
- Born: 15 May 1965 (age 61); London, United Kingdom
- Education: University College, Oxford
- Occupations: Journalist, author
- Spouse: Paulo Anunciação
- Children: 1
- Writing career
- Genre: Journalism
- Website: christinalamb.net

Christina Lamb OBE (born 15 May 1965) is a British journalist and author. She is the chief foreign correspondent of The Sunday Times.

Lamb has won nineteen major awards including five British Press Awards and the European Prix Bayeux-Calvados for war correspondents. She is an Honorary Fellow of University College, Oxford, a Fellow of the Royal Geographical Society and a Global Fellow for the Wilson Centre for International Affairs in Washington D.C. In 2013 she was appointed an OBE by Elizabeth II for services to journalism. In November 2018, Lamb received an honorary degree of Doctor of Laws from the University of Dundee.

She has written ten books including The Africa House and I Am Malala, co-written with Malala Yousafzai, which was named Popular Non-Fiction Book of the Year in the British National Book Awards 2013.

== Early life ==
Lamb was educated at Nonsuch High School for Girls, Cheam, and graduated with a BA in Philosophy, Politics, and Economics from the University of Oxford.

== Career ==
=== Journalism ===
As a journalist, Lamb travelled with the Mujahidin fighting the Soviet occupation, spending the next two years living in Peshawar. She has reported on Pakistan and Afghanistan for more than three decades.

Lamb has been based in Islamabad and Rio de Janeiro for the Financial Times and Johannesburg and Washington D.C. for The Sunday Times. She has covered wars from Iraq to Libya, Angola to Syria; repression from Eritrea to Zimbabwe; and journeyed to the far reaches of the Amazon to visit remote tribes. She pays particular attention to issues such as the girls abducted by Boko Haram in Nigeria, Yazidi sex slaves in Iraq, and the plight of Afghan women.

In November 2001, Lamb was deported from Pakistan after uncovering evidence of a covert operation by rogue elements in the ISI, Pakistan's military intelligence service, to smuggle arms to the Taliban. In 2006, she narrowly escaped with her life when caught in a Taliban ambush of British troops in Helmand. She was on Benazir Bhutto's bus when it was blown up in October 2007.

In April 2021, she wrote an article in The Sunday Times covering Prince Philip, Duke of Edinburgh's funeral in which she stated "Prince Philip was the longest serving royal consort in British history – an often crotchety figure, offending people with gaffes about slitty eyes, even if secretly we rather enjoyed them". In response to calls for a retraction of the article on the grounds that it was "trivialising racism", Sunday Times editor Emma Tucker apologised “for the offence caused”, stating that Lamb "never intended to make light of his remark in any way".

Lamb is a member of the international board of the Institute for War & Peace Reporting (IWPR) and is a Patron of the UK-registered charity Afghan Connection.

=== Books and plays ===
I Am Malala, an account of the life of main author Malala Yousafzai, has been translated into 40 languages, and has sold close to two million copies worldwide.

Her book Nujeen: One Girl's Incredible Journey from War-torn Syria in a Wheelchair co-written with Nujeen Mustafa, was published by William Collins (London) in September 2016 and was translated in nine languages. The book Nujeen inspired a five-movement cantata Everyday Wonders: The Girl from Aleppo written by Kevin Crossley-Holland (text) and Cecilia McDowall (music) first performed by The National Children's Choir of Great Britain in Birmingham Town Hall on 10 August 2018.

Lamb's book Our Bodies, Their Battlefield was published by William Collins (London) in March 2020 and by Scribner (New York) in September 2020 and was translated into 14 languages. Her latest book The Prince Rupert Hotel for the Homeless: A True Story of Love and Compassion Amid a Pandemic was published by William Collins (London) in June 2022.

Her first play Drones, Baby, Drones with Ron Hutchison was performed at London's Arcola Theatre in 2016.

=== Awards and recognition ===
In 1988, Lamb was awarded Young Journalist of the Year for her coverage of the Soviet occupation of Afghanistan.

In 2009, Lamb's portrait was on display in the Ashmolean Museum in Oxford. A photograph of her by Francesco Guidicini is in the Photographs Collection of the National Portrait Gallery. She inspired the character Esther in the novel The Zahir (2005) written by Paulo Coelho.

In 2017, she was the first female former undergraduate of University College, Oxford, to be elected an Honorary Fellow. The Fellowship was awarded in recognition of "her courageous, vivid and critically important journalism, as well as for her support of the College".

== Books ==
- Waiting for Allah: Pakistan's Struggle for Democracy (London: Hamish Hamilton, 1991. ISBN 978-0-670-87727-0)
- The Africa House: The True Story of an English Gentleman and His African Dream (London: Viking, 1999. ISBN 9780241130551)
- The Sewing Circles of Herat: My Afghan Years (London: HarperCollins, 2002. ISBN 9780007142521)
- House of Stone: The True Story of a Family Divided in War-Torn Zimbabwe (London: HarperCollins, 2006. ISBN 9780007219384)
- Small Wars Permitting: Dispatches from Foreign Lands (London: HarperPress, 2008. ISBN 9780007256891)
- I Am Malala: The Girl Who Stood Up for Education and was Shot by the Taliban co-written with Malala Yousafzai (London: Weidenfeld & Nicolson, 2013. ISBN 9780297870913)
- Farewell Kabul: From Afghanistan to a More Dangerous World (London: William Collins, 2015. ISBN 9780007256945)
- Nujeen: One Girl's Incredible Journey from War-torn Syria in a Wheelchair co-written with Nujeen Mustafa (London: William Collins, 2016. ISBN 9780062567734)
- Our Bodies, Their Battlefield: What War Does to Women (London: William Collins, 2020. ISBN 9780008300005)
- The Prince Rupert Hotel for the Homeless: A True Story of Love and Compassion Amid a Pandemic (London: William Collins, 2022. ISBN 978-0008487546)

== Awards ==
=== Journalism awards ===
- 1988 British Press Awards Young Journalist of the Year
- 1991 British Press Awards Reporter of the Year
- 1992 Amnesty International UK Media Awards, Winner, category Periodicals
- 2001 British Press Awards Foreign Reporter of the Year
- 2001 Foreign Press Association (London), Foreign Affairs Story of the Year
- 2002 BBC What the Papers Say Awards, Foreign Correspondent of the Year
- 2006 British Press Awards Foreign Reporter of the Year
- 2006 BBC What the Papers Say Awards, Foreign Correspondent of the Year
- 2007 BBC What the Papers Say Awards, Foreign Correspondent of the Year
- 2007 Foreign Press Association (London), Print & Web News Story of the Year
- 2009 Prix Bayeux-Calvados des correspondants de guerre Trophée Presse écrite
- 2015 Amnesty International UK Media Awards, Winner, category National Newspapers
- 2016 Foreign Press Association (London), Print & Web Feature Story of the Year
- 2017 Women on the Move Awards, The Sue Lloyd-Roberts Media Award
- 2019 British Press Awards Feature Writer of the Year
- 2022 Society of Editors Outstanding Contribution to Journalism Award
- 2022 Society of Editors Media Freedom Awards, Foreign Correspondent of the Year
- 2023 Amnesty International UK Media Awards, Winner, category Outstanding Impact
- 2024 Society of Editors Media Freedom Awards, Foreign Correspondent of the Year

=== Book awards ===
- 1999 John Llewellyn Rhys Prize, Finalist (The Africa House)
- 2003 Barnes & Noble Discover Great New Writers Award, Finalist (The Sewing Circles of Herat)
- 2013 Specsavers National Book Awards, Popular Non-Fiction Book of the Year (I Am Malala)
- 2013 Goodreads Choice Awards, Best Memoir & Autobiography (I Am Malala)
- 2014 Political Book Awards, Finalist, Political Book of the Year (I Am Malala)
- 2020 The Baillie Gifford Prize for Non-Fiction, shortlist (Our Bodies, Their Battlefield)
- 2021 PEN/John Kenneth Galbraith Award for Nonfiction, longlist (Our Bodies, Their Battlefield)
- 2021 New York Public Library Helen Bernstein Book Award for Excellence in Journalism, shortlist (Our Bodies, Their Battlefield)
- 2021 The Orwell Prize for Political Writing, shortlist (Our Bodies, Their Battlefield)
- 2021 The Witold Pilecki International Book Award, Winner (Our Bodies, Their Battlefield)
- 2023 The Ryszard Kapuściński Award, shortlist (Our Bodies, Their Battlefield)

=== Other awards ===
- Nieman Fellow at Harvard University in 1993/94
- Dart Center Ochberg Fellow in 2008.
- Recognised in She magazine as one of 'Britain's most inspirational women'.
- Recognised in Grazia as one of their 'icons of the decade'.
- Chosen by the ASHA foundation as one of their inspirational women worldwide.
- Included in Harper's Bazaar's list of 150 Visionary Women 2017 as 'one of the most influential female leaders in the UK'.
