= Stephen Kampyongo =

Zambian politician (born 1972)

Minister of Home Affairs
- In office September 2016 – August 2021
- President: Edgar Lungu (2016–2021)
- Preceded by: Davies Mwila
- Succeeded by: Jack Mwiimbu

Member of Parliament
- Incumbent
- Assumed office September 2011
- President: Michael Sata (2011-2014); Edgar Lungu (2015-2021)
- Constituency: Shiwa Ng'andu

Minister of Local Government and Housing
- In office October 2015 – September 2016
- President: Edgar Lungu
- Preceded by: John Phiri
- Succeeded by: Vincent Mwale

Personal details
- Born: June 12, 1972 (age 53)
- Party: Patriotic Front

Stephen Kampyongo (born 12 June 1972) is a Zambian politician who is the former Minister of Home Affairs of Zambia until August 2021. He was the Minister of Local Government and Housing in the first cabinet of Edgar Lungu after his election in 2015 following the death of Michael Sata.

He is a member of the Patriotic Front party.
