= Nujeen Mustafa =

Syrian refugee and activist

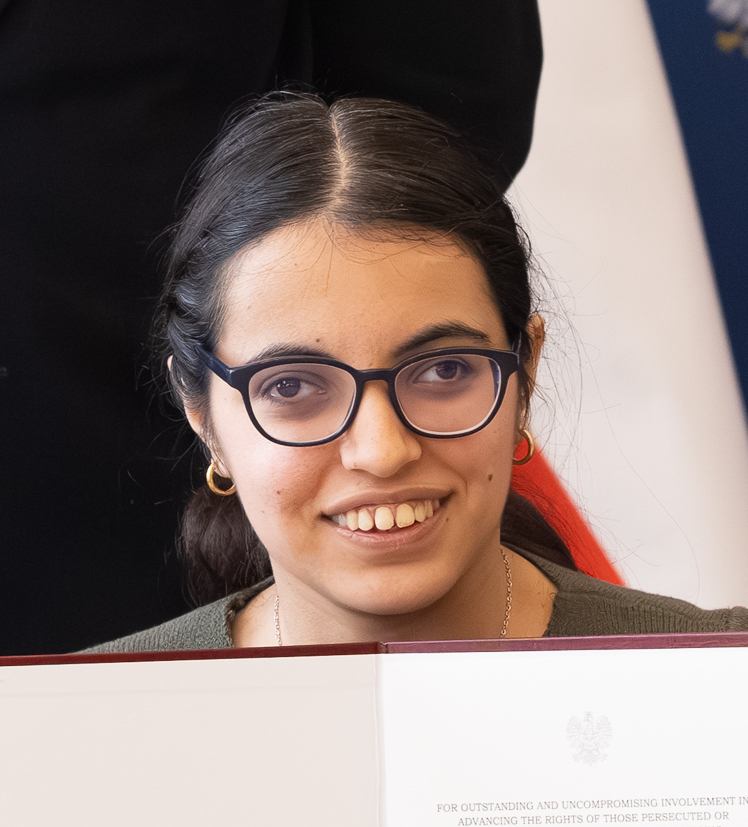
- Nujeen Mustafa (2026)
- Born: January 1, 1999 (age 27); Kobanî, Syria
- Known for: Traveling by wheelchair as a refugee, disability rights activism

Nujeen Mustafa (Arabic: نوجين مصطفى Nūjjayn Muṣṭafā; also transliterated Noujain Mustaffa) is a Kurdish Syrian refugee and activist with cerebral palsy. She was raised in Aleppo, Syria, and gained attention after traveling 3,500 miles (5,600 km) by wheelchair, fleeing conflict in the Syrian Civil War, before arriving and resettling in Germany. She was listed as one of the BBC's 100 Women in 2018, and her story was featured on the television show Last Week Tonight with John Oliver. In 2019 she became the first disabled person to brief the United Nations Security Council and was the recipient of the Alison Des Forges Award for Extraordinary Activism from Human Rights Watch. She has co-authored two books about her experiences. She resides in Wesseling where she attends a school for those with disabilities.

== Life ==
Mustafa was raised in Kobane, Syria, with her sisters and brother as part of a Kurdish family. Her father, who is unable to read, sold sheep and goats while her brother dug water wells. She was born with cerebral palsy and spent the majority of her life "confined to her family's fifth-floor apartment in Aleppo." According to reporting by National Geographic, their building had no elevator, and so leaving the apartment could only be accomplished by having someone carry her to the ground floor. She later compared the situation to being under house arrest:

For me, it meant not being able to go to school, hang out with friends or go to the cinema ... Having a disability in Syria often means that you are hidden away. You confront shame, discrimination and physical barriers. You are someone who is pitied.

Mustafa could not attend school while in Syria, as there were no facilities to accommodate those with disabilities. She learned English from watching television, including the American soap opera Days of Our Lives.

Beginning in 2014, at age 16, Mustafa traveled 3,500 miles (5,600 km) from Syria to Gaziantep in Turkey, and finally Germany as a refuge from the Syrian Civil War. Without the money to travel as a family, her parents remained in Turkey while she and her sister Nasrine continued to Germany, where her brother was already living. For the length of the trip, Mustafa traveled in a wheelchair with her sister pushing her. She traveled, in her own words, as a "pay-as-you-go refugee", meaning that she did not have enough money to pay smugglers to take her the entire way, and had to find new ways to progress each day, from taxis to trains in addition to smugglers. The trip in its entirety cost around €6,000.

She was granted asylum by Germany in late 2016. As of 2017 she lived in Wesseling and attended a school for those with disabilities.

== Activism and recognition ==
Mustafa gained attention during her journey to Europe as a so-called "refugee celebrity", as she was interviewed by journalists while en route.

In 2018, Mustafa was listed as one of the BBC's 100 Women. In 2019 she became the first person with a disability to brief the United Nations Security Council on her experiences during the war in Syria and policy regarding disabled persons. She has also given talks at the Palace of Nations in Geneva, TEDx in Iraq and the United Kingdom, and the presentation of the Nansen Refugee Award in 2017.

In February 2019, Mustafa was announced as the winner of the Alison Des Forges Award for Extraordinary Activism, given out by Human Rights Watch, which cited the role her story played in helping to "move policymakers in the European Union" on the issue of the delivery of humanitarian aid to those with disabilities. She accepted the award at a ceremony in Australia in April of the same year.

=== Last Week Tonight ===
In 2015, Mustafa was featured on a segment of the television show Last Week Tonight hosted by John Oliver, covering the treatment of refugees, and which included segments from interviews she had given to the BBC. The segment also featured a one-off scene between Days of Our Lives characters EJ DiMera and Sami Brady. These had been reported as Mustafa's favorite characters in the show, and the former had been killed off in a previous episode. The character EJ addressed Mustafa, recognizing the difficulty of her journey as a refugee and calling her "our kind of people".

== Publications ==
Mustafa has published two books, both co-authored with British journalist and writer Christina Lamb:

- Mustafa, Nujeen; Lamb, Christina (10 October 2017). The Girl from Aleppo: Nujeen's Escape from War to Freedom. Harper Wave. ISBN 978-0-06-282125-6.
- Mustafa, Nujeen; Lamb, Christina (11 October 2016). Nujeen: One Girl's Journey from War-Torn Syria in a Wheelchair. Harper Wave. ISBN 978-0-06-256775-8.

== See also ==
- Disability rights movement
- European migrant crisis
- List of refugees
- Malala Yousafzai, Pakistani activist, also co-author with Christina Lamb
- Refugees of the Syrian Civil War
