= Eileen Olive Deste =

New Zealand photographer

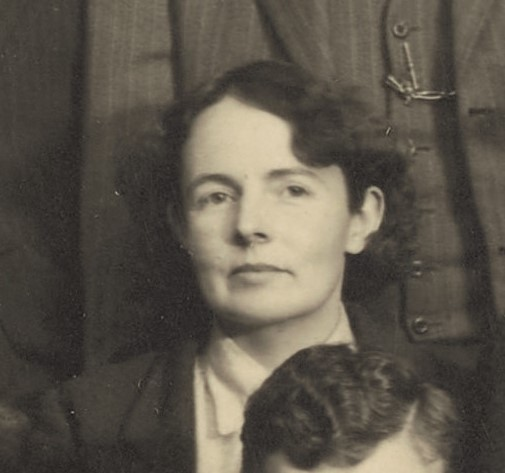
- Born: 16 June 1908; London Borough of Croydon
- Died: 2 March 1986 (aged 77)
- Occupation: Professional photographer

Eileen Olive Deste (16 June 1909 – 2 March 1986) was a New Zealand photographer. Deste was heavily involved in photographing the New Zealand Centennial Exhibition.

== Biography ==
Eileen Olive Leach was born in Croydon, Surrey, England, on 16 June 1909. As a young woman she moved to London, England, where she became a jewelry photographer for Cartier’s. Around this time she took on the professional last name of Deste.

She emigrated to New Zealand in the early 1930s. She set up a business initially in Dunedin, then studios in a variety of locations in Wellington.

In 1938 Deste was selected to be the official photographer to the New Zealand Centennial Exhibition to be held in Wellington in 1939 and 1940. She documented all aspects of the exhibition from construction to closing. She was also involved with creating photographic souvenirs of the Centennial.

In 1943 she returned to England. She set up a studio in London, specializing in portraiture and photographing art work. She also documented a variety of architectural subjects; industrial chimneys, prison doors and pottery kilns. She became a lifelong friend of writer and traveler Guy Arnold who lived in the flat above her in Marylebone.

She died on 2 March 1986 in London. Over 2,000 of her photographs are held in the Historic England archive.
