= Weidenfeld & Nicolson =

British publisher

- Parent company: Orion Publishing Group
- Founded: 1949
- Founder: George Weidenfeld and Nigel Nicolson
- Country of origin: United Kingdom
- Headquarters location: London
- Publication types: Books
- Nonfiction topics: History, biography, celebrity, fiction, illustrated books.
- Fiction genres: Fiction; non-fiction
- Official website: orionbooks.co.uk

Weidenfeld & Nicolson Ltd (established 1949), often shortened to W&N or Weidenfeld, is a British publisher of fiction and reference books. It has been a division of the French-owned Orion Publishing Group since 1991.

== History ==
George Weidenfeld and Nigel Nicolson founded Weidenfeld & Nicolson in 1949 with a reception at Brown's Hotel, London. Among many other significant books, it published Vladimir Nabokov's Lolita (1959) and Nicolson's Portrait of a Marriage (1973), a frank biography of his mother Vita Sackville-West and father Harold Nicolson. In its early years Weidenfeld also published nonfiction works by Isaiah Berlin, Hugh Trevor-Roper, and Rose Macaulay, and novels by Mary McCarthy and Saul Bellow. Later it published titles by world leaders and historians, along with contemporary fiction and glossy illustrated books. Weidenfeld & Nicolson acquired the publisher Arthur Baker Ltd in 1959, and ran it as an imprint into the 1990s.

Weidenfeld was one of Orion's first acquisitions after the group's founding in 1991, and formed the core of its offerings. At that time Weidenfeld imprints included Phoenix, its own much earlier establishment; and J. M. Dent, acquired in 1988 along with its Everyman series. Orion was acquired in turn by Hachette Livre in 1998. The hardcover rights to Everyman's Library were sold in 1991, and survive as a Random House property; paperbacks of Everyman Classics continued under Orion. In January 2002, Cassell imprints, including the Cassell Reference and Cassell Military were joined with the Weidenfeld imprints to form a new division under the name of Weidenfeld & Nicolson.

Late in 2013, W&N published the British edition (and Hachette subsidiary Little, Brown the American edition) of I Am Malala, the memoir of Pakistani-born teenager Malala Yousafzai with Christina Lamb. Yousafzai is a female education activist, and the Nobel Peace Prize winner in 2014.

== Book series ==
- Illustrated Novel Library
- Lives
- Pleasures and Treasures
- The Young Historian Books (Series Editor: Patrick Moore)
- World University Library
