= Harriet Louisa Browne =

Political hostess, community leader, letter-writer

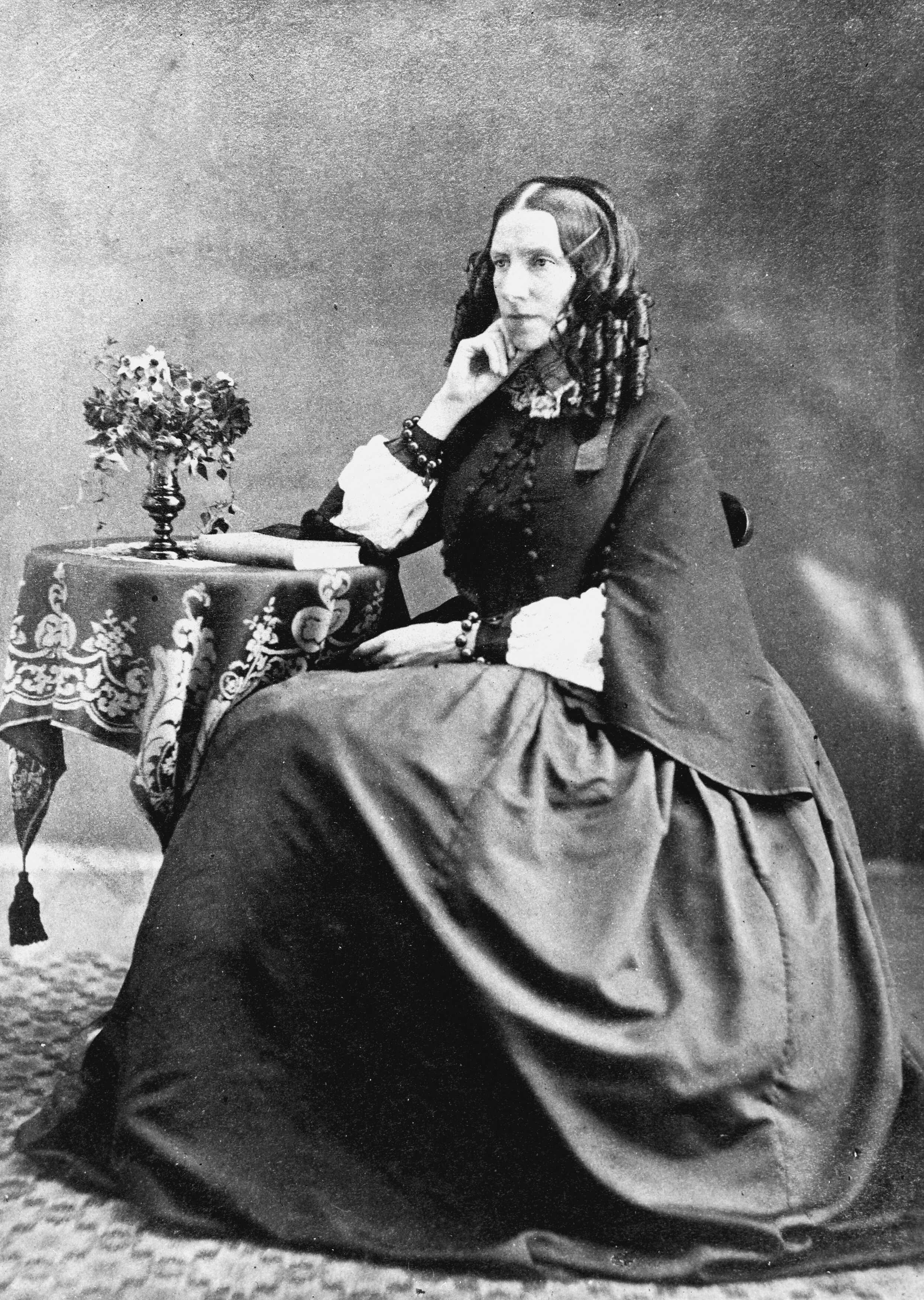
Harriet Louisa Browne, circa 1869.

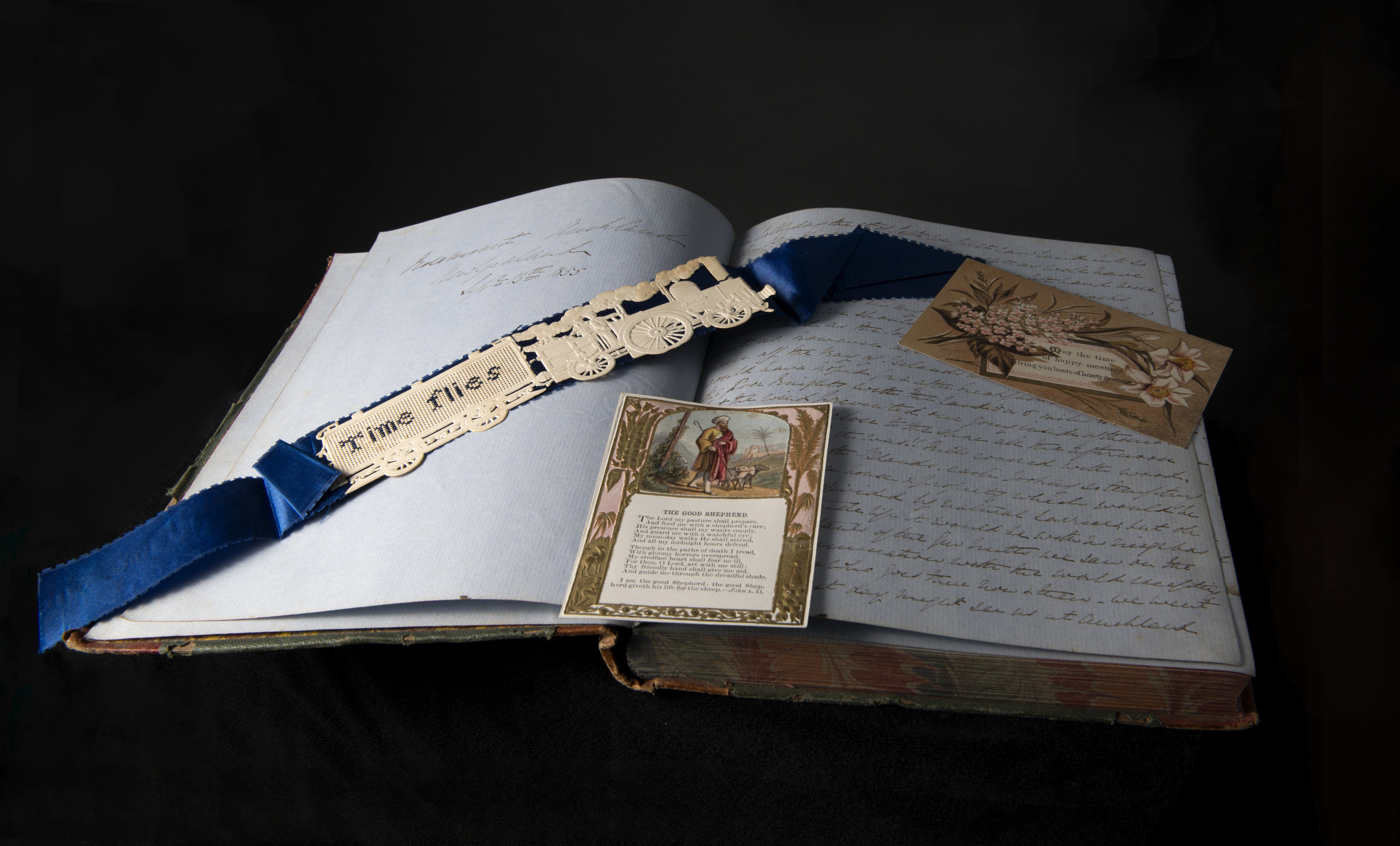
Diary of Harriet Louisa Browne, 1855 (ADCZ 17007 W5601/1). Photo by Archives New Zealand, 2013.

Harriet Louisa Browne (1 July 1829–9 April 1906) was a political salon hostess, community leader and letter-writer in New Zealand. She was born in Edinburgh, Midlothian, Scotland.

She was married to Thomas Robert Gore Browne, governor of New Zealand in 1855–1861 and Tasmania in 1861–1868, and exerted an acknowledged influence over his policy during his office. Browne was over 20 years her husband's junior and was well read, socially accomplished with a pleasant personality, and had an excellent understanding of the political environment in which she and her husband circulated. In addition to her influence over her husband, her hospitality and contribution to the social and cultural life during her husband's placements assisted him in influencing others to support his political views.

Harriet's diaries, scrapbooks, and correspondence with her husband are kept by Archives New Zealand and Alexander Turnbull Library.

She died in Weybridge, Surrey, England on 9 April 1906.
