= Ngandu (name) =

Ngandu, N’gandu or Ng'andu is an African name that may refer to:

- Ngandu Kasongo (born 1979), Congolese football player
- Ng'andu Peter Magande (1947–2023), Zambian economist and politician
- Canaan Ngandu (born c.1972), Zimbabwean sculptor
- Pius Ngandu Nkashama (1946–2023), writer, playwright, poet and literary critic from Democratic Republic of the Congo
