= Ethel Locke King =

British motor-racing promoter and hospital patron (1864–1956)

Dame Ethel Locke King, DBE (née Gore Browne; 1864–1956), sometimes incorrectly written as Locke-King, was a British motor-racing promoter and hospital patron.

Her wealthy husband, Hugh Locke King, created and solely financed Brooklands, in Weybridge, Surrey, the first permanent motor racing track in the world. She took over the supervisory role of the track's development after the stress of building it made her husband too ill to continue in the role. On 17 June 1907, she led the inaugural procession of cars on to the track in her open Itala minutes after the track had been opened by her husband.

== Early life ==
She was born Ethel Gore Browne at Government House in Tasmania, the daughter of Sir Thomas Gore Browne, the then Governor of Tasmania. In 1884 aged 20 she married Hugh F. Locke King, and they settled at Weybridge, Surrey. With her husband's interest in motor racing, they built the Brooklands race-track.

== First World War ==
Ethel Locke King ran a Red Cross hospital at her estate, Brooklands House, during World War I from 1915 until 1919 and organised the Voluntary Aid Detachment in Surrey in 12 hospitals, mainly in houses belonging to her husband. For her work during the war she was appointed Dame Commander of the Order of the British Empire (DBE) in 1918.

== Later life ==
Following the death of her husband in 1926 Locke King continued to farm the estate and having success with Guernsey cattle. She died at Brooklands on 5 August 1956, aged 92.

== Mena House ==
Mena House in Egypt was purchased by Hugh and Ethel Locke King; once they had settled into the former Khedivial Hunting Lodge, she decided to turn it into a luxurious hotel.

"It was to be an hotel to end all hotels", wrote Nina Nelson "... With plenty of money at their disposal, it was enlarged yet again and the Locke Kings set about turning it into the quintessence of comfort [including fire-places to warm up the cold winter nights], but with fittings, architecture and decoration remaining oriental in design".

A friend of the Locke Kings, Alice Gress, visited the hotel shortly after its opening; Alice thought the area to the south would be a wonderful addition to the grounds as a golf course and sketched a rough course plan on a napkin. Hugh Locke King developed the area, building a sporting club and lounge at the base of the pyramids to serve the nine-fairway, 18-green course with interlocking canals and palm trees lining the fairways.

Ethel Locke King was a paternal aunt of Lieutenant-Colonel Sir Stewart Gore-Browne.
