= I Am Malala =

Book by Malala Yousafzai

I Am Malala: The Story of the Girl Who Stood Up for Education and was Shot by the Taliban
- Book cover
- Author: Malala Yousafzai; Christina Lamb
- Language: English
- Subject: Autobiography
- Publisher: Weidenfeld & Nicolson (UK); Little, Brown and Company (US)
- Publication date: 8 October 2013
- Publication place: United Kingdom; United States
- Pages: 288
- ISBN: 978-0-29787-091-3
- OCLC: 1407766175
- Dewey Decimal: 371.8
- LC Class: LC2330

I Am Malala: The Story of the Girl Who Stood Up for Education and was Shot by the Taliban is an autobiographical book by Malala Yousafzai, co-written with Christina Lamb. It was published on 8 October 2013, by Weidenfeld & Nicolson in the UK and Little, Brown and Company in the US.

The book details the early life of Yousafzai, her father's ownership of schools and activism, the rise and fall of the Tehrik-i-Taliban Pakistan in Swat Valley and the assassination attempt made against Yousafzai on 9 October 2012, when she was aged 15, following her activism for female education. It received a positive critical reception and won several awards, though it has been banned in many schools in Pakistan.

== Synopsis ==
Part One covers Malala Yousafzai's life "Before the Taliban". She describes her childhood home Swat Valley. Named after Malalai of Maiwand, Yousafzai lived with her father Ziauddin, her mother Toor Pekai, and two younger brothers, Khushal and Atal. Ziauddin's father, Rohul Amin, was an imam and a teacher. Ziauddin studied for a Master's in English at Jehanzeb College. He opened the Khushal School with a partner, Naeem, who later left due to financial difficulties. Ziauddin found a new partner, Hidayatullah, with whom the school slowly began to make a profit. As Ziauddin began to open more schools, Toor Pekai would bring children in need to live with them, and Ziauddin would give free places in his schools to poor children. Yousafzai describes the changing political regimes in Pakistan, including the first drone strikes in Pakistan in 2004 following the September 11 attacks.

Part Two, "The Valley of Death", details the rise of the Tehrik-i-Taliban Pakistan in Swat. In 2006, Fazlullah began a popular "Radio Mullah" broadcast which initially gave advice on such matters as ritual ablutions and drug abstinence, but progressed into the condemnation of music and dancing, and instruction on women staying in the home. The book also describes the continuing War in North-West Pakistan, and the return of Benazir Bhutto in Pakistan which culminated in her assassination. The Taliban began to commit further murders such as that of Shabana, and Ziauddin Yousafzai continued outspoken activism. During the First Battle of Swat, Malala began to write a BBC Urdu blog under the pseudonym "Gul Mukai". Her school is shut down following a Taliban edict in 2009, and her family is forced to move to Shangla for three months.

Part Three is entitled "Three Bullets, Three Girls". By August 2009, the army has fought off the Taliban in Swat, and the Yousafzai family return. Malala's school re-opens, and she visits Islamabad with school friends, meeting with Major General Athar Abbas and giving a public speech. With her father, Yousafzai speaks at many interviews, critical of the Taliban and the army's ineffectiveness. The 2010 Pakistan floods devastate Swat, destroying buildings and leaving many without food, clean water and electricity. In the rest of the country, CIA agent Raymond Davis murders two men and the Americans kill bin Laden, leading to widespread mistrust of American influence in Pakistan by the public. In late 2011, Yousafzai begins to receive prizes for her activism. She travels to Karachi to talk to Geo TV, also visiting the mausoleum of Muhammad Ali Jinnah. Yousafzai receives death threats, which worries her parents. Following the shooting of Zahid Khan in August 2012, Ziauddin expected to be targeted next. Malala also begins to fear an attack on her. She studies hard for her exams, staying up late at night. After her Pakistan Studies paper on 9 October, two men stop her bus and come aboard. One shouts, "Who is Malala?" and shoots three bullets.

Part Four is named "Between Life and Death". One bullet travelled from Yousafzai's left eye to her shoulder, and her friends Shazia and Kainat were also non-fatally injured. Yousafzai's father gave a speech with the Association of Private Schools before rushing to the hospital, while Yousafzai's mother was learning to read and rushed home to pray. Malala was taken by helicopter to the Combined Military Hospital in Peshawar and then airlifted to a military hospital in Rawalpindi. Yousafzai was taken on 15 October to Queen Elizabeth Hospital in Birmingham, aboard a United Arab Emirates jet, but her father refused to come as the rest of the family could not travel without passports.

Part Five is called "A Second Life". Yousafzai woke up in Birmingham on 16 October and spent the following days obsessed with the location of her father, and not being able to afford medical treatment, though the Pakistani government was covering costs. Yousafzai received 8000 cards and many presents. When she awoke, she was confused about all the cards she had received, as there was supposed to be a news blackout in Pakistan so no one would know anything had happened to her or where she was being taken, but someone had seen her being flown out to the UK, and word got around quickly. Her family finally arrived on 25 October. The day her family got to the hospital was also the first day since arriving in Birmingham that she had any access to windows. Malala had not seen the city she was being kept in for 10 days. She underwent surgery on 11 November to repair her facial nerve; in January 2013, she was discharged, and in February she received surgery to get a cochlear implant. Yousafzai lives in Birmingham, though she misses Swat, and plans to continue her activism so she can be known not as "the girl who was shot by the Taliban" but as "the girl who fought for education".

== Reception ==
According to Publishers Weekly, in 2017 the book had sold almost 2 million copies, and there were 750,000 copies of the children's edition in print. In March 2018, The Bookseller reported that 328,000 copies of the book had been sold in the UK, netting over £2.47 million.

=== Accolades ===
- 2013 Specsavers National Book Awards, Popular Non-Fiction Book of the Year
- 2013 Goodreads Choice Awards, Best Memoir & Autobiography
- 2014 Political Book Awards, Finalist, Political Book of the Year

=== Critical reviews ===
Sayeeda Warsi, writing for The Daily Telegraph, giving the book four stars out of five, wrote "Malala has turned a tragedy into something positive". Entertainment Weekly gave the book a "B+", writing "Malala's bravely eager voice can seem a little thin here, in I Am Malala, likely thanks to her co-writer, but her powerful message remains undiluted." Metro list the book as one of the "20 best non-fiction books of 2013", praising that Yousafzai's story is "one of idealism and stubborn courage".

In The Observer, the reviewer Yvonne Roberts praised Lamb for ensuring "the teenager's voice is never lost", and summarises that "this extraordinary schoolgirl's words are a reminder of all that is best in human nature". Fatima Bhutto in The Guardian called the book "fearless" and stated that "the haters and conspiracy theorists would do well to read this book", though she criticised "the stiff, know-it-all voice of a foreign correspondent" that is interwoven with Yousafzai's. In The Spectator, the journalist Owen Bennett-Jones describes Yousafzai's story as "astonishing", and writes that "as the story progresses, Malala’s voice definitely cuts through, clear and defiant". Marie Arana in The Washington Post called the book "riveting" and wrote "It is difficult to imagine a chronicle of a war more moving, apart from perhaps the diary of Anne Frank."

=== Response in Pakistan ===
The All Pakistan Private School's Federation announced that the book would be banned in its 152,000 member institutions, stating that it disrespected Islam and could have a "negative" influence. Pakistani investigative editor Ansar Abbasi described her work as "providing her critics something 'concrete' to prove her as an 'agent' of the West against Islam and Pakistan".

Following the book's release, the Pakistani Taliban released a statement threatening to kill Yousafzai, and target bookshops which sell the book.

The book, however, continues to be available in leading bookstores. It remains a popular reading among educated people especially young girls. Some schools, in fact, encourage students to read this book by keeping it in their libraries. Pakistan does not have a high literacy rate, and therefore, the popularity or otherwise of any literature is always subject to how the educated people have received it.

== Release details ==
I Am Malala was published on 8 October 2013, by Weidenfeld & Nicolson in the UK and Little, Brown and Company in the US. The book has been translated into more than 40 languages.

A children's edition of the memoir was published in 2014 under the title I Am Malala: How One Girl Stood Up for Education and Changed the World. The audio book edition, narrated by Neela Vaswani, won the 2015 Grammy Award for Best Children's Album.
