= Shiwang'andu District =

Coordinates: 10°59′S 31°42′E

- District
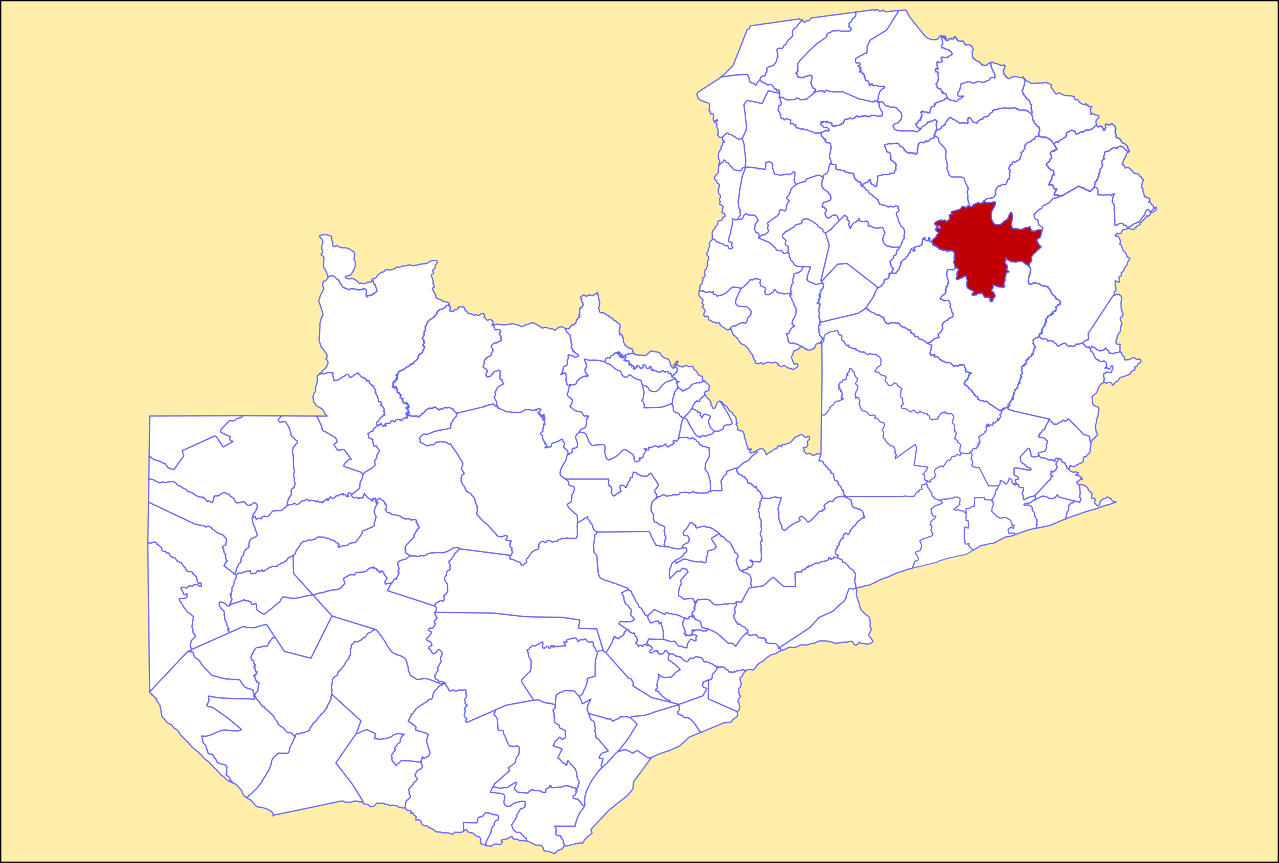
- District location in Zambia
- Country: Zambia
- Province: Muchinga Province

Area
  - Total: 9,350.1 km^{2} (3,610.1 sq mi)

Population (2022)
  - Total: 78,509
  - Density: 8.3966/km^{2} (21.747/sq mi)
- Time zone: UTC+2 (CAT)

Shiwang'andu District is a district of Muchinga Province, Zambia. It was created in February 2013 by splitting Chinsali District. It is named after Lake Ishiba Ng'andu and the district also contains the Shiwa Ngandu Estate. As of the 2022 Zambian Census, the district had a population of 78,509 people.
