= Lake Ishiba Ng'andu =

Lake in Zambia

- Location within Zambia Location within Africa
- Location: Shiwa Ng'andu District, Muchinga Province, Zambia
- Coordinates: 11°14′S 31°44′E
- Basin countries: Zambia
- Max. length: 5 km (3.1 mi)
- Max. width: 1.5 km (0.93 mi)

Lake Ishiba Ng'andu is a lake close to the watershed between the Luangwa and Chambeshi River basins in the Muchinga Province of Zambia, on the Chambeshi side. Its name in the Bemba language means 'lake of the royal crocodile'. It measures about 5 by 1.5 kilometres (3.11 mi × 0.93 mi).

It is important to the Bemba people as the country in which, in the late 17th Century, Chitimukulu of the Ng'andu (crocodile) Clan came across a dead crocodile, and taking this as an omen, settled his people after their wanderings from the Lunda Kingdom 1,000 kilometres (620 mi) to the east. The lake was visited by missionary explorer David Livingstone, whose dog was taken by a crocodile there. The area supported large populations of game animals until the middle of the 20th century.

In the early 20th century, it was the inspiration for the nearby Shiwa Ngandu estate built by Stewart Gore-Browne, who used a variant spelling of the name.
