= Afghan Connection =

British charity working in Afghanistan

Afghan Connection is a UK-registered charity working in Afghanistan. The charity aims to improve access to education for Afghan children. Working with partners, Afghan Connection has built 39 schools, which currently educate more than 50,000 children. The charity also trains Afghan teachers, to ensure the sustainability of the schools and improve the nation's long-term educational prospects.

In addition, Afghan Connection runs a cricket project for schoolchildren, both girls and boys. The project is supported and sponsored by the Marylebone Cricket Club (MCC) and has achieved positive results through building pitches, running training camps and training coaches.

== History ==
Dr. Sarah Fane OBE founded Afghan Connection in 2002. Drawing from her experience as a wartime doctor in Afghanistan, when she had witnessed the Afghan population suffering from lack of proper infrastructure, medical facilities and education.

=== Health and Education ===
Initially, Afghan Connection set out to provide much needed medical equipment and training, supporting vaccination programmes responsible for immunising over 72,000 women and children every year.

Education has now become the charity's primary focus. Each year, Afghan Connection aims to fund two school constructions, in addition to supporting 40 community schools through the provision of educational equipment and staff training. The charity also routinely provides latrines, a well and a surrounding wall for girls’ schools.

In 2011, the charity launched the Worsaj Education Project in the Takhar Province of North Eastern Afghanistan. The initiative was designed to focus resources on a smaller geographic area to create more dramatic results on a shorter time scale. The impact of the project in Worsaj has been remarkable and the charity has been asked to support educational development in the neighbouring district of Rustaq.

=== Sport ===
Since 2008, the charity has built cricket pitches at 38 schools. In 2012 alone, Afghan Connection's cricket project built pitches for 16,000 children in 10 schools across 8 provinces. The charity aims to build 10 new pitches every year, and has received support from donors like The Guardian.

== Partners ==
- The Swedish Committee for Afghanistan
- The Marylebone Cricket Club Foundation
- The Afghan Youth Cricket Support Organisation

== Pro-Bono Partners ==
- White and Case LLP
- Dechert LLP
