= The Africa House =

1999 biography by Christina Lamb

- First edition cover
- Author: Christina Lamb
- Language: English
- Genre: Biography, Travel
- Publisher: Viking Penguin
- Publication date: 1999 Hardcover; 01 Jun 2000 Paperback
- Publication place: United Kingdom
- Media type: Print (Hardcover and paperback)
- Pages: 380 (hardcover edition); 400 (Paperback edition)
- ISBN: 978-0-670-87727-0 (hardcover edition); 978-0-14-026834-8 (Penguin)
- OCLC: 40754887
- Preceded by: Waiting for Allah

The Africa House is a 1999 biography by British journalist and writer Christina Lamb. The book is subtitled The True Story of an English Gentleman and His African Dream, and was published in London in 1999 by Viking Penguin.

== Synopsis ==
The Africa House is an account of the life of soldier, pioneer white settler, politician and supporter of African independence Stewart Gore-Browne in relation to the building of his estate Shiwa Ngandu in Northern Rhodesia, now Zambia. Originating with a chance encounter in 1996 with Gore-Browne's grandson in Lusaka, the book uses Gore-Browne's diaries, letters, personal papers and photographs as well as those of his family, and interviews with family and friends, as its sources.

== Reception ==
Critical reception for The Africa House was mixed to positive.

The Seattle Times praised The Africa House, calling it 'a stunning description of a time, a place, a man and two countries' politics'.

The Independent called the book a 'marvellous story' but criticized Lamb for 'the maddening device of putting feelings into people's minds' as well as stating that many of the pictures were 'printed too small to be easily identifiable'. Kirkus Reviews wrote that the book was 'a cautionary but sympathetic story of a man obsessed, though less perniciously than most'.

In an article for New Statesman, Graham Boynton positively reviewed The Africa House, writing that it 'is an important book, since not only does it tell the story of an extraordinary character but it also helps explain the place of the white man in Africa'.

Publishers Weekly gave a mixed review for The Africa House, saying the book was 'engaging and well crafted, although Lamb's attempts at dramatizing her subjects' emotional lives sometimes read like a romance novel, and her narrow focus on the house's history obscures the wider context of waning British empire'.
