= Society of Editors =

Nonprofit organisation in the United Kingdom

- Formation: April 1999; 25 years ago
- Merger of: Guild of Editors & Association of the British Editors
- Executive Director: Dawn Alford
- Website: www.societyofeditors.org

The Society of Editors is an industry body for around 400 UK national and regional media editors, representatives and organisations.

== History and organization ==
The Society has an elected president, chair and board of directors. It was formed by a merger of the Guild of Editors and the Association of the British Editors in April 1999. Its stated aim is "to influence debate on press and broadcasting freedom, ethics and the culture and business of news media." Its founding executive director was Bob Satchwell, former long-standing editor of the Cambridge News and its current executive director is Dawn Alford.

The Society engages in lobbying, campaigning and facilitating professional development on behalf of the news media industry in the UK.

== Response to Oprah with Meghan and Harry ==
On 10 March 2021, Ian Murray, the executive editor of the group, was interviewed by Victoria Derbyshire on BBC News. Contradicting claims made by Prince Harry during Oprah with Meghan and Harry, Murray said that "the UK media is not bigoted and will not be swayed from its vital role holding the rich and powerful to account". In response to this, several news organisations withdrew from the society's Press Awards, as did ITV presenter Charlene White, who had been due to host the event. More than 160 journalists also issued statements, disagreeing with Murray's claims. Murray resigned the following day. The Bureau of Investigative Journalism stated that the society's "statement denying bigotry and racism in the UK media shows a lack of awareness and understanding of deep-rooted and persistent problems that we see".
