= Shiwa Ngandu =

English-style country house and estate in Zambia

Coordinates: 11°11′42″S 31°44′13″E

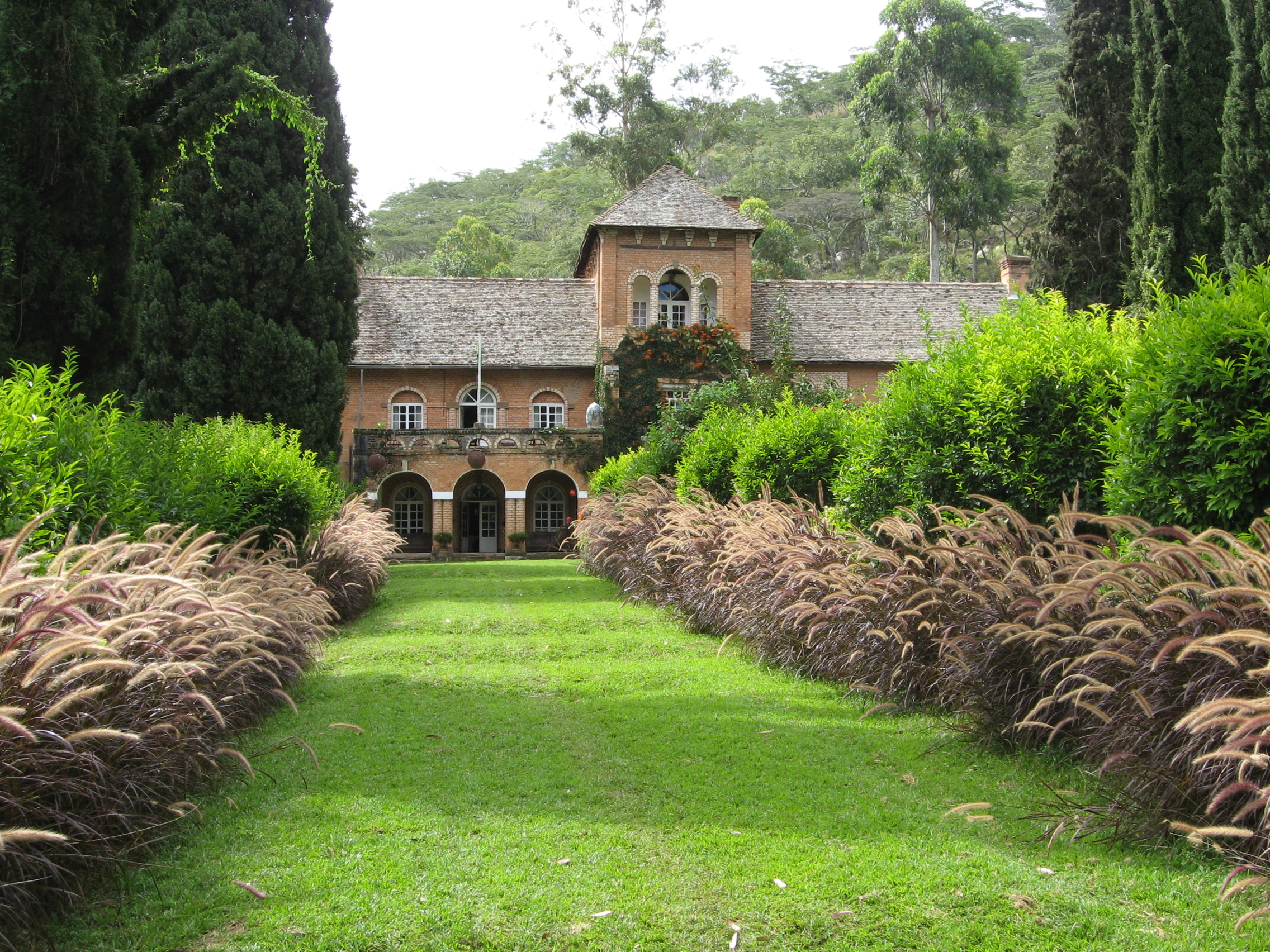
The house at Shiwa Ngandu, built by Sir Stewart Gore-Browne

Shiwa Ngandu (also spelled Shiwa Ng'andu) is an English-style country house and estate in Shiwang'andu District in the Muchinga Province of Zambia, previously in the Northern Province, about 12 kilometres (7 1/2 miles) west of the nearby Great North Road between Mpika and Chinsali. Its name is based on a small lake nearby, Lake Ishiba Ng'andu which in the Bemba language means 'lake of the royal crocodile'. The house itself is also known as "Shiwa House". It was the lifelong project of English aristocrat Sir Stewart Gore-Browne, who fell in love with the country after working on the Anglo-Belgian Boundary Commission determining the border between Rhodesia and the Democratic Republic of Congo.

== Decision to settle at Shiwa Ngandu ==
From his boyhood, Gore-Browne had an ambition to own an estate like that of his aunt, Dame Ethel Locke King, at Weybridge in England. Although comparatively wealthy himself, he could not afford such an estate in Britain. Land in Northern Rhodesia was much cheaper for white settlers. At the boundary commission he had come to admire the Bemba workers and so he travelled to their country looking for a site. Arriving at Lake Shiwa Ngandu in April 1914 with his Bemba servants and porters, he selected the location to settle at. World War I interrupted his plans but increased his desire to return to Shiwa Ngandu and achieve his dream. He also harboured the ideal of establishing a patrician regime of the kind whose time was ending in Britain after the war.

== Construction of the estate ==
Construction of the mansion began in 1920 when Zambia was the British protectorate of Northern Rhodesia. The site was 640 kilometres (400 miles) from the nearest railhead, a journey of many days over rivers and swamps. At that time there were no roads to the area. As well as building the estate's access roads and bridges, Gore-Browne built roads and bridges for the local colonial authority. Almost everything had to be made on site, including the bricks used in the construction. Hundreds of labourers were employed, and with the help of oxen to haul the bricks, a substantial house was constructed within a few years. However, the building work did not stop until the late 1950s; an imposing gatehouse, a tower, colonnaded porticoes, courtyards, additional rooms all added to its size and stature. Each of the stone panels used on the roof weighs 2.5 kilograms.

The house was surrounded by nursery gardens, tennis courts, a walled ladies' garden and much more. The estate followed in the tradition of 19th century Utopian model villages like Saltaire and Port Sunlight. The estate is 12 500 hectares. The estate had its own schools, hospitals, playing fields, shops, and post office. Workers lived in brick-built cottages and the estate was ruled as a benevolent autocracy. Gore-Brown was locally nicknamed Chipembere (rhinoceros).

== The estate in Gore-Browne's later life ==
Shiwa Ngandu's remoteness and isolation from white settler society in Northern Rhodesia's southern half and in Southern Rhodesia gave Gore-Browne a perspective on black Africans which led him to believe the country should develop in a more collaborative direction than the settler-ruled and segregationist Southern Rhodesia and apartheid South Africa. He involved himself in politics to promote his ideas.

The estate never managed to make consistent and steady profits. The soil was too acidic for most crops, and after trying various other sources of revenue, they found a more stable income in the production of essential oils and citrus blossoms especially when the Second World War closed off supplies of essential oils from the rivieras of France and Bulgaria. However, his projects were heavily subsidized by Dame Ethel Locke King, with whom he was obsessively attached and corresponded from his childhood until her death. This source of revenue ended in 1958 when the citrus trees were attacked by a blight.

Gore-Browne died in Kasama, Zambia in 1967, with a eulogy given by then-President Kenneth Kaunda.

== Fame and tragedy ==
After Gore-Browne's death, Shiwa Ngandu was managed by one of his daughters, Lorna, and her husband John Harvey. They had four children, who grew up at the estate. They appeared in the British Broadcasting Corporation travelogue series Pole to Pole in 1991, when presenter Michael Palin visited the estate. Six months later in 1992, the Harveys were murdered at Shiwa Ngandu by three African National Congress (ANC) members living in exile in Zambia. The ANC disavowed any prior knowledge and condemned the murders, and although some property was stolen, possible motives remain speculative.

In the years following the murders, the house fell into disrepair.

== Present day ==
Shiwa House has been partially restored and has opened five rooms for paying guests under the name 'Shiwa Ngandu Manor House'. An airstrip has been built for charter flights. Touring the estate is free for Zambian citizens.
