= Hugh F. Locke King =

British entrepreneur (1848 – 1926)

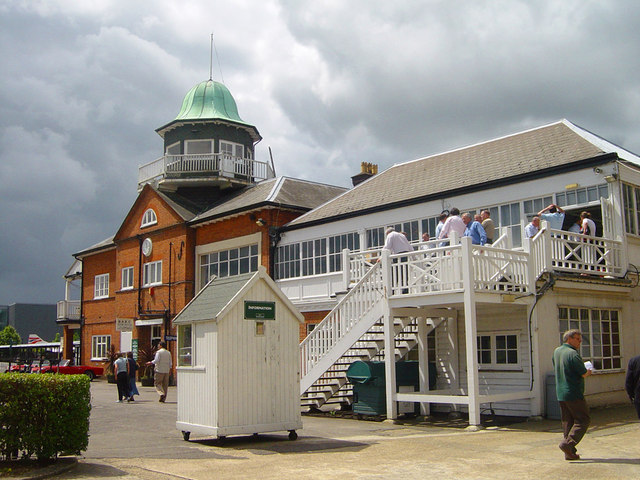
The Clubhouse at Brooklands today belongs to the Brooklands Museum

Hugh Fortescue Locke King (7 October 1848 – 28 January 1926) (sometimes incorrectly written as Locke-King), was a British entrepreneur who founded and financed the creation of the Brooklands motor racing circuit.

== Early years ==
He was born at Chertsey, the third of four sons and sixth of nine children of Louisa Elizabeth (née Hoare; ca. 1813–1884) and Peter John Locke King (1811–1885), MP for East Surrey from 1847-74 (the younger son of Lord King of Ockham).

== Motoring and aviation on the estate ==
Brooklands in Weybridge, Surrey, his inherited estate, became at his direction the site of many aeronautical and motoring milestones during the first half of the 20th century with motor races held at the circuit between 1907 and 1939, including two Grands Prix. Brooklands simply described a multi-channel stretch of the River Wey plus eastern hillsides and meadows supporting sheep and crops, the major secondary estate of the manor of Oatlands. The reduced but still hamlet-sized estate had been bought in 1830 by his father from the death estate of Prince Frederick, Duke of York and Albany for £28,000 (equivalent to £2,765,165 in 2025).

Locke King decided during a European tour that Britain had to have its own motor testing track if its fledgling car industry were to develop and prosper in competition with Europe. He soon spent over £150,000 (equivalent to £15,769,085 in 2025) of his money developing it, which was returned with a small profit by its value to industry at his death.

Locke King devised and built the world’s first banked motor racing circuit here in 1906 and it became the home of British motor racing until 1939. He was inspired to build the 2.75 mile-long track. At 100 feet wide and 30 feet high to all bends, and with a fast downhill spur to assist the engines 'Start Hill' it attracted many spectators.

Locke King was spurred on by Selwyn Edge (1868–1940), an experienced racing driver and car dealer, to complete the project with his highly publicised challenge that he would drive the course in a Napier (Lion) single-handedly at a constant 60 mph for 24 hours without a rest break. Edge was to complete his remarkable challenge on the finished track without mishap. His wife took over the supervision of the finish of the build after Locke King became too ill due to stress to continue partly due to the escalating costs to finish it. An aerodrome was constructed within the Track in 1909 and this soon attracted many pioneer aviators who collectively helped to create the British aviation industry.

== Family ==
Hugh Locke King married Ethel Gore Browne (later Dame Ethel Locke King, DBE) in late 1883 or early 1884 in Kensington, London. They had no children.
