= Khpal Kor Foundation =

- Founded: 1996
- Founder: Muhammad Ali
- Purpose: Education, Orphanage
- Location: Mingora, Pakistan
- Region served: Swat, Pakistan
- Website: http://www.khpalkor.org

The Khpal Kor Foundation is a non-governmental organization and a partner of UNICEF, which serves children affected by years of conflict in Swat, Pakistan. Established in 1996 in Mingora, Pakistan, the foundation is an orphanage that provides free lodging, boarding, and standard education to more than 200 orphans. Khpal Kor Foundation has also established the District Child Assembly Swat to provide "a unique opportunity for young people to voice their concerns about children's rights issues, and to present solutions to address these concerns." Malala Yousafzai was the chair of the assembly through 2009 and 2010. AkzoNobel and KidsRights support Khpal Kor Foundation for its educational projects as part of the International Children's Peace Prize.

== Background ==
Khpal Kor (Our Home) was established in October 1996 by Swat Scouts Open Group in Mingora, Swat District, in Pakistan's Khyber-Pakhtunkhwa province. The purpose was to accommodate orphan children who were vulnerable to child labor, child abuse, drug addiction, and other harmful activities. The orphanage started with five orphan children. This number increased over time. The Khpal Kor Foundation also extended support to the people affected by the 2005 Kashmir earthquake by providing admission to 50 orphaned students. During the 2007 and 2009 Military operations in Swat, a large number of children became orphans, and the Khpal Kor Foundation extended its services to them. The foundation is currently supporting over 200 orphan boys whose parents perished during the conflict in Swat.

== Social Activities ==
The foundation promotes various social activities. It established the Child Assembly, composed of 65 young members selected from various schools around the Swat District. Malala Yousafzai was the speaker of the Child Assembly in 2009 and 2010, receiving media attention for "confidently" chairing a session while still in 7th grade. Malala Day was also observed at Khpal Kor model school.

== Funding ==
The Khpal Kor Foundation is funded by endowments and by grants from non-governmental organizations including Qatar Charity, KidsRights, Heart Canada, and ISRA-UK, and by individual sponsors. In addition, a school, the KKF Tent Service, the KKF computer institute, a tailoring service, and the KKF auditorium have been established to generate funds.

== Khpal Kor Model School ==
Khpal Kor Model School is one of the sister projects of Khpal Kor Foundation. It provides education to more than 1,900 children. The school provides education not just to orphans but also to poor students from the nearby community for a nominal fee.

== International Recognition ==
AkzoNobel and KidsRights support four educational projects as part of the International Children's Peace Prize. Khpal Foundation is one of them. Khpal Kor Foundation is a partner of UNICEF.

== See also ==
- Edhi Foundation
