= International Children's Peace Prize =

- Awarded for: Outstanding contributions in advocating children's rights
- Location: Amsterdam, Netherlands
- Reward: €100,000 or $123,000
- First award: 2005
- Currently held by: KidsRights Foundation
- Website: childrenpeaceprize.org

The International Children's Peace Prize is awarded annually to a child who has made a significant contribution to advocating children's rights and improving the situation of vulnerable children such as orphans, child labourers and children with HIV/AIDS. It holds a reputation as one of the leading youth prizes internationally.

The prize is an initiative of Marc Dullaert, founder of the KidsRights Foundation, an international children's aid and advocacy organisation based in Amsterdam, the Netherlands.

The winner receives a 100,000 euro donation to benefit a charitable project for children, as well as a statuette, the Nkosi, named in honour of Nkosi Johnson. The statuette is of a child pushing a ball, "show[ing] how a child sets the world in motion."

== History ==
The first Children's Peace Prize was launched in November 2005 during the World Summit of Nobel Peace Laureates in Rome, an annual meeting of Nobel Peace Prize winners and international organisations such as UNICEF and Amnesty International. "We welcome the launch of Children’s Peace Prize during our summit," the summit's closing statement said.

Mikhail Gorbachev presented the 2005 prize, which was posthumously awarded to Nkosi Johnson, a South African boy who brought international attention to children with HIV/AIDS and founded the Nkosi's Haven home for HIV-positive mothers and children.

The 2006 award was handed out by Nobel Peace Prize laureate Frederik Willem de Klerk in a ceremony at the Binnenhof, the seat of the Dutch parliament in The Hague. The 2007 was presented at the Binnenhof by Bob Geldof and Nobel Peace Prize laureate Betty Williams. The 2008 prize was presented by Desmond Tutu.

In 2018 a finalist was Leilua Lino, a human rights activist from Samoa.

== Recipients ==
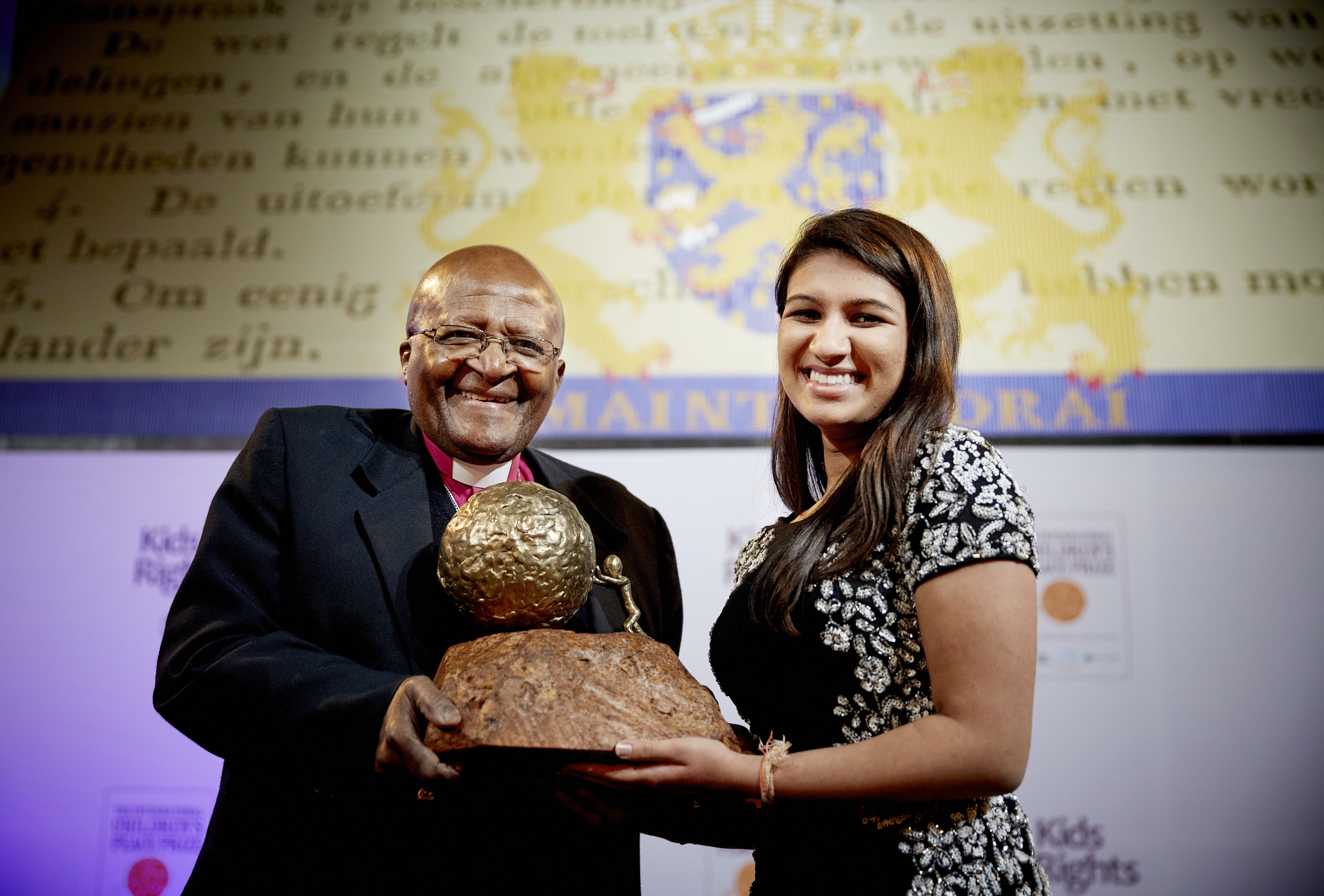
Archbishop Desmond Tutu awarding the International Children's Peace Prize to Neha Gupta in 2014

Year	Recipient	Country
2005	Nkosi Johnson	South Africa
2006	Om Prakash Gurjar	India
2007	Thandiwe Chama	Zambia
2008	Mayra Avellar Neves	Brazil
2009	Baruani Ndume	Tanzania
2010	Francia Simon	Dominican Republic
2011	Michaela Mycroft	South Africa
2012	Kesz Valdez	Philippines
2013	Malala Yousafzai	Pakistan
2014	Neha Gupta	United States
2015	Abraham Keita	Liberia
2016	Kehkashan Basu	United Arab Emirates
2017	Mohamad Al Jounde	Syria
2018	March for Our Lives	United States
2019	Greta Thunberg	Sweden
2019	Divina Maloum	Cameroon
2020	Sadat Rahman	Bangladesh
2021	Vihaan and Nav Agarwal	India
2022	Rena Kawasaki	Japan
2023	Sofia Tereshchenko, Anastasia Feskova and Anastasia Demchenko	Ukraine
2024	Nila Ibrahimi	Afghanistan
2025	Bana al-Abed	Syria
2026	Francisco Javier Vera Manzanares	Spain

== Similar awards ==
The World's Children's Prize for the Rights of the Child is awarded yearly by Swedish organisation Children's World.

An International Children's Peace Prize was also handed out by the San Francisco-based Children as the Peacemakers Foundation. The Global Peace Index of the Institute for Economics & Peace (IEP) issued a World Children Peace Prize; winners included Licypriya Kangujam.

== Sources ==
- The Children's Peace Prize
- KidsRights Foundation
- World Summit of Nobel Peace Laureates closing statement
- Telegraaf (Dutch)
- Children as the Peacemakers Foundation
