= Uganda Rural Fund =

Non-governmental organization in Uganda

Uganda Rural Fund logo

Uganda Rural Fund (URF) is a grassroots non-governmental organization working in Southwestern Uganda, primarily in the Masaka and Rakai Districts. URF states that its mission is to “to empower orphans, impoverished youth, and women to fight poverty in Uganda’s rural communities, through the creation of educational and sustainable development opportunities.” URF attempts to give community members the tools and resources to better their own lives and the lives of those around them.

== History ==
Uganda Rural Fund began in 2005, when John Mary Lugemwa, OSB, Peter Francis Luswata, and Rev. Mike Lillpopp discussed setting up an organization to help rural Ugandans, They brainstormed ways to help,. With the support of contacts across the globe, they created the organization. The organization began with two branches, one in Uganda and one in the United States. It briefly expanded to a third branch in Canada.,

URF's initial project was to build a school on land donated by the Waliggo family, in the small village of Molubere, near Kyetume village, in the Masaka District. From its groundbreaking in January 2006 to its opening on May 26, 2008, Hope Integrated Academy relied volunteers both in Uganda and throughout the world., Volunteers fundraised, worked to install wells and a water purifying system, improved the electric system, and helped in numerous other ways. URF created drafts for future extensions to the campus.

As the construction of Hope Academy continued, URF branched out to other projects regarding education, community development, and health,. Volunteers provided support for the projects., URF also sought to partner with compatible organizations, such as Engineers Without Borders, Architecture for Humanity, and Uganda Cares.,

URF attempted to find sustainable methods and on-going solutions to community needs. Following this aim, URF changed paradigms in 2011 to let the communities served, rather than people associated with URF, identify needs and to have URF play a supporting role,

== Branches ==
=== Uganda ===
URF-Uganda, which is a registered community-based organization (CBO), serves as the home base for URF and is responsible for most of the on-the-ground aspects of the organization. This branch is the most directly involved in all of URF's activities.

The Kampala Chapter is a group of "young professionals and university students" who support URF's mission, both directly and indirectly.

=== United States ===
URF-USA is a registered 501(c)(3) organization. It was incorporated in the state of Massachusetts in 2005, but has groups all over the United States. The functions of this branch are of a more supportive nature. This branch helps raise awareness, raises funding, and coordinates volunteers.

=== Canada ===
URF-Canada no longer exists., It also took a supporting role to URF-Uganda.

== Projects ==
=== Education ===
URF's initial project, Hope Integrated Academy is a secondary school and vocational school,. Students receive instruction in accordance with the guidelines set out by Uganda's Ministry of Education (see education in Uganda for more information). These classes are supplemented with extra life-skill and business-skill courses. Hope Integrated Academy was intended to serve orphans, especially those whose parents had died from the complications of AIDS, as well as youth who could not afford to attend school., Some students pay tuition fees and others’ costs are covered by sponsors.

URF provides other educational services. Hope Integrated Academy offers an after school program with both instructional and recreational activities., URF holds adult literacy classes and computer classes.,

The school houses a small library and a computing center., Although much of these resources are geared towards the students attending Hope, they are also open to the public.,

=== Community development ===
URF has several community development projects. These projects include a number of youth clubs and programs, Women's groups, and Men's groups. The organization puts on various workshops. It also provides such things as village banking services and microfinance.

URF has also assisted Nazareth Children's home, a nearby orphanage, and provided support services to child-headed families—families in which older children care for younger siblings after the parents have died.

URF sponsors a number of agricultural programs that promote sustainability. Most of them function similarly to Heifer International in that individuals and families are provided with an animal or bit of seeds and are then expected to pass on some of the offspring or resulting seeds to other community members.

During the March 2010 mudslides in Uganda, URF helped provide emergency supplies. Some of the orphans collected food door-to-door. This type of disaster care was relatively new to Ugandan culture.

With the new Community Participatory Development Model, URF encouraged local villagers to identify and prioritize needs.,

=== Health services projects ===
As possible, URF provides health services to the community. Services include health education, direct care, and transportation to a hospital, URF, in partnership with Uganda Cares, has offered "free HIV testing and counseling". URF worked to reduce the threat of Malaria. For example, part of the reason for building a new dormitory at Nazareth Children's home was that the existing building did not keep out mosquitoes, which contributed to the spread of Malaria. The organization also distributed mosquito nets.
