= Kesz =

Kesz may refer to:

- KESZ, a radio station licensed to Phoenix, Arizona, U.S.
- Kesz Valdez (born 1998), Filipino humanitarian
- Zoltán Kész (born 1974), Hungarian activist and former politician
