= Kehkashan Basu =

Canadian environmental and human rights activist

Kehkashan Basu MSM
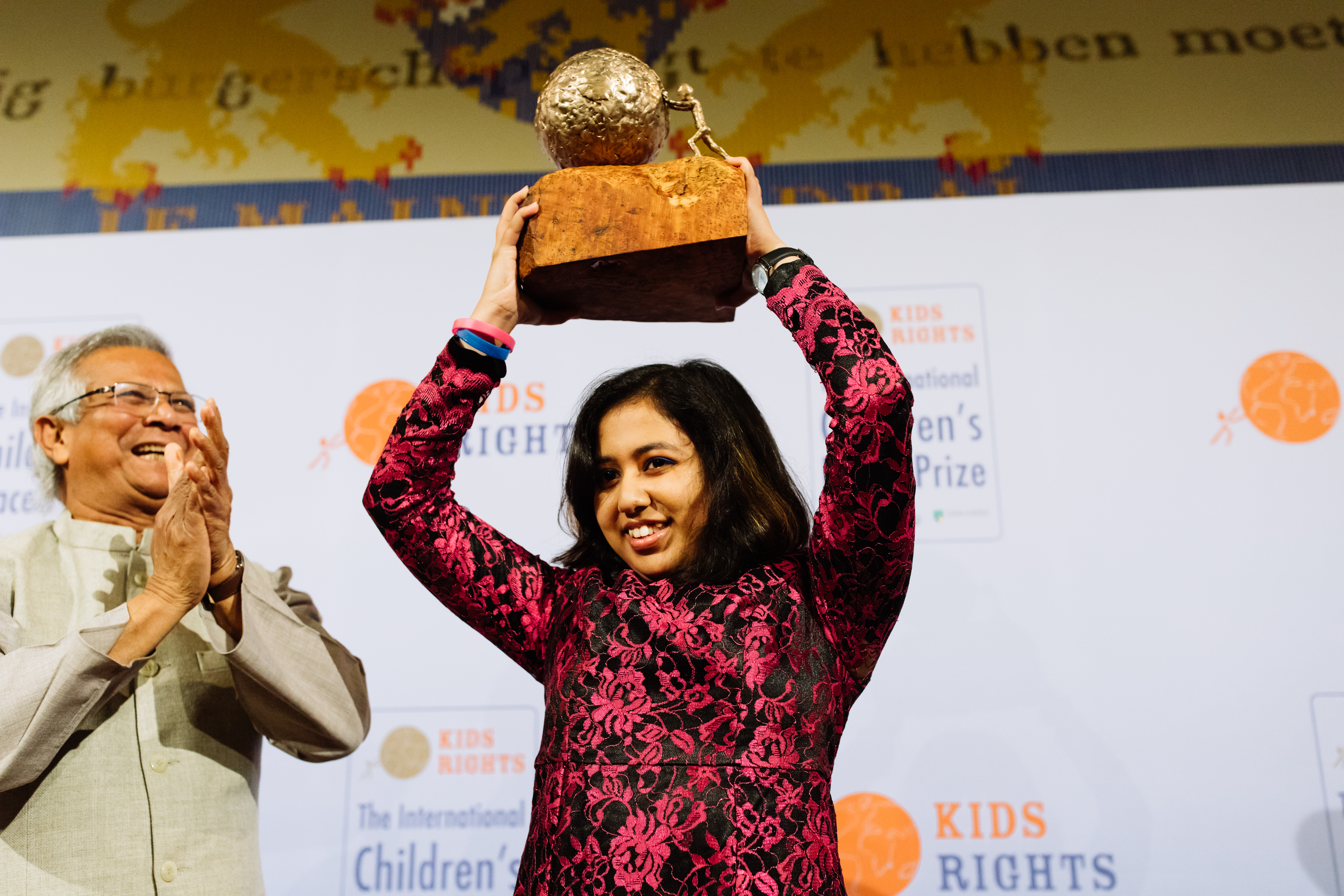
- Born: June 5, 2000 (age 26); Dubai, United Arab Emirates
- Citizenship: Canada
- Education: University of Toronto; Cornell University
- Occupations: Environmentalist, Human rights activist
- Years active: 2008–present
- Organization: Green Hope Foundation
- Awards: International Children's Peace Prize (2016)
- Website: Green Hope Foundation

Kehkashan Basu MSM (born June 5, 2000) is a Canadian environmental and human rights activist from the United Arab Emirates. Basu also advocates for peace, children’s rights, education for sustainable development, nuclear disarmament, gender equality and climate justice. She is the Founder-President of Green Hope Foundation, the youngest Councillor of World Future Council, the youngest Trustee of the Parliament of the World's Religions, a KidsRights Youngsters member, and winner of the International Children's Peace Prize 2016.

== Biography ==
Kehkashan was born on June 5, 2000 in Dubai to Indian parents from Kolkata. At age 8, she was planting trees and organizing young people to recycle. At age 11, she addressed the TUNZA Children and Youth Conference in Indonesia, and the next year she set a record as the youngest delegate to speak at a press conference at the United Nations Conference on Sustainable Development (Rio+20).

She founded the Green Hope Foundation in 2012, with the goal of teaching and implementing the UN's Sustainable Development Goals (SDGs) including through grassroots action such as tree planting. The organization also involves young people globally in the SDGs through community-focused projects in climate justice, halting land degradation, promoting sustainable consumption and renewable energy, and conserving biodiversity, as well as gender equality and social justice. Currently with more than 3000 members in total, across Canada, Suriname, United Arab Emirates, Oman, Qatar, Bahrain, United States, Indonesia, Malaysia, Cambodia, Australia, Kenya, The Bahamas, Chile, Vietnam, Seychelles, Sweden, The Netherlands, Democratic Republic of the Congo, Peru, Sri Lanka, India, Nepal, Bangladesh, Kiribati and Liberia, the organization works by conducting workshops and conferences around the implementation of the SDGs.

Basu attended the Deira International School in Dubai and graduated from the North Toronto Collegiate Institute in Toronto, Canada. In June 2022, she graduated from the University of Toronto with an Honours Bachelor of Arts with High Distinction, where she majored in environmental studies, double-minoring in women and gender studies and physical and environmental geography. Basu is currently an MBA student at the Cornell University Samuel Curtis Johnson Graduate School of Management.

In 2017, she published the short story book "The Tree of Hope", in collaboration with the illustrator Karen Webb-Meek. In the book, a young girl creates an oasis in a desert by planting trees and persuading friends to help.

In 2021, Basu was a keynote speaker at the first annual Peace Education Day Conference, held virtually.

In 2022, Basu moderated a roundtable meeting at the United Nations' Conference of the Parties (COP27) summit. The panel included international environmental policy-makers such as Susana Muhamad.

Basu spoke on Desertification and Drought Day in 2023 in an event titled "Her Land. Her Rights: Advancing Gender Equality and Land Restoration Goals at the United Nations Headquarters. The event brought together leaders and gender equality activists to discuss how to advance women's leadership and decision-making in sustainable development. Other speakers included António Guterres, Amina J. Mohammed, Csaba Kőrösi, Katrin Jakobsdóttir, Saara Kuugongelwa-Amadhila, Teresa Ribera Rodríguez, Tarja Halonen, Hindou Oumarou Ibrahim, Sonia Guajara, Jennifer Littlejohn, Sima Sami Bahous, Ibrahim Thiaw, Natalia Kanem, Alain-Richard Donwahi, Achim Steinier, Qu Dongyu, Solange Bandiaky-Badji, Rex Molapo, and Lukwesa Barak.

== Awards and recognition ==
- Basu won the International Children's Peace Prize in 2016.
- Basu was recognized as a UN Human Rights Champion in 2016.
- Basu was named as one of Canada's Top 25 Women of Influence in 2018.
- Basu was listed as a National Geographic Young Explorer in spring 2020.
- Basu received the first Voices Youth Award in 2020.
- Basu was named as a Forbes 30 Under 30 in 2021 – the youngest in the category of Education.
- Basu won the World Literacy Award for Significant Contribution to Literacy by a Youth in 2021.
- Basu was awarded the Meritorious Service Medal of Canada (Civil Division) in 2022.
