= Leilua Lino =

Samoan human rights activist

Leilua Lino is a Samoan human rights activist, who works to raise awareness of gender-based violence and violence against children in Samoa, through her own personal experience. She was a finalist in 2018 for the International Children's Peace Prize. In 2019, she was the first recipient of a Commonwealth Innovation for Sustainable Development Award (Peace).

== Biography ==
Lino comes from Asau in Savaii. At the age of nine years old, Lino was raped by her father, who she took to court seven years later, leading to his imprisonment in 2018 for twenty-nine years. In order to support her after the rape, from 2011 she attended Samoa Victim Support Group (SVSG), a non-governmental organisation that offers help and advocacy to survivors. They supported Lino to file her police report against her father. She came into contact with SVSG through her church. Lino is an ambassador for Samoa Victim Support Group (SVSG) and raises awareness about abuse through schools and community programmes. In 2017 she created the first of a number of peace gardens, in order to help young people process trauma.

In 2018, she was nominated for and became a finalist in the International Children’s Peace Prize, coordinated by the KidsRights Foundation. She was also nominated by the Samoa Observer as a 'Person of the Year' for 2018. In 2019 she was presented with a Commonwealth Innovation for Sustainable Development Award by Prince Harry. She won in the Peace category. The award recognised her contributions to supporting survivors of child sexual abuse.
