= MUN Alert =

National Emergency Alert System
- Full form: Missing Urgent Notification
- Launched by: Criminal Investigation Department (CID)
- Partner organization: Amber Alert for Bangladesh
- Technical partners: Zero Missing Children Platform, Meta, and NCMEC
- Launched: 13 January 2026
- Hotline: 13219 (toll-free)
- Website: munalert.org

MUN Alert (short for Missing Urgent Notification) is a national emergency alert system in Bangladesh established to facilitate the rapid recovery of missing and abducted children. The service was officially launched on 13 January 2026 through a joint initiative of the Criminal Investigation Department (CID) of Bangladesh Police and Amber Alert for Bangladesh. A nationwide toll-free hotline, 13219, operates 24 hours a day under the system.

The alert system was named in memory of Muntaha Akter Jarin, a five-year-old child who was abducted and murdered in Sylhet in 2024. Modeled after the American AMBER Alert system, MUN Alert aims to ensure public participation through technology during the critical first hours after a child's disappearance, often referred to as the "golden time".

== History ==
The concept of emergency alert systems for missing children gained international significance following the abduction and murder of Amber Hagerman in the United States in 1996, which led to the creation of the AMBER Alert system. Similar systems were subsequently adopted in many countries according to their legal and administrative frameworks.

In Bangladesh, the need for a rapid and technology-based alert system became evident after the disappearance of five-year-old Muntaha Akter in Kanaighat, Sylhet, in November 2024. Her body was recovered seven days later. Following the incident, efforts intensified to establish a coordinated emergency response mechanism for missing children.

Under the leadership of Sadat Rahman, founder of Amber Alert for Bangladesh and recipient of the International Children's Peace Prize, advocacy for such a system had been ongoing for several years. The system was eventually developed by the CID Missing Children Cell with technical support from the Zero Missing Children Platform.

The system was officially inaugurated on 13 January 2026 at CID Headquarters in Malibagh, Dhaka, by CID chief Additional Inspector General Md. Sibgat Ullah.

== Naming ==
The system was named "MUN Alert" in memory of Muntaha Akter Jarin, the child victim whose case inspired its creation.

The acronym "MUN" also represents the English phrase Missing Urgent Notification.

== Purpose and significance ==
According to international research and practical experience, the first three hours after a child goes missing are considered the most critical period, often referred to as the "golden time". Rapid dissemination of information during this period significantly increases the chances of locating and safely recovering the child.

The primary objective of MUN Alert is to quickly distribute information about missing and abducted children to the public and to encourage immediate participation from both law enforcement agencies and citizens in recovery efforts.

== Implementation and administration ==
MUN Alert is administered by the Missing Children Cell of the CID.

The Zero Missing Children Platform serves as its primary technical partner, while the Amber Alert for Bangladesh team provides coordination and advisory support.

International organizations such as the National Center for Missing and Exploited Children (NCMEC) and Meta Platforms contribute technical expertise to the initiative.

The banking sector, particularly the Association of Bankers, Bangladesh (ABB), also supports the system by providing access to ATM and digital display networks.

== Effectiveness and practical applications ==
Shortly after its launch, MUN Alert demonstrated its practical effectiveness. On 14 January 2026, five-year-old Jara Baroka Muskan, who had been abducted from Mirpur, Dhaka, was safely recovered from Sadarghat Launch Terminal within 23 hours following the issuance of a MUN Alert.

The system was also activated in late January 2026 to assist in the recovery of three-year-old Hisan Rahman, who had been abducted from the Mugda area of Dhaka.

== Limitations and criticism ==
Despite its technological sophistication, some structural limitations have been identified during the initial implementation phase. In particular, the lack of direct and automated coordination with local police stations has been noted. Since families often first report missing children to local police through General Diaries (GD), experts and officials have suggested stronger integration with local law enforcement agencies to improve the system's effectiveness.

== See also ==
- AMBER Alert
- Criminal Investigation Department (Bangladesh)
