= Om Prakash (disambiguation) =

Om Prakash (1919–1998) was an Indian film actor.

Om Prakash may also refer to:

- Om Prakash Chautala, former five term chief minister of Haryana, India; son of Devi Lal
- Om Prakash (child labourer) or Om Prakash Gurjar (born 1992), former child labourer who won the International Children's Peace Prize
- Om Prakash (cinematographer) (born 1978), Indian cinematographer
- Om Prakash (general) (born 1955), Indian army officer
- Om Prakash (historian) (born 1940), Indian economic historian
- Om Prakash (rower), Indian rower
- Sandir Om Prakash (1929–1994), Indian cricketer

== See also ==
- Omprakash, alternate spelling of the Indian male given name
- Om Prakash Karhana (born 1987), Indian shot putter
- Om Prakash Mitharwal (born 1995), Indian sport shooter
- Om Sahani or Om Prakash Sahani, Indian actor
