= Championing Community Children =

Philippine charitable organization

C3's logo.

Championing Community Children, also known by its members by its abbreviation, C3, is an organization founded by International Children’s Peace Prize laureate Kesz Váldez, who has started the organization in around 2006 in the desire to help children who live in the streets. The founder himself used to be a street child before rescued by Harnin Manalaysay, founder of Bible study group "Club 8586."

The organization helped more than 10,000 children in Cavite to date, handing out Gifts of Hope (parcels like slippers, toys, school supplies) along with teaching street children on hygiene, food and children's rights. He has handed out 5,000 parcels to these children. "Championing Community Children" has been holding fundraisers and distributing solicitation letters to fund these projects. C3 has been using their outreach activities to help as many street children as possible. C3 members and volunteers regularly join these outreach activities, distributing Gifts of Hope to children in dumpsites, small villages, shanties and sidewalks. Today, C3, aside from their base in Cavite, is operating branches in other places in the Philippines. One notable branch is C3 de Dagatan in Caloocan.

Recently, C3 expanded their operations to Zamboanga, and scheduled outreach activities to Layag-Layag (a community within the barangay of Talon-Talon), the Mariki Community, and the Lumbangan dumpsite area. They are now distributing solicitation letters among C3 volunteers in the area.

== See also ==
- Kesz Váldez
- Charitable organization
- Poverty in the Philippines
