= XIII International AIDS Conference, 2000 =

The XIII International AIDS Conference was held in Durban, South Africa, during the week of July 9-14 2000. 12,000 people from all over the world attended, including scientists, clinicians, health care workers, public health agencies, people living with HIV/AIDS, AIDS Non-Governmental Organizations, politicians, and the media. This conference has taken place regularly since its inception in 1985, and now takes place every two years.

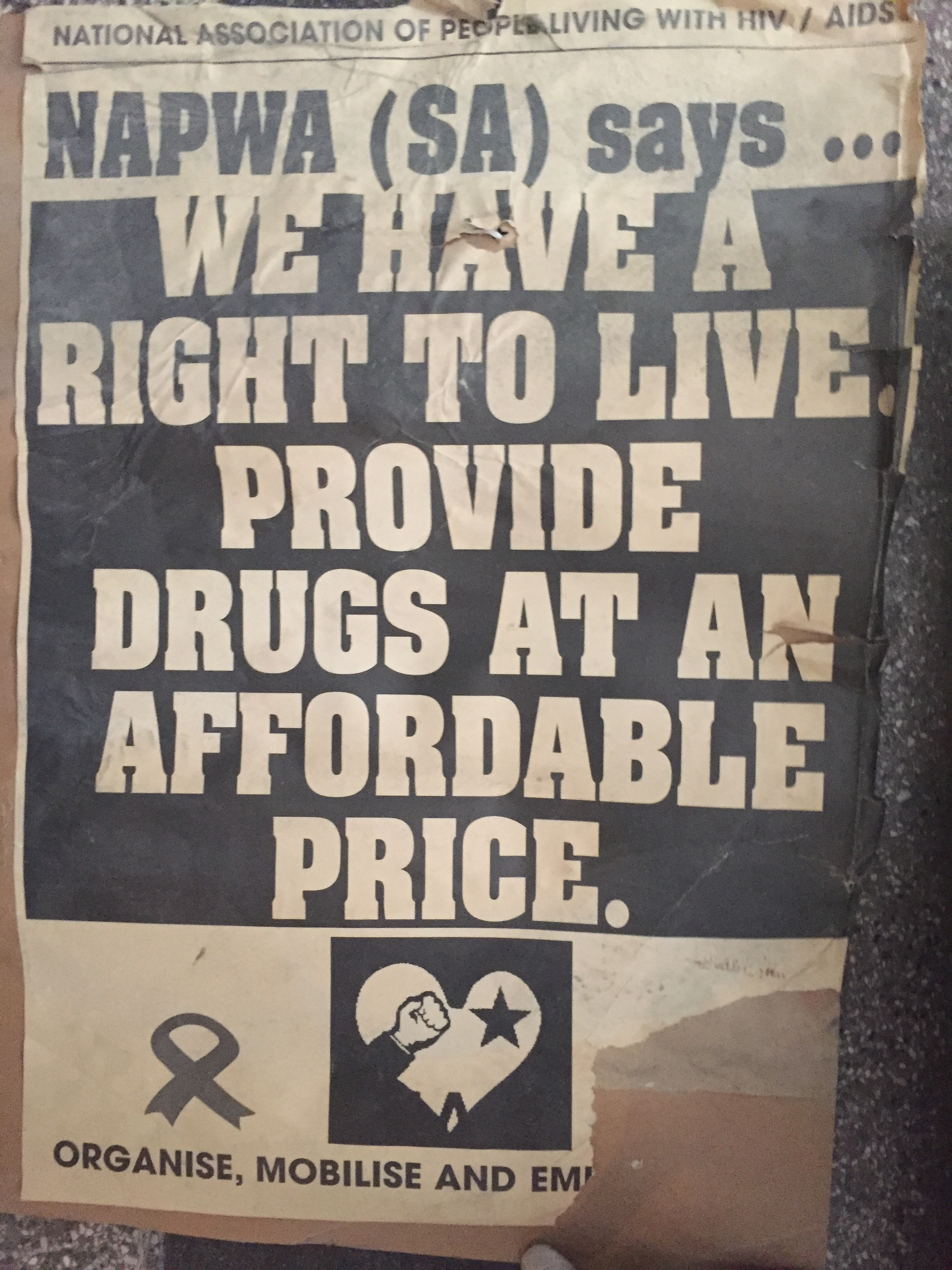
Demonstration Poster from People living with AIDS and HIV at the 2000 Aids Conference in Durban

== Theme ==
Each conference has a theme. The theme for 2000 was "Breaking the Silence", which is described as "the urgent need to break the silence on equal access to treatment and care; improved and ongoing prevention of HIV transmission; governmental and private sector support of HIV education and resources; human rights; access of appropriate and meaningful information to all sectors and ensuring a supportive environment for people living with HIV/AIDS (PWA) in society."

== Issues ==
There seems to have been a battle between the political and scientific communities happening on the fringes of the conference, driven by what appeared to be South African president Thabo Mbeki's growing HIV/AIDS denialism. In the months prior, Mbeki had routinely sought the counsel of key denialists, including Anthony Brink and Christine Maggiore, and his thirty-three member Presidential AIDS Advisory Panel, convened earlier that year, was made up of about half mainstream scientists and half dissidents.

Prior to the conference, 5,000 scientists signed the Durban Declaration, affirming that HIV causes AIDS. Published in Nature, the declaration stated, among other things, that "HIV causes AIDS. It is unfortunate that a few vocal people continue to deny the evidence. This position will cost countless lives." Each person who signed the document was required to have a Ph.D. or M.D.-equivalent degree. To avoid the appearance of conflict of interest, scientists "working for commercial companies were asked not to sign." The signatories included eleven Nobel Prize winners. Mbeki did not reference it during his opening conference remarks.

During the conference, Mbeki left the event while 11-year-old activist Nkosi Johnson was addressing the crowd, "a sign of the blindness that would later lead him to say that he did not know anyone who had died of AIDS."

The Treatment Action Campaign held a protest march during the event, the "Global March for Treatment Access," where Winnie Mandela addressed the crowd, saying, “Let me state what appears to have become less than obvious in South Africa in the last few months,” she said: “AIDS exists! HIV causes AIDS!’” The event was attended by an estimated 5,000 people.

At the conference, Professor Jeffrey D. Sachs, then chairman of the WHO Commission on Macroeconomics and Health, first called for a global fund to fight AIDS. This recommendation was picked up the following year in the establishment of the Global Fund to Fight AIDS, TB, and Malaria. This can be supported from a presentation which Professor Sachs presented during the conference (slide 10).

== Opening address ==
During his opening address, Mbeki refused to state that HIV causes AIDS, leading hundreds of delegates to walk out. He stated that "HIV-AIDS" is a disease of capitalism and imperialism, much like tuberculosis and malaria.

== Closing ceremony ==
An 83-year-old and fragile-looking Nelson Mandela gave the closing address, and part of it is reproduced here:

To have been asked to deliver the closing address at this conference, which in a very literal sense concerns itself with matters of life and death, weighs heavily upon me for the gravity of the responsibility placed on one.

No disrespect is intended towards the many other occasions where one has been privileged to speak, if I say that this is the one event where every word uttered, every gesture made, had to be measured against the effect it can and will have on the lives of millions of concrete, real human beings all over this continent and planet. This is not an academic conference. This is, as I understand it, a gathering of human beings concerned about turning around one of the greatest threats humankind has faced, and certainly the greatest after the end of the great wars of the previous century.
...
We need, and there is increasing evidence of, African resolve to fight this war. Others will not save us if we do not primarily commit ourselves. Let us, however, not underestimate the resources required to conduct this battle. Partnership with the international community is vital. A constant theme in all our messages has been that in this inter-dependent and globalised world, we have indeed again become the keepers of our brother and sister. That cannot be more graphically the case than in the common fight against HIV/AIDS.
