= Chaeli Mycroft =

South African activist

Michaela Mycroft
- Born: 30 August 1994 (age 31)
- Other names: Chaeli Mycroft
- Occupation: Disability rights activist

Michaela "Chaeli" Mycroft (born 30 August 1994) is a South African ability activist with cerebral palsy who won the International Children's Peace Prize in 2011. The medal was presented to her by Nobel Peace Laureate Mairead Maguire.

In 2004 Mycroft (aged 9), her sister Erin (11), Tarryn Terry (12), Justine Terry (9), and Chelsea Terry (6) founded The Chaeli Campaign in Cape Town to raise funds for Mycroft's motorized wheelchair. The organization now runs seven programs that impact the lives of more than 7,000 beneficiaries annually.

In 2012, at the World Summit of Nobel Peace Laureates in Chicago, she was awarded the Peace Summit Medal for Social Activism by Nobel Peace Laureate F. W. de Klerk, on behalf of all Nobel Peace Laureates. In 2013 Mycroft was awarded the World of Children Awards (Youth category) that recognizes a young person under the age of 21 who has made significant contributions in the lives of other children.

On 3 September 2015, at age 21, Mycroft became the first female quadriplegic to summit Mount Kilimanjaro in Tanzania, the highest mountain in Africa. She celebrated her birthday on the mountain.

Mycroft made history on 29 May 2016, along with Anita Engelbrecht, by being the first wheelchair athletes to complete the Comrades Marathon, an 89 kilometre ultramarathon run between Pietermaritzburg and Durban. This was the first time in the 95-year history of the event that a wheelchair athlete had successfully lobbied the organizers to have the rules changed. Wheelchair athletes were previously barred from participating.
