= Divina Maloum =

Child peace activist

- Born: Divina Stella Maloum; January 3, 2003 (age 23); Cameroon
- Occupation: Child peace activist
- Organization: Children for Peace
- Known for: Founder of Children for Peace
- Awards: International Children's Peace Prize (2019, jointly with Greta Thunberg)

Divina Stella Maloum is an activist from Cameroon. She is the founder of Children for Peace (C4P) in Cameroon. She set up the organisation when she was 11 or 12 years old. She was inspired by children who were exploited, child marriages, and child soldiers. She uses cartoons to communicate with children to avoid language barriers. She is a changemaker for peace. On November 20, 2019 - World Children's Day, when she was 14, she was joint winner of the International Children's Peace Prize together with Greta Thunberg. She was one of 137 applicants from 56 countries. The winners were announced by Desmond Tutu and the award was presented by Nobel Peace Prize recipient Kailash Satyarthi in a ceremony at The Hague. The prize was 100,000 euros to be spent on their cause.

== Awards ==
- 2019 International Children’s Peace Prize

== See also ==
- Boko Haram
- Child suicide bomber
