= Kesz Valdez =

Filipino activist (born 1998)

- Born: December 26, 1998 (age 27); Imus, Cavite, Philippines
- Awards: International Children's Peace Prize (2012)

Chris "Kesz" Valdez (born December 26, 1998) is a Filipino humanitarian and founder of Championing Community Children (C3). At age 13, Kesz Valdez was awarded the 2012 International Children's Peace Prize in The Hague, Netherlands. Rev. Desmond Tutu, the Nobel Peace laureate, presented Valdez the award on September 19. He is the first Southeast Asian to receive the International Children's Peace Prize and currently the youngest among the finalists nominated for the recognition. The $100,000 Euro prize was used to fund a variety of children’s projects and further his efforts to help Philippine children. Rising from poverty with a conviction to help bring some betterment to other slum children, Valdez at such a young age highlighted their plight in the international community. His effort being recognized at the Hague, brought great pride to the Philippine House of Representatives through the resolution.

== Biography ==
Valdez was born in Imus, Cavite, Philippines on December 26, 1998. At the age of two, people would have found Kesz Valdez picking garbage in Manila's infamous Captive dumpsite which shows just how unfortunate his life was at such a young age. Valdez was beaten by his father and neglected by his mother up till the age of four years old after they decided not to sell him. In result, he was given a bad reputation and had to provide for himself. Given Valdez's situation at home, he was forced to beg, scavenge, eat garbage for food, and bring back money to support his father's drug and alcohol addictions. He escaped from his abusive family at four years old and spent his days begging for food on the streets in Manila's poorest slum area. At night, he could be found sleeping on top of open graves or in shop doorways. For over 1 1/2 years, Valdez was a homeless child who had no permanent place to live, sleep, or receive food from. He eventually studied at an outreach group called Club 8586 when he got older. Valdez was taken into care and mentored by Manalaysay after being severely burned falling into a fire. Manalaysay was the mentor of another humanitarian working for street children CNN Hero Efren Peñaflorida.

In 2006, Valdez along with his friends, founded the Championing Community Children, Kesz's Action. This is an organization which claims to give hope and show the street children they can transform their own lives and inspire others to do so as well. Throughout Valdez's organization, he has helped over 10,000 children in his community. His Championing Community Children charity teaches hygiene and provides basic needs to the children.
