= Empower Orphans =

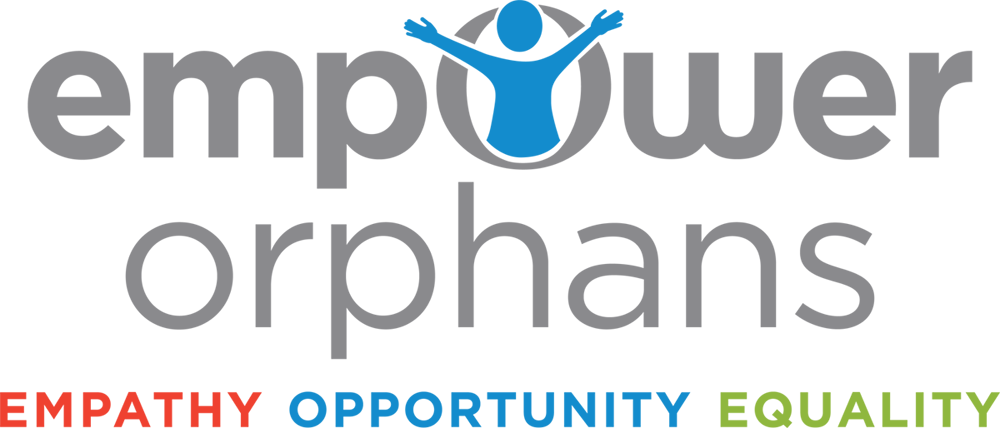
- Founded: 2009
- Founder: Neha Gupta
- Purpose: Education and Health care
- Location: Yardley, Pennsylvania, United States
- Region served: Worldwide
- Method: Aid
- Website: http://www.EmpowerOrphans.org/

Empower Orphans is a registered 501(c)(3) non-profit organization, which intends to address the problems associated with orphans and abandoned children, as well as children born into homes living in poverty. The organization's goal is to help create self-sufficiency, by supplying children with the tools to gain a basic education and technical skills to enable a sustainable livelihood. In addition to education, Empower Orphans provides food, clothing, health care, and medical supplies to establish an effective learning environment.

== History ==
The organization was started by Neha Gupta when she was 9 years old. Neha Gupta, born on May 23, 1996, has changed many people's lives by not only helping orphans in India but also by supporting organisations in her home town. She was inspired to establish Empowering Orphans through visits to her grandparents in India, where she observed poverty stricken children. In 2014, Neha Gupta became the first American ever to win the International Children's Peace Prize.

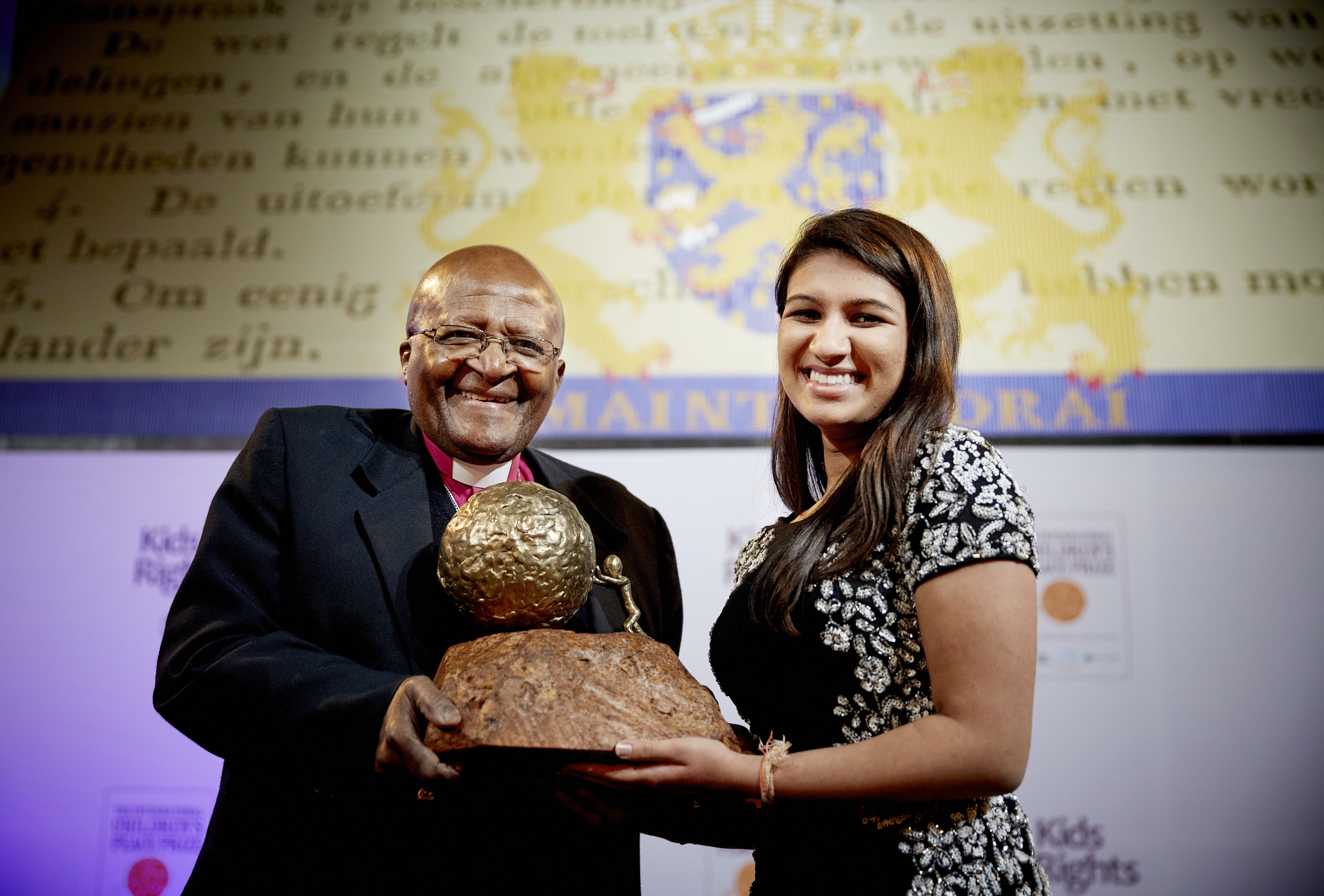
Neha Gupta receiving the International Children's Peace Prize

== Projects ==
Money raised has been invested in projects to benefit orphaned and impoverished children. Also, her current projects follow below:

=== Education ===
- Established 5 libraries, with total of 15,500 books at an orphanage and at 4 schools for underprivileged children.
- Started 4 computer labs at underprivileged schools.
- Set up a science center with microscopes at a school for underprivileged children.
- Established a sewing institution with 30 sewing machines for the older sibling of children attending an underprivileged school. The graduating class were given these sewing machines, which enabled them to immediately start their own business and earn a living and assist their families.
- Sponsored the complete education of 100 underprivileged children.

=== Healthcare ===
- Donated more than 200 van loads of home furnishings to improve the living conditions of underprivileged children in Bucks County, PA, USA.
- Provided diapers to 5000 children through The Greater Philadelphia Diaper Bank.
- Installed a water well and water purification system to benefit thousands of villagers in India.
- Conducted a 4-day Eye and Dental camp for 360 under privileged children. The doctors evaluated the needs of each child and advanced treatment was provided to the children as appropriate. 56 children were provided additional eye care and 103 children with extensive dental treatment.
- Sponsored the surgeries of polio victims
- Provided nutritious food, school books, school bags, footwear, warm clothes and blankets to thousands of orphaned children.

=== Awards ===
- Global winner of International Children's Peace Prize
- Global winner of World of Children Award (considered as the Nobel Prize for Child Advocacy)
- National winner of Prudential Spirit of Community Award
- National winner of Kohl's Kids Who Care Award
- National winner of NHL All-Star World Changer Award
- National winner of Points of Light Make A Difference Day Award
- National winner of Nestle's Very Best in Youth
- Coca-Cola Scholar Award
- National winner of Caring Award and inducted into the Caring Hall of Fame
- Gold Medal for President's Volunteer Service Award - This includes a certificate and letter from President Obama and a gold lapel pin
- Winner of Wachovia bank's Philanthropic Award ("Who Would You Thank")
- Winner of 15th Annual Please Touch Museum's Great Friends to Kids Award
