= Nkosi Johnson =

South African child HIV/AIDS activist (1989–2001)

- Born: Xolani Nkosi; 4 February 1989; Dannhauser, KwaZulu-Natal, South Africa
- Died: 1 June 2001 (aged 12); Johannesburg, South Africa
- Known for: HIV and AIDS awareness
- Honours: International Children's Peace Prize (posthumous)

Nkosi Johnson (born Xolani Nkosi; 4 February 1989 – 1 June 2001) was a South African child with HIV and AIDS activist who greatly influenced public perceptions of the pandemic and its effects before his death at the age of 12. He was ranked fifth amongst SABC3's Great South Africans. At the time of his death, he was the longest-surviving child born HIV-positive in South Africa.

== Life ==
Nkosi was born to Nonthlanthla Daphne Nkosi in a village near Dannhauser on 4 February 1989. He never knew his father. Nkosi was HIV-positive from birth, and was legally adopted by Gail Johnson, a Johannesburg Public Relations practitioner, when his own mother, debilitated by the disease, was no longer able to care for him.

The young Nkosi Johnson first came to public attention in 1997, when a primary school in the Johannesburg suburb of Melville refused to accept him as a pupil because of his HIV-positive status. The incident caused an uproar at the highest political level – South Africa's Constitution forbids discrimination on the grounds of medical status – and the school later reversed its decision.

Nkosi's birth mother died of HIV/AIDS in the same year that he started school. His own condition steadily worsened over the years, although, with the help of antiretroviral medication and treatment, he was able to lead a fairly active life at school and at home.

Nkosi was the keynote speaker at the 13th International AIDS Conference, where he encouraged people with HIV/AIDS to be open about the disease and to seek equal treatment. Nkosi finished his speech with the words:

Care for us and accept us – we are all human beings. We are normal. We have hands. We have feet. We can walk, we can talk, we have needs just like everyone else – don't be afraid of us – we are all the same!

Nelson Mandela referred to Nkosi as an "icon of the struggle for life."

Together with his adoptive mother, Nkosi founded a refuge for HIV positive mothers and their children, Nkosi's Haven, in Johannesburg. In November 2005, Gail represented Nkosi when he posthumously received the International Children's Peace Prize from the hands of Mikhail Gorbachev. Nkosi's Haven received a prize of US$100,000 from the KidsRights Foundation.

In late 2000, after returning from a trip abroad to the United States, Johnson began feeling unwell. Soon after Christmas that year he collapsed. Diagnosed with brain damage, he had several seizures and became comatose. He died on 1 June 2001. Nkosi is buried at the Westpark Cemetery in Johannesburg.

== Legacy ==
- Nkosi's life is the subject of the book We Are All the Same by Jim Wooten.
- Poet M. K. Asante dedicated his 2005 book Beautiful. And Ugly Too to Nkosi. The book also features a poem entitled "The Spirit of Nkosi Johnson."
- A song titled "Do All You Can" subtitled Nkosi's song was recorded by the spiritual musical group Devotion.
- Nkosi's words are the inspiration of the song "We Are All the Same" written by NALEDi in June 2001. This song was recorded and released on her 2003 album In The Rain.
- The head office of CAFCASS at the Department for Education and Skills (Sanctuary Buildings), London has a meeting room named after Johnson.
- Stellenbosch University has a residence named after him at their Medical Campus in Tygerberg.
- The award statuette received by the winner of the International Children's Peace Prize is named Nkosi after him.
- On 4 February 2020, Google celebrated Johnson with a doodle in his honor on what would have been his 31st birthday.
