= Nkosi's Haven =

South African non-governmental organization

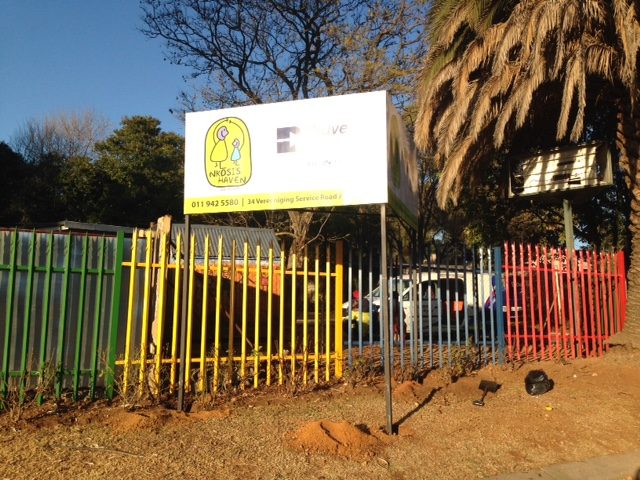
Nkosi's Haven HIV AIDS Orphanage entrance and sign

Nkosi's Haven is an NGO in the Johannesburg, South Africa area that offers residential, holistic care and support for mothers and their children whose lives have been impacted by HIV/AIDS. Nkosi's Haven also provides support for orphans, HIV/AIDS affected or not. It aims to improve the productivity of their residents through providing access to medical care, therapy, education and skill building workshops. The goal is to empower residents while providing a safe, dignified home in hopes that all mothers and children are able to become responsible and contributing members of society.

Nkosi's Haven was named after Nkosi Johnson, an AIDS activist who dedicated his life to ensuring that mothers and their children are kept together under the belief that no mother should have to leave her child due to HIV diagnosis. It is a recognized non-governmental organization that is largely funded by international donors and governmental organizations. Funding is allocated to assist accommodations, which include housing, food, water, medication, and hospice care. It also assists with education costs such as school fees, uniforms, and other expenditures. Residents share household tasks among themselves, including tasks such as cooking, cleaning, laundry, and childcare.

At the time of inception, it was the first and only care centre in South Africa that provided residential care for mothers living with HIV/AIDS and their children.

== Mission statement ==
"Through all of the work we do, we ensure that our residents learn how to live with AIDS, not die from it." Nkosi's Haven has built a home in which residents can live free from prejudice and discrimination against HIV/AIDS and children can grow into self-sufficient and responsible members of society.

== Nkosi's biography ==
Nkosi Johnson
- Born: Xolani Nkosi; 4 February 1989; Johannesburg, South Africa
- Died: 1 June 2001 (aged 12); Johannesburg, South Africa
- Other name: Nkosi Johnson
- Known for: HIV/AIDS Activism
- Notable work: Nkosi's Haven

Nkosi's Haven was named after Nkosi Johnson, a young AIDS activist who died on International Children's Day in 2001. Born Xolani Nkosi, Nkosi was infected with HIV through mother-to-child transmission. Nkosi and his mother were admitted to an AIDS care centre in Johannesburg, where they met Gail Johnson, a volunteer worker.

Due to financial restraints, the care centre that Nkosi and his mother were living in closed down. Nkosi's mother's health was deteriorating rapidly and she was unable to keep Nkosi due to her health conditions and financial dependency. She also feared that the community would find out that both herself and Nkosi were HIV positive and exile them. As a result, Gail Johnson took Nkosi into her care, changing his name to Nkosi Johnson, and became his legal foster mother.

Gail Johnson attempted to enroll Nkosi into school in Johannesburg and was faced with backlash as soon as Nkosi's HIV status was made public. In 1997, Johnson took the case to court, winning her case and forcing the South African educational system to revise their admittance policies discriminating against children with AIDS.

After Nkosi's experience with discrimination due to his health status and the forced separation between him and his mother, Nkosi's dream was to create an HIV/AIDS care centre in which children and their mothers could live freely without prejudice or discrimination because of their health status. With the help of his foster mother, Gail, Nkosi opened Nkosi's Haven in 1999, providing hundreds of mothers and their children with a safe space and communal environment.

Nkosi's journey made him the national figure in the fight against AIDS. In July 2000, Nkosi wrote and presented a speech at the 13th International Aids Conference, held in Durban, which was televised worldwide. At 11 years old, he spoke to delegates about his experience growing up with HIV. His fight with HIV birthed his dream to raise awareness and erase the stigma of HIV/AIDS through communal, supportive environments and care centres. Nkosi is most famously known for his quote, "We are normal. We have hands. We have feet. We can walk, we can talk, we have needs just like everyone else—don't be afraid of us—we are all the same!"

A year before his death, Nkosi suffered through severe brain damage and viral infections due to AIDS. He was bedridden, emaciated, suffering from seizures and unable to eat solid foods. After battling the disease for 12 years, Nkosi Johnson died in his sleep on 1 June 2001.

Nkosi was given a hero's burial memorial service in Johannesburg with thousands of attendees paying their respects to the late activist.

At the time of his death, Nkosi Johnson was South Africa's longest surviving child born with HIV/AIDS. In 2005, he was awarded with the International Children's Peace Prize for his fight against HIV/AIDS and activist efforts. After his death, Nelson Mandela released a statement, recognizing Nkosi as an "icon of the struggle for life" who fought fearlessly against HIV/AIDS. He urged everyone to give their support during this time, acknowledging Nkosi as an ambassador for South Africa and its people, especially those living with HIV.

Nkosi Johnson's legacy lives on through the work of Nkosi's Haven.

== HIV/AIDS in South Africa ==
South Africa has had high rates of HIV/AIDS diagnoses for years, with approximately 6.19 million accounted individuals living with HIV/AIDS in 2015. Within the age group of adults aged 15–49 years old, 16.6% of that cohort is HIV positive. HIV/AIDS related deaths have been declining as of recent years, with 2005 being the year with the highest number of deaths in South Africa. Thereafter, antiretroviral treatment was administered and easily accessible, changing the patterns of HIV/AIDS and extending the lifespan of many South Africans who would have otherwise died at an earlier age.

HIV/AIDS related illnesses are still high, with an increase of 4.02 million people living with HIV in South Africa from 2002 to 2015. Statistics South Africa approximates that every one out of five South African females in their reproductive ages are living with HIV.

UNAIDS reports that approximately 2.1 million children in South Africa are orphans due to HIV/AIDS related illnesses, with 180,000 deaths occurring in the year of 2015. Women over the age of 15 account for 4 million people living with HIV, and approximately 240,000 children under the age of 14 have been affected by HIV.

Evidence has shown that the HIV/AIDS crisis has had a significant impact on South African family life. Responsibility for children growing up in South African society has been increasingly separate from biological parenthood due to the lack of parental care available. Under many circumstances, children often care for their own families due to the circumstances created by the HIV/AIDS epidemic.

== Nkosi's Haven history ==
=== Berea ===
In 1999, Nkosi and Gail opened their first Nkosi's Haven location in Berea, Johannesburg. Despite being close to the city centre, selling properties became increasingly difficult in Berea, with the neighbouring area of Hillbrow beside, as it became an area that was frequented with street children and the unemployed. The 1980s was an era of high crime rates in downtown Johannesburg, which neighboured Hillbrow and Berea. After the apartheid ended in the 1990s, many gangs, along with residents from neighbouring townships, moved into the area making it unsafe. Thus, the property was offered to Gail Johnson, rent free for 5 years.

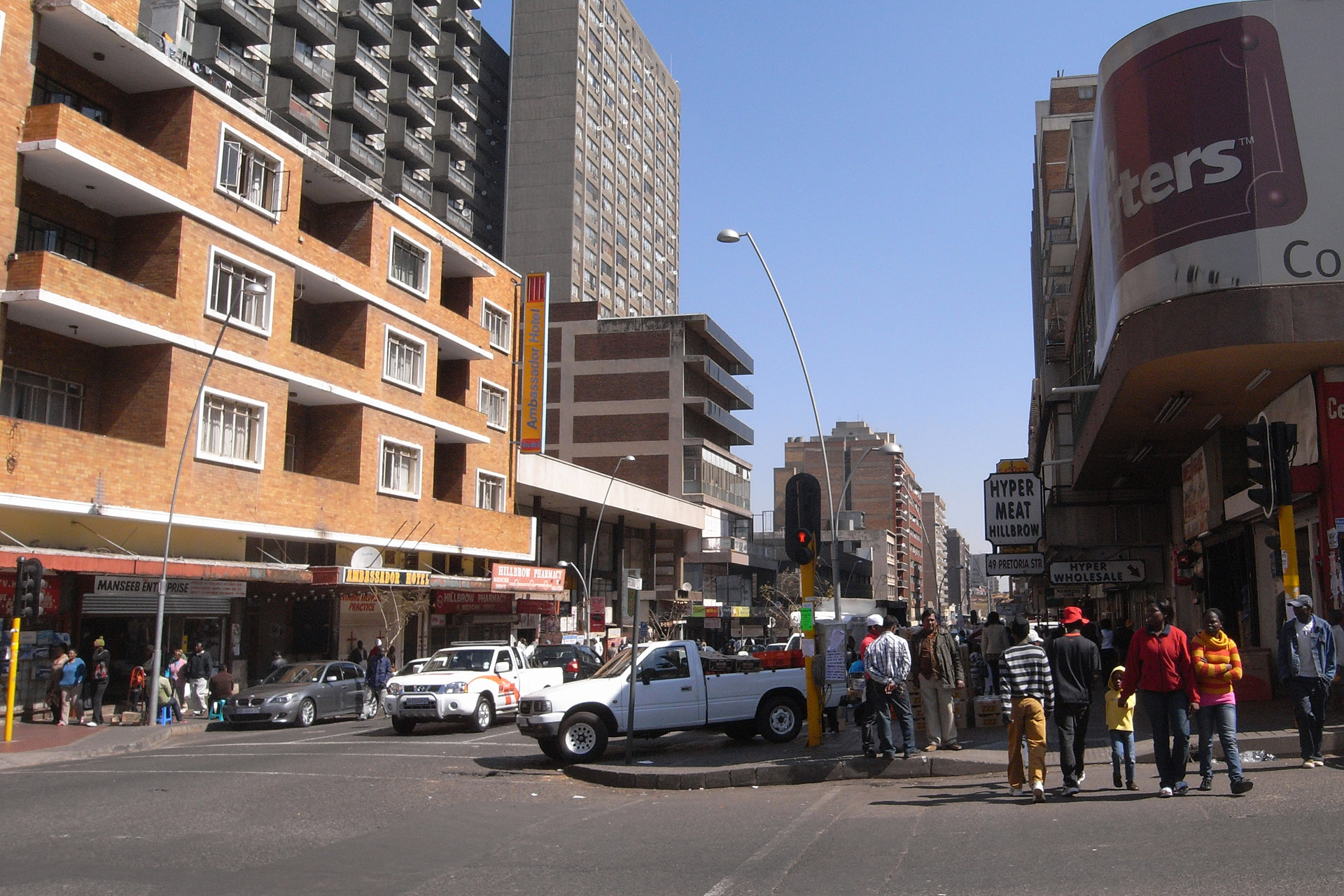
The intersection of Pretoria Street and Banket Street in Hillbrow, Johannesburg

The house was located on 23 Mitchell street and consisted of four bedrooms, one bathroom upstairs and one downstairs, a lounge, a room used as a dormitory, and a courtyard. Renovations and repairs were needed, in addition to furniture and basic house necessities. To raise funds for the completion of the house, Gail, a former public relations consultant, held a "kitchen tea" in which a wish list was created and publicized in the media and to those who were potential contributors. At the tea, Gail explained the reasons behind the creation of Nkosi's Haven. She explained that Nkosi's Haven was to offer a kibbutz style of living in which residents would take turns at cooking, cleaning, caring for the children, and helping care for each other as needed. Gail also told the guests that they already reached capacity for residence at the house. At the time, the house fit nine mothers and their children with presumed costs starting at R28,000 monthly. The results of the kitchen tea were successful and Gail managed to fundraise R45,000 worth of furniture and equipment, free electrical services, along with appliances valued at R30,000 for the nursery and dormitory.

After three years in operation, Nkosi's Haven saw need for a second home as the Berea residence was rapidly expanding with mothers and children living with HIV/AIDS and orphans. In 2002, a separate plot of land was purchased south of Johannesburg. Upon development, both residences catered to over 160 residents and their children providing meals, medication, education, daily necessities for residents living with or without HIV/AIDS, and care for orphans.

Due to financial restraints, in 2012, the NGO sold its property in Berea and moved all occupants to Nkosi's Haven Village in Alan Manor, South of Johannesburg. Costs for operating the Berea house were as much as R150,000 to R180,000 monthly, and because all occupants could be accommodated at the village, consolidating all residents meant that no one was left without a home or unemployed. Given that Nkosi's Haven village had bigger plans in motion, the shift would focus on different things such as training opportunities for residents at the newly purchased farm and other facilities at the Nkosi's Haven Village. These opportunities were unavailable in Berea due to space and financial constraints. Gail reasoned this by stating, "We are not the Titanic. We are consolidating... it makes sense to consolidate and save money."

=== Alan Manor ===
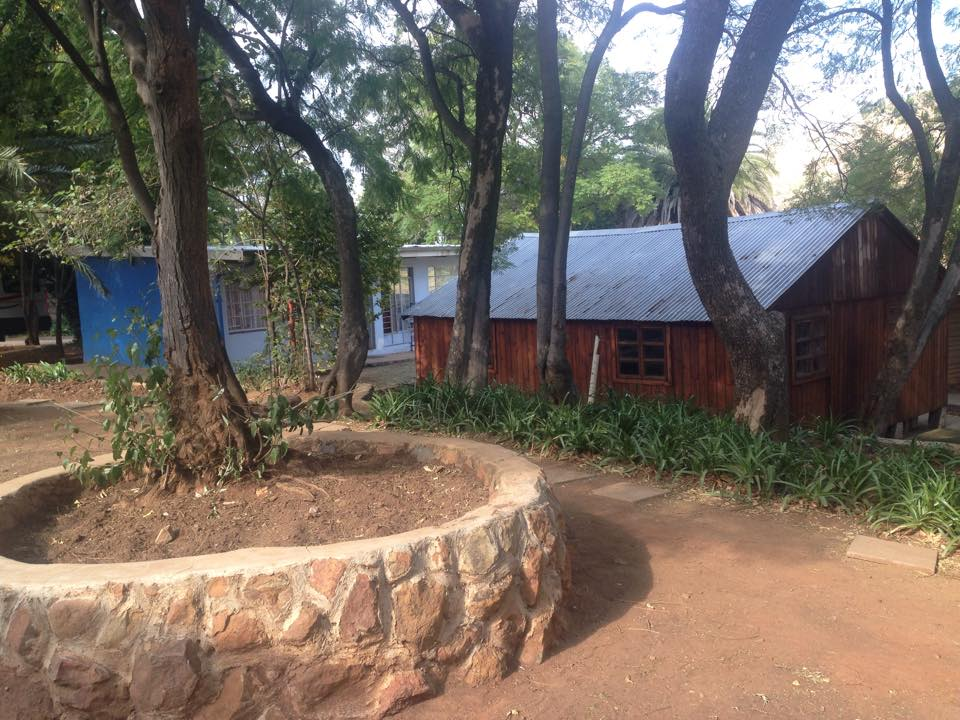
Inside Nkosi's Haven Village. Pictured in the background is one of 17 cottages used to house resident mothers, their children, and orphans.

Nkosi's Haven grew so rapidly that in 2002, a second 2.5-acre plot of land was purchased in the Alan Manor neighbourhood, south of Johannesburg to begin the development of Nkosi's Haven Village. This was made possible through a grant from the Gauteng Department of Housing, Social Housing and Special Needs. Although the project received backlash from neighbouring communities, key sponsors made the initiative possible and enabled Nkosi's Haven to host up to 180 residents at a time.

Nkosi's Haven Village in Alan Manor consists of 17 cottages in which residents reside, a sickbay, a library, a baby day care, a therapy block, a kitchen, a bakery, and a leisure block. There are also workshops and classrooms such as a computer room and an arts room for additional education and skill building. Administrative offices are located near the sickbay. All residents share household tasks and duties that help with the functioning of the village, providing a sense of leadership and empowerment to residents through skill-building activities.

==== Bakery ====
In 2010, Nkosi's Haven received a bakery donation from the South African Whole Grain Bread Project (SAGWBP). In addition to the onsite bakery container donation, SAGWBP donated enough bread mix for six months. White and brown loaves are still produced for resident consumption and are marketed to other organizations in the community at a competitive price. The residents of Nkosi's Haven Village handle oversight of operations in the bakery. While providing skill-building opportunities, those who assist can also earn a stipend for their labour.

==== Kitchen ====
In 2009, Nkosi's Haven opened their new, industrial sized kitchen through generous donations from sponsors. Employed resident mothers cook to feed the large number of residents, serving hundreds of meals daily. Three well-balanced meals are provided to every resident mother, all children and volunteers.

==== Leisure Block ====
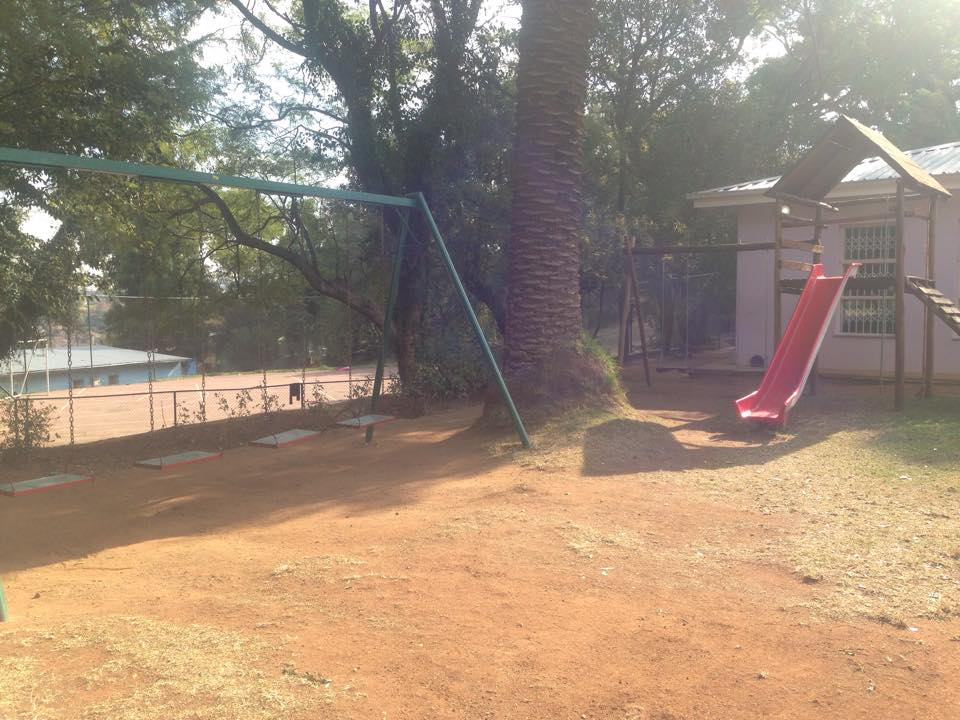
A playground onsite at Nkosi's Haven Village in the Leisure Block

A leisure room was built at Nkosi's Haven Village to further meet the requirements to become a Child Care Centre in South Africa. Dance lessons take place in the large space on a weekly basis. The room is painted with bright colours, equipped with colourful furniture, bean bag chairs, a television, and foosball tables.

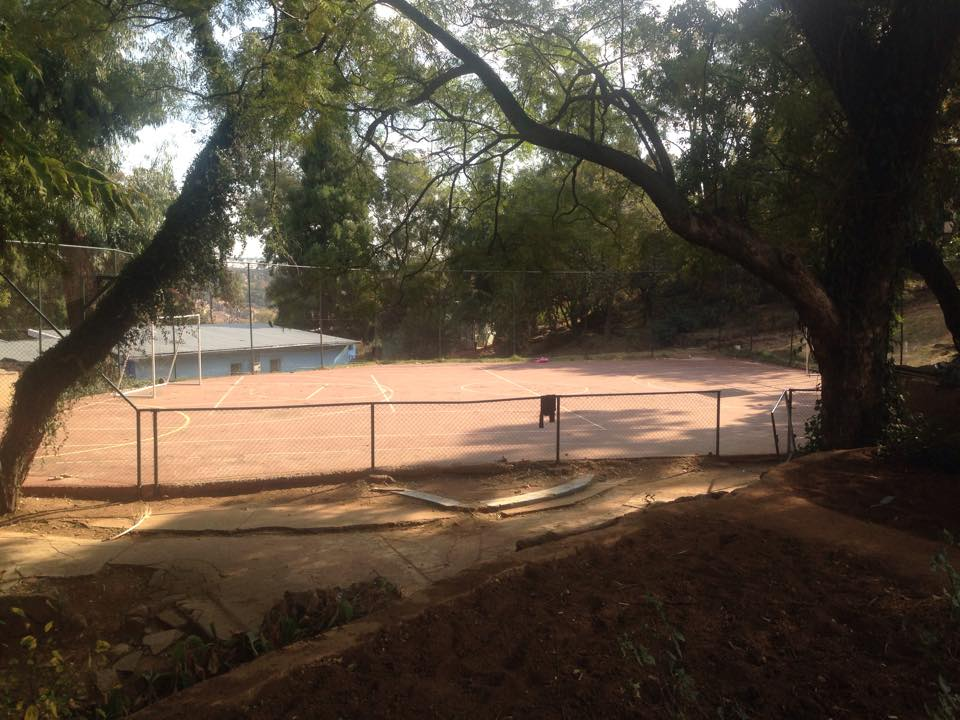
One of the areas of Nkosi's Haven Leisure Complex in Johannesburg where residents play sports and host games

==== Library ====
Nkosi's Haven Library provides a space for resident children to do their homework, leisurely reading, art sessions and workshops. Workshops include HIV/AIDS awareness sessions and life skills for women. Through funding, the Haven continues to expand its book collection in hopes to educate and provide relevant resources for residents.

A recent project development was the implementation of bibliotherapy at the library in 2010. The bibliotherapy program used books to assist the children and young teens with coping with social, emotional and physical issues. The program identified the children's needs and used a variety of programs to help eradicate the isolation of people living with HIV/AIDS through education, self-awareness, skill development, and recreation. Some sessions included storytelling, reading aloud, and "The Wall of Happiness Sessions" in which participants openly discussed what made them happy with the facilitator. The program was made available to all residents at Nkosi's Haven, including orphans and those who were free of HIV/AIDS in order to increase overall awareness. Results of the program showed success among residents, with 92% of young participants demonstrating increased knowledge and understanding about HIV/AIDS related issues, 78% demonstrating an increase in comfort and decrease in fear around HIV/AIDS related issues, and 91% of adults demonstrating an improvement in self-esteem and optimistic attitudes.

==== Music and Arts ====
A music and arts centre has been built onsite for resident use. This centre includes a keyboard and drums and is also a space that is used by the choir. Due to limited space and resources, Nkosi's Haven relies on the help of volunteers to teach music and arts lessons onsite. Programs are run year-round for mothers and their children.

An ongoing workshop is artsINSIDEOUT's annual two-week art camp that runs at Nkosi's Haven. With the help of ASTEP (Artists Striving to End Poverty), a unique art program featuring successful and competitive professionals from all areas of art including students and graduates from Juilliard, ASTEP volunteer artists use storytelling, singing, acting, dancing and visual arts to inspire the youth at Nkosi's Haven to build community, consciousness and self-awareness. ArtsINSIDEOUT organizes trips to Nkosi's Haven and has provided funding for year-round programming, including workshops and cultural programs. Local artists are invited to join the diverse artsINSIDEOUT team to enhance cultural programs available to Nkosi's Haven.

==== Sickbay ====
In 2006, Nkosi's Haven Village completed the Sickbay, consisting of a nine-bed unit, qualified nursing staff, and family physicians to help care for HIV positive residents. Many residents are sick due to AIDS-related illnesses and are being administered quality treatment and ARV's as needed.

==== Therapy Block ====
All children at Nkosi's Haven Village receive various forms of therapy, including remedial, play, occupational and speech. The therapy block was completed in December 2009 and employs two full-time therapists onsite to assist residents living with HIV/AIDS. Therapists also assist with helping resident mothers disclose their HIV status to their children.

==== Workshops and classrooms ====
Nkosi's Haven Village has one classroom and two workshops that act as a site for homework and afterschool programs. These areas offer skill-building workshops on a regular basis for residents to learn various skills such as knitting, pottery, resume writing, and more.

With the help of BT South Africa, an ICT infrastructure company, Nkosi's Haven opened a communications centre in 2010. The room comes equipped with computer monitors valued at R100,000 which allows the youth at Nkosi's Haven to videoconference and chat with their mentors and friends worldwide. Infinite Family, an American organization that enables children living with HIV/AIDS to connect with mentors worldwide, has provided more than 50 youth at Nkosi's Haven with mentors.

This room is also used to assist resident youth with their homework.

==== Nkosi's Haven 4life Farm ====
Nkosi's Haven 4Life Farm, located 50 km south of Johannesburg, has been in operation since 2008. The farm is 12 acres and currently provides crops for meals at Nkosi's Haven Village. Foundation 4Life has helped support Nkosi's Haven for years and made contributions that helped begin the production of the farm.

Within five years of full operation, Nkosi's Haven 4LIFE farm aims to develop a more self-sustaining model in which mothers living with HIV/AIDS and their children from a neighbouring township and surrounding areas would participate in growing organic food. The produce is intended for consumption by the farm community and residents of Nkosi's Haven, as well as for sale to local markets and supermarkets. The project also envisages supplying supermarket chains in South Africa once the farm reaches its intended level of production and the crops meet relevant quality standards. Additional cottages are planned to provide accommodation for more mothers and children requiring assistance from Nkosi's Haven.

== Future projects ==
=== Preschool ===
Nkosi's Haven has begun construction on the premises to begin early interventions of child development, skill transfer and various forms of therapy. Given that children in South Africa are held back from attending school if they are undergoing forms of therapy, an onsite preschool bypasses those restrictions and enables youth to develop their skills while receiving therapy. Nkosi's Haven pays R1000 monthly for each toddler to attend preschool outside of Nkosi's Haven, thus, an onsite preschool will save financial resources and assist Nkosi's Haven in becoming self-sufficient and sustainable. Nkosi's Haven plans to hire certified teachers in addition to training resident mothers to assist at the preschool, also building their skills and capacity.

== Controversies ==
Nkosi’s Haven is getting accused to collect illegal rent from their working citizens because she's not collecting enough donations to keep the NGO running. The citizens were threatened that if they go to the police, they get kicked out of the haven. The Sheriff of Johannesburg South Police is in the board of the Nkosis Haven. The owner, Gail Johnson, was invited in February 2023 to court for further investigations.

Gail Johnson involved her daughter in that NGO. She is a drug user and additionally gave Gail’s granddaughter, Leia Morgan Johnson, drugs with the age of 14 and still abusing drugs.

Thabo Johnson, adopted by Gail Johnson, was asking for donations for the NGO and used the money on his own behalf.
