= Sadat Rahman =

Bangladeshi social entrepreneur (born 2003)

- সাদাত রহমান
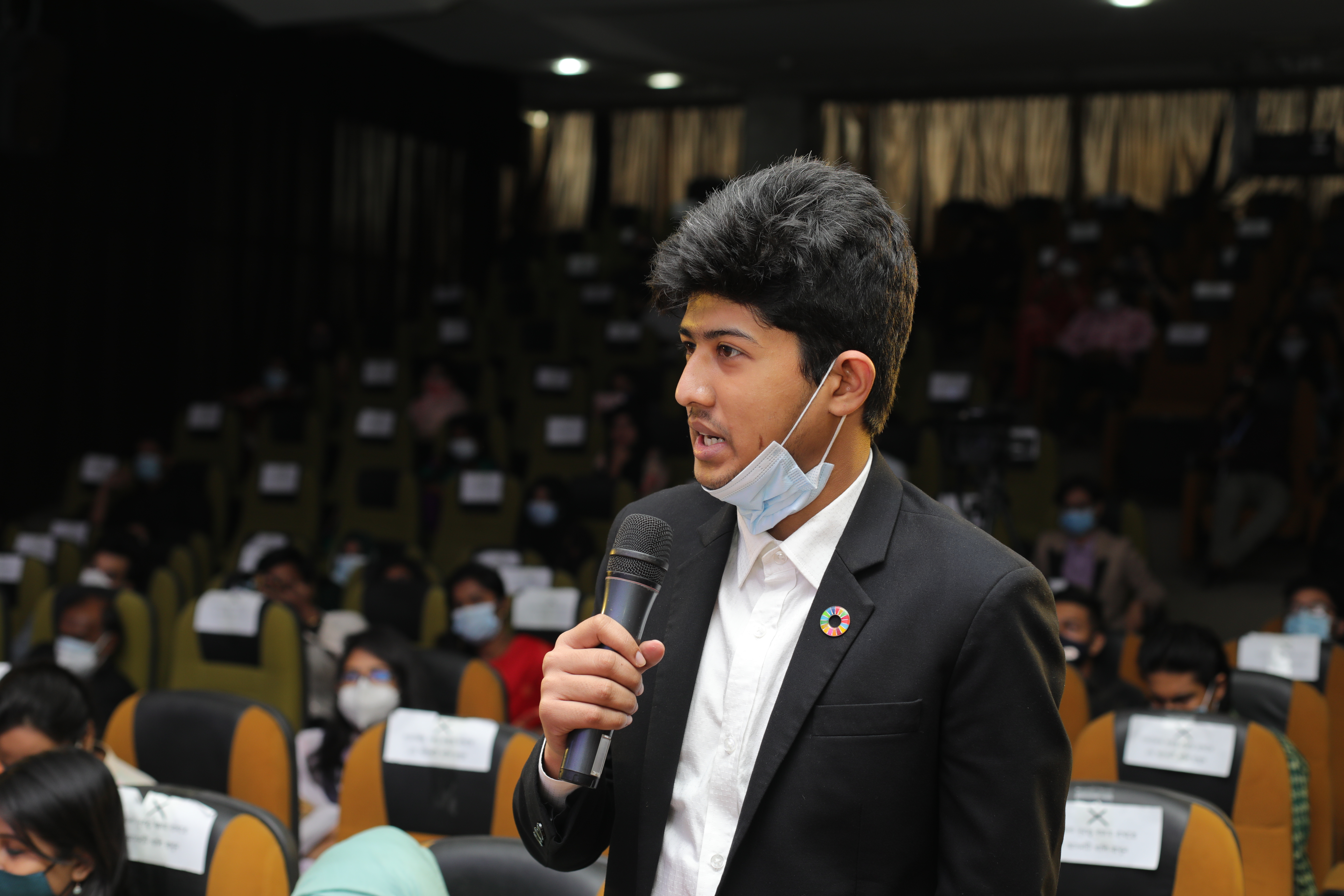
- Born: 15 May 2003 (age 23); Magura, Bangladesh
- Education: Narail Abdul Hai City College
- Awards: 2020 International Children's Peace Prize

Sadat Rahman (Bengali: সাদাত রহমান; born 15 May 2003) is a Bangladeshi social entrepreneur. He won the International Children's Peace Prize in 2020 for creating an anti-cyberbullying mobile app named Cyber Teens. He is the goodwill ambassador of Casio.

== Career ==
Sadat Rahman works to educate teenagers in Bangladesh about cyberbullying. Teenagers can report all types of cyberbullying through his app Cyber Teens. Since its inception in 2019, his app has led to the arrest of eight cybercriminals and helped many teenagers.

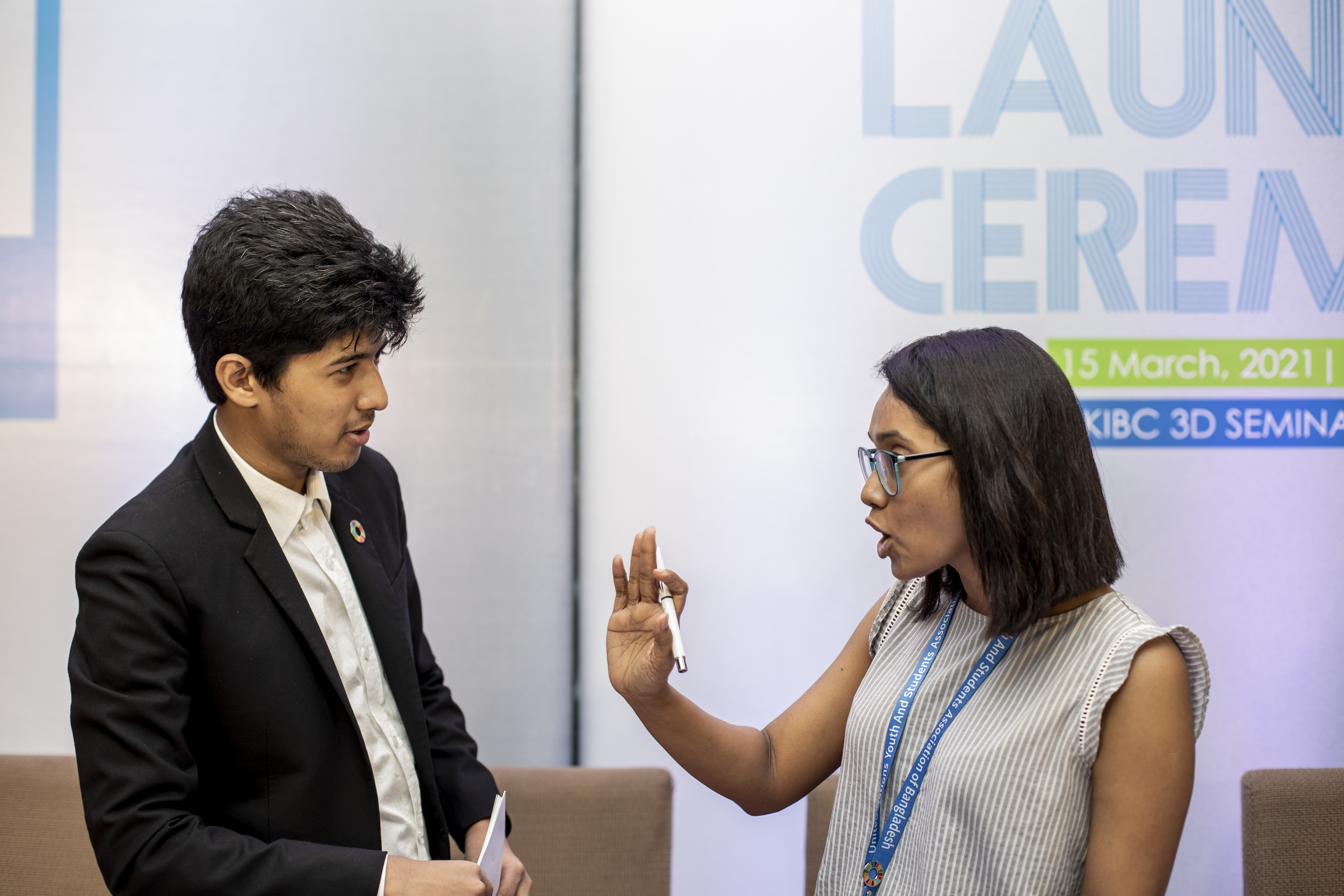
Sadat Rahman & Shammy Wadud (President, UNYSAB) at the inauguration ceremony of Y Magazine at KIB

Rahman became the goodwill ambassador of Casio in February 2022.
