= Om Prakash Gurjar =

Om Prakash Gurjar is an Indian children's rights activist and recipient of the 2006 International Children's Peace Prize. He was born in Rajasthan, India and was a victim of illegal child labor. He is known for his fight to keep public schools in India free and advocating for birth certificate registration for children to protect their rights. In addition, he and two friends founded the organization, Paatshala, which facilitates evening classes in reading, writing, and math for children.
