= Nila Ibrahimi =

Afghan youth activist

Nila Ibrahimi (Note: Dari pronunciation: [niːlɑ́ː ʔɪbɾɑːɦíːmíː], Hazaragi pronunciation: [niːlɔ́ː ʔibɾɔːjímíː].) (Dari: نیلا ابراهیمی, Hazaragi pronunciation: [niːlɔ́ː ʔibɾɔːjímíː]; born 2007) is teen activist from Afghanistan.

In March 2021, after Afghanistan’s Ministry of Education banned girls over the age of 12 from singing publicly, the Afghanistan National Institute of Music launched the #IAmMySong campaign in protest of the decision. The campaign invited musicians and supporters to record and share songs online in solidarity with Afghan girls and women. Ibrahimi participated by publishing a video of herself singing, which gained viral attention.

After the Taliban retook control of the country on August 15, she and her family fled to Pakistan and then to Canada, where she graduated from West Point Grey Academy.
