= KidsRights Foundation =

International children's aid and advocacy organization based in Amsterdam

- Formation: 2003; 23 years ago
- Headquarters: Amsterdam, the Netherlands
- Website: https://kidsrights.org/

The KidsRights Foundation is an international children's aid and advocacy organisation based in Amsterdam, the Netherlands. The foundation was founded in 2003, by Marc Dullaert and Inge Ikink. KidsRights raises funds for independent local aid projects in a number of countries around the world, including India, South Africa and the Philippines.

"KidsRights seeks to give a voice to the utterly voiceless," the organisation quotes Nobel Peace Prize laureate Desmond Tutu as saying.

The organisation's mission is to support and empower vulnerable children around the world, by raising funds for small-scale local projects, and by raising awareness for children's rights through the international media.

The foundation has instituted an annual award, the International Children's Peace Prize, to honour a child who has made a significant contribution to advocating children's rights and improving the situation of vulnerable children. The first Children's Peace Prize was presented in 2005 by Mikhail Gorbachev during the Nobel for Peace Summit in Rome, an annual meeting of Nobel Peace Prize winners. The $10,000 prize was posthumously awarded to Nkosi Johnson, a South African boy who brought attention to children with HIV/AIDS and set up the Nkosi's Haven orphanage.

Charitable events to raise funds for KidsRights have been nationally televised in the Netherlands and have featured performances from well-known artists like Andrea Bocelli, Ronan Keating, Ilse de Lange and the Sugababes. Corporate sponsors include ABN-AMRO, Akzonobel and Wilde Ganzen.

KidsRights Foundation is not related to KIDSRIGHTS, an Indianapolis-based publisher and distributor of materials on child abuse prevention and treatment.

== Sources ==
- KidsRights Foundation
- Children's Peace Price
- AllegoedeDoelen.nl (Dutch)
- zQCentral.com (Dutch)
